= 2023 French pension reform strikes =

2023 civil unrest in France

2023 French pension reform unrest Manifestations contre la réforme des retraites en France
- Part of the protests against Emmanuel Macron
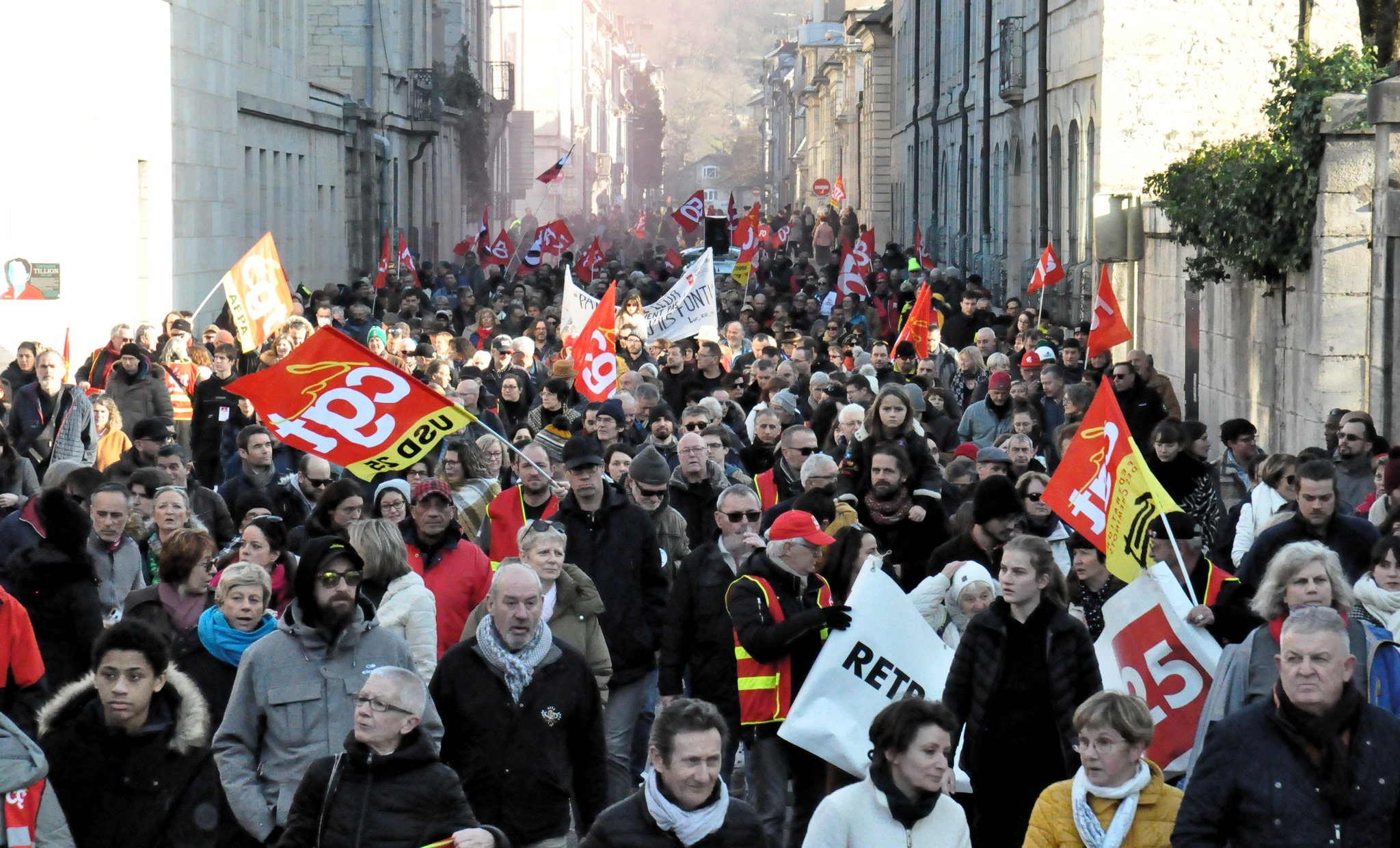
- A demonstration in Besançon on 11 February
- Date: 19 January – 8 June 2023 (4 months, 2 weeks and 4 days)
- Location: France
- Caused by: Pension reform of the Borne government
- Goals: Cancellation of the pension reform of the Borne government
- Methods: Labor strikes; Picketing; Demonstrations; Civil resistance; Civil disobedience; Direct action; Internet activism; Civil disorder; Street blockades; Barricades; Riots; Vandalism; Arson; Looting
- Status: Failed

Parties
(France) Anti-government protesters Trade unions: General Confederation of Labour; French Democratic Confederation of Labour; Workers' Force; French Confederation of Management – General Confederation of Executives; French Confederation of Christian Workers; National Union of Autonomous Trade Unions; Union syndicale Solidaires; Fédération Syndicale Unitaire; Confédération nationale du travail; Anarchists: Anarchist Federation; Union communiste libertaire; Supported by: NUPES; La France Insoumise; Europe Ecology – The Greens; Socialist Party; French Communist Party; Radical Party of the Left; New Anticapitalist Party; Lutte Ouvrière	French Republic; Government of France; Borne government; Law enforcement; National Police; Compagnies Républicaines de Sécurité; National Gendarmerie; Mobile Gendarmerie; Rural Guard; Military; French Army; National Guard; Supported by: Ensemble Citoyens; Renaissance; Democratic Movement; Horizons; Radical Party; The Republicans; Reconquête; Opposition to both reform and strikes: National Rally; LR dissidents

Lead figures
Decentralized leadership (various social leaders); Trade union leaders: Philippe Martinez; Sophie Binet; Frédéric Souillot; Laurent Berger; Laurent Escure; François Hommeril	Emmanuel Macron; Élisabeth Borne; Gérald Darmanin; Sébastien Lecornu

Number
1–3.5 million (according to trade unions, depending on the days of demonstrations) 368k–1.28M (according to interior ministry, depending on the days of demonstrations)	

Casualties and losses
~ 450 injured	~ 117 injured

A series of protests began in France on 19 January 2023 with a demonstration of over one million people nationwide, organised by opponents of the pension reform bill proposed by the Borne government to increase the retirement age from 62 to 64.

The strikes led to widespread disruption, including garbage piling up in the streets and public transport cancellations. In March, the government used Article 49.3 of the Constitution to force the bill through the French Parliament, sparking more protests and two failed no confidence votes, contributing to an increase in violence in protests alongside the union-organised strike action.

Several organizations, including human rights groups such as Reporters Without Borders and France's Human Rights League condemned France's crackdown on protests and also denounced the assault on journalists. In addition, the Council of Europe also criticised the "excessive use of force by agents of the state".

== Background ==
The issue of pension reforms has been dealt with by various French governments over recent decades, specifically to tackle budget shortfalls. France has one of the lowest retirement ages for an industrialised country, and spends more than most countries on pensions, with it amounting to almost 14% of economic output. France's pension system is largely built on a "pay-as-you-go structure"; both workers and employers "are assessed mandatory payroll taxes that are used to fund retiree pensions". This system, "which has enabled generations to retire with a guaranteed, state-backed pension, will not change". Compared to other European countries, France possesses "one of the lowest rates of pensioners at risk of poverty", with a net pension replacement rate ("a measure of how effectively retirement income replaces prior earnings") of 74%, higher than OECD and EU averages.

The New York Times says the government argues rising life expectancies "have left the system in an increasingly precarious state"; "[i]n 2000, there were 2.1 workers paying into the system for every one retiree; in 2020 that ratio had fallen to 1.7, and in 2070 it is expected to drop to 1.2, according to official projections". In addition, the cost of pensions has partially contributed to France's national debt rising to 112% of GDP, compared to 98% before the COVID-19 pandemic; this is one of the highest levels in the EU, higher than the UK and Germany. In an interview in March 2023, Macron said that "when he began working there were 10 million French pensioners and now there were 17 million". The New York Times add that in order "[t]o keep the system financially viable without funneling more taxpayer money into it – something the government already does – Macron sought to gradually raise the legal age when workers can start collecting a pension by three months every year until it reaches 64 in 2030." Additionally, Macron has "accelerated a previous change that increased the number of years that workers must pay into the system to get a full pension and abolished special pension ‌rules that benefited workers in sectors like energy and transportation".

As part of Macron's pension reforms, the retirement age was to be raised to 64 or 65, from 62. The pay-as-you-go system – raising the retirement age would help to further finance, as life expectancy increases and more start work later – would have a surplus of €3.2bn in 2022, but the government's pensions advisory board (COR) forecast that it would "fall into structural deficits in coming decades unless new financing sources are found". In March 2023, Labor Minister Olivier Dussopt said that "without immediate action" the pensions deficit would exceed $13bn annually by 2027. The government stated that the reforms would "balance the deficit" in 2030, with a surplus amounting to billions of dollars that would "pay for measures allowing those in physically demanding jobs to retire early".

The pension reforms have long been under consideration by Macron and his government. Reforming the pension system was a significant part of his platform for election in 2017, with initial protests and transport strikes in late 2019, prior to the COVID-19 pandemic which saw Macron delay the reforms further. Raising the retirement age was not part of these initial reforms, but another "plan to unify the complex French pension system" by "getting rid of the 42 special regimes for sectors ranging from rail and energy workers to lawyers was crucial to keep the system financially viable".

On 26 October 2022, Macron announced that pension reform scheduled for 2023 intended to raise the retirement age to 65, be gradually increased from 62 to 65 by 2031, by three months per year from September 2023 to September 2030. Furthermore, the number of years that contributions would need to be made to qualify for the full state pension would increase from 42 to 43 in 2027, meaning that some may have to work to 67 – the year at which a person is automatically able to receive a state pension from.

In his New Year's Eve speech on 31 December 2022, he clarified that the reforms would be implemented by autumn 2023. In early January 2023 prior to consultation with unions, Prime Minister Élisabeth Borne spoke on FranceInfo radio, stating that the government could "show flexibility" on the intention to raise the retirement age to 65, and were willing to explore "other solutions" that would enable the government to "reach its target of balancing the pensions system by 2030". She announced that the policy would be presented to cabinet on 23 January and debated in parliament in early February, with full details published on 10 January.

=== Use of Article 49.3 ===
Article 49.3 of the French Constitution allows governments to bypass the National Assembly and force through bills without a vote. However, invoking it triggers a proviso that allows for no-confidence motions to be filed in the government. Because each party tends to only vote for their own motions and against those of others, on only one occasion, in 1962, where the Article has been triggered, the government lost a subsequent no-confidence motion.

On 14 March, The Guardian declared that Macron had two options – broker deals with Les Républicains or force the bill through using Article 49.3, "a measure that avoids an Assemblée nationale vote [the government] risks losing". They said that "[m]inisters have said the government would not use the 49.3, widely condemned as undemocratic and which risks inflaming a volatile public mood" and that "[i]nstead, there has been a flurry of negotiations by ministers to guarantee a majority in the lower house"; "[u]nion leaders have said using the 49.3 would lead to a hardening of opposition and would escalate strikes". On 16 March, it was said "[m]inutes before MPs in the lower house were to vote, Macron was still holding a series of frantic meetings with senior political figures, and suddenly chose to use special powers instead of risking a vote, which he appeared poised to lose". The decision to invoke was a "surprise, last-minute decision" by Macron, as "he was not certain of the support of enough lawmakers" to take the bill to a National Assembly vote.

The Guardian explained that 49.3's invoking "illustrates Macron's difficult position in parliament", with his parliamentary party/grouping having lost its majority in the National Assembly following the 2022 legislative election.

== Motivations ==
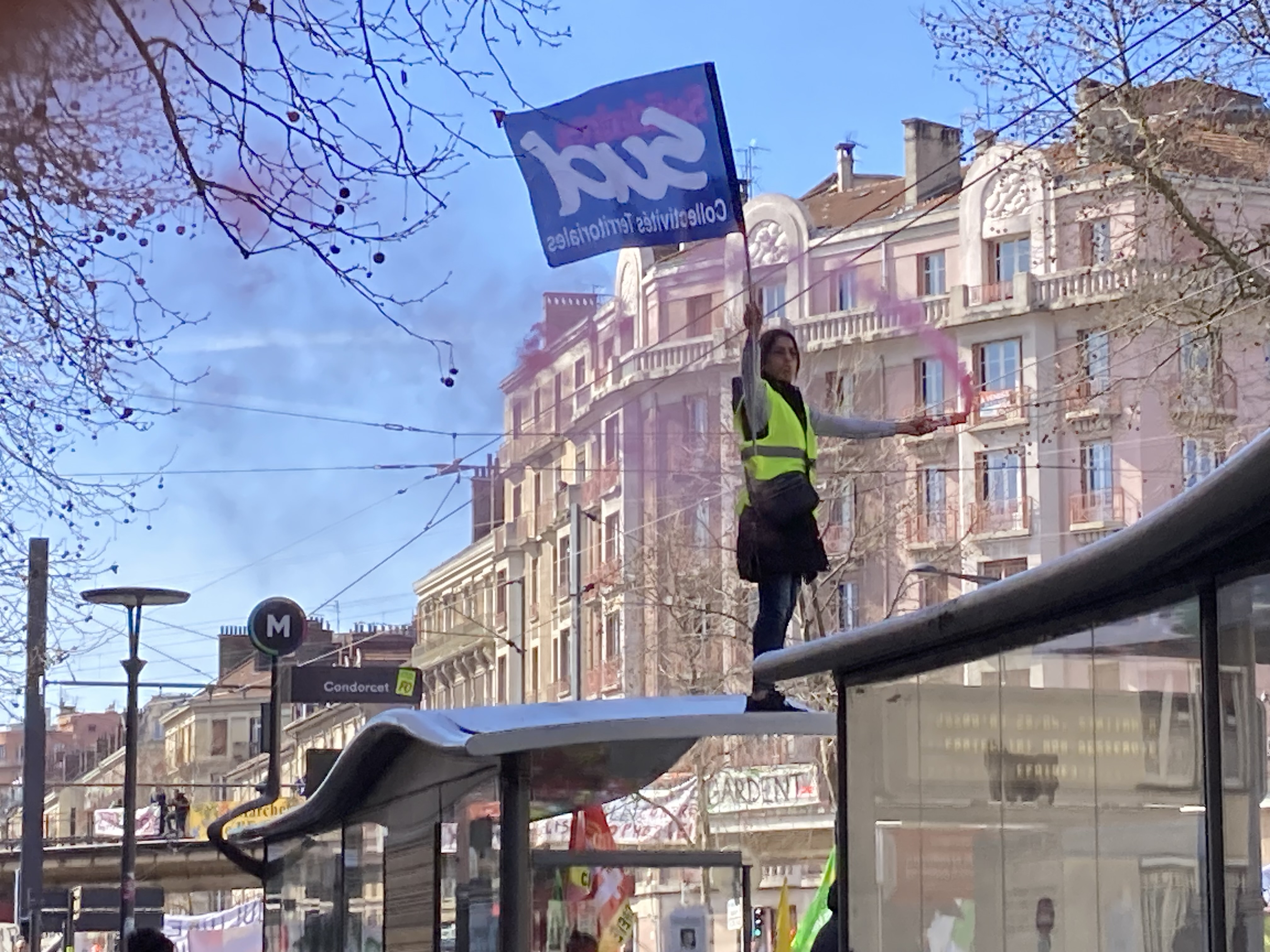
A protester waving a Sud union flag during protests in Grenoble on 15 March

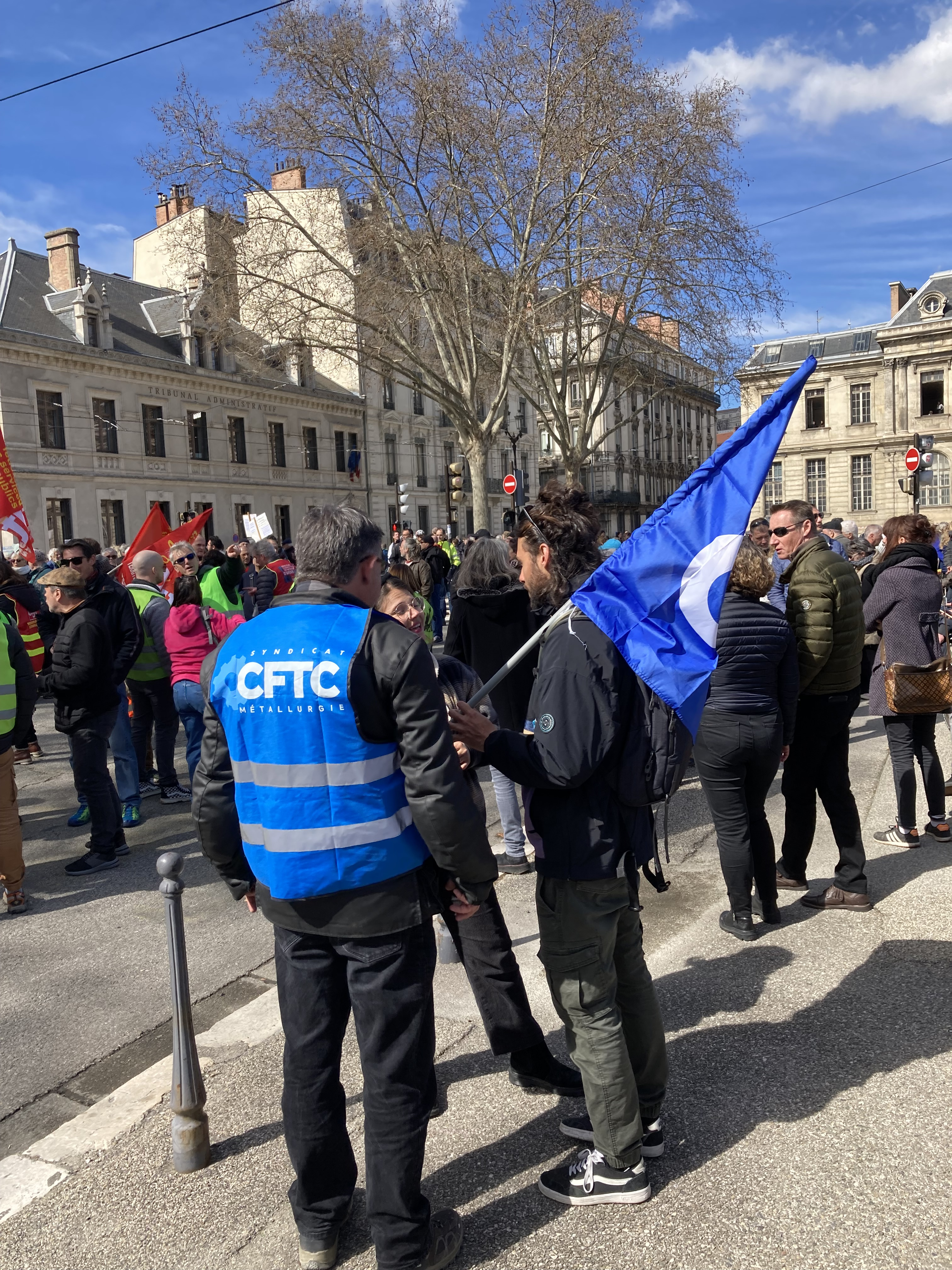
Protesters from the French Confederation of Christian Workers, metallurgy branch, during protests in Grenoble on 15 March

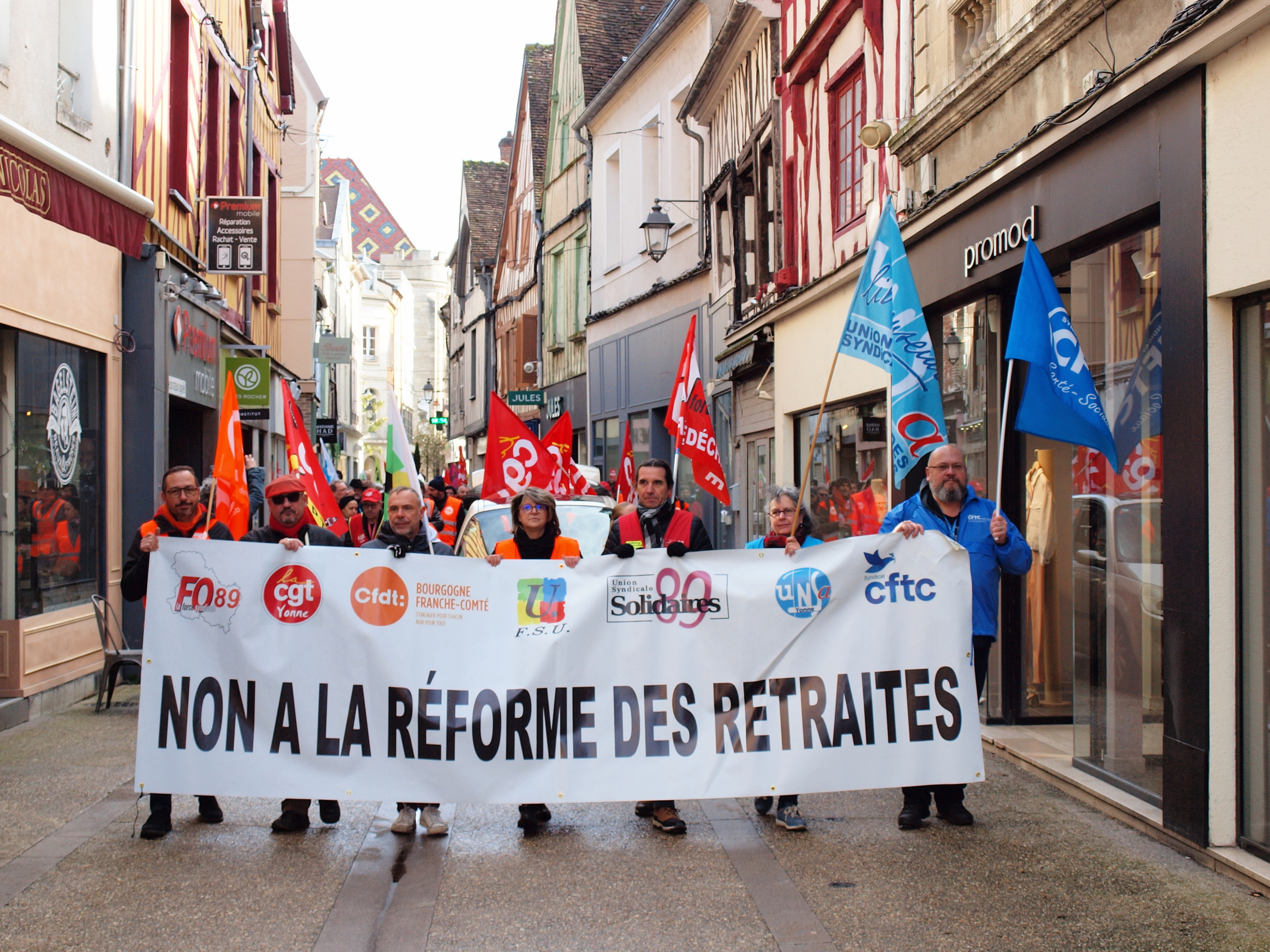

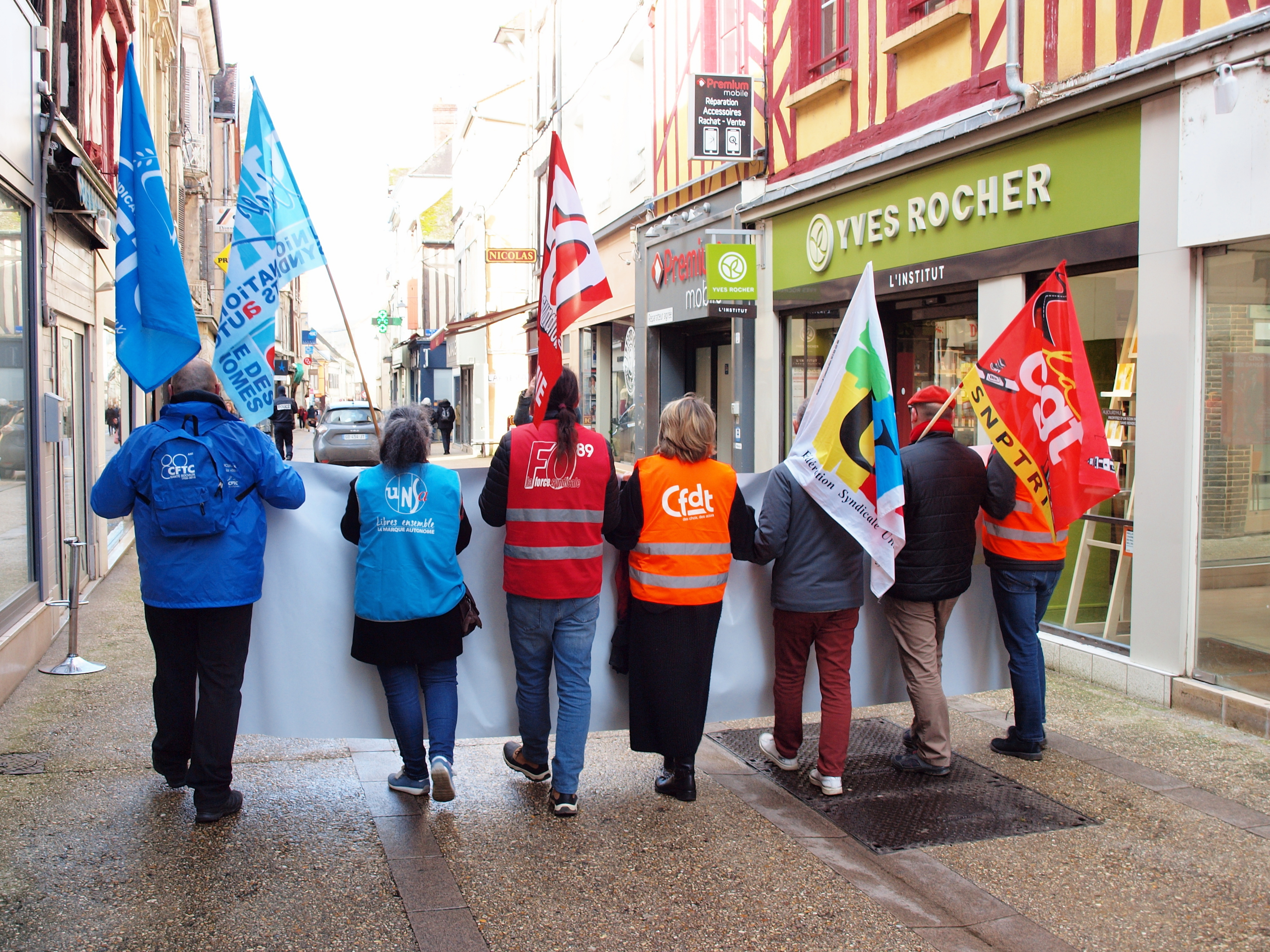
Members of seven different unions (CFTC, UNSA, FO, CFDT, FSU, CGT and Solidaires?) side-by-side, in a demonstration that walked through a shopping area in Sens on 11 March.

The coordination of the strikes by all of France's trade unions has been labelled a "rare show of unity", with transport and energy workers, teachers, dockers and public sector workers (such as museum staff) all having gone on strike. Trade unions "say the reform will penalise low-income people in manual jobs who tend to start their careers early, forcing them to work longer than graduates, who are less affected by the changes."

Polls have consistently shown that the measures are substantially unpopular, as well as the use of Article 49.3 to enact them without a parliamentary vote in the National Assembly. France 24 reported that a poll from a few days prior to the move suggested around "eight out of ten people opposed legislating in this way, including a majority of voters who backed Macron in the first round of last year's presidential election". The American Prospect opined that earlier support from conservative members of the National Assembly for the reforms had faded away as a result of polling that showed the reforms were unpopular. The decision to invoke Article 49.3 was seen by those on the left as "a major defeat and a sign of weakness" for the government, that would now be seen as "being brutal and undemocratic"; Antoine Bristielle, a representative of the Fondation Jean-Jaurès think tank, commented that using 49.3 is "perceived as a symbol of brutality" that could "erode support both for the government and democratic institutions". Le Journal du Dimanche reported that Macron's approval ratings hit a low comparable to the Yellow Jackets protests. In a poll spanning 9 to 16 March, 70% of respondents were dissatisfied with him and only 28% were satisfied.

It has been suggested that the reforms do not adequately tackle the disadvantage women are at within the workforce, who usually retire later than men and with pensions 40% lower in comparison, attributed to more part-time work and maternity leave. Women are already subject to later retirement due to taking time away from work to raise children. Euronews outlined that the reforms would lead to women retiring later and working, on average, seven months longer over the course of their life, while men would work around five months longer. They quoted Franck Riester, the Minister Delegate for Parliamentary Relations, admitting that women would be "a bit penalised by the reform" in January.

As well as this, it has been argued the reforms will hit the working-class and those who work in manual jobs disproportionately. CNN pointed out that blue-collar workers are likely to start working at a younger age than white-collar workers; The Washington Post pointed out that a minor part of those employed in 'physically or mentally demanding' jobs are still eligible to retire earlier with a full pension, which Macron previously removed most exceptions for allowing them to depart early in case of work induced disabilities although The New York Times equally pointed to how this was a concession by the government to "mollify opposition", which overall has failed because unions view the increase in the retirement age as a "non-starter" and was later removed as result of passing the age rise as a financial law. At the other end of the scale, it has been reported that some are concerned about "being forced to retire later because older adults who want to work but who lose their jobs often face age discrimination in the labor market".

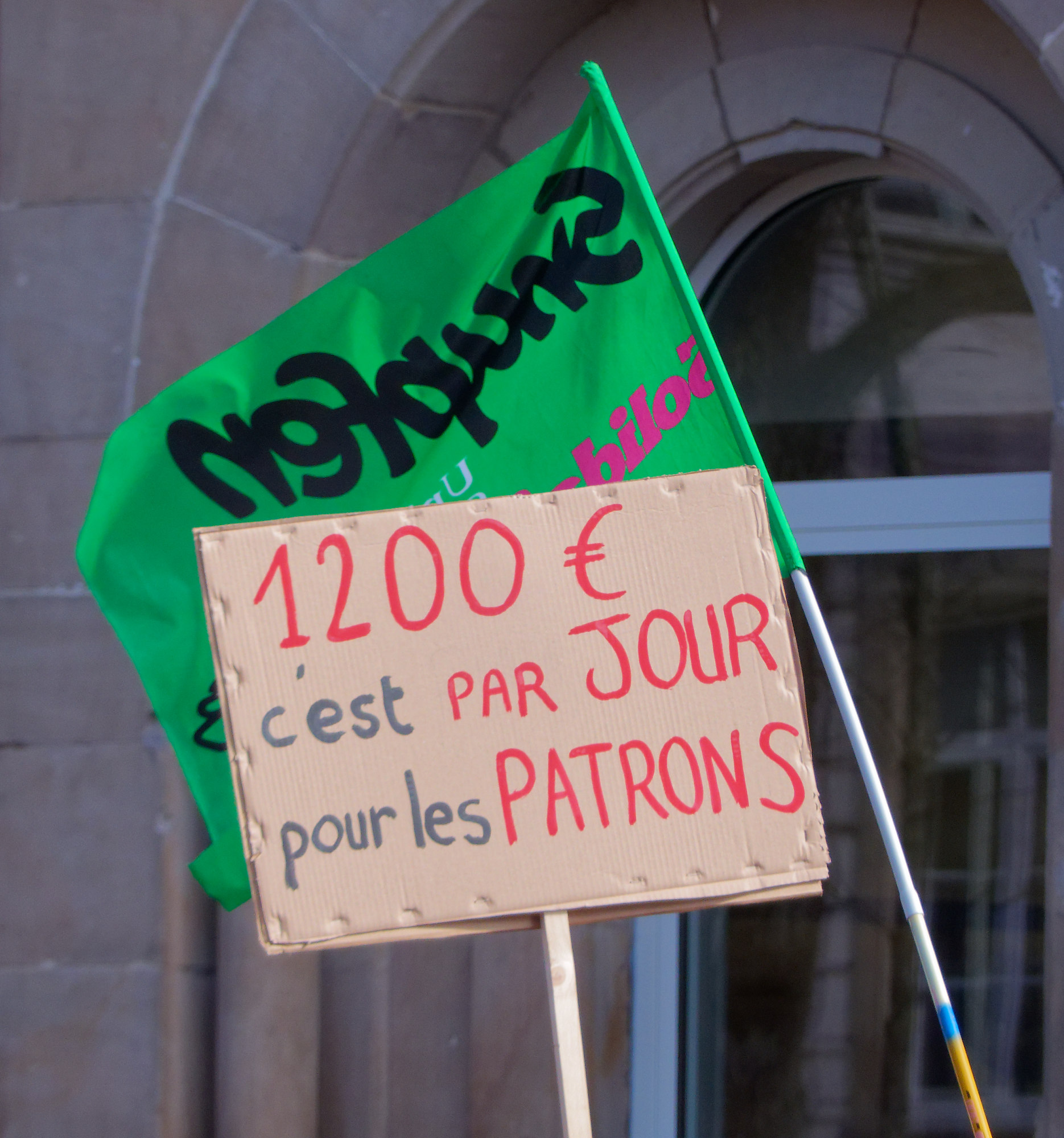
Protest placard in Belfort on 15 March, reading "€1200 per day for the bosses".

Those opposed to the reforms argue "the government is prioritizing businesses and people who are highly paid over average laborers", and have "disputed the need for urgency", The New York Times saying they contest that "Macron is attacking a cherished right to retirement and unfairly burdening blue-collar workers because of his refusal to increase taxes on the wealthy". In addition, opponents opine that Macron has "exaggerated the threat of projected deficits and refused to consider other ways to balance the system, like increasing worker payroll taxes, decoupling pensions from inflation or increasing taxes on wealthy households or companies", and that "the official body that monitors France's pension system has acknowledged that there is no immediate threat of bankruptcy and that long-term deficits", which Macron and the government have argued would occur if these reforms were not implemented, "were hard to accurately predict".

Jean Garrigues, a historian on France's political culture, theorized the unpopularity of the reforms can be partially attributed to Macron personally, given the "pre-existing anger against" him, having "struggled to shake off the image of an out-of-touch 'president of the rich'". He said that "[t]hat's why he has not only all the unions, but also a large part of public opinion against him", as "[b]y tying himself to the project, opposition to it is heightened, dramatized in a way."

It has been criticized for having taken place during a cost-of-living crisis, which some have attributed to worsening the anger and protests over the policies. The Times said that some have "questioned the political wisdom of going ahead with the reform at a time when the public mood has been soured by high inflation", as €7.1 billion of the €17.7 billion that "the reform was meant to have saved has been wiped out by modifications to its provisions".

== Rioting ==
The protests, in very minor part, gave way to instances of violence and rioting as demonstrators and police forces clashed in the streets.

=== Anti-union degradations ===
In Chambéry, "banners, sound systems, flags, and union tunics prepared for the 7 March demonstration went up in smoke" when fire was set to three vehicles parked in front of the Union hall. The methods used resembled those used in other degradations in the area in the preceding year, including a swastika and anti-vax slogans spray-painted on the regional health agency (ARS) offices.

=== Black bloc ===
There were black bloc groups at the front of the demonstrations in Paris, Lyon, and Nantes on May 1. There were between 2000 and 3000 in Paris, 1000 in Lyon (among 2000 the Rhône prefecture identified as "risky individuals"), and large numbers were also present in Nantes.

=== Looting ===
An unauthorized protest on 15 April attracted over 1000 people to downtown Rennes and permitted two men to make off with €25,000 worth of gold bars and coins from a gold seller's shop.

== Pre-Article 49.3 invoking ==
=== 19 January ===
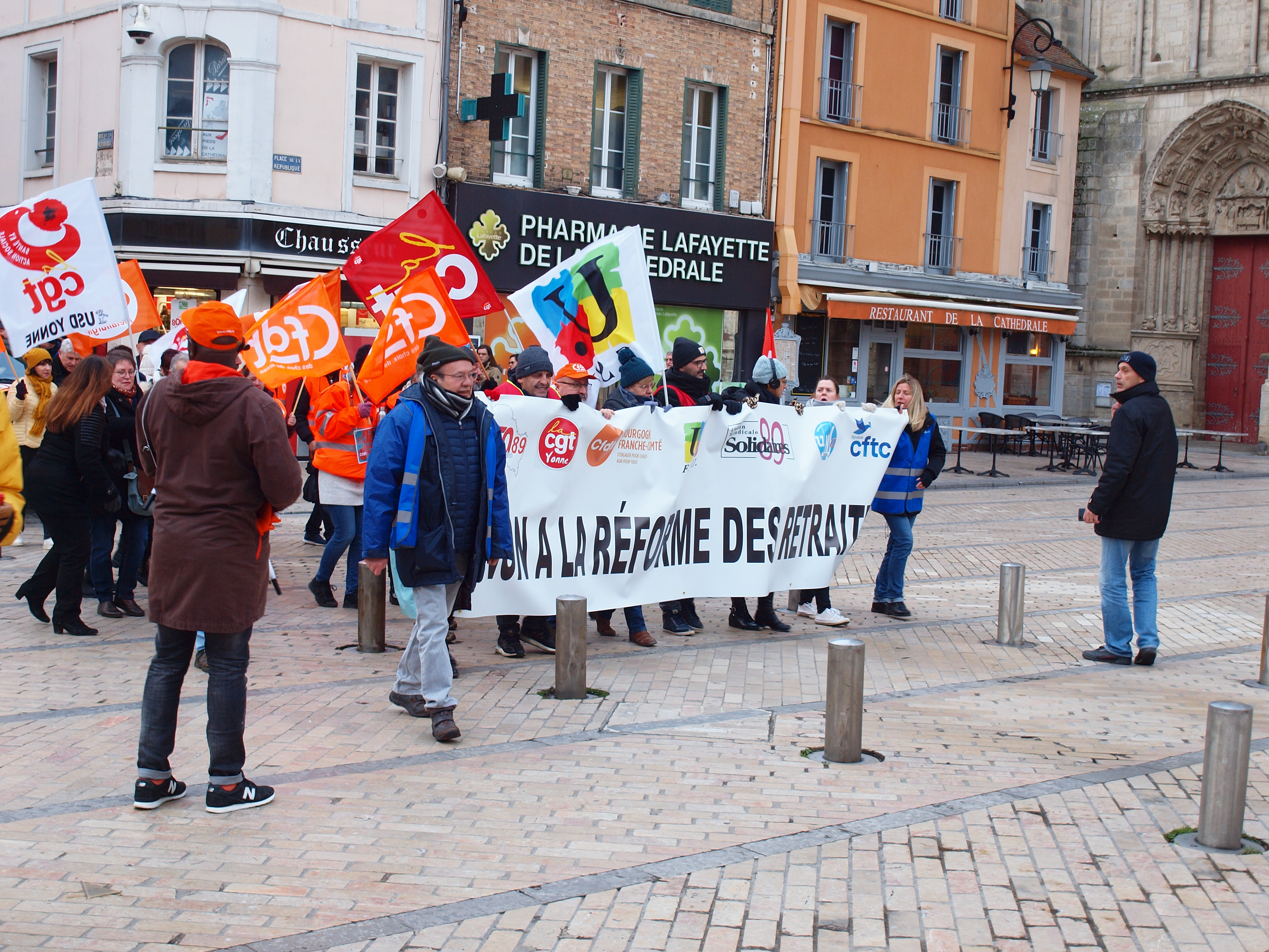
Demonstration against the pension reforms unveiled by French government, in Sens.

On 19 January, the Ministry of the Interior counted 1.12 million demonstrators, including 80,000 in Paris. Over 200 demonstrations were reported in the country.

More than one million people took to the streets in Paris and other French towns as part of countrywide protests over proposals to raise the retirement age. Eight of the largest unions participated in the strike over pension reforms. The French Ministry of the Interior said that 80,000 demonstrators gathered in the streets in Paris, where small numbers threw bottles, rocks, and fireworks at riot police. Over 200 demonstrations were reported in the country. According to the unions, 2 million people took part in the demonstrations with 400,000 of them participating in the Paris demonstrations.

Despite the demonstrations, Emmanuel Macron emphasized that the pension reforms would go forward. French unions declared that further strikes and protests would be held on 31 January in an effort to halt the government's plans to raise the standard retirement age from 62 to 64. The new law would increase annual pension contributions, from 41 to 43 payments throughout the year. Some flights out of Orly Airport were canceled, while the Eurostar website reported the cancellation of many routes between Paris and London. Though "a few delays" were reported at Charles de Gaulle Airport, owing to striking air traffic controllers, no flights were canceled.

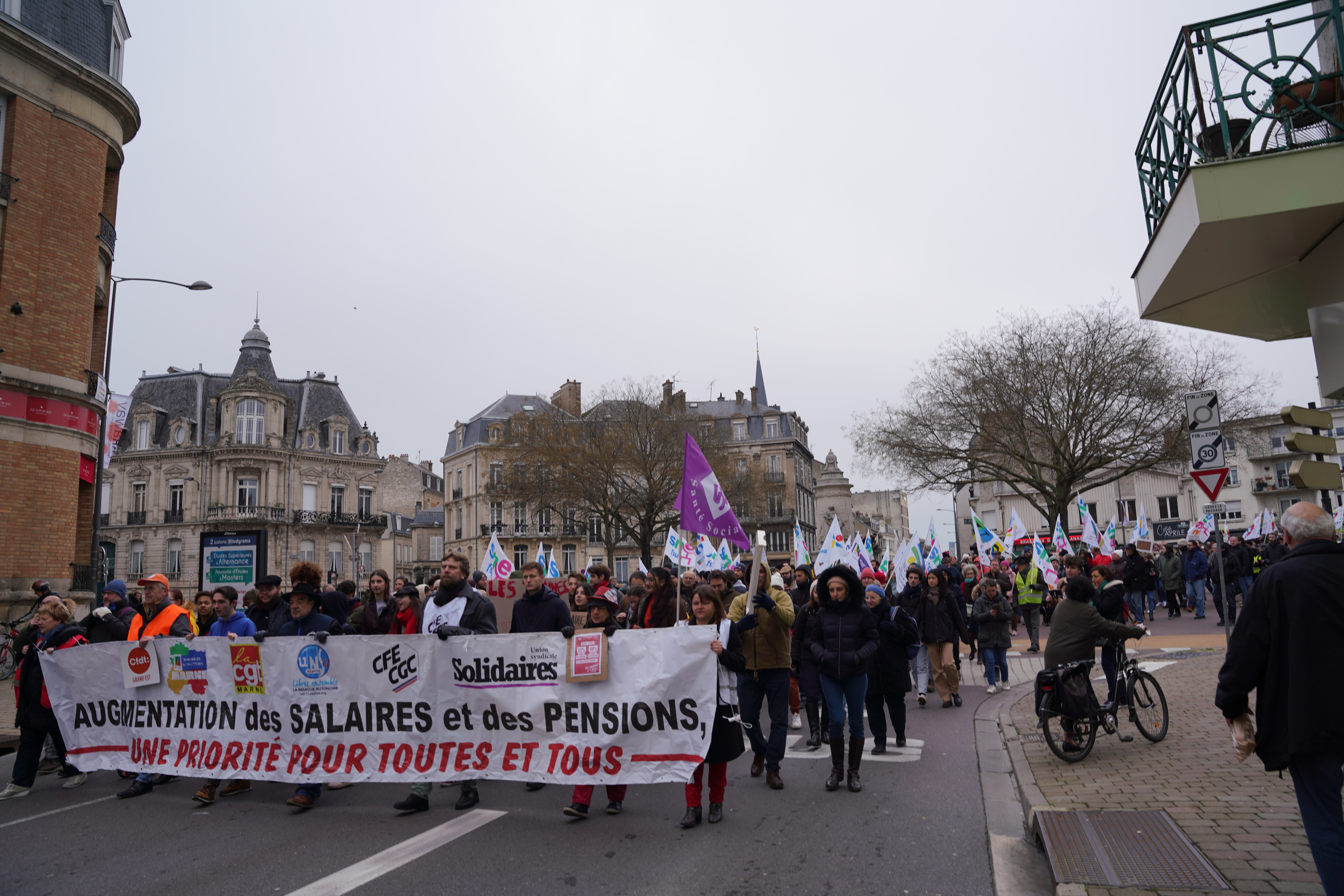
Reims on 19 January.

Number of demonstrators in the 10 most populated cities
City	According to the police	According to the unions
Paris	80,000	400,000
Marseille	26,000	140,000
Lyon	23,000	38,000
Toulouse	36,000	50,000
Nice	7,500	20,000
Nantes	40,000	75,000
Montpellier	15,000	25,000
Strasbourg	10,500	N/A (18,000 to 20,000 according to media sources)
Bordeaux	16,000	60,000
Lille	16,000	50,000

=== 21 January ===
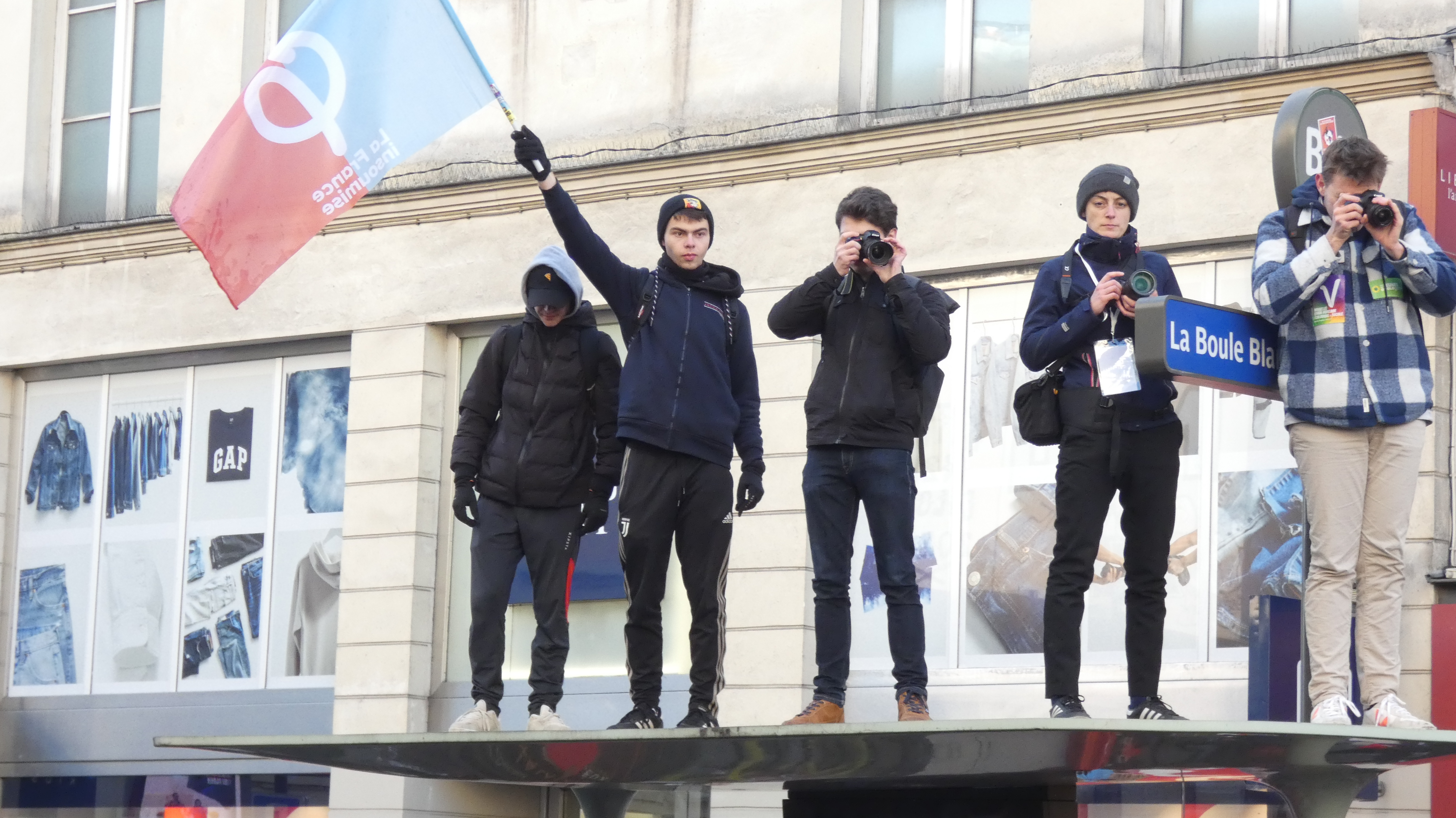
Paris on 21 January.

Another demonstration was organized in Paris on 21 January, supposedly long-planned by students and youth organisations.

Demonstrations organized by different groups took place in other cities, like in Dinan, Limoges and Lyon.

=== 31 January ===
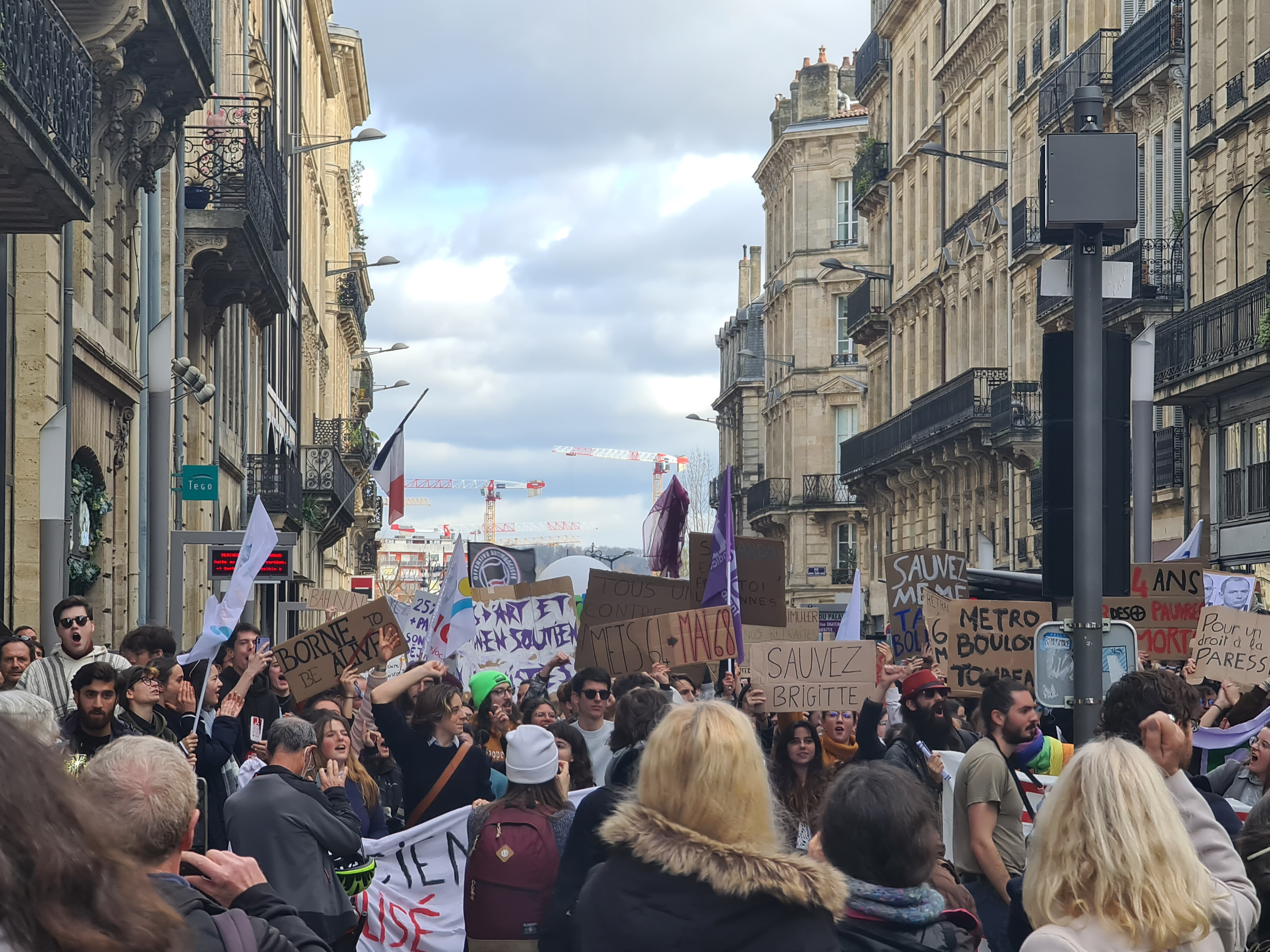
Demonstration in Bordeaux (Aquitaine, Occitania) on 31 January.

Demonstrations were organized around the country with public transport, schools, and electricity production specifically targeted by the strikes. Public television broadcasters were also affected by the strikes, with news broadcasts cancelled and music played instead.

According to the CGT union, 2.8 million people took part in the protests while the Ministry of Internal Affairs counted 1.272 million protesters.

Number of demonstrators in the 10 most populated cities
City	According to the police	According to the unions
Paris	87,000	500,000
Marseille	40,000	205,000
Lyon	23,000	45,000
Toulouse	34,000	80,000
Nice	7,000	25,000
Nantes	28,000	65,000
Montpellier	25,000	30,000
Strasbourg	10,500	22,000
Bordeaux	16,000	75,000
Lille	15,000	70,000

=== 7 February ===
On 7 February, a third day of national protests were held after being called by l'intersyndicale. According to the CGT, 400,000 people demonstrated in Paris, down 100,000 from the 31 of January. In total, over 2,000,000 strikers participated in demonstrations according to the CGT, while the police estimate that around 757,000 strikers participated in protests.

=== 11 February ===
On 11 February, a fourth day of national protests was held. According to the CGT, over 2,500,000 protesters took part in demonstrations, a rise of 500,000 compared to 7 February, while the Ministry of the Interior claims that 963,000 protested, a rise of over 200,000 compared to 7 February. In Paris, over 500,000 people demonstrated against the reform according to the CGT, while 93,000 demonstrated according to the prefecture. The Intersyndicale called for recurring strikes starting on 7 March.

=== 16 February ===
On 16 February, protesters joined fresh rallies and strikes. Unions said some 1.3 million people participated nationwide Thursday, the lowest figure since the protest movement started on January 19. The interior ministry put the national figure at 440,000, down from nearly a million on Saturday (11 Feb). On the day, 30 per cent of flights from Paris's Orly airport were cancelled.

=== 7 March ===
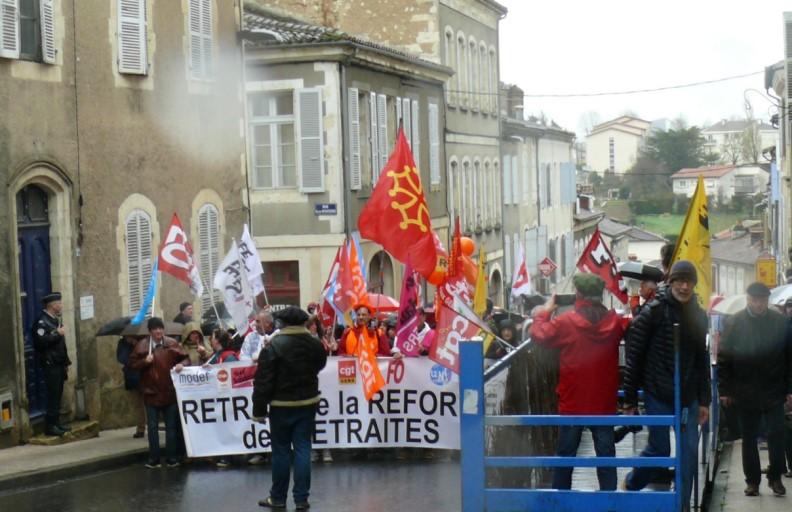
Auch (Occitania) on 11 March.

In early March, trains around the country continued to be affected by strikes and protests. It is believed that 1.1 to 1.4 million people participated in over 260 protests across the country. As a part of the protest, union members blocked fuel deliveries from being made, with the intention of bringing the French economy to its knees.

=== 11–12 March ===
On Saturday, 11 March, the seventh day of protests was held in response to the National Assembly and Senate debating the draft law, with a final vote expected that month. Macron twice declined meetings with unions that week. About 368,000 people protested, below the 800,000–1,000,000 expected. The following day, the Senate passed an initial vote by 195–112.

=== 15 March ===
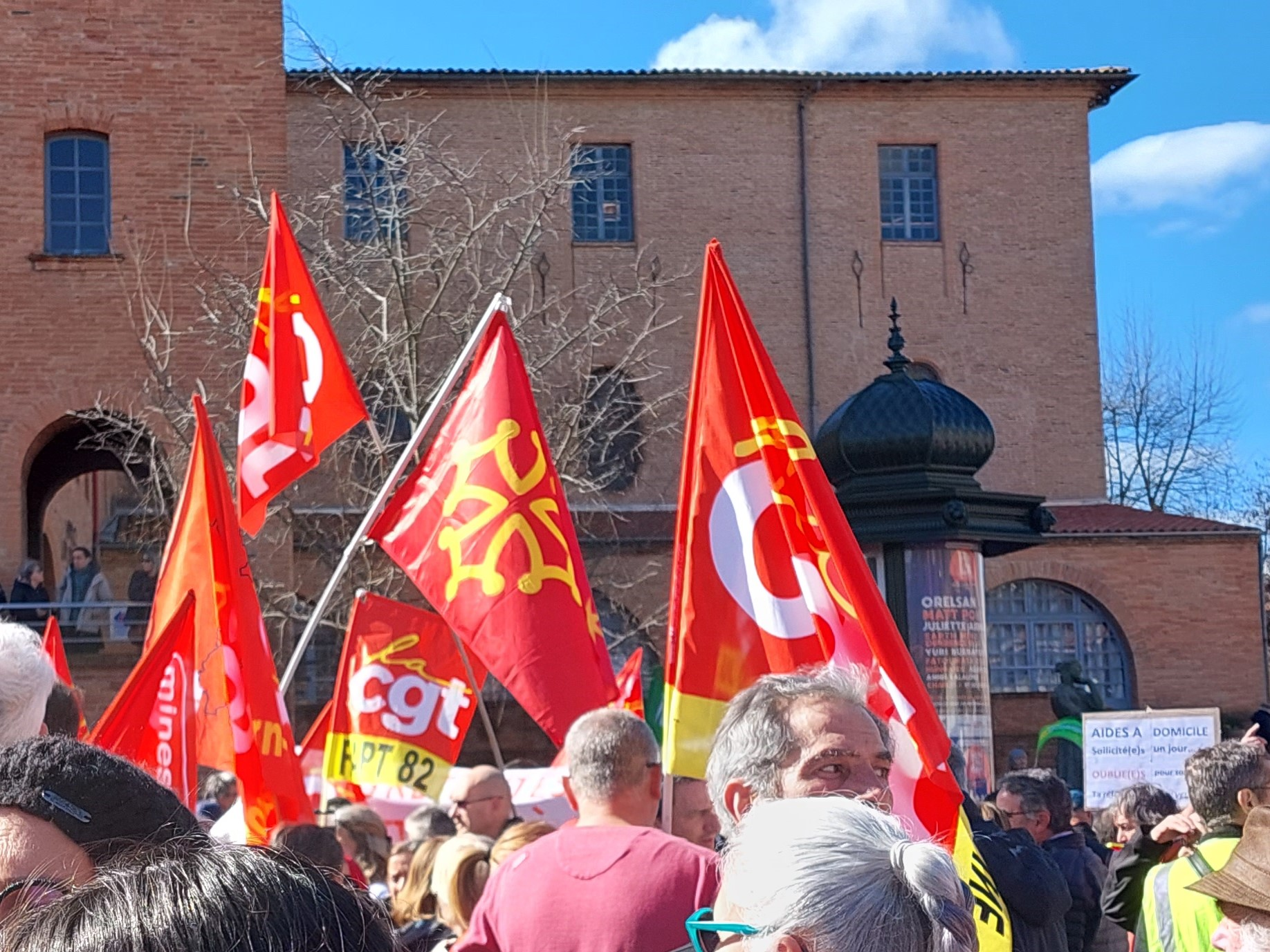
Montauban (Occitania) on 15 March: CGT flags

On 14 March, The Guardian reported that "French unions have called for a show of force with a final day of strikes and protests in the run-up" the vote on the reforms in the National Assembly, which would be the eighth day of national mobilisation sofar. Transport Minister Clément Beaune said "there would be disruption to public transport and flights, but it was unlikely to be a "Black Wednesday"", with "not ... the same level of disruptions as with previous mobilisations".

200 protests were reported to have taken place across the country. There were conflicting numbers of the strength of the protests; the Interior Ministry reported 480,000 marched throughout the country, with 37,000 in Paris, while CGT counted 1.78m and 450,000 respectively. Figures from Le Monde dispute both these claims. Reportedly, French police expected 650,000–850,000 protesters nationwide, fewer than the largest protests the previous week, with preliminary figures demonstrating a lower strike turnout in the energy and transport sectors at midday compared to previous days.

Among those who were on strike were train drivers, school teachers, dock workers, oil refinery workers, as well as garbage collectors continuing their now ten-day strike action.

In the afternoon, protesters gathered at the Esplanade des Invalides, with "loud music and huge union balloons". Police had ordered that the build-up of rubbish to be "cleared out along the march route" after some "used garbage to start fires or throw trash at police in recent demonstrations". The marchers were "accompanied by a heavy security force" as they "moved through the Left Bank along unencumbered streets". Police reported that one group of protestors "attacked a small business", and that nine people were detained within three hours of the march beginning. The protestors' march ended at the Place d'Italie. Known as "Greve 15 mars", it was co-ordinated and organised by eight trade unions.

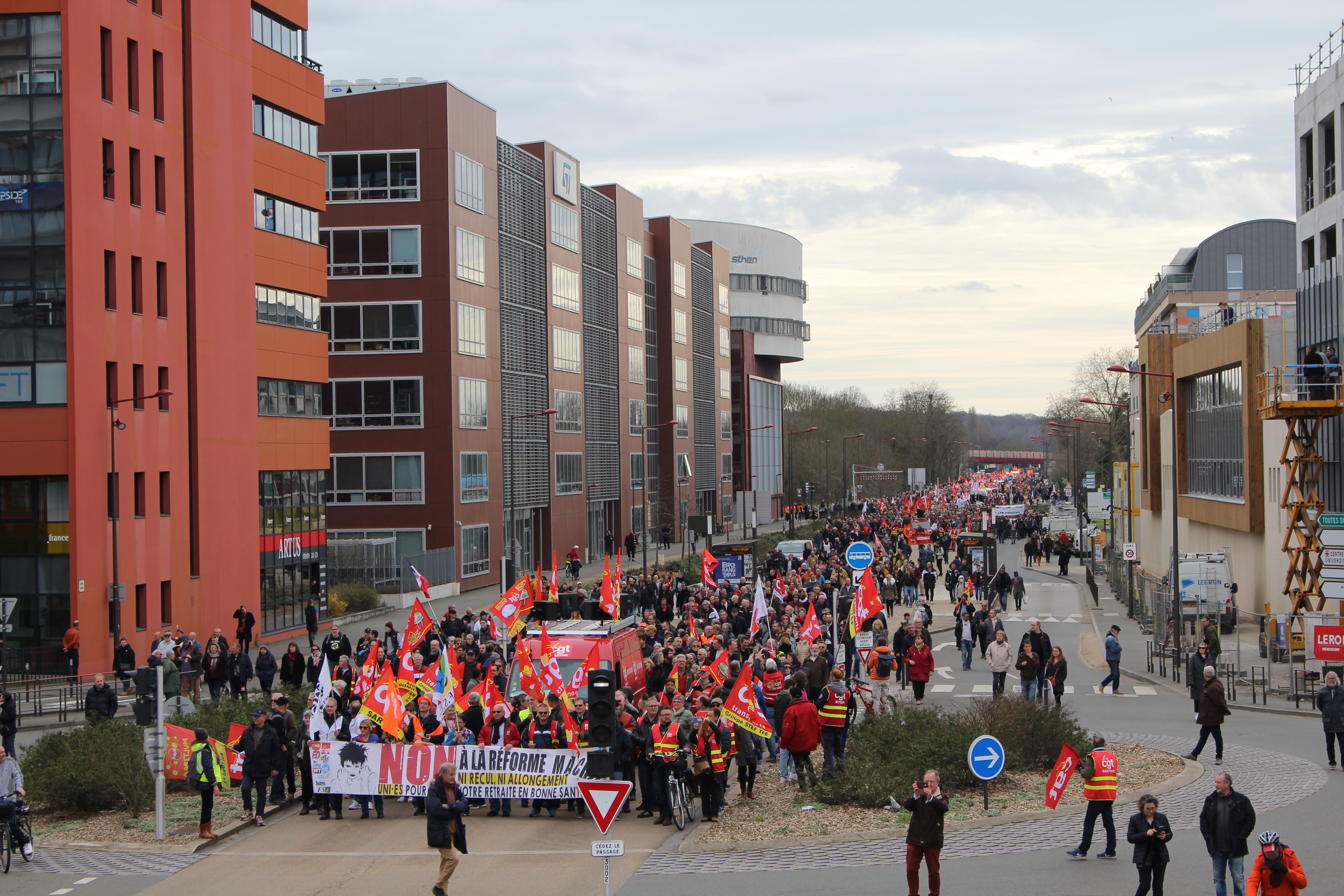
The front of the march organised by multiple trade unions on 15 March.

Liquefied natural gas operations were suspended, with public transport severely affected; it was stated that 40% of high-speed trains and half the regional trains were cancelled, with the Paris Métro running slower. The DGAC warned of delays, reporting that 20% of the flights at Paris-Orly airport were cancelled.

Elsewhere, in Rennes, Nantes, and Lyon, "[s]ecurity forces countered violence with charges and tear gas", according to French media. Demonstrations also took place in Le Havre in Normandy, Nice, and Mulhouse.

PBS reported that Interior Minister Gérald Darmanin had asked Paris City Hall to force some of the garbage workers to return to work, calling the build-up along the streets "a public health issue". Paris mayor Anne Hidalgo said that she supported the strike, and in response a government spokesman Olivier Véran declared that if she did not comply, the Interior Ministry would be "ready to act instead".

== Use of Article 49.3 and aftermath ==
=== 16 March ===
==== Use of Article 49.3 ====
Protests erupted after the announcement that the pension reforms would be enacted without a parliamentary vote, Borne invoking article 49:3 of the constitution to do so just "minutes" before the scheduled vote on the bill. Inside the National Assembly, opposition MPs on the left booed and jeered the announcement and sang the national anthem in order to prevent Borne from speaking, forcing the session to be briefly suspended before the announcement by Borne was made. Speaking to MPs who were booing her, Borne proclaimed that "[w]e cannot gamble on the future of our pensions ... The reform is necessary."

Marine Le Pen announced she would file a no-confidence motion in the government, describing the use of Article 49.3 as "an extraordinary confession of weakness," "a total failure for the government", and that Borne should resign. Fabien Roussel of the French Communist Party, who also "called on street protesters and trade unionists to keep mobilising", stated that the left was ready to make the same motion; Socialist Party leader Olivier Faure "accused Macron of deploying a "permanent coup d'état" to shove through the legislation". The Week said that "Macron and his government insist the reforms are needed to keep the pension system solvent and government borrowing acceptably low".

Politicians from across the political spectrum denounced the move. Conservative MPs, such as those from The Republicans, whom Macron has relied upon for support in votes in the National Assembly, "rebuke[d] the government, warning that its move would radicalise opponents and undercut the law's democratic legitimacy." The Times reported that Macron was thought to have "hoped earlier on Thursday to hold – and win – a parliamentary vote but changed tack after learning that only 35 of the 64 Republican MPs would back the reform, leaving him short of a majority", quoting Labor Minister Olivier Dussopt, who said that they "did everything [to have a vote] right up to the last minute". MoDem MPs, who are aligned with Macron's Renaissance group, said the decision to force the bill through "was a mistake"; Erwan Balanant said "he had left the parliament chamber "in a state of shock"", while "[o]ther centrist MPs said it was a waste and showed weakness".

==== Reaction by protesters ====
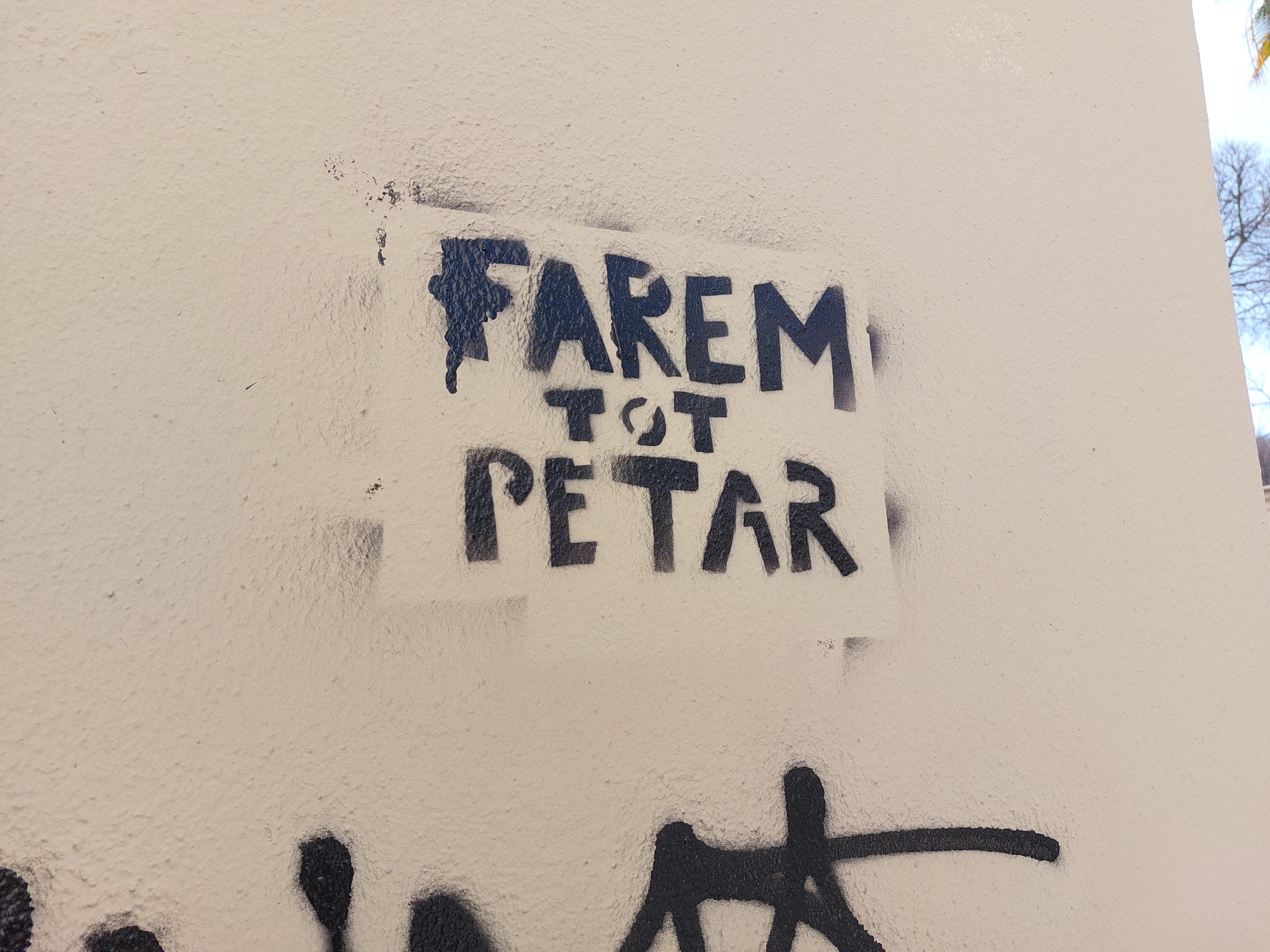
Warning by a tag on a wall in Marseille, "Farem tot petar" ("We will break everything", in Occitan)

In the Place de la Concorde, thousands protested (figures are disputed between 2,000 protesters and 7,000). France 24 reported that it was a "spontaneous and unplanned rally", but Le Monde stated that it was "organized by the union Solidaires and authorized by the administrative court". La France Insoumise leader Jean-Luc Mélenchon spoke to the crowd, declaring that Macron had gone "over the heads of the will of the people." He also claimed the reform had "no legitimacy – neither in parliament, nor in the street". It is possible that many joined the rally in Paris after being turned away by police from the "blockade of the Veolia warehouse in Aubervilliers".

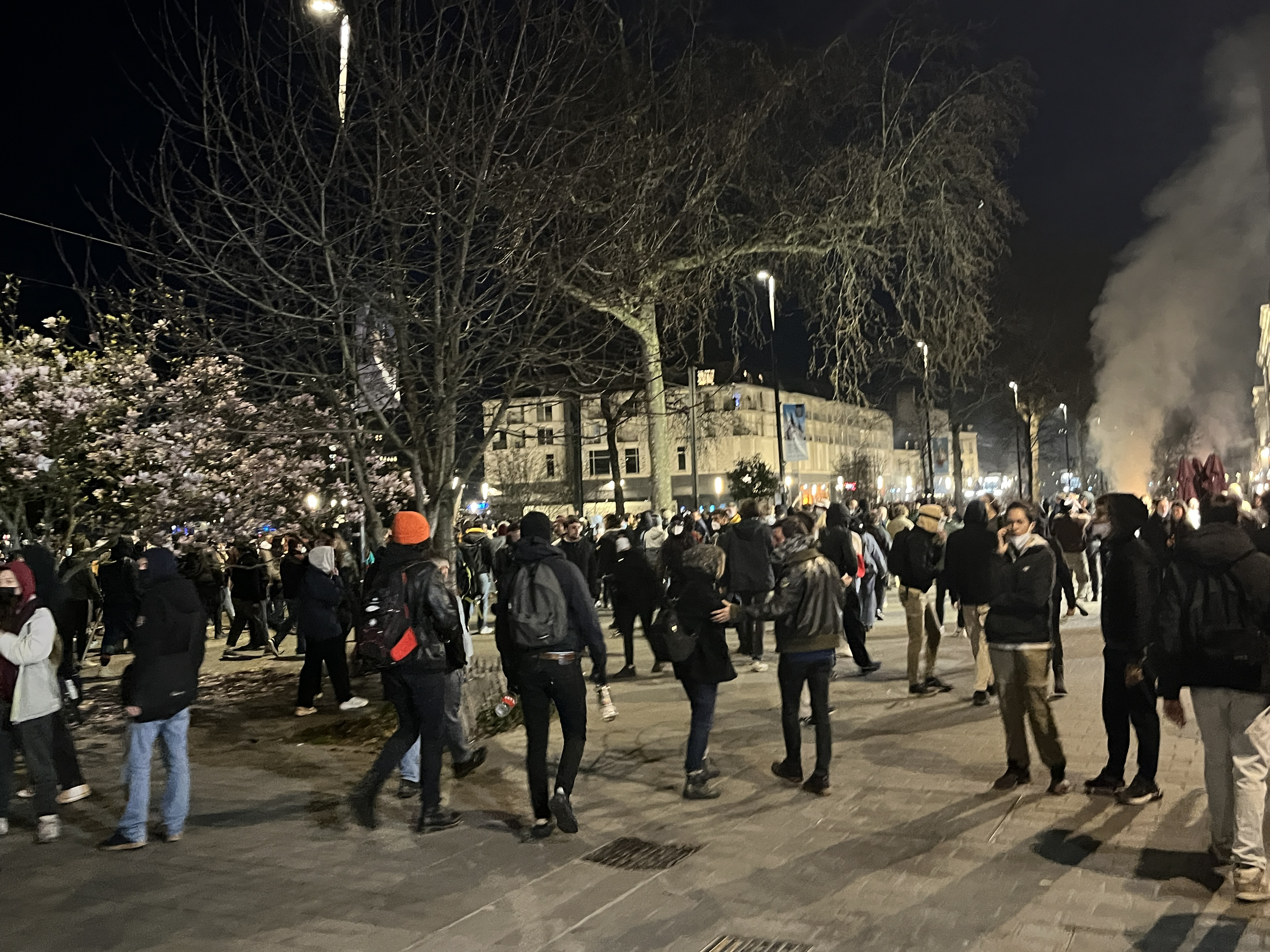
Demonstrations in Nantes in the evening of 16 March.

Later, a bonfire was lit, with police armed with shields and batons deploying tear gas in an attempt to clear the square at around 8pm. One police officer was reportedly injured.

By nightfall, 120 people were reported to have been arrested, according to Parisian police, "on suspicion of seeking to cause damage"; by 11:30pm, the number later rose to 217. Protesters in the Place were observed to have thrown cobbled stones at assembled police before they moved in to break up the groups, using tear gas and water cannons, with smaller sections of protesters running down side streets and setting smaller fires, such as to piles of garbage, and "caused damage to shop fronts". Numerous makeshift barricades in Paris streets were set alight.

The CGT announced further strikes and demonstrations for 23 March; its head, Philippe Martinez, said that the forcing through of the law "shows contempt towards the people", with unions describing the move by the government as "a complete denial of democracy". France 24 commented that "unionists were also out in strength, hailing a moral victory even as they denounced Macron's "violation of democracy"".

Protests took place in other cities, such as Rennes, Nantes, Lyon, Toulouse, and Marseille. In the latter, shop windows and bank fronts were smashed, for which "radical leftist groups" were partially blamed, with shops looted. Protests in the former three cities were reported to have resulted in clashes between protesters and police, and in Lyon consisted of approximately "400 people gathered in front of administrative offices, calling for the president to resign". There had been a brief blockade of the National Library early in the day.

The following day, Interior Minister Gérald Darmanin told RTL Radio that 310 had been arrested in relation to protest action nationwide, with 258 in Paris.

Macron made no public comment on 16 March, but AFP reported that "he told a closed-door cabinet meeting: "You cannot play with the future of the country.""

=== 17 March ===
Demonstrations once again took place at the Place de la Concorde, attended by several thousand people "with chants, dancing and a huge bonfire," protesters chanting "Tax the rich", before riot police intervened using tear gas to clear the square, after some "climbed scaffolding on a renovation site, arming themselves with wood", and "lobbed fireworks and paving stones at police in a standoff". On Twitter, a clip of protesters gathered at the Place chanting "we decapitated Louis XVI and we can start again, Macron" went viral, with protesters also, more generally, calling for Macron to resign. Broadcaster BFMTV reported that police detained 61 people following the protests. The Times claimed that the protestors' "ranks were swollen by members of the 'black bloc' – young masked troublemakers out for a fight". Notably, head of the 'moderate' CFDT union, Laurent Berger, said that a change in government or Prime Minister "will not put out this fire, only withdrawing the reform."

Additionally, Paris's Boulevard Périphérique was "disrupted at almost 200 points during peak rush hour" in the morning, by CGT activists. It was also reported that there was "escalated strikes" at refineries, with a blockade of an unspecified refinery in southern France having begun earlier in the day. A CGT representative claimed that strikes would "force the shutdown" of TotalEnergies' Normandy refinery by the weekend, furthering the industrial action; a rolling strike was already in place there, with strikers continuing to deliver less fuel than normal from other sites. (DW reported on 18 March that CGT had already shut it down by Friday evening, however.) The CGT also announced an extension to picket lines at Electricite de France.

Smaller protests and rallies took place in Bordeaux, Toulouse, Toulon and Strasbourg. Specific methods of protest across France reported were street furniture being destroyed, bins set alight, and windows smashed. In Dijon, protesters burned effigies of Macron. Protests also took place in smaller towns like Laval and Évreux.

Earlier in the day, police pepper-sprayed students protesting near Sorbonne University, with some also walking out of lectures. In Lille, the Institute of Political studies was blocked by student protesters. Strikers of the CGT union "voted to halt production at one of the country's largest refineries by this weekend or Monday at the latest", having "already been on a rolling strike at the northern site TotalEnergies de Normandie, and halting production would escalate the industrial action and spark fears of fuel shortages", with striking workers continuing to "deliver less fuel than normal from several other sites". In Bordeaux, "dozens" of protesters and demonstrators trespassed onto tracks at the main train station, including CGT unionists, with CGT and NPA flags being flown. In Donges, a roadblock was in place near to the TotalEnergie refinery oil terminals; in Valenciennes, striking workers blocked the entry of a fuel depot while police in riot gear were observed removing tyres from the road near it; striking rubbish collection workers clashed with police at the Ivry-sur-Seine incinerator; and the blockade of the port of Marseille by striking workers of the CGT continued. Unions from SNCF, the national train operator, "urged workers to continue another continuous strike".

A multi-party no-confidence motion was tabled in the National Assembly earlier in the day. Spearheaded by centrist group Liot, it was co-signed by NUPES, with a total of 91 MPs from five different parliamentary groups signing. Later in the day, National Rally filed a separate no-confidence motion, signed by 81 cross-party MPs; party leader Le Pen said the decision to push through the pension changes was "a total failure for the government".

On RTL radio, Interior Minister "warned against what he called the chaos of random, spontaneous street demonstrations", describing "[t]he opposition is legitimate, the protests are legitimate, but wreaking havoc is not, and "denounced the fact that effigies of Macron, Borne and other ministers were burned at a protest in Dijon" and that ""public buildings had been targeted". Aurore Bergé, head of Renaissance in parliament, wrote to Darmanin "asking him to ensure the protection of MPs who feared violence against them", because "she would not accept MPs living in "fear of reprisals"". He replied, saying "police would be vigilant against any violence directed towards lawmakers."

=== 18 March ===
On 18 March, it was announced protests in Paris were banned on the Place de la Concorde, opposite parliament, as well at the Champs-Élysées. Police explained this was due to "serious risks of disturbances to public order and security", and said those who did not obey this order could be fined. Nevertheless, a bonfire was lit at the Place de la Concorde, with an effigy of Macron dropped onto it to cheers. Despite this, widespread protests were still reported in Paris, with a rally instead planned for Place d'Italie in southern Paris at 6pm that evening, at which demonstrators chanted, once again, for Macron to resign, and "Macron is going to break down, we are going to win". 4,000 were present. Barricades were erected in the streets, rubbish bins were set alight, with the glass on billboards and bus shelters smashed. Barriers used to block the streets and bottles were thrown at riot police, who utilised tear gas and water cannons to disperse protesters. 81 arrests were made in the vicinity. protesters who gathered at the Place d'Italie then "marched toward Europe's biggest waste incineration plant, which has become a flashpoint of tensions", some setting trash cans alight and chanting mottos "such as "the streets are ours" as firefighter sirens wailed". Politico, quoting the Ministry of the Interior, later reported 122 had been arrested in Paris, with a total of 169 nationwide.

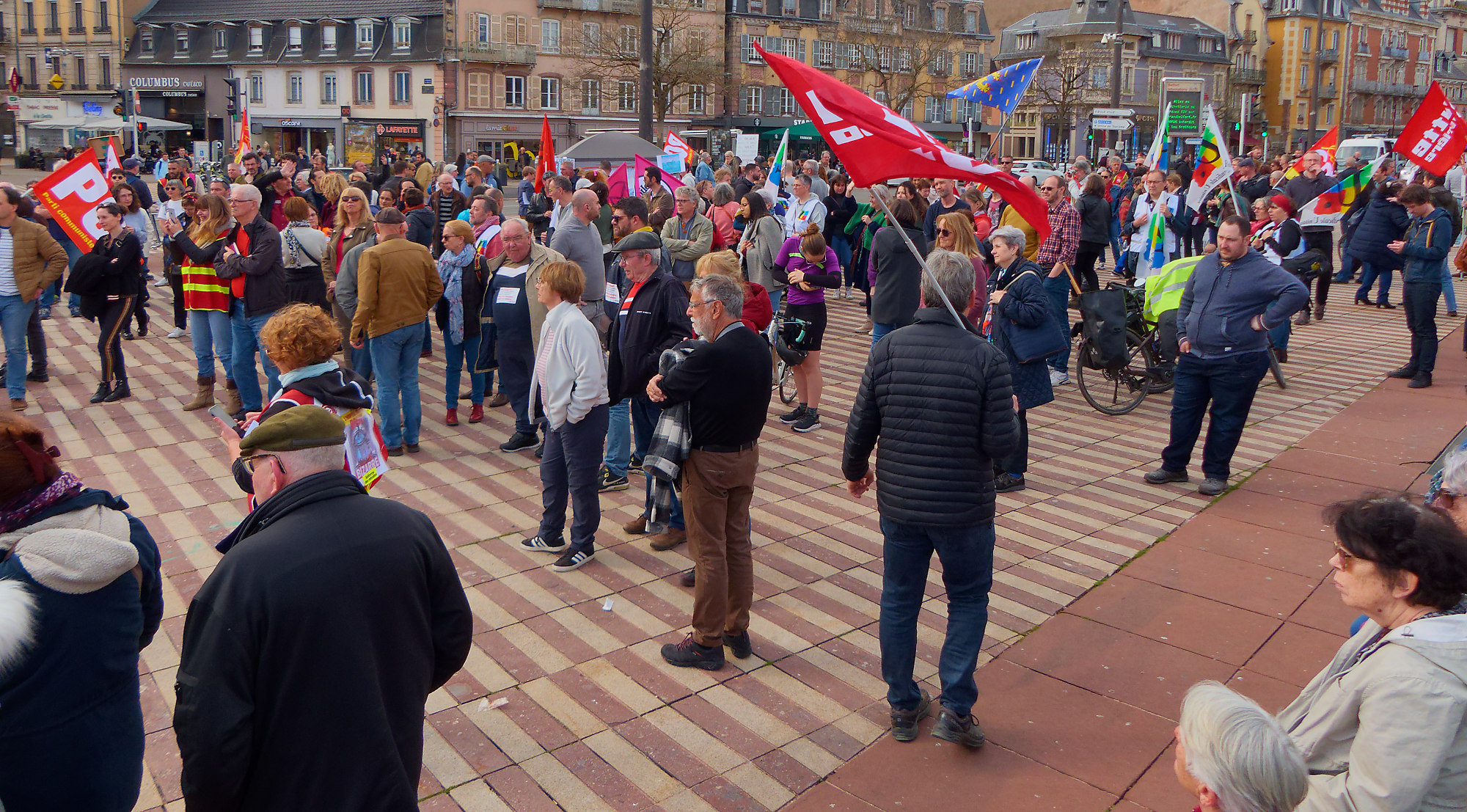
Gathering of demonstrators in Belfort on the afternoon of 18 March.

Police also used tear gas against protesters who started a fire in Bordeaux, as BFMTV showed demonstrations in major cities such as Marseille, Compiegne, Nantes (where around a thousand protested), Brest, and Montpellier, with around 200 protesting in Lodeve in the south of France. In Nice, the political office of the leader of the Republicans, Éric Ciotti, was ransacked, with tags left that threatened riots if the party refused to support any of the motions of no-confidence in the government. In the afternoon in Nantes, protestors threw bottles at police, who also responded with tear gas; in spite of this, DW described the protests in Nantes, as well as Marseille and Montpellier, as "mostly peaceful marches", as did the AP. They reported that in Marseille, protesters eluded police and occupied the main train station for approximately 15 minutes. In Besançon, "hundreds of demonstrators lit a brazier and burned voter cards. In Lyon, some demonstrators tried to break into a town hall and set it alight, with police arresting 36; police claimed that ""groups of violent individuals" triggered clashes".

A spokesperson for TotalEnergies reported that 37% of its operational staff at refineries and depots, such as at Feyzin and Normandy, were on strike. Rolling strikes also continued on railways. Students and activists from the Permanent Revolution collective "briefly invaded" the Forum des Halles shopping mall, with banners calling for a general strike and chanting for Paris to "stand up" and "rise up", and letting off red smoke canisters. A representative of a union representing waste collectors said strikers at three incinerators outside of Paris would allow some trucks through to "limit the risk of an epidemic", while police claimed trucks from five depots had restarted work. CGT announced "strikers were halting production at two refineries over the weekend".

CGT announced the shutdown of France's largest refinery, TotalEnergies' Gonfreville-L'Orcher (Seine-Maritime) site, and "at least two oil refineries might be shut down starting Monday". Industry Minister Roland Lescure announced the government could order those striking to return to work in order to help avoid fuel shortages.

AP reported that the DGAC had requested 30% of flights at Orly Airport to be cancelled, and 20% in Marseille, for Monday 20 March.

=== 19 March ===
"Hundreds" of protesters were reported in Paris, Lyon, Marseille, and Lille in the evening. In Marseille, a large bonfire was lit, with a large throng of demonstrators dancing around it.

Some neighbourhoods of Paris continued to have collection of waste disrupted; Philippe Martinez from CGT "urged" Paris collection workers to continue their now-two-week-long strike. A few hundred people protested outside the Les Halles shopping centre before police moved them on. Early on Sunday, "dozens" of union activists marched through a shopping mall in Rosny-sous-Bois, and cars were allowed to pass through the tolls on the A1 and A13 motorways for free during the day. Shutdowns of refineries continued, with reports of petrol queues building up in the south of France; authorities claimed that "supplies were high enough to avoid shortages".

In response to reports of constituency offices of various MPs being vandalized, Macron "called the speakers of both houses of parliament to affirm his support for all legislators and said the government was mobilized to "put everything in place to protect them" late on 19 March.

Macron also made his first public statement since 16 March; issued to AFP, he said that he hoped "the text on pensions can go to the end of its democratic journey with respect for all". Bruno Le Maire, the Finance Minister, commented further; "[t]hose among us who are able will gradually need to work more to finance our social model, which is one of the most generous in the world". Leader of the Republicans, Éric Ciotti, said his party would not back the no-confidence motions, as he "refuses to 'add chaos to chaos'"; consequently, it was expected that the motions would not pass, as the Republicans act as de facto kingmakers in the National Assembly, neither Macron's bloc or the other opposition parties combined numbering a majority. NUPES' Jean-Luc Mélenchon informed RTL that "[f]or as long as the 64-year reform is on the table, we have to keep it up, but decried the use of violence, advising protesters to not "make our struggle invisible with practices that would be turned against us, as "Macron... is counting on people going too far, so as to profit from a situation of fear." The Times reported that, in response to Ciotti's party refusing to support the motions, and that some Republican MPs may not follow their leader's decision, National Rally president Jordan Bardella was attempting to "persuade more to follow suit by promising his party will not put up candidates against them if the crisis does lead to an election".

=== 20 March ===
==== Morning and afternoon ====
DW reported, on 18 March, that union leaders were anticipating that some airports would see nearly a third of flights cancelled on 20 March, owing to strike action. easyJet and Ryanair, both British airlines, warned passengers to expect disruption. Ryanair said it was "expecting possible cancellations and delays on flights to and from France from 20 to 23 March." Eurostar announced that trains would run a normal service on 20 and 21 March, but there would be disruption to public transport in Lille on 20 March.

In the morning, rubbish piles were set alight around the ring road in Rennes as part of a road blockade, with protesters also blockading waste collection points and the nearby Vern-sur-Seiche oil depot was blockaded. The road blockade was attended by a "few hundred people". It began at 6:30am, and led to "over 15 miles of halted traffic around the city". Police used tear gas and charged towards protesters who were on the road and in surrounding fields. Shortly before midday, it was announced they had all been lifted. However, a damaged road in Porte de Saint-Malo meant the speed limit was temporarily reduced to 70 kilometers per hour. Crisis24 said that industrial action at oil refineries was "starting to impact fuel supplies", with shortages of fuel at stations, "particularly" in Marseille and the south of the country. Sky News, on 17 March, stated that garbage collection strikes are set to continue until at least 20 March.

SNCF has warned of "disruption to intercity and regional train services", with only two out of three trains running on several lines of Paris' RATP network. Crisis24 reported that such disruptions will continue until 23 March, when the national strike will exacerbate service provision.

On 17 March, teachers' unions called for strikes in the following weeks, possibly disrupting the baccalauréat exams, which begin on 20 March. CFDT's Laurent Berger proclaimed that she wished for no disruption to the exams as they could just worsen the already-high stress levels of the students taking them.

39% of TotalEnergie workers were on strike. Le Monde reported that half "of filling stations lacked one or more fuels in the southeastern region of Provence Alpes Côte d'Azur, requiring local authorities to limit sales until Thursday", with prohibition on the filling of jerry cans, and "many areas" in the west of the country affected by the continued blockade, and closure, of the Donges refinery. As well as this, they quoted figures from the UFIP oil lobby that 7% of the country's petrol stations were affected by fuel shortages, (up from 4% prior to the weekend; and that only 5–8 of 200 storage facilities were blocked) meaning "people in major cities in particular would be "suffering"; this was worse in some areas, as in Marseille, "around half of petrol stations are reporting shortages, with an estimated 40 per cent completely closed in Bouches-du-Rhône", and that "the Paris region could be hit by shortages at the storage facility of Genevilliers, northwest of the French capital". The "collaborative website" Penurie.mon-essence.fr said that approximately 986 fuel stations were "plagued by partial shortages", with 739 out of fuel "completely". Olivier Gantois, executive chairman of UFIP, said "[t]here will only be a shortage if people continue to rush to fill up", and that "[i]f customers panic, logistics will fail and we will be out of supply"; Le Monde added such comments were "in belief that shortages are the sole result of preemptive purchases on the part of consumers".

==== No-confidence votes ====
It was confirmed on 18 March that two no-confidence motions filed against the government will be debated beginning Monday, 20 March. The Republicans' leader has announced his intention not to support either motion, but The Times reported some LR MPs may defy him.

A poll found that over two-thirds of the French public wanted the no-confidence vote to succeed – despite the likelihood of it doing so being slim – and for Prime Minister Borne to resign regardless of its success or not.

The debate began at 4pm in the National Assembly, with opposition MPs "booing and jeering [the Prime Minister] when she took to the podium". She commented that the government "has never gone so far to form a compromise" to pass the pension reform laws. The author of the transpartisan motion, Charles de Courson, spoke that the removal of the government was "the only way of stopping the social and political crisis in this country". Éric Ciotti, leader of the Republicans, said invoking Article 49.3 was "a result of many years of political failures" that brought to the fore "a profound crisis in our constitution", but did not think the no-confidence votes was the solution required.

Both motions of no-confidence failed. The trans-partisan vote of no confidence failed by nine votes, while National Rally's no-confidence motion only received 94 votes, after other opposition parties declared their intention to not vote for it. Only 19 members of the Republicans voted for the transpartisan motion; France 24 commented that over half of the Republican MPs would have needed to vote in favour for the motion to pass.

Nevertheless, France 24 reported that NUPES MPs did not expect the transpartisan no-confidence vote they were part of to be so close. Immediately after, LFI MPs shouted "Resign!" at Prime Minister Borne, and held placards reading "We'll meet in the streets," while it was also reported left-wing MPs held up paper reading "On continue" ("We will continue") during the proclamation of the results. Prime Minister Borne tweeted that "We are coming to the end of the democratic process of this essential reform for our country. I assumed my responsibility and that of my government with humility and seriousness." She visited the Élysée presidential palace a short time after the government won the non-confidence votes. France 24 revealed that Macron was to meet Prime Minister Borne in the morning of 21 March, the speaker of the National Assembly and the head of the senate over lunch, and with MPs from his Renaissance bloc in the evening. Journalist Benjamin Dodman claimed that Borne et al. would use, and "spin", the success in the no-confidence motions as a measure of how "democratically legitimate" the pension reforms measures are.

France 24 noted some opposition MPs were "exploring legal avenues to challenge the law before the Constitutional Council, which must rule on the constitutionality of the reforms before they can be implemented"; the Council "could decide to strike down some or all of it – if it considers it breaches the constitution". Mélenchon "called on people to "express themselves everywhere and in all circumstances to force the withdrawal of the pension reform"". Mathilde Panot, LFI parliamentary group chief, told gathered press that "[n]othing is solved, we'll continue to do all we can so this reform is pulled back". Marine Le Pen called for Borne to resign, and that Macron, in spite of how unlikely it was, should call a referendum on the reforms; she told the press that "[he]'s deaf to what the French people want".

Results

=== Cross-party motion of no confidence ===
Motion of no confidence NUPES, LIOT; Tabled by Bertrand Pancher and 90 other Members
Ballot →	20 March 2023
Required majority →	287 out of 573
Votes in favour: • RN (88); • LFI (74); • SOC (31); • ECO (22); • GDR (22); • LR (19); • LIOT (18); • NI (4)	278 / 573
Abstentions or absentees (Note: In the French National Assembly, motions of no confidence are voted on by open ballot, with only those in favor of the motion taking part in the vote. Since a majority of the entire membership is required, those who are absent or do not cast a ballot are de facto voting against.)	295 / 573

=== Motion of no confidence by the RN ===
Motion of no confidence RN; Tabled by Marine Le Pen and 87 other Members
Ballot →	20 March 2023
Required majority →	287 out of 573
Votes in favour: • RN (88); • LR (3); • NI (2); • SOC (1)	94 / 573
Abstentions and absentees	479 / 573

==== Aftermath; evening ====
Spontaneous protests erupted throughout Paris. In the afternoon, those on the streets reacted to the results of the vote by chanting "Macron démission" ("Macron step down"). In the evening, in Place Vauban, protesters gathered, chanting "Macron resign!" and "Aux armes" (Take up arms), with police "push[ing] them back and blocked access to the square". Barricades were erected along the Rue de Rivoli. In Paris, protesters burned objects such as rubbish bins and bikes.

CNN reported "heavy police presence across the capital as demonstrators moved between locations", with AP quoting Paris police chief Laurent Nunez, who said the violence was "caused by groups of up to 300 people quickly moving through the capital". At least 70 people were arrested in Paris in the evening, which later rose to 234; most were arrested for setting rubbish strewn in the streets alight.

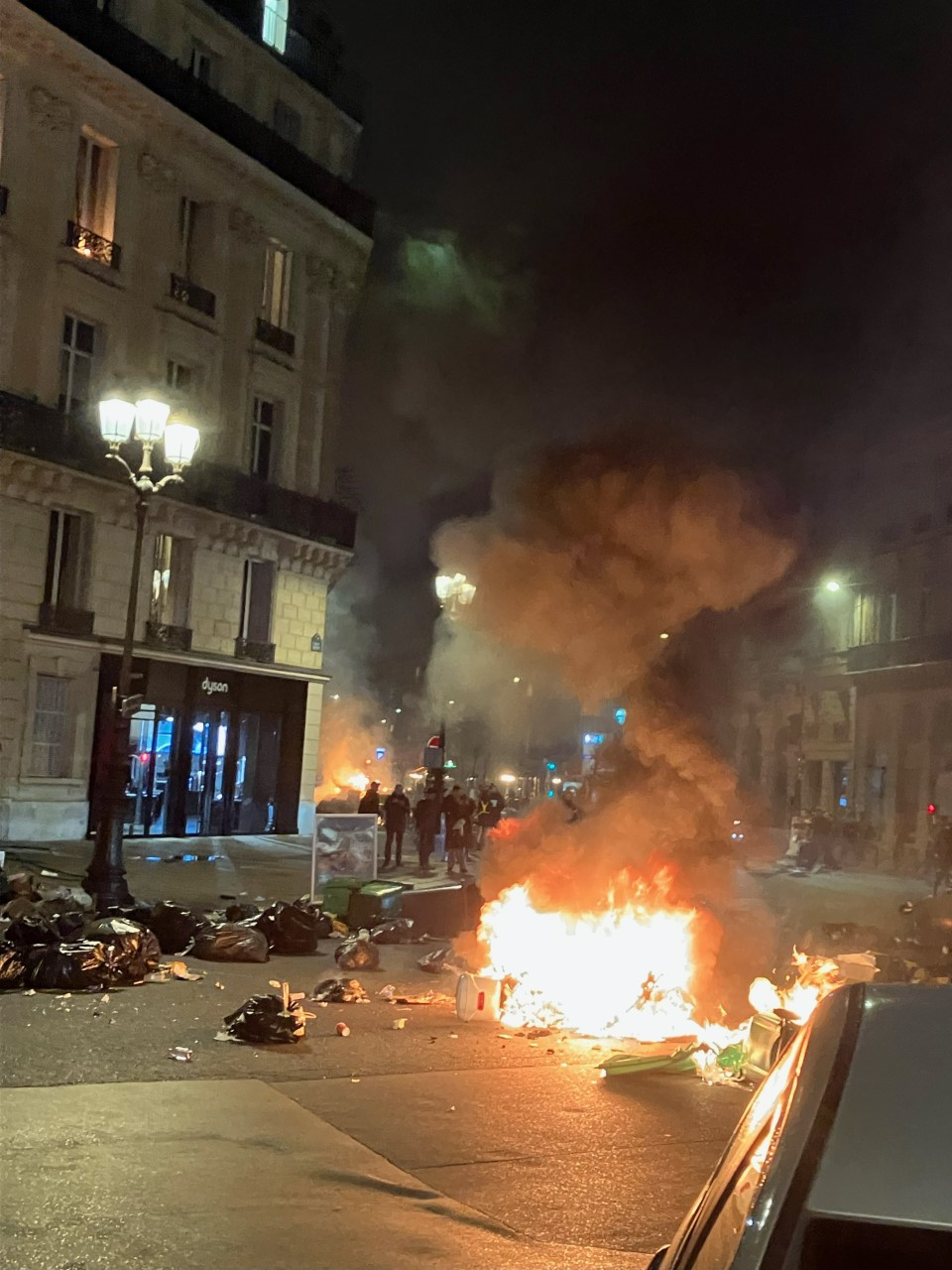
Bonfire on Place de l'Opéra in the evening of 20 March.

Reuters reported that "[i]n some of Paris' most prestigious avenues, firefighters scrambled to put out burning rubbish piles left uncollected for days due to strikes as protesters played cat-and-mouse with police" and "[u]nions and opposition parties said they would step up protests to try and force a u-turn". A CGT statement read that "[n]othing undermines the mobilisation of workers," and called for workers to 'step up' industrial action and "participate massively in rolling strikes and demonstrations." Nunez announced that an internal investigation would take place after footage of an officer punching a man walking backwards, causing him to fall to the ground, went viral on French social media.

AP said that the protests that took place in cities across France were predominantly "small" and "scattered", with only some "degenerating into violence" late in the day. In Bordeaux, a predominantly-young group of 200–300 people chanted for Macron to resign. A "couple" of rubbish bins were set alight, with the gathered protesters chanting "This will blow up". Protests were also reported in Dijon, and in Strasbourg where protestors smashed a department store's windows. 287 people in total were arrested nationwide.

The office of Prime Minister Borne announced late in the evening that she will "directly submit the text of the new law to France's Constitutional Council for a review", and that she hopes that "all the points raised during the debates can be examined"; referring, as France 24 says, to the challenges raised by some parliamentarians on the constitutionality of certain measures in the pension reforms. Opponents of the reforms on the left and far-right have submitted requests for review; only once the Constitutional Council has approved the bill can it be formally signed into law, and it can "reject articles within the measure if they aren't in line with the constitution", with those opposed saying the text "as a whole should be rejected"; Borne's office added that the referral was to "accelerate the process". Furthermore, she "expressed the government's 'solidarity'" towards the 400 police officers who were injured in recent days, with 42 alone overnight. The Constitutional Council has a month to "consider any objections" to the bill.

=== 21 March ===
On 21 March, Macron announced he does not intend to dissolve the National Assembly for new elections, reshuffle the government, or call a referendum for "a reform he considers necessary for the survival of the system", nor intends to withdraw the reforms. This was reasserted by Prime Minister Borne and Labor Minister Dussopt in Parliament; additionally, Borne said the government would attempt to involve the public and unions in legislating more in future, though offered no details as to how, and the two both agreed they had "devoted as much time to dialogue on the pension bill as possible". Macron, instead, plans to use a TV interview on 22 March to "calm things down" and plan and prepare for further reforms to take place over the rest of his term in office. Reuters reported on 21 March of the unease within the parties that Macron is aligned, or close, to, and that the President should not be "continuing business as usual amid violent protests and rolling strikes that represent the most serious challenge to the centrist president's authority since the "Yellow Vest" revolt". Gilles Le Gendre, a senior Renaissance MP, said that "the president, the government and the majority ... are all weakened" and that "it's not because the law was adopted that we can do business as usual". Also of Renaissance, Patrick Vignal "bluntly urged the president to suspend the pension reform bill" due to "the anger it has triggered, and its deep unpopularity".

Reuters quoted Eurointelligence analysts, who said Macron has two choices: "[p]retending that nothing major happened and letting the crisis wear itself out, or pursuing co-habitation with the willing in the assembly. Given Macron's nature, we see him being more attracted to the first option. A risky bet."

On 20 March, CNN reported that "[a]uthorities in charge of civil air traffic asked airlines to cancel 20% of their flights on Tuesday and Wednesday, and Air France warned of flight cancellations in the upcoming days".

Police "were sent in the early hours of Tuesday to unblock the oil terminal of Donges ... which had been occupied for a week by strikers. The Ministry of Energy Transition "also announced the requisition of "three employees per shift" at an oil storage facility in Fos-sur-Mer", due to "worsening supply tensions"; they clarified that "[t]he requisition is valid for 48 hours as needed, starting March 21," and relates to "personnel essential to the operation of the storage facility"".

"Hundreds" of workers have blocked access to the gas depots in a town near Marseille, with strikes at multiple refineries across western and southern France, "partially disrupt[ing]" oil shipments. Striking workers clashing with police at ExxonMobil's Fos-sur-Mer oil refinery, as the Energy Transition Ministry announced it would need employees "indispensable to the functioning" of the depot to return to work. "Scuffles broke out", with protesters joining strikers in response to the news. Protestors attempted to block access to the site, some "intermittently thr[owing] objects" such as stones at police, which used tear gas to try to disperse the demonstrators. AP added that the depot supplies fuel for southeastern France gas stations, which are currently most afflicted by shortages; government spokesman Olivier Veran "warned that more orders may follow in the coming days for other sites". In Paris, police Paris announced they had ordered rubbish collectors back to work to "ensure a 'minimum service'; this will cover 674 staff, with 206 garbage trucks resuming operation.

The Guardian, in an article dated 21 March, detailed activity at a blockaded incineration plant in Ivry-sur-Seine, south of Paris. A "crowd of students gathered to support the strikers" at the depot, with only "a slow dribble of very few rubbish trucks ... now passing each day" there. The blockade has been ongoing since at least 14 March, with some strikers and their supporters having attended as early as 5am over the course of the action.

In the morning, police had evacuated Paris 1 Panthéon-Sorbonne University's Tolbiac campus, having been previously blockaded and barricaded by students (which has notorious precedent in that regard); an attendee mentioned that many young students there had spoken of their experiences of police violence. Outside the École Duperré art school, students had "piled up a barricade of bins", with signs saying that the decision to raise the retirement age "would be met with a new May 1968"; one student interviewed said she was too frightened of being the victim of police violence at night to demonstrate at that time of day. Skips were set alight during a protest in Rennes.

=== 22 March ===
At lunchtime, Macron gave a televised interview, questioned by journalists from TF1 and France 2. He called the reform not a "luxury" or a "pleasure", but a "necessity", and that he did not "enjoy passing this reform", and "had a responsibility not to leave the issue alone despite its unpopularity". Of the protests, he "said protesters had a right to take to the streets and their anger had been taken into account, but it was not acceptable when they resorted to violence without any rules whatsoever", and he insisted he had continued confidence in Prime Minister Borne, and regrets "not succeeding in convincing people of the necessity of the reform".

The CGT and CFDT union heads responded; of the former, Philippe Martinez said that the interview was "outlandish", and "had taken millions of protesters for fools in claiming his reforms were the only alternative", and adding that "[t]he best response we can give the president is to have millions of people on strike and in the streets tomorrow," while Laurent Berger of the latter accusing Macron of "rewriting history and lying to hide his failure to secure a majority in parliament", with specific regard to his comments unions had not offered an alternative to the bill. Berger was quoted as having "scolded" the president for "seeking to portray the pension dispute as a tussle "between one responsible (man) and a group of irresponsibles"". Marine Le Pen said "she would not play "any part in putting out the fire" as the president was the only one who had the keys to a political crisis he had himself created", and, pointing out that the interview being broadcast during lunchtime news programmes mostly watched by pensioners – which Reuters stated was "the only demographic that is not dead set against the reform" – was an example of Macron's "disdain for workers", and how "[h]e insults all French people, in general, all those who ... are protesting".

Striking workers briefly blocked trains during a demonstration at Nice and Toulouse.

Additionally, it was reported that 13% of petrol stations are undergoing fuel shortages due to oil refinery blockades, and that "almost half the pumps in the Bouches-du-Rhône area of the south have run dry". Unions also said that "up to half of primary school teachers would go on strike as part of Thursday's day of action but demonstrations were continuing on Wednesday, including outside the southern port of Marseille-Fos". News.com.au reported that "[m]ajor fuel shortages are also impacting service stations across the country due to protesters blocking major locations, with the biggest nationwide protest on record for France recorded this week, with rallies held in more than 200 separate areas".

=== 23 March ===
CGT had announced on 16 March that the unions planned another day of strikes and demonstrations for 23 March, the ninth day of nationwide industrial action since the pension reform strikes began. The largest protest was expected to be in Paris, with demonstrators departing from Place de la Bastille at 2pm, marching through the city via Place de la République, and arriving at Place de l'Opéra at 7pm.

==== Strike action ====
Public transport was severely impacted by strikes. Only two Paris metro lines were running normal service. By late morning, there was large disruption to rail services across France, with SNCF saying that only one-in-three regional TER trains and one-in-two TGV or Ouigo services running. At Gare de Lyon train station, several hundred unionists and strikers demonstrated on the railway tracks. An unofficial protest in front of Terminal 1 at Charles de Gaulle Airport blocked vehicle access. The Directorate General of Civil Aviation warned of disruption to flights at Paris-Orly, Marseille-Provence, Lyon and Toulouse. Around 30% of flights at Paris Orly Airport were cancelled, and flight services were expected to be reduced through the weekend.

The Snuipp-FSU union said 40–50% of primary school teachers were on strike, with strong walkouts anticipated in Paris and departments such as Bouches-du-Rhône, Pyrénées-Orientales and Haute-Vienne. The Education Ministry stated that about 24% of primary and middle school teachers walked off the job, as well as 15% in high schools. Exam supervisors also went on strike, disrupting baccalauréat exams, with over half a million students impacted.

Workers voted to strike at an LNG terminal in Dunkirk, reducing output to the minimum. Amid oil refinery and depot blockades, 14% of petrol stations were experiencing shortages of at least one type of fuel, with 7% dry. The impact varied nationwide, with reports suggesting that 40 out of 96 departments are affected, particularly in the north in Brittany and Normandy, as well as the Mediterranean coast. The government mandated minimum staffing at all depots.

The entrance to Paris-Panthéon-Assas University, widely considered the top law school of France, was barricaded; France 24 commented this was "a sign of just how broad the protest movement has become". Major tourist attractions such as the Eiffel Tower, the Arc de Triomphe and the Versailles Palace were closed to the public.

==== Protests ====
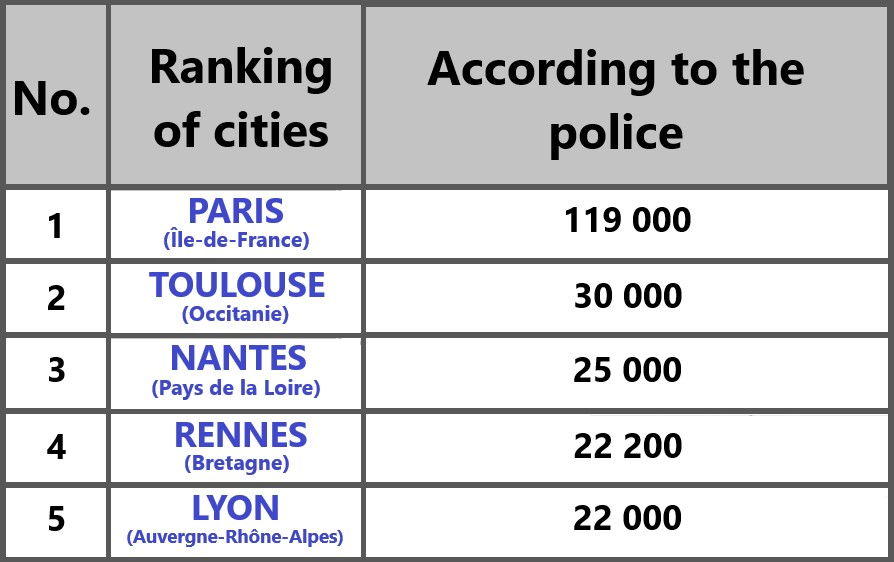
Number of protesters by city, according to numbers released by police.

The Independent claimed over "12,000 police officers have taken positions in French streets with 5,000 in Paris, as authorities brace for the biggest strike action".

Numbers of demonstrators vary. The Interior Ministry said up to 1.08m took part in protests across France, with 119,000 in Paris; the latter is the highest number to have protested in Paris since the strikes and protests related to the reforms began in January. The CGT union, meanwhile, claimed 3.5m nationwide, and 800,000 in Paris.

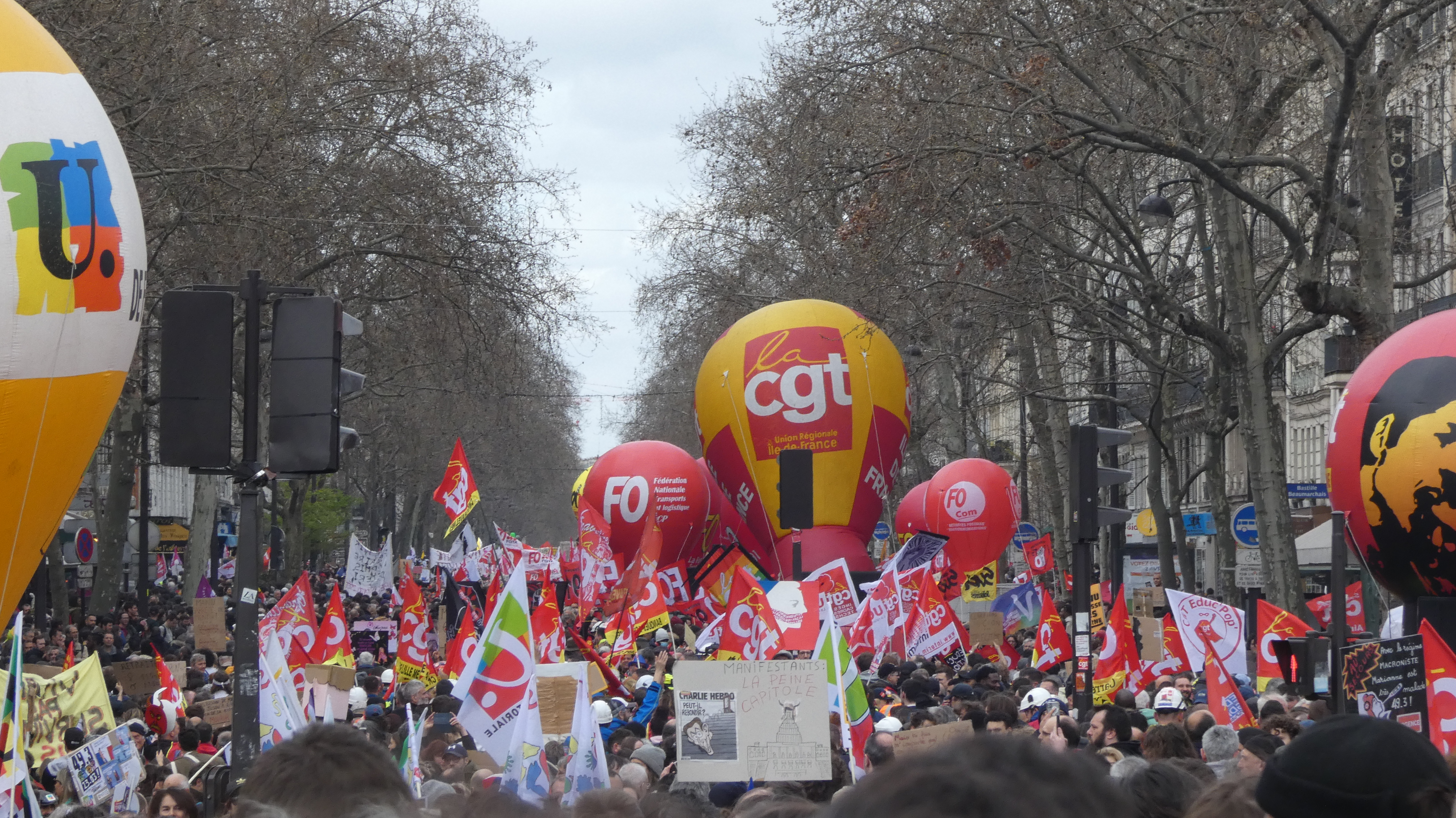
Demonstrators flying flags and balloons of various unions in Paris on 23 March.

Demonstrations in Paris began at the Place de la Bastille at 2pm local time. ITV News reported in the early afternoon that it was "currently the site of a large demonstration", and also that "[h]uge crowds have started marching in the major cities of Marseille, Lyon, Paris and Nantes as more than 250 protests were organised across the country".

Philippe Martinez, head of the CGT union said that "[t]here is a lot of anger, an explosive situation" at the start of a rally in Paris, as Reuters claimed that union leaders had "called for calm but were angry with what they called Macron's "provocative" comments". Posters along the route of the demonstrations in Paris included those demanding a return to the retirement age of 60, and depicting Macron as Louis XVI. A heavy presence of "[h]eavily armed riot police" was reported. At around 2:40pm GMT, journalist Lewis Goodall claimed that "[t]he main demonstration route [in Paris] is full [and so] they're now filing onto every side street". He quoted the CGT union's claims that 800,000 were demonstrating in Paris. At around 4:05pm GMT, he tweeted that French TV were reporting 14 were arrested so far, presumably in Paris.

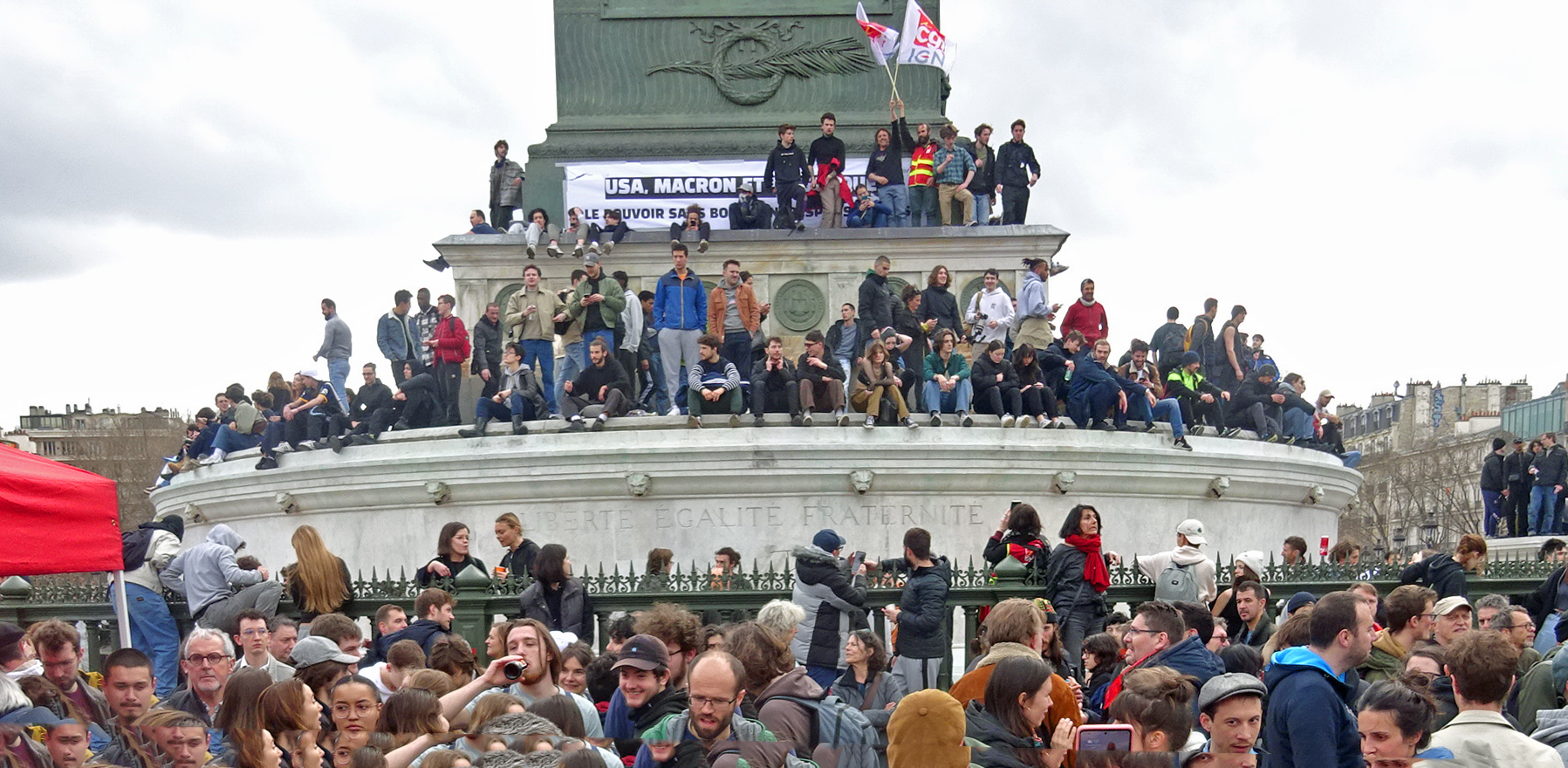
Demonstrators on the July Column.

BBC News said "the vast majority" of protests "passed off without violence", but in the afternoon, "violent clashes" were reported to have "broken out in parts of Paris", riot police having used tear gas as 'black bloc' protesters were reported to have thrown fireworks, bottles and stones at police and set bins alight. Riot police were also observed using baton charges on the Grands Boulevards. At other times on the march, fires in the streets ignited some of the uncollected piles of rubbish, with some small fires "visible from the junction of Rue Saint-Fiacre and Boulevard Poissonnière".

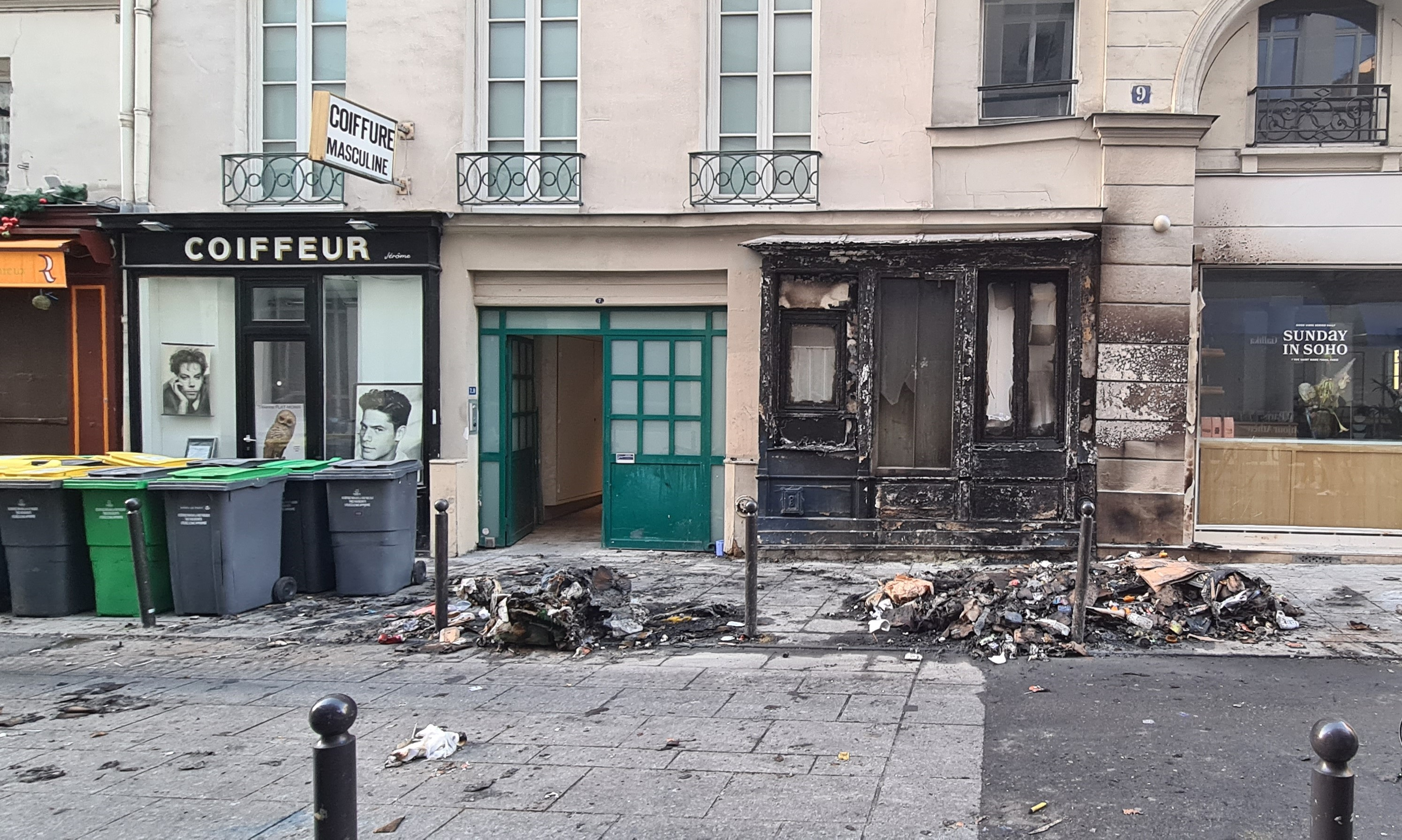
Aftermath of a fire on Rue Saint Marc.

Mid-afternoon, clashes between police and protesters in Paris had grown more intense. On the Boulevard Bonne Nouvelle, one BFMTV report said "the atmosphere has changed completely" and that "[w]e didn't expect it to get out of hand so quickly". BFMTV also reported that there were at least 350–400 'black bloc' protesters, using "big" fireworks, and at point targeting a Strasbourg-St Denis McDonald's restaurant. A reporter claimed that police are deploying tear gas to push back the crowds, but it was ineffective due to the large number of people attending the protest. The police estimated that there were 1,000 protestors engaged in violence.

By 5pm local time, demonstrators in Paris had converged on the Place de l'Opéra. Firecrackers and bins set alight around Avenue de l'Opéra were reported. At around 5:20pm, it was reported that police on motorbikes had arrived in the Opera area. Known as the Motos Brav-M, it is a "controversial police unit", as "some have accused [them] of using excessive force". They were "booed and hissed" at as they "passed further away down Boulevard de l'Opéra". By 6pm, "most people [were] now dispersing", but "low-level clashes between police and small groups of rioters [who have] been throwing stones and starting fires" persisted. Up to 5,000 security staff were put on duty in Paris for the day.

Protesters and demonstrations in Le Mans
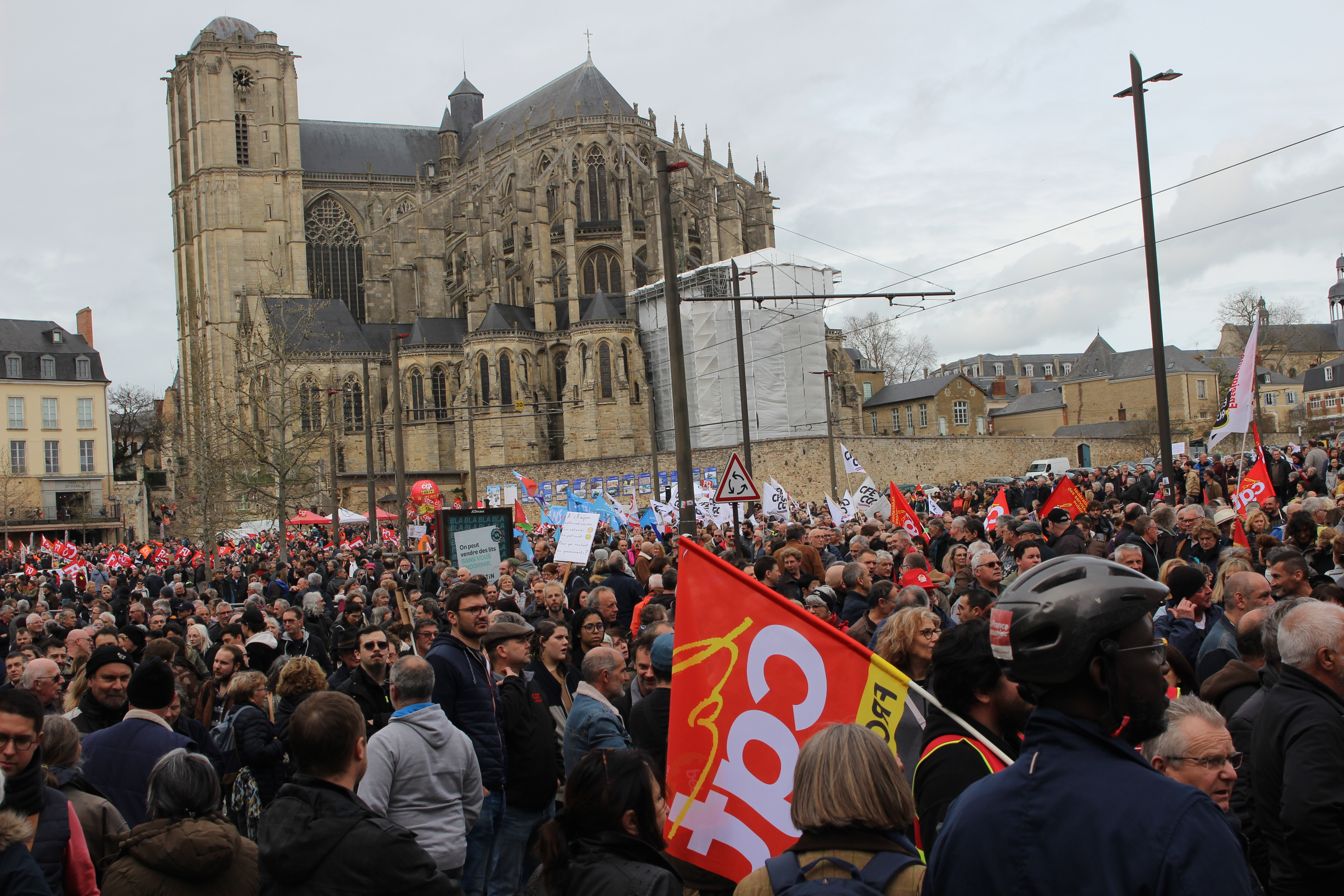
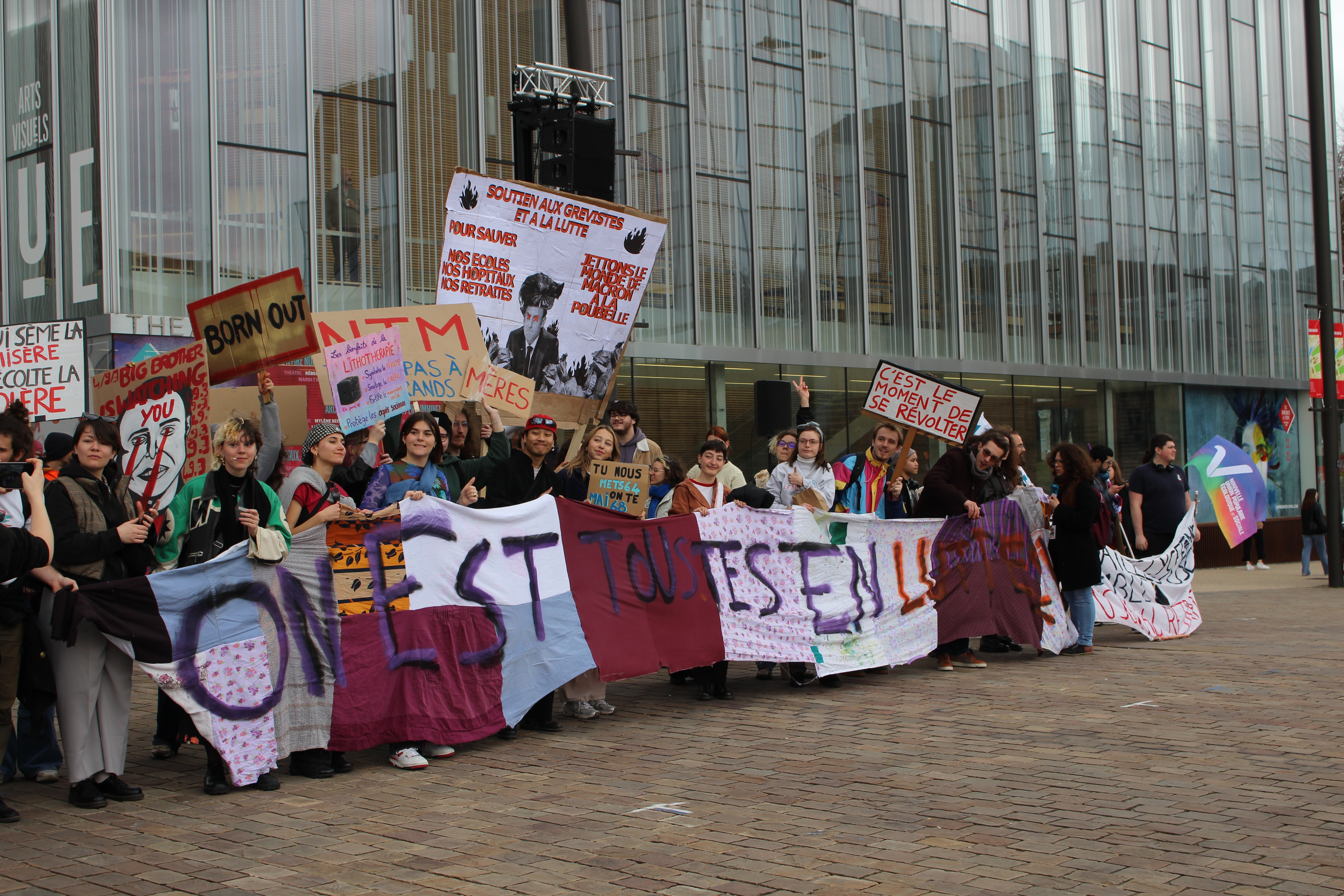

320 protests were planned across the country, with the biggest demonstrations in the southern towns of Marseille, Nice, and Toulon; in the former two, "thousands of protesters" demonstrated. Marseille's port was blockaded by demonstrators for a second consecutive day. In Lyon, "hundreds of railway workers, students and others have taken to the tracks disrupting trains". In Normandy, "thousands" turned out in Rouen, Caen, Le Havre and Dieppe. In Rouen, riot police used tear gas against some protesters throwing stones, and in Rennes, used both tear gas and water cannons as "some masked protesters" erected barricades". In Nice, protesters converged on the city centre, before marching to the airport and forming a blockade.

Yahoo! quoted local media that stated almost 10,000 were marching in Tours, where protesters blocked train tracks and caused disruption to train departures. Smoke was observed rising from burning debris that blocked traffic on a Toulouse highway, as "wildcat strikes briefly blocked roads in other cities". Police fired tear gas at protesters in Nantes, where also "a group of activists stormed the administrative court", and used water cannons in Rennes.

In Lorient, a local newspaper reported that projectiles were thrown into the yard of the police station, having "triggered a brief fire", with claims that multiple police officers had been "violently attacked". A local prefecture office also "came under attack" in the town, The Times claiming that activists "sought to storm a government building and to set fire to the town's police station". Interior Minister Gérald Darmanin responded on Twitter: "The attacks on and defacing of the subprefecture and the police station in Lorient are unacceptable. Thoughts with the injured officers. These acts cannot go unpunished."

The Independent reported that a "video on social media showed several trucks dumping tyres, rubbish and manure in front of council offices in several locations", and "[h]ighways were blocked with barriers of burning wood and tyres as protesters raised slogans".

The Palais Rohan in Bordeaux was set on fire by protesters, affecting the front door, though the fire was put out promptly by firefighters.

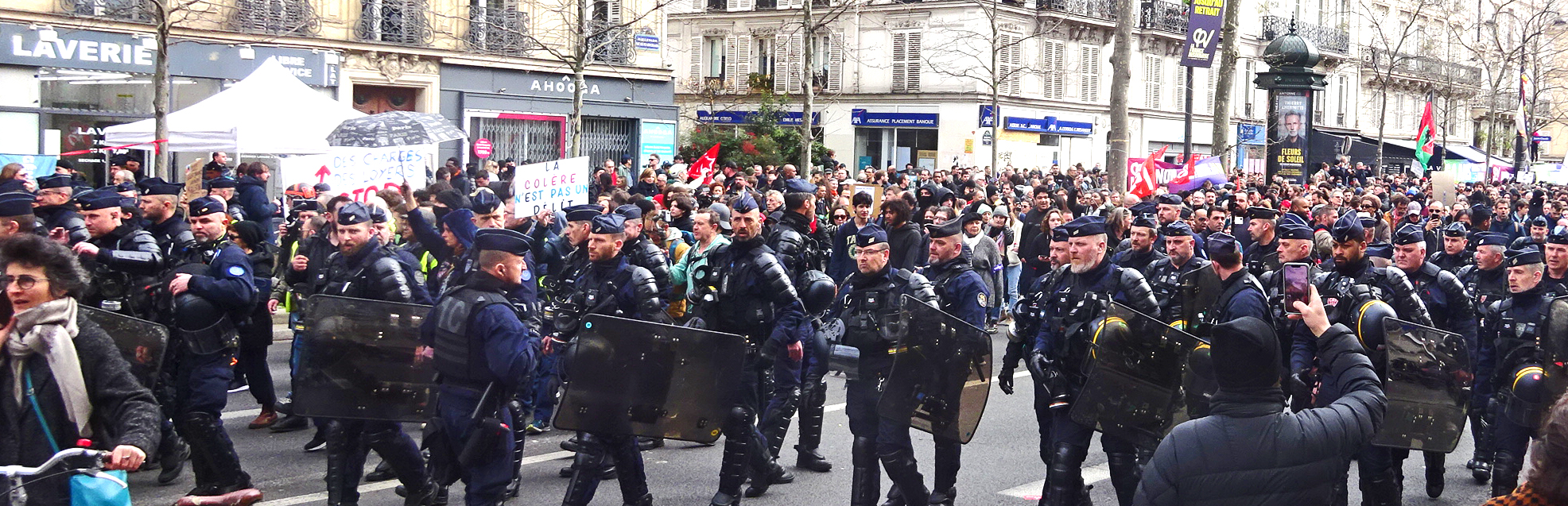
Strength of the police presence in Paris.

In the evening, Interior Minister Darmanin made a statement where he declared that there had been an attempt to kill police officers by some protesters. BBC News and France 24 claim he announced 123 police officers had been injured nationwide, while an independent journalist said he claimed 149 had been injured in Paris alone. In Paris, one officer was "dragged to safety while unconscious, as he and his colleagues came under fire from fireworks and other missiles. The officer appeared to have been hit on the head". In Rouen, a young woman was reported to have lost her thumb after hit by a 'flash ball' grenade used by police to try and disperse protesters – Damien Adam, Renaissance MP for the area, "says it's "clearly unacceptable" and he wants a police inquiry to find out what happened" – and police confirmed two officers were injured after missiles were thrown at them. LFI officials have "complained that six protesters had been hurt by police tear gas and stun grenades and wants to know what orders officers were given".

Darmanin claimed over 80 people had been arrested so far. Shortages of firefighters in the evening meant that local residents themselves had to put out fires themselves; Darmanin claimed 140 fires needed to be put out in Paris, with 50 still burning at the time (approximately 8:30pm GMT).

In the afternoon, union heads Berger and Martinez spoke out. Berger appealed for non-violence, for the "respect of property and people", for "non-violent actions that don't handicap people's daily lives". Martinez claimed Macron was blamed for the actions of protesters and demonstrators, saying he had "thrown a can of petrol on the fire". Hugh Schofield of BBC News said that unions and the left "are calling the day a success, with once again a large turn-out of people showing their rejection of Macron's pension bill".

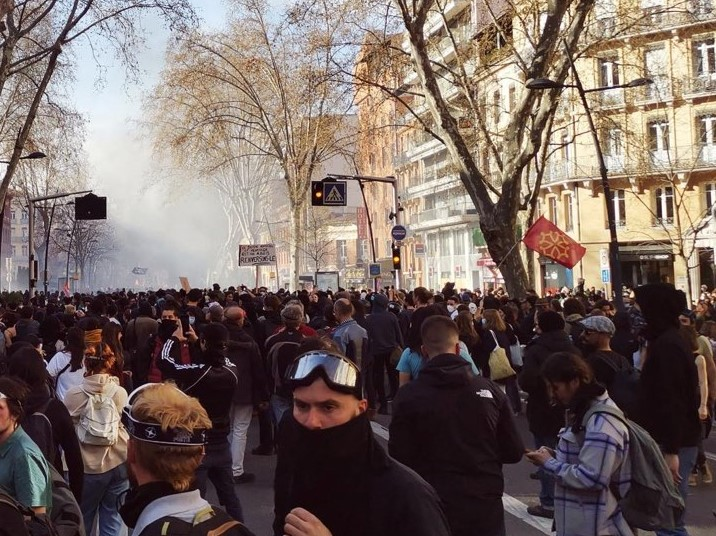
Toulouse (Occitania) on 28 March.

=== 28 March ===
On 28 March, a tenth day of protests was estimated at 740,000 attendees by the French government and 2 million by unions. Prime Minister Borne declined formal mediation, but agreed to talks with eight leading union leaders the following week, when an eleventh day of protest was planned.

=== 6 April ===
The union leaders' meeting with Borne on 5 April ended after about an hour after both sides insisted that the pension reform must respectively be cancelled or remain. Union leaders exiting the meeting called for an eleventh day of protests to go ahead the following day. According to French authorities, between 600,000 and 800,000 demonstrators were expected, with 60,000 to 90,000 in Paris. According to the French Interior Ministry, 111 arrests were made and 154 police officers were injured. Protesters started a fire at Café de la Rotonde, one of Macron's favourite restaurants, and other protesters stormed the office buildings of BlackRock and Natixis Investment Managers.

=== 14 April ===
On 14 April, the Constitutional Council delivered its verdict on the pension bill, declaring it to be compatible with the Constitution. Prior to the ruling being made public, French Prime Minister Élisabeth Borne had said that the proposal was "nearing the end of its democratic process," and said there were "no winners or losers." Macron signed the bill later that same day. Labor Minister Olivier Dussopt said the government is already working hard to implement the changes by 1 September. Before the Constitutional Council's decision, Macron invited labour unions to meet with him. The unions rejected Macron's invitation, noting that he had refused their previous offers of a meeting, and called for mass new protests on 1 May, International Workers Day.

=== 17 April ===
On 17 April, French President Emmanuel Macron vowed to a government action plan in the next 100 days to decrease anger over the pension reform. Macron had also acknowledged the anger over the increasing prices jobs that did not "allow too many French people to live well". Macron also stated that he wanted the Prime Minister, Élisabeth Borne, to take measure on work, law and order, education, and health conditions and issues.

=== 19 April ===
During Emmanuel Macron's tour of France, protesters gathered in Muttersholtz, wearing CGT vests and held unwelcoming signs and banners, including one banner which threatened to cancel the upcoming 2024 Summer Olympics if Macron did not withdraw the pension reform. The protesters, who banged pots and pans in order to be heard, were pushed back by police in numerous locations across the country.

=== 20 April ===
Continuing his tour, Emmanuel Macron was jeered by crowds in eastern France in Sélestat, in Alsace. Locals chanted for Macron to resign and some heckled him. Macron noted that the incidents would not stop him from making visits across France.

=== 1 May ===
After the calling for mass new protests on International Workers' Day, clashes erupted between protesters and security forces on 1 May. French President Emmanuel Macron was greeted with pot-bashing and jeers as he toured the country. During the tour, Macron thanked the French workers to their contributions to the nation, however he did not mention the ongoing protests. Effigies of Macron and Interior Minister Gérald Darmanin were abused or burned across France, including the city of Strasbourg. In Paris, windows were broken at banks and estate agents, projectiles were thrown at law enforcement, including one who was hit with a Molotov cocktail, suffering severe burns to his face and hands. Tear gas was deployed by police officers in the cities of Toulouse and Nantes, and property damage occurred in Nantes, Lyon, and Marseille. That day, 2.3 million people protested according to the protest organizers, while 800,000 protesters were estimated by French authorities. 108 police officers were injured in the clashes, 19 seriously injured in Paris, and 291 protesters were arrested.

=== 2 May ===
After the May Day protests, French trade unions on 2 May announced a new day of nationwide protests against Macron's pension reform, setting the future protests on June 6. The next round marks the 14th wave of protests since the signing of the reform. The government responded that it wanted to "move on" to other issues and stated that it will send invitations to the unions for talks, and that the government would use it to reaffirm their opposition to the pension reform and work on proposals to improve workers' conditions.

=== 3 May ===
On 3 May, France's Constitutional Council rejected a second bid for pension referendum by political opponents. The council issued a statement stating that the proposed referendum failed the legal criteria, which was defined in the constitution, and it also failed to address the required reform regarding social policy. As a result, protests ensued, including some in the financial district of Paris. While the protests continued, Nasser Kanaani, spokesperson for the Iranian Foreign Ministry, called on the French government to refrain from violence against protesters.

=== 8 May ===
While Macron celebrated Victory Day, law enforcement banned gatherings in Paris and Lyon. In Lyon, several streets were closed to traffic, public transportation was disrupted, and some parking was prohibited. Despite the restrictions, protests and bangs of pots and pans followed, in which authorities responded with tear gas being spread. Clashes also erupted at Montluc prison, where Macron paid tribute to a leading resistance figure, Jean Moulin, when protesters attempted to break through a riot police cordon, who were deployed to keep them away from the French president.

=== 19 May ===
Hospital workers protested in front of Carlton Cannes Hotel on 19 May, violating the ban on protests throughout most of the city.

=== 21 May ===
Dozens of protestors gathered in Gannes in the outskirts of Cannes Film Festival on 21 May. Local authorities ordered a ban on protests throughout most of the city.

=== 6 June ===
280,000 protesters marched on 6 June, while strikes forced Orly Airport to cancel one-third of its flights that day. Protesters also stormed the headquarters of the 2024 Summer Olympics in Paris, briefly occupying the headquarters building, however no damage occurred. 11,000 law enforcement officers were deployed, including 4,000 in Paris.

== General impact and analysis ==
=== Concerns over increasing violence ===
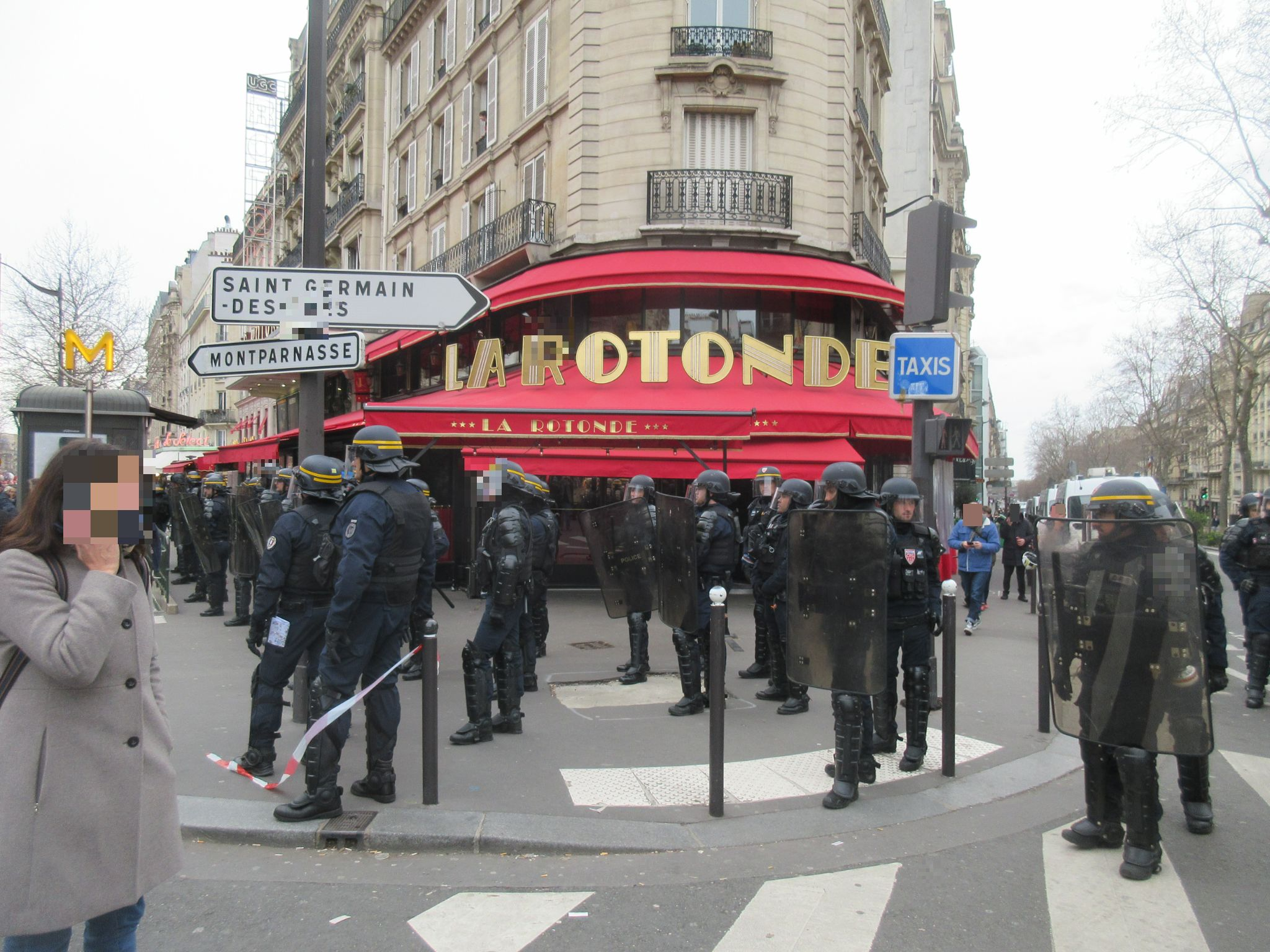
Compagnies Républicaines de Sécurité guarding Café de la Rotonde in Paris on 15 March.

Multiple outlets, including media and unions, have grown concern over the increasing use of violence in the protests, particularly in the days since the government invoked Article 49.3, with comparisons made to the Gilets jaunes (Yellow Vests) protests of the first years of Macron's presidency. On 19 March, The Guardian commented that as "police brace[d] for a week of unpredictable, spontaneous protests in cities and small towns across France, the mood of anger was likened to the start of the gilets jaunes protests". On 20 March, Reuters also voiced that the tone of the protests had deteriorated to, and were "reminiscent" to, that of the Yellow Vest protest in recent days. Euronews, on 21 March, claimed that "government insiders and observers have raised fears that France is again heading for another bout of violent anti-government protests". On 22 March, Reuters outlined that "[p]rotests against the bill have drawn huge crowds in rallies organised by unions since January", of which "[m]ost have been peaceful, but anger has mounted since the government pushed the bill through parliament without a vote last week"; "[t]he past six nights have seen fierce demonstrations across France with bins set ablaze and scuffles with police".

France 24 commented that unions had been "united in coordinating their protests", but that "many expressed fears they could lose control of the protests as more radical demonstrators set the tone". Fabrice Coudour, a leading representative for the 'hard-left' CGT, commented that "tougher action ahead, more serious and further-reaching" was possible that could "escape our collective decision-making". Jean-Marie Pernot, a political scientist specialising in trade unions, said that a lack of "respect [for] any of the channels meant for the expression of dissent, it will find a way to express itself directly". One of the Yellow Vests' "prominent spokesmen", Jerome Rodrigues, spoke to protesters outside the National Assembly after the invoking of Article 49.3 on 17 March, that "the objective was now nothing less than "the defeat" of the president."

Head of the UNSA trade union federation, Lauren Escure, admitted that "when there is this much anger and so many French people on the streets, the more radical elements take the floor", and that it was not something they would want, but was inevitable, and "will be entirely the government's fault," he told AFP. The heads of two 'moderate' unions, Cyril Chabanier of CFTC and Laurent Berger of CFDT, expressed that unions were concerned. Cabanier said that an impression that "it is just violence that pays" was being created, and that "[t]here are some people who are very angry, [and] the anger leads to greater radicalisation and radicalisation unfortunately leads to violence". Berger has been reported as having warned the government that protests could grow more violent if those protesting begin to feel that the Yellow Vests, in France 24's words, "achieved more with violence than established unions with their peaceful, mass demonstrations". Berger told RMC radio, alongside his demand for the reforms to be "withdrawn", that his union "condemn[s] violence", but added "look at the anger. It's very strong, even among our ranks".

On 19 March, The Guardian reported that – alongside the leader of the Republicans' office being vandalised – other MPs from the party were "receiving hundreds of threatening emails a day". Frédérique Meunier told BFMTV that "[i]t's as if tomorrow they want to decapitate us", and that the emails being received "amounted to harassment". The constituency offices of Renaissance MPs – the party from which Macron originates – were also targeted. BBC News's Paris correspondent, Hugh Schofield, on 22 March, said that the protests in recent days had been "spectacular, sometimes, visually" but "not huge in terms of scale" and "mostly .. the work of very committed left-wingers, class-warrior types, who are leading the battle". Natasha Butler of Al Jazeera said the violence in recent days was "sporadic".

=== Waste collection strike ===
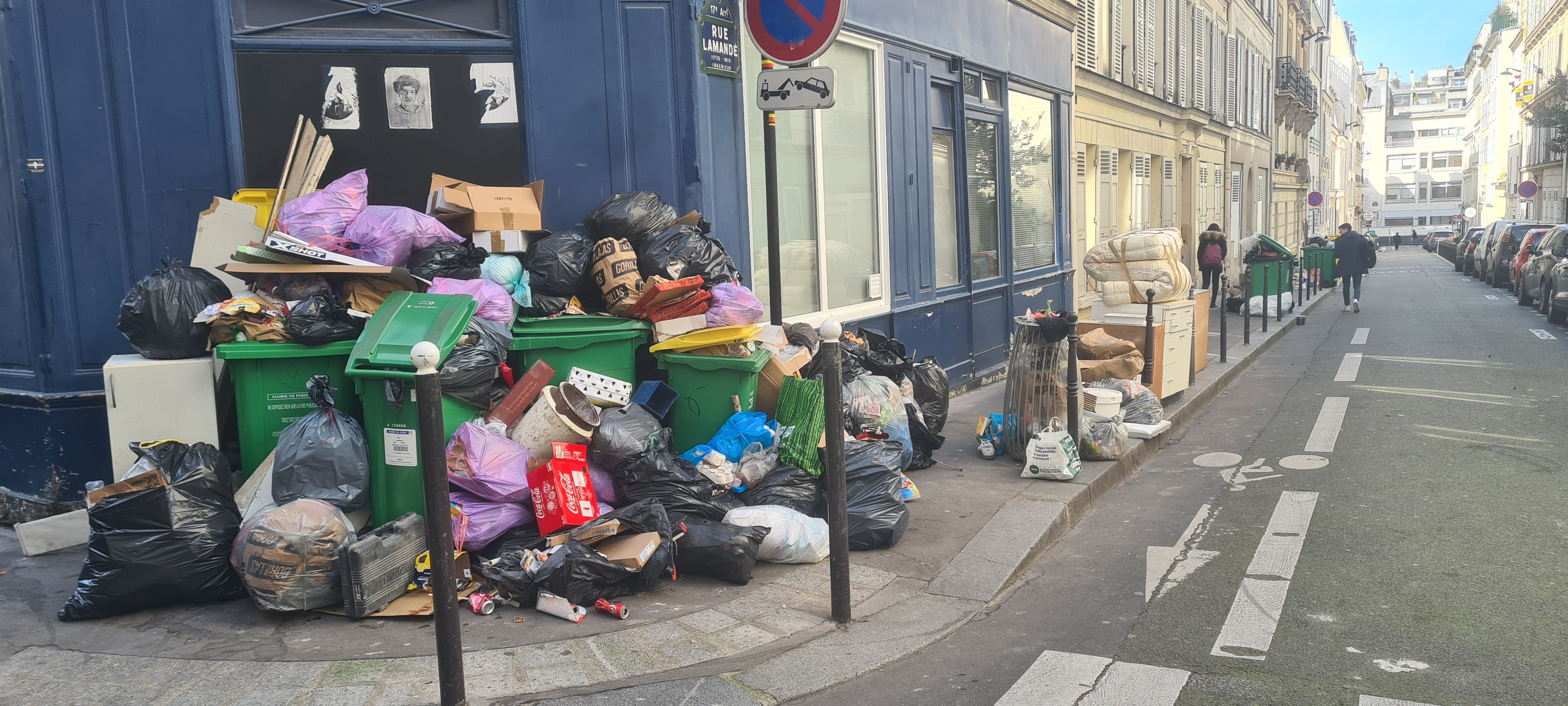
Rubbish piled up on a street corner in Paris on 16 March.

A strike by waste collectors began on 6 March, which included a blockade of the city's incinerators. The proposed pension reforms would raise their retirement age from 57 to 59. Originally set to last nine days, it was extended by another five on 15 March. As of 15 March, "bin lorries [were] grounded at depots and at least three waste incinerators in the Paris area [were] at a standstill".

The impact of the waste workers' strike has left thousands of tonnes of rubbish uncollected on the streets of Paris. On 17 March, it was estimated the amount was 10,000 tonnes, up from 7,600 earlier in the week. Interior Minister Gérald Darmanin said that "strikers were being forced back under emergency powers designed to safeguard essential services", and from the morning of 17 March told RTL radio that "requisitioning is working and bins are being emptied", although this was disputed by an aide of Paris mayor Anne Hidalgo. Hidalgo has maintained her support for the strikers despite efforts by government to break it, with the deputy mayor in charge of waste, Colombe Brossel, commenting that "any demand to force strikers back to work would be "an attack on the constitutional right to strike"."

Waste collection in Paris is split around half-and-half between municipal waste workers and private companies, who remained in operation with some taking contracts to operate in areas worst hit by the strike action; such as the ninth district, whose mayor, Delphine Burkli, suggested "calling in the army to clear the streets."

Waste collection strikes also affected Antibes, Rennes, and Le Havre.

On 18 March, the mayor of Paris' 12th district, Emmanuelle Pierre-Marie, said that the priority was food waste in the streets – AP describing the "uncollected garbage" as having "become a visual and olfactory symbol of the actions to defeat the president's pension reform plan" – "because it is what brings pests to the surface" and that they "are extremely sensitive to the situation. As soon as we have a dumpster truck available, we give priority to the places most concerned, like food markets." It was claimed that police had "requisitioned garbage workers to clean up some neighborhoods".

As of 19 March, Philippe Martinez from CGT had "urged" Paris collection workers to continue their now-two-week-long strike.

The strike was suspended on 29 March due to declining participation, partly due to requisitions order by the Paris police.

=== Actions of police (violent behaviour; outcome of arrests) ===
Euronews reported that, of the 292 arrested after the protests on 16 March only nine were "charged with actual offences". Additionally, they have reported that many who just happened to be passing by were taken into custody, some without a "clear reason why", with French media reporting two Austrian children on a school trip were taken into custody after the 16 March protests, only released following intervention by the Austrian Embassy.

On 17 March, 60 people were taken into custody, with 34 cases closed, 21 with another result (such as a caution or warning), with just five ending up at trial. Coline Bouillon, a lawyer who represented some demonstrators, told Euronews that a large group of people who had been at a conference were "rounded up", police justifying the arrests for their "participation in a group with a view to preparing violence", or "concealing their faces"; they were remanded in custody for one to two days; she, among a group of lawyers, intend to "file a collective complaint against the police for "arbitrary detention" and "obstruction of the freedom to demonstrate"."

Such "arbitrary police custody", "mass-arrest", tactics have been accused – by politicians, judges and lawyers alike – of being utilised "simply to frustrate the protest movement", it being perceived, through precedent (such as in the gilet jaunes protests), as a "repression of the social movement". This view was shared by a judges' union, the Syndicat de la Magistrature (SM), with Raphaël Kempf, a French lawyer in judiciary repression methods, commenting that it was the first time the government had used "criminal law to dissuade demonstrators from demonstrating and exercising their freedom," said Raphaël Kempf, a French lawyer specialising in judiciary repression methods". Fabien Jobard, research director at France's National Scientific Research Centre CNRS, said that a "judicialisation of policing" has taken place over the past 15 years, with specific reference to a 2010 law that created the offence of "participation in a group with a view to committing violence or damage"; its original remit of mitigating against 'gang violence' and at sporting venues has been expanded to protests and demonstrations.

According to Le Monde critics are expressing concerns over the "violent confrontations and the systematic use of arrests" at rallies.

On 20 March, on television, police were seen momentarily firing tear gas and rushing at demonstrators in several cities, with special motorbike officers thrusting through protesters, which made Clément Voule, the UN Special Rapporteur on Freedom of Association, respond on Twitter by stating that officers should avoid using disproportionate force.

On 21 March, an Interior Ministry spokesperson commented that "there are no unjustified arrests", and people are questioned for "offences which, in our eyes, are constituted" and "48 hours (of police custody) to try to process the offence is short". AFP was told by a senior police source that instructions have not been given to conduct mass arrests, adding "when high-risk profiles are arrested, they are no longer agitating others"; another officer added that with such a high number of arrests, the "manoeuvre is risky", as they "expose the workforce, monopolise officers" and "risk radicalising the demonstrators".

On 21 March, The Guardian reported that the "police watchdog is investigating allegations that four young women in Nantes were sexually assaulted during police controls at a demonstration last week". On 23 March, British journalist Lewis Goodall, covering the demonstrations in Paris, reported that police were "on pretty brutal form" – stating a member of his team had been targeted by police despite asserting they were press – and were also throwing their stun grenades with "abandon". During the protests of the 23 March, hundreds of officers were injured across France. However, as BBC News wrote, protesters were also injured by police stun grenades, and the Council of Europe declared that there was no justification for "excessive force" by authorities.

=== Political ramifications ===
Macron's proposal to raise the retirement age from 62 to 64 has been compared to former President Nicolas Sarkozy's 2010 reform that raised the retirement age from 60 to 62, which also led to massive strikes and protests across France. Public opinion polling analysis has shown that Sarkozy's push for reform played a role in driving voters to both the Socialist Party and the far-right National Front in the 2012 presidential election.

One author of a paper in academic journal West European Politics tweeted a screenshot of the results of a study that showed executive approval has historically fallen after no-confidence votes, and linked it to what the impact of invoking Article 49.3 could be. The Guardian touched on political dissatisfaction, comparing the protests to that of the gilet jaunes, which "were initially against fuel tax rises but evolved to encompass a wider lack of trust in the political system". Antoine Bristielle, from the Fondation Jean-Jaures think tank, opined that the invoking of Article 49.3 could be "perceived as a symbol of brutality" and could "erode support both for the government and democratic institutions".

==== Hypothetical alternatives ====
Many theorised that in the aftermath of the pension reforms controversy, Macron would fire Prime Minister Borne, such as "to try and reset his image", while prominent figures of opposition parties suggested using a referendum, and put the decision to implement the reforms to voters.

Prior to the no-confidence votes (which failed and thus the pension reforms entered into law), France 24 outlined the alternatives. They contended that the votes were likely to fail, even the one tabled by the centrist group LIOT which was most likely to attract transpartisan support – unless enough members of the Republicans broke ranks and voted in favour (which did not happen) – and the potential consequence of the National Assembly being dissolved and fresh elections being triggered (which Macron has at his disposal regardless) was also unlikely. Failure of the no-confidence votes leaves attempts to hold a referendum as one other option, known as a référendum d'initiative partagée (a shared-initiative referendum, or RIP); it requires the support of one-fifth of both the National Assembly and Senate, as well as the signatures of a tenth of the electorate, which need to be collected within nine months. However, it was pointed out that the triggering of an 'RIP' would need to have been done "before the enactment of the law"; yet, according to Stéphane Peu, deputy of the Communist Party Deputy, NUPES has had the support of the necessary 185 National Assembly members since 14 March, two days before the invoking of Article 49.3; he said his bill would include language that stated "the retirement age cannot exceed 62". The Times, on 19 March, wrote that the process being started would lead to the pension reforms being unable to be introduced until the referendum took place, "thwarting Macron's plans to start bringing in the changes from September and casting a shadow over the government's other work."

Furthermore, it was announced that members of NUPES would appeal to the Constitutional Council; a deputy of the LIOT group said on 14 March that had the bill passed by vote in the National Assembly, "several appeals" would have been made. France 24 said that NUPES would "argue that the reform, which was inserted into the social security budget, is a legislative rider, since the text addresses more than just finances", and that "[l]eft-wing deputies intend to rely on the opinion of France's Conseil d'État (Council of State), which had warned the government of a risk that certain measures in its pension reform plan, as well as the plan's lack of clear calculations, were unconstitutional".

On 21 March, Macron declared he would not dissolve the National Assembly or call a referendum on the reforms.

=== Postponement of Charles III's state visit ===
On 3 March, it was announced that King Charles III and Queen Camilla, would visit France between 26 and 29 March. However, in the week leading up to the scheduled visit, many news organizations began to report that the King's visit could be disrupted by the ongoing protests.

The optics for the trip were criticised. The author of a biography of the late Queen Elizabeth II, Stephen Clarke, said it was "very bad timing", and that while the people of France would "normally ... welcome a British king", "in this moment, people protesting are on high alert for any sign of privilege and wealth"; Associated Press (AP) commented that "what was meant to be a show of bonhomie and friendship ... instead ... is being seen as an unnecessary display of hereditary privilege". He added that the King and Queen Consort's plans to attend a "lavish dinner at the former royal residence, the Versailles Palace", "does not look good", and "seems very 1789". Associated Press clarified that the "lavish Versailles, once the dazzling center of royal Europe, is a potent symbol of social inequalities and excess". The Daily Telegraph reported that the banquet, intended to take place on 27 March, could be cancelled or moved.

EELV MP Sandrine Rousseau called for the trip to be cancelled, asking if "the priority [is] really to receive Charles III at Versailles? Something is taking place within French society... the priority is to go and talk to society which is rising up."

On 23 March, Associated Press reported how the CGT's members at Mobilier National (the institution in charge of providing flags, red carpets and furniture for public buildings) "would not help prepare a Sunday reception for the king upon his arrival in Paris"; in response, the Élysée Palace said "non-striking workers would set up the necessary accoutrements for the trip". On 23 March, unions called for their tenth day of nationwide action for 28 March, coinciding with the last full day of the state visit.

On 24 March, at the request of the French Government, the state visit was postponed. Macron reportedly decided it would no longer be feasible or appropriate for the visit to take place once unions announced the tenth day of national walkouts on the 28 March, during the state visit. Éric Ciotti, leader of the Republicans said the cancellation brought "shame on our country", while Mélenchon was of an opposing mood, "delighted" that the "meeting of kings at Versailles" had been broken up, and that "the English knew that France's interior minister was pathetic on security". The visit was rescheduled for some time in the summer, "when things calm down again".

== International reactions ==
Iran condemned what it called “France's repression of protests.” Iranian Foreign Minister Hossein Amir-Abdollahian said "We call on the French government to respect human rights" and further added "instead of creating chaos in other countries, listen to the voice of your people and avoid violence against them." The comments were widely condemned as hypocritical by the government of France.

France's Human Rights League has accused the authorities of disproportionate and dangerous use of public force, undermining citizens' right to protest. The league's president said "The authoritarian shift of the French state, the brutalisation of social relations through its police, violence of all kinds and impunity are a major scandal."

Rights groups and independent bodies, including the National Consultative Commission on Human Rights, have criticized French police for resorting to excessive force and for making preventative arrests that could amount to arbitrary deprivation of liberty. The French Defender of Rights noted on March 21 that "this practice may induce a risk of disproportionately resorting to custodial measures and fostering tensions." Human Rights Watch told AFP it was very concerned about "what appears to be abusive police practices."

According to Reporters Without Borders, several "clearly identifiable" journalists were assaulted by security forces during the demonstrations.

On 20 March, the United Nations Special Rapporteur on Freedom of Association warned French authorities that “peaceful demonstrations are a fundamental right that the authorities must guarantee and protect. Law enforcement officers must facilitate them and avoid excessive use of force.”

The Council of Europe condemned France's crackdown on protests and warned that sporadic acts of violence could not justify "excessive use of force by agents of the state."

White House National Security Council spokesman John Kirby stated "We support the right of people to protest and to express their opinions" when asked about the situation in France.

Dimitris Koutsoumpas, the General Secretary of the Communist Party of Greece, attended a rally in Paris on 23 March; in a statement from Bastille Square, expressing his solidarity with the "struggle of the French people ... against anti-labor policies, against the anti-popular choices" utilised by both the French and the Greek governments in order to ensure the working people "finally win" and "pave the way for their own interests and not the interests and profits of the few." The International Anthem was played over loudspeakers, with the railway workers and trade unionists being spoken to offering him a "Friends of the Paris Commune" handkerchief.

== See also ==
- Nahel Merzouk protests
- 1995 strikes in France
- 2010 French pension reform strikes
- 2019–2020 French pension reform strike
- May 68
- 2022 French protests
- 2024 French protests against the far-right
- Protests against Emmanuel Macron
- Yellow vests protests
