= CATC =

CATC may refer to:

- Carnitine O-acetyltransferase, an enzyme
- Catapult C, an electronic design automation product
- CATC Design School, in Australia
- Central Arkansas Telephone Cooperative
- Civil Aviation Technology College, Iran
- Civil Aviation Training Center, Iran
- College of Air Traffic Control, in the United Kingdom
- Combined Arms Training Centre, of the Australian Army
- Confédération africaine des travailleurs croyants (disambiguation), various trade unions in Africa
