= Confédération dahoméenne des travailleurs croyants =

CDTC
- Confédération dahoméenne des travailleurs croyants
- Headquarters: Bourse du Travail, Cotonou
- Location: Benin
- Members: 1,000 (1966 est.)
- Affiliations: International Federation of Christian Trade Unions, UPTC, ATUC

Confédération dahoméenne des travailleurs croyants ('Dahomeyan Confederation of Believing Workers, abbreviated CDTC) was a national trade union centre in the Republic of Dahomey (now known as Benin). CDTC emerged from the Dahomeyan branch of Confédération africaine des travailleurs croyants, which had been formed by the West African branches of the French trade union centre CFTC.

CDTC was affiliated to the International Federation of Christian Trade Unions, Union panafricaine des travailleurs croyants and the African Trade Union Confederation.

CDTC was banned through the government decree 494 P.R./M.A.I.S.D. on November 17, 1962 as the Dahomeyan government opted for a one-party system. The organization was, however, revived. As of 1966, the organization was estimated to have membership of around 1,000.

== See also ==
- Confédération africaine des travailleurs croyants de l'A.E.F
