= Buriram =

- City
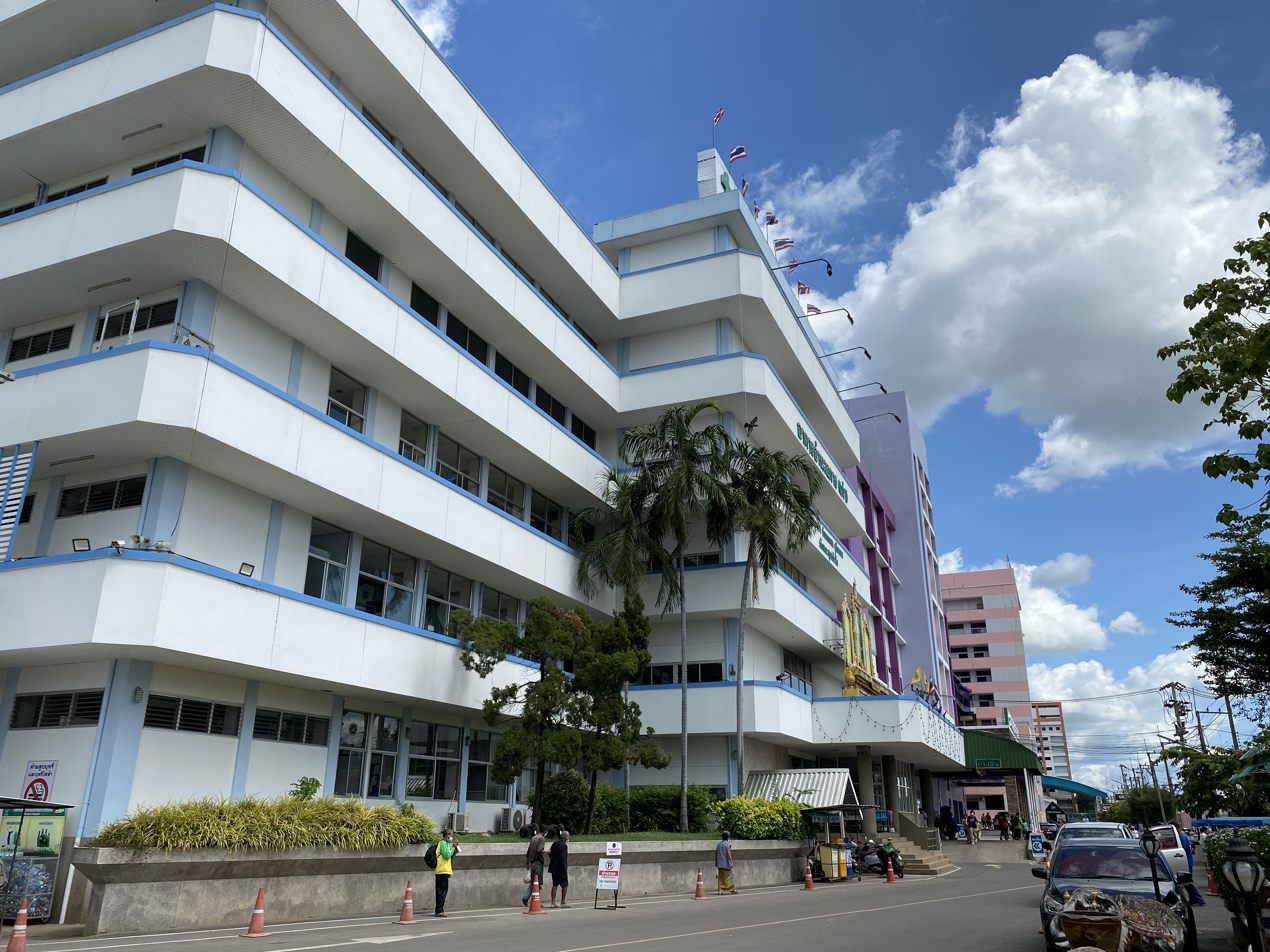
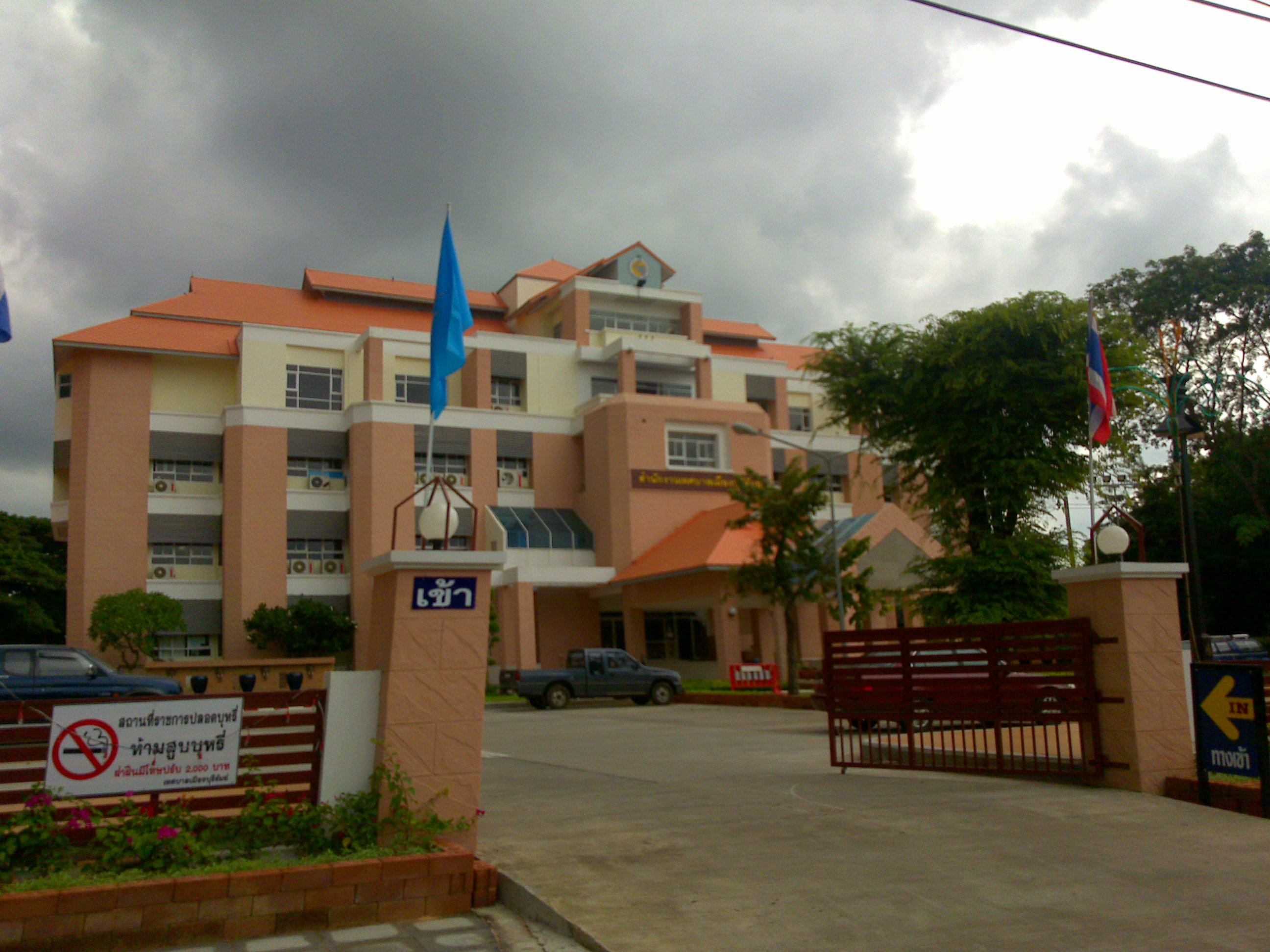
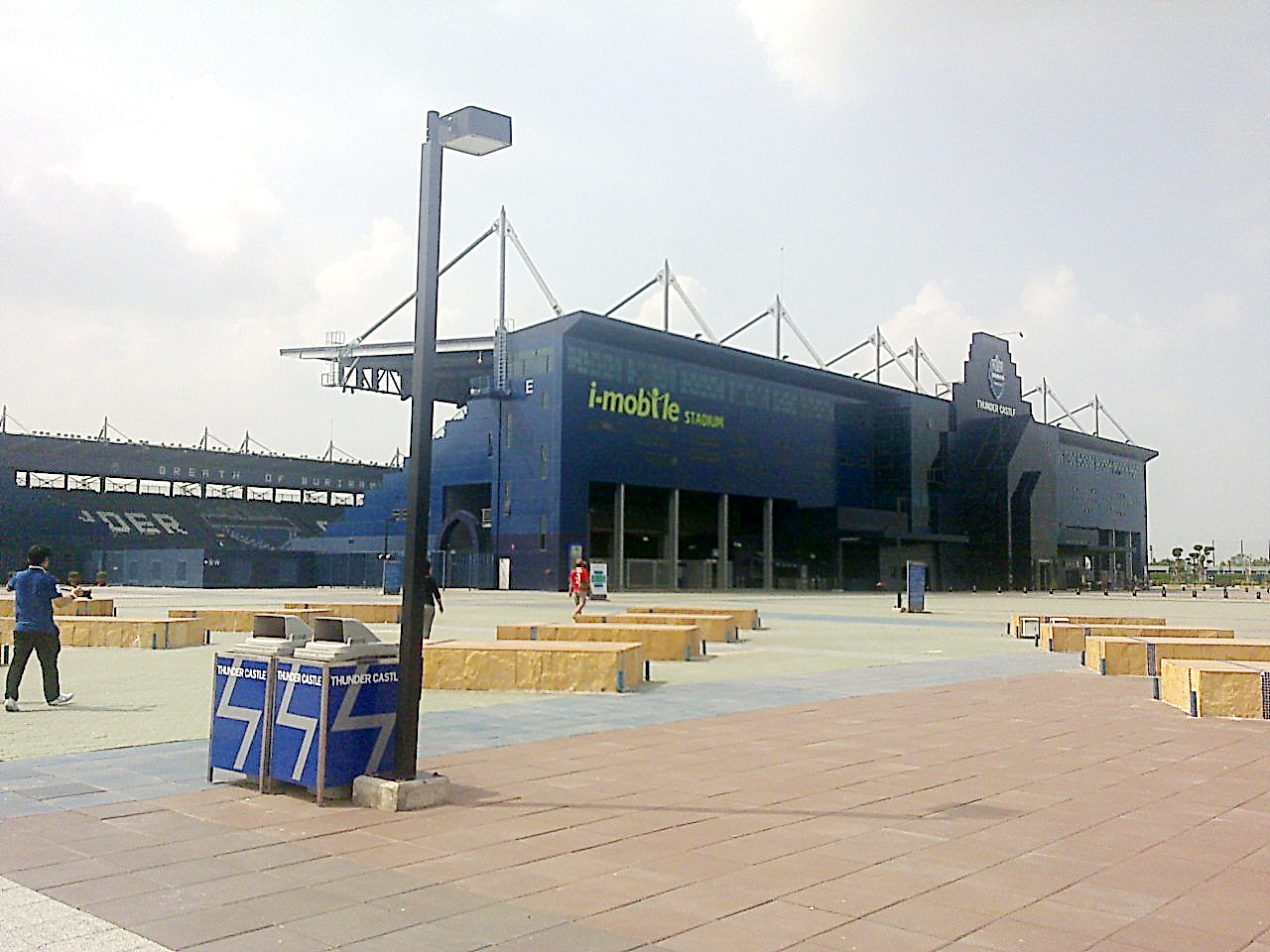
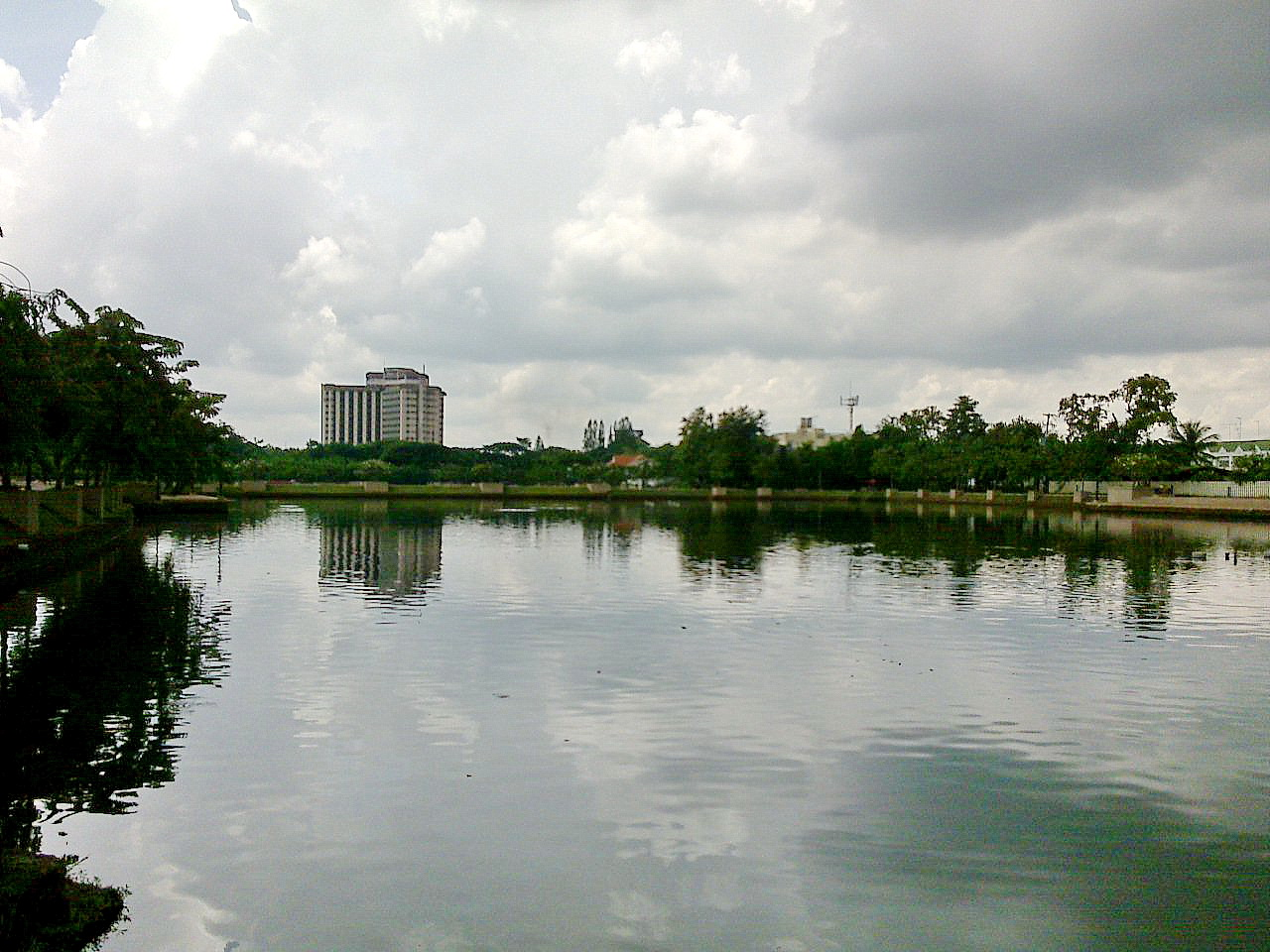
- (From top, left to right): Buriram Hospital, Municipality Office, Chang Arena, and the moat with defunct Saeng Rung Hotel

- Seal

- Location in Thailand
- Coordinates: 14°59′39″N 103°06′08″E
- Country: Thailand
- Province: Buriram
- District: Buriram
- Town municipality: 14 February 1936
- City municipality: 31 October 2024
- Named for: บุรี buri – "Town, City" รัมย์ ram – "Happiness" lit. 'Town of Happiness'

Government
  - Type: City municipality
  - Mayor: Anuchit Luangchaisri (since January 2025)

Area
  - Total: 29.13 sq mi (75.44 km^{2})
- Elevation: 535 ft (163 m)

Population (2023)
  - Total: 23,364
- Time zone: UTC+7 (ICT)
- Postal code: 31000
- Area code: 044
- Airport: IATA: BFV – ICAO: VTUO
- Website: www.buriramcity.go.th

Buriram (Thai: บุรีรัมย์, RTGS: Buri Ram, pronounced [bū.rīː rām]; Northern Khmer: มฺืงแปะ) is a city municipality (thesaban nakhon) in Thailand, capital of Buriram Province, about 300 km (190 mi) northeast of Bangkok. incorporating Nai Mueang and Isan Subdistricts and parts Samet Subdistricts of Mueang Buriram District. In 2023 it had a population of 23,364.

== History ==
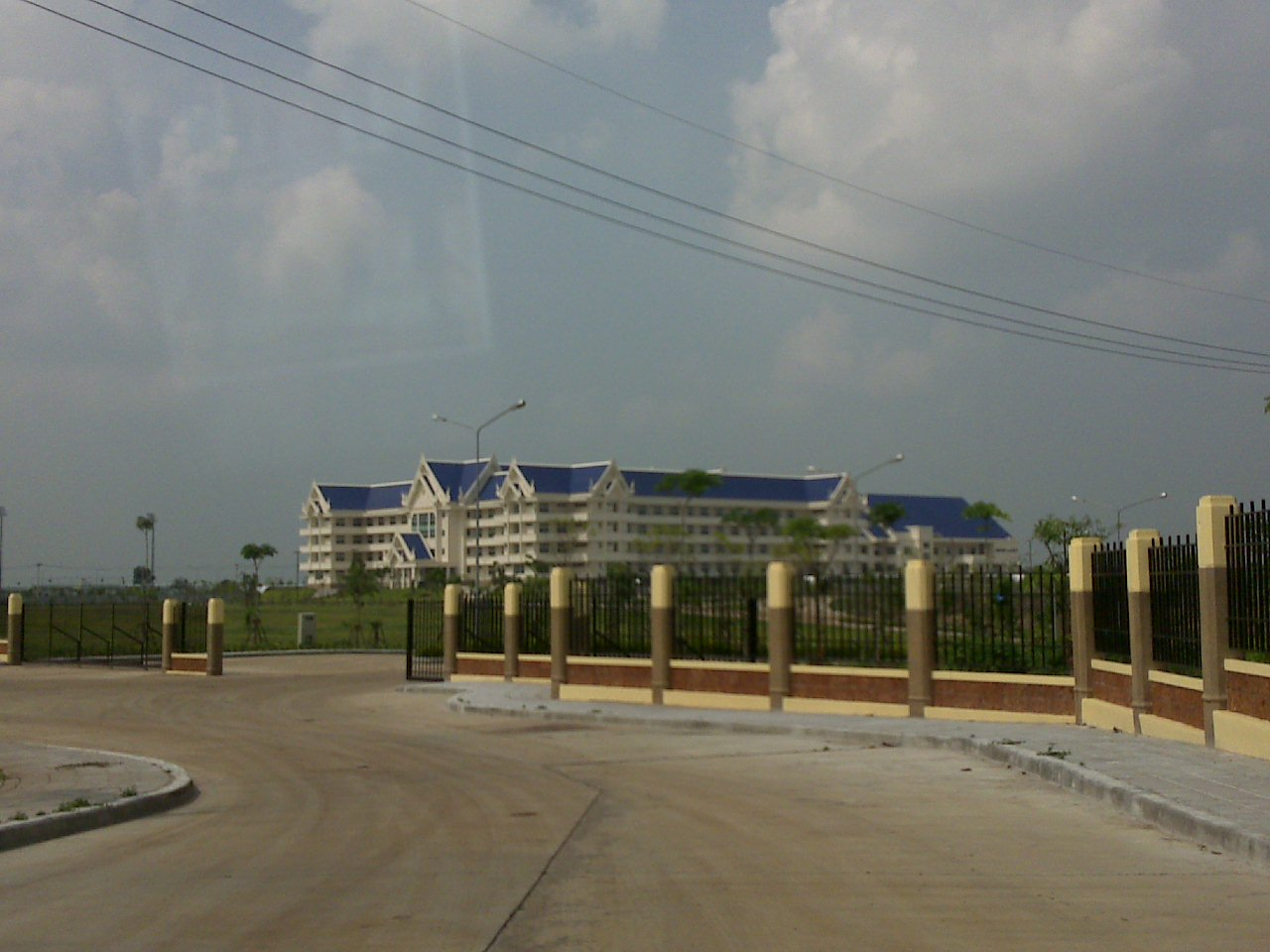
Buriram Civic Center

Almost a thousand years ago, the present-day Buriram was part of the Khmer Empire. Ruins from that time attest to its destruction. The most significant of them is on an extinct volcano and is protected in the Phanom Rung Historical Park. According to inscriptions found, Buriram's ruler recognized the hegemony of the Khmer Empire's emperor. Before the ascent of Bangkok, little was known about Buriram. In the early Bangkok Period, in the early-19th century, the town originally called Muang Pae was renamed Buriram. After administrative reforms in the late 19th century, Buriram was incorporated into Siam as a province.

== Administration divisions ==
There are 3 subdistricts and 40 chumchons (villages) (Thai: ชุมชน) in Buriram City Municipality.

Nai Mueang Subdistricts

Rank	English name	Thai Name
1	Chum Het	ชุมชนชุมเห็ด
2	Lang Sathani Rotfai	ชุมชนหลังสถานีรถไฟ
3	Nah Sathani Rotfai	ชุมชนหน้าสถานีรถไฟ
4	Prapa Kao	ชุมชนประปาเก่า
5	Bu Lamduan Nuea	ชุมชนบุลำดวนเหนือ
6	Bu Lamduan Tai	ชุมชนบุลำดวนใต้
7	Lang Rajabhat	ชุมชนหลังราชภัฏ
8	Ton Sak	ชุมชนต้นสัก
9	Lak Mueang	ชุมชนหลักเมือง
10	Saphan Yao	ชุมชนสะพานยาว
11	Khok Klang	ชุมชนโคกกลาง
12	Lalom	ชุมชนละลม
13	Talat Bokhoso	ชุมชนตลาด บ.ข.ส.
14	Lang San	ชุมชนหลังศาล
15	Thetsaban	ชุมชนเทศบาล
16	Talat Sot	ชุมชนตลาดสด
17	Wat Isan	ชุมชนวัดอิสาณ
18	Nong Prue	ชุมชนหนองปรือ

Isan Subdistricts

Rank	English name	Thai Name
1	Khok Wat	ชุมชนโคกวัด
2	Khok Yai	ชุมชนโคกใหญ่
3	Khok Hua Chang	ชุมชนโคกหัวช้าง
4	Thai Charoen	ชุมชนไทยเจริญ
5	Nong Phrong	ชุมชนหนองโพรง
6	Khok Sa-At	ชุมชนโคกสะอาด
7	Huai	ชุมชนห้วย
8	Nong Paep	ชุมชนหนองแปบ
9	Yang Noi	ชุมชนยางน้อย
10	Hua Ling	ชุมชนหัวลิง
11	Pho Si Suk	ชุมชนโพธิ์ศรีสุข
12	Phai Noi	ชุมชนไผ่น้อย
13	Khok Khun Saman	ชุมชนโคกขุนสมาน
14	Suan Kaur	ชุมชนสวนครัว
15	Silachai	ชุมชนศิลาชัย
16	Khok Makok	ชุมชนโคกมะกอก
17	Hin Lat	ชุมชนหินลาด
18	Sap Somboon	ชุมชนทรัพย์สมบูรณ์

Samet Subdistricts (parts)

Rank	English name	Thai Name
1	Moo 9, Ban Khok Yai	หมู่ที่ 9 บ้านโคกใหญ่
2	Moo 11, Ban Khok Khao	หมู่ที่ 11 บ้านโคกเขา
3	Moo 13, Ban Khao Kradong	หมู่ที่ 13 บ้านเขากระโดง
4	Moo 16, Ban Sila Thong	หมู่ที่ 16 บ้านศิลาทอง

== Geography ==
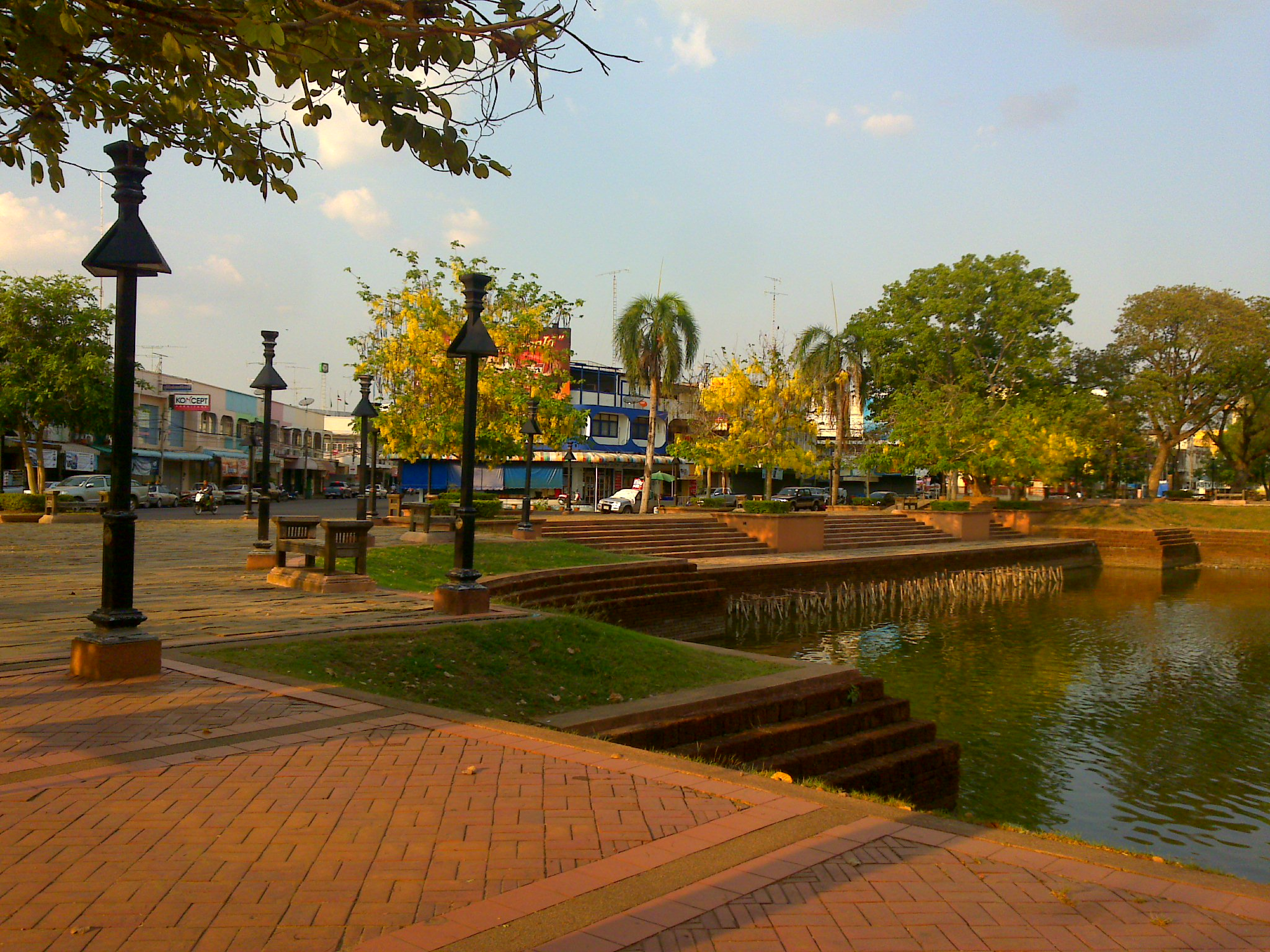
Romburi Park (Thai: สวนรมย์บุรี)

Buriram is in the centre of Buriram Province. Buriram has no significant waterways. It has a creek, Huai Chorakhe Mak, the Buriram moat (or Khlong Lalom), Nong Prue, and Huai Chorakhe Mak and Huai Talat reservoirs.

== Infrastructure ==
=== Communications ===
Buriram has a post office, TOT, the national telecom company, a CAT office and two radio stations: Radio Thailand AM and Radio Thailand FM.

=== Electricity ===
All of the houses in Buriram area (6,097 in total) have access to electricity. The Buriram Provincial Electricity Authority (Buriram PEA) is the main supplier.

=== Water supply ===
There are 6,097 houses which use municipal water in Buriram. Total consumption is 18,000-19,000 cubic meters a day. Huai Chorakhe Reservoir is the source of Buriram's water. Huai Talat Reservoir is the reserve water supply.

=== Health ===
The main hospital in Buriram is Buriram Hospital, operated by the Ministry of Public Health.

== Climate ==
Climate data for Buriram (1989–2018)
Month	Jan	Feb	Mar	Apr	May	Jun	Jul	Aug	Sep	Oct	Nov	Dec	Year
Mean daily maximum °C (°F)	31.4 (88.5)	33.8 (92.8)	35.7 (96.3)	36.5 (97.7)	35.1 (95.2)	34.4 (93.9)	33.6 (92.5)	33.2 (91.8)	32.2 (90.0)	31.3 (88.3)	30.9 (87.6)	30.2 (86.4)	33.2 (91.8)
Daily mean °C (°F)	24.2 (75.6)	26.4 (79.5)	28.6 (83.5)	29.5 (85.1)	28.9 (84.0)	28.7 (83.7)	28.2 (82.8)	27.9 (82.2)	27.3 (81.1)	26.6 (79.9)	25.4 (77.7)	23.8 (74.8)	27.1 (80.8)
Mean daily minimum °C (°F)	18.1 (64.6)	20.0 (68.0)	22.8 (73.0)	24.2 (75.6)	24.6 (76.3)	24.7 (76.5)	24.4 (75.9)	24.3 (75.7)	23.9 (75.0)	23.1 (73.6)	20.8 (69.4)	18.4 (65.1)	22.4 (72.4)
Average precipitation mm (inches)	5.2 (0.20)	18.7 (0.74)	48.9 (1.93)	86.3 (3.40)	171.2 (6.74)	125.8 (4.95)	146.4 (5.76)	193.1 (7.60)	249.4 (9.82)	131.3 (5.17)	32.0 (1.26)	3.9 (0.15)	1,212.2 (47.72)
Average precipitation days	1.4	2.6	5.2	8.6	15.2	14.4	16.9	16.9	18.7	11.2	3.9	1.2	116.2
Average relative humidity (%)	70	66	67	70	77	77	78	80	84	83	76	72	75
Source: Soil Resources Survey and Research Division

== Economy ==
The bulk of the local economy is agricultural and the tourist industry that is a big feature in much of the rest of the country has yet to make a significant impact. Key agricultural crops include rice and cassava. The main languages spoken in Buriram are central Thai, Lao, and Khmer.

== Sports ==
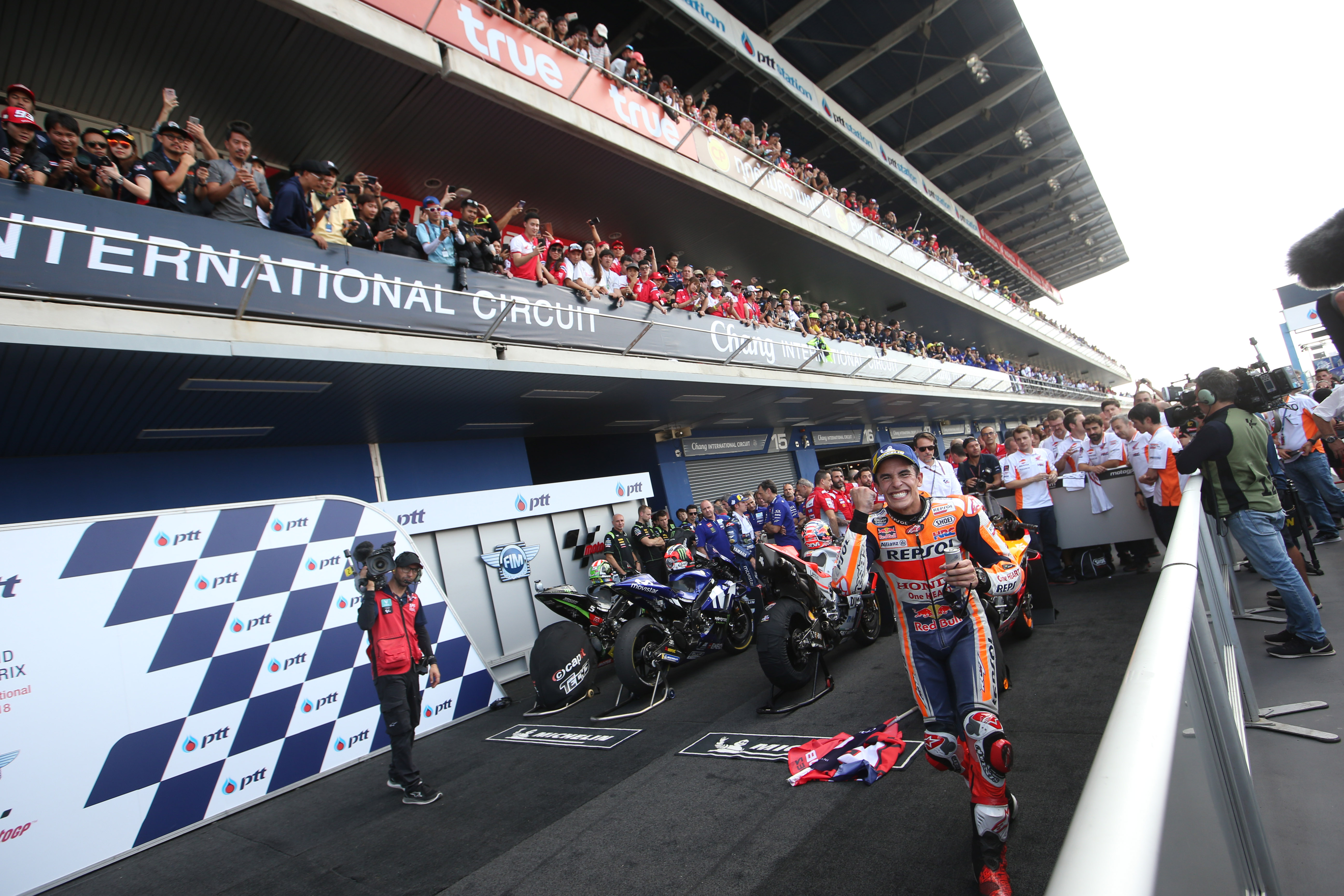
Marc Márquez at Chang International Circuit

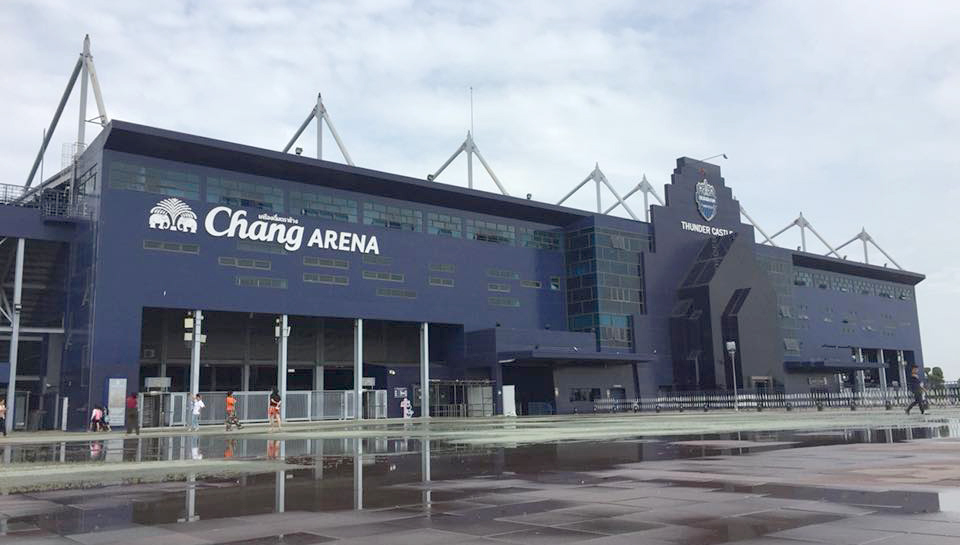
Chang Arena the largest club-owned football stadium in Thailand of Buriram United

Buriram has a football club, Buriram United F.C., which plays at Chang Arena.

The construction of the Chang International Circuit started in March 2013 and opened on 4 October 2014. The track is an FIA Grade I certified circuit, suitable for Formula One racing, and hosted a Japanese Super GT round in 2014. From 2018 to 2019 and 2022 onwards, the circuit hosts the MotoGP Thailand motorcycle Grand Prix. It also hosts rounds of the World Superbike Championship (WSBK). Other racetracks are being planned, such as a motocross circuit. The Buriram Marathon, a silver label class event, is held in January every year. Over 25,000 participants are expected in 2023.

In 2013, Newin Chidchob, developer of the Buriram's new CIC F1 racetrack, has said that, "Buriram doesn't have the sea like Pattaya, doesn't have mountains like Chiang Mai, so we will make Buriram the city of sports."

== Transport ==
=== Airports ===
Buriram Airport is the only airport in Buriram Province. Thai AirAsia serves Buriram from Don Mueang International Airport (DMK).

=== Highways ===
Highways 218, 219, 226, and 2074 pass through Buriram.

=== Intercity transit ===
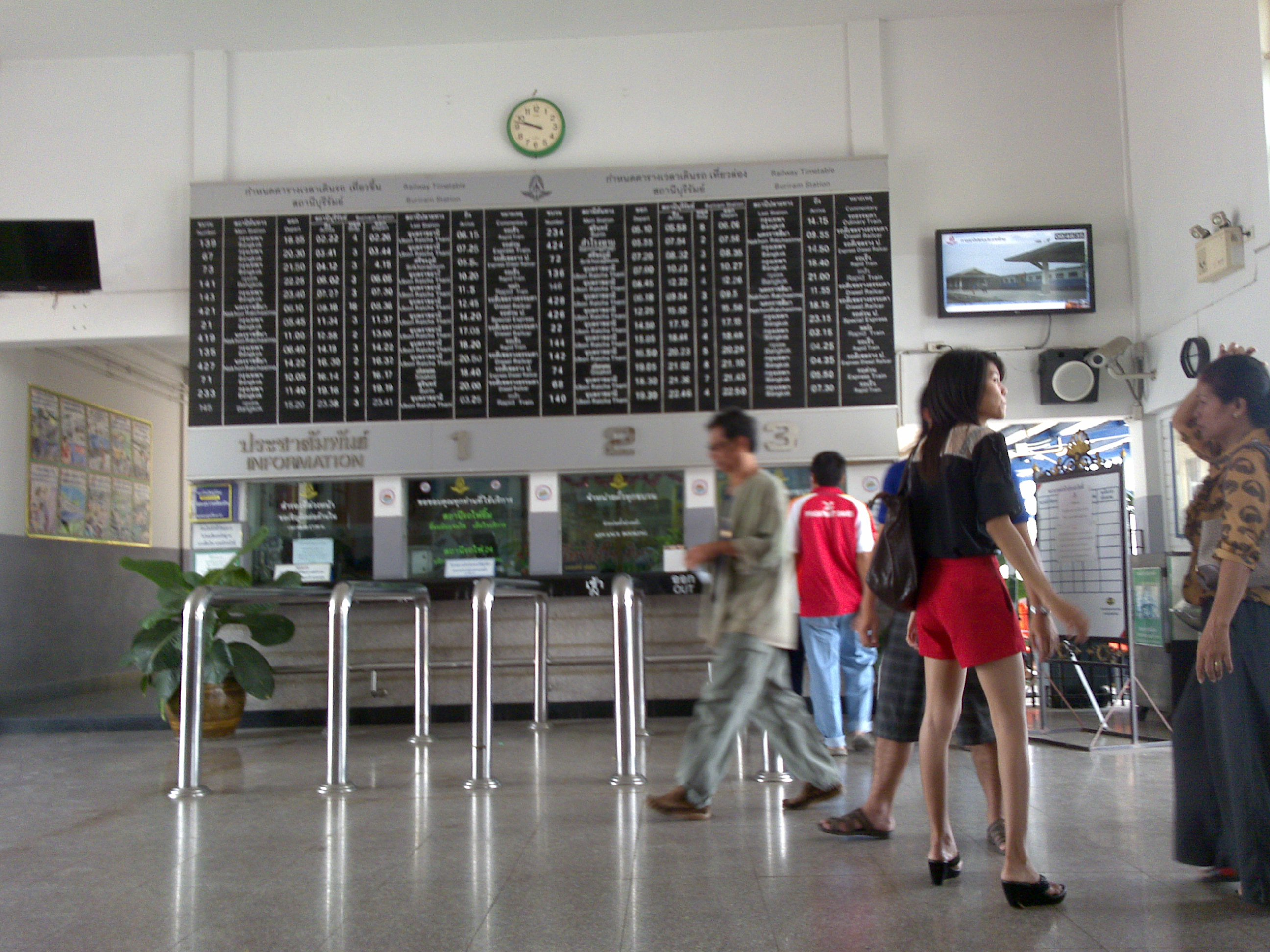
Station hall in Buriram Railway Station

The State Railway of Thailand (SRT), the national rail system, provides service from the Buriram Railway Station. Buriram is on the northeastern railway line.

The national bus company, The Transport Co., Ltd., operates a bus depot at Buriram Bus Station. Nakhonchai Air has its bus terminal adjacent to the bus station.

== Demography ==
As of 30 April 2010.

- Male 13,555
- Female 14,620

Total population of 28,283 and 6,097 family units.

=== Education ===
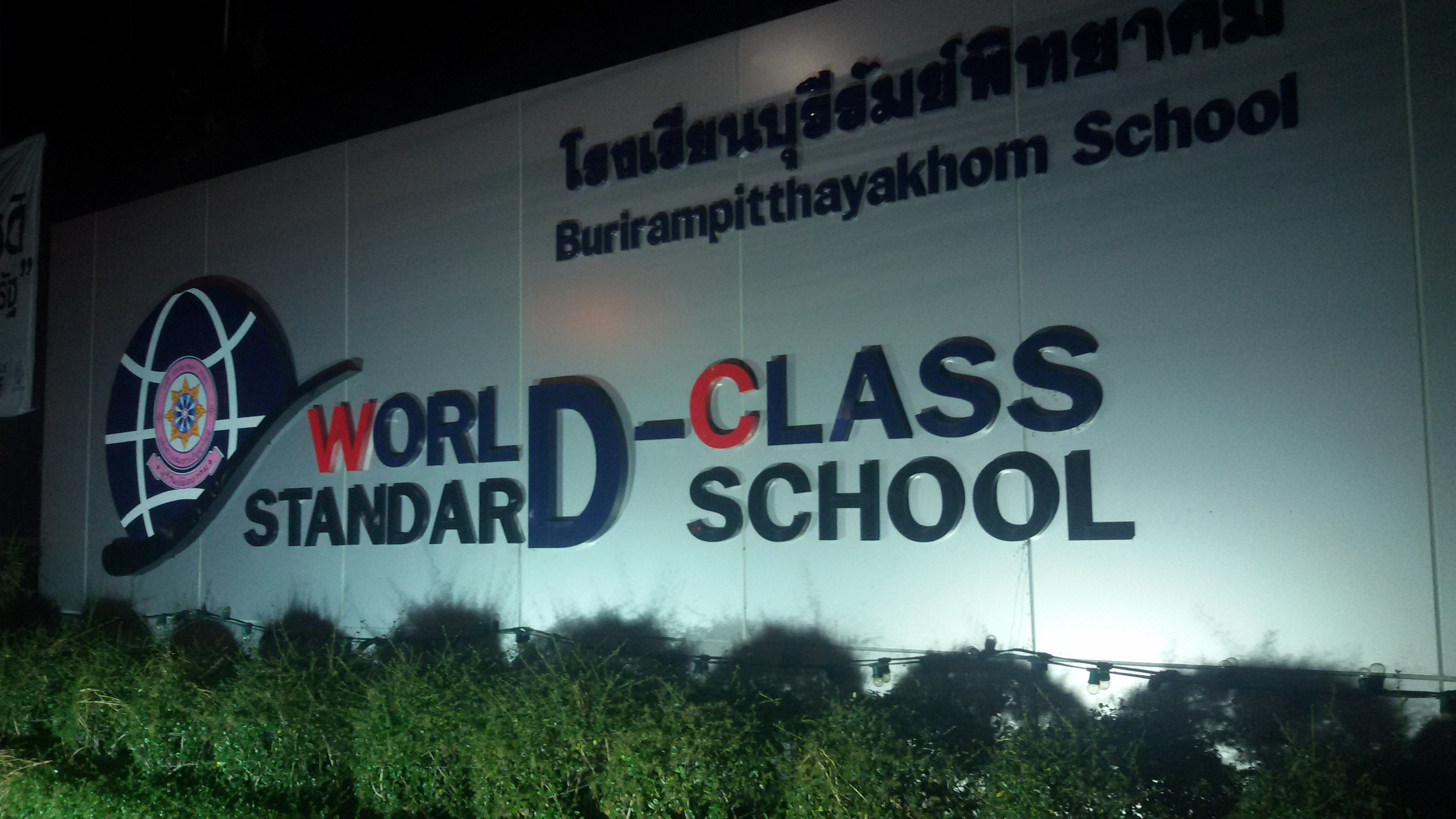
The Buriram Pittayakhom School sign at night

Pre-primary

- Thesaban Mueang Buriram Child Development Center
- Buriram Hospital Child Development Center

Pre-primary and Primary

- Buriram Kindergarten School
- Hua Khiaw School
- Thesaban 3 School
- Anuban Theera School
- Buriram Ratjabhat University Demonstration School

Pre-primary, Primary and Secondary

- Marie Anusorn School
- Burirat Darun Wittaya School, or Thesaban 1 School
- Isan Theera Wittayakan School, or Thesaban 2 School
- Trai Kam Sittisil School

Secondary

- Burirat Darun Wittaya School, or Thesaban 1 School
- Buriram Pittayakhom School (Provincial school)
- Isan Koson Suksa School

Colleges

- Buriram Technical College
- Buriram Polytechnic

University

- Buriram Rajabhat University
