= Confédération africaine des travailleurs croyants =

Confédération africaine des travailleurs croyants (French for 'African Confederation of Believing Workers') may refer to:

- The West African Confédération africaine des travailleurs croyants
- The Central African Confédération africaine des travailleurs croyants
- The Congolese Confédération africaine des travailleurs croyants, and other organizations that emerged from the two regional CATCs.
