= Dang Jittakorn =

Thai pop singer, songwriter and producer

- แดง จิตกร
- Born: Somchit Kethphukeaw; February 14, 1970; Si Chomphu, Khon Kaen, Thailand
- Died: April 30, 2016 (aged 46); Khu Mueang, Buriram, Thailand
- Other name: Turbo Boy
- Occupations: Singer; songwriter; music producer; actor
- Musical career
- Genres: T-Pop; pop rock; luk thung
- Instrument: Vocals
- Years active: 1994–2016
- Labels: Symphony; KCS Group; CMC Entertainment; Topline

Somchit Kethphukeaw (สมจิตร เกตุภูเขียว) (February 14, 1970 – April 30, 2016), known professionally as Dang Jittakorn (แดง จิตกร) was a Thai pop singer, songwriter and music producer, known mostly for his Luk thung songs during the 2000s and 2010s. He was nicknamed "Turbo Boy" from a character in one of his songs.

== Life and career ==
Dang was born in Khon Kaen, Thailand. At an early age, he lived with his grandmother after his parents separated. At age 18, he joined a local band as part of their backstage team. When a vacancy occurred due to one of the main singers becoming ill, he was given a chance to perform.

In 1994, Dang releases his debut album, which was unsuccessful. After this, he moved to KCS Group for the next album. In 1999, Dang released the album, Nam Ta Pha Lhao (น้ำตาผ่าเหล้า), through Lawan Entertainment and distributed by C.M.C Company, which was successful. But due to contract and copyright disagreements, he left C.M.C. the following years. He joined Topline Music and in 2000 he released his 7th album, Pha Lhao Pha Ruk (ผ่าเหล้าผ่ารัก), which included a song of the same name. His next album contained the very successful song, "Hua Jai Kued Hod" (หัวใจคึดฮอด). In July 2002, Dang released his 11th album, Bork Ai Dai Bor, with the successful single "Mon Ruk Tor Jor Wor" (มนต์รัก ตจว), a ballad which was popular among rural people who commuted to work in the city. In December 2003, he released his 12th album, Kor Pen Arlai Ruk, which was another success, and in 2004 he made his film debut as the lead actor in a movie produced by Topline Music. It was released as a VCD in 2005.

In March 2007, Dang released 15th album, Hua Jai Sah Mae Huk, which contained the song, "Sukkawar Nah Nhao" (สักวาหน้าหนาว). The song made several radio station charts, and became so popular that the album was re-titled to the same name as the song.

On September 15, 2010, Dang released the album, Happy Missing Day, which contained a couple of promotion songs. At this time he also released the first music video, "Bork Kub Kao Wa...Kee Mao Tho Ma" (บอกกับเขาว่า... ขี้เมาโทรมา), both on TV and online. He was inactive for the next four years, before releasing his next album, Sao Sar Luem Sorrapun, on May 20, 2014. The album contained the songs, "Sao 3G" (สาว 3G) and "Sao Sar Luem Sorrapun" (สาวส่าลิมสรภัญญ์). He also released a music video via YouTube on July 14, 2014.

=== Death ===
In September 2015, Dang told a news agency that in May he had been diagnosed with throat cancer. He put his career on hold for immediate treatment. By April 2016 his cancer had spread to stage 5. He began treatment at Buriram Hospital on April 14, however on April 30, Dang died from nasopharynx cancer in his home.

== Discography ==
=== Studio albums ===
- 1994 – Ror Por Phor Hua Jai (รปภ. หัวใจ)
- 1995 – Apai Pee ... Na (อภัยพี่...นะ)
- 1996 – Fah Klai Din (ฟ้าไกลดิน)
- 1997 – Jod Mai Teung Toi (จดหมายถึงต้อย)
- 1998 – Pee Dang Kon Derm (พี่แดงคนเดิม)
- 1999 – Luem Jai Wai Isan (ลืมใจไว้อีสาน)
- 2000 – Pha Lhao Pha Ruk (ผ่าเหล้าผ่ารัก)
- 2000 – Hua Jai Kued Hod (หัวใจคึดฮอด)
- 2001 – Rak Salai Kang Hai Lhao (รักสลายข้างไหเหล้า)
- 2001 – Namta Nah Darn (น้ำตาหน้าด้าน)
- 2002 – Bork Ai Dai Bor (บอกอ้ายได้บ่)
- 2003 – Kor Pen Arlai Ruk (ขอเป็นอะไหล่รัก)
- 2004 – Kued Hord Barn Hao Noh (คึดฮอดบ้านเฮาเนาะ)
- 2005 – Pee Dang Kon Derm (พี่แดงคนเดิม) Note: This is original album name, but using all new songs.
- 2007 – Sukkawar Nah Nhao (สักวาหน้าหนาว) Former names, Hua Jai Sah Mae Huk (หัวใจสะแหมฮัก)
- 2008 – Huang Jao... Sao Rong Ngarn (ห่วงเจ้า...สาวโรงงาน)
- 2009 – Ngarm Karm Pee (งามข้ามปี)
- 2010 – Sook Suk Wun Kid Hord (สุขสันต์วันคิดฮอด)
- 2014 – Sao Sa Luem Sorrapun (สาวส่าลืมสรภัญญ์)

=== Compilation albums ===
- 2001 – Best Hits: Dang Jittakorn (รวมฮิต แดง จิตกร)
- 2003 – Dang...Talub Thong (แดง...ตลับทอง)
- 2005 – Greatest Hit 16 songs (รวมฮิต 16 เพลงดังตลับเพชร)
- 2010 – Topline's 16 Greatest Hits Collection Vol.6 (รวมเพลงดัง 16 เพลงฮิต ชุดที่ 6)
- 2012 – Sib Hok Pleng Dung Pun Lan (16 เพลงดังพันล้าน)
- 2016 – Perd Tum Narm (เปิดตำนาน แดง จิตกร)
- 2016 – Duay Ruk Lae Pook Pun (ด้วยรักและผูกพัน) (MP3 Only)

=== Spacial Album ===
- 2006 – Ruam Hit Pleng Morlum Vol.1 – 2 (รวมฮิตเพลงหมอลำ)
