= Confédération nationale des syndicats du Mali =

Confédération nationale des syndicats du Mali ('National Confederation of Trade Unions of Mali', abbreviated CNSM) was a trade union confederation in the Mali Federation. CNMS was founded at a congress in Dakar April 2–6, 1960, gathering all Senegalese and Soudanese trade unions except CATC. When the Mali Federation was dissolved CNSM was also disbanded and its constituents resumed independent activities.
