= Chaiyaphum Hospital =

Hospital in Chaiyaphum, Thailand

Chaiyaphum Hospital โรงพยาบาลชัยภูมิ
- The Ministry of Public Health Health District 9

Geography
- Location: 12 Bannakan Road, Nai Mueang Subdistrict, Mueang Chaiyaphum district, Chaiyaphum 36000, Thailand

Organisation
- Type: Regional
- Affiliated university: Institute of Medicine, Suranaree University of Technology; Faculty of Medicine Vajira Hospital, Navamindradhiraj University

Services
- Beds: 678

History
- Opened: 24 June 1953

Links
- Website: cph.moph.go.th
- Lists: Hospitals in Thailand

Chaiyaphum Hospital (Thai: โรงพยาบาลชัยภูมิ) is the main hospital of Chaiyaphum province, Thailand. It is classified under the Ministry of Public Health as a regional hospital. It has a CPIRD Medical Education Center which trains doctors for the Institute of Medicine of Suranaree University of Technology. It is also an affiliated hospital of the Faculty of Medicine Vajira Hospital, Navamindradhiraj University. It is capable of tertiary care.

== History ==
The construction of Chaiyaphum Hospital started on 31 October 1949. It was opened on 24 June 1953. On 1 May 2013, the hospital made an agreement to train medical students and act as a clinical teaching hospital for the Institute of Medicine, Suranaree University of Technology and medical students are trained here annually under the Collaborative Project to Increase Production of Rural Doctors (CPIRD) program.

Chaiyaphum Hospital was made a regional hospital in 2022.

== See also ==
- Healthcare in Thailand
- Hospitals in Thailand
- List of hospitals in Thailand
