= Surin Hospital =

Hospital in Surin, Thailand

Surin Hospital โรงพยาบาลสุรินทร์
- The Ministry of Public Health Health District 9

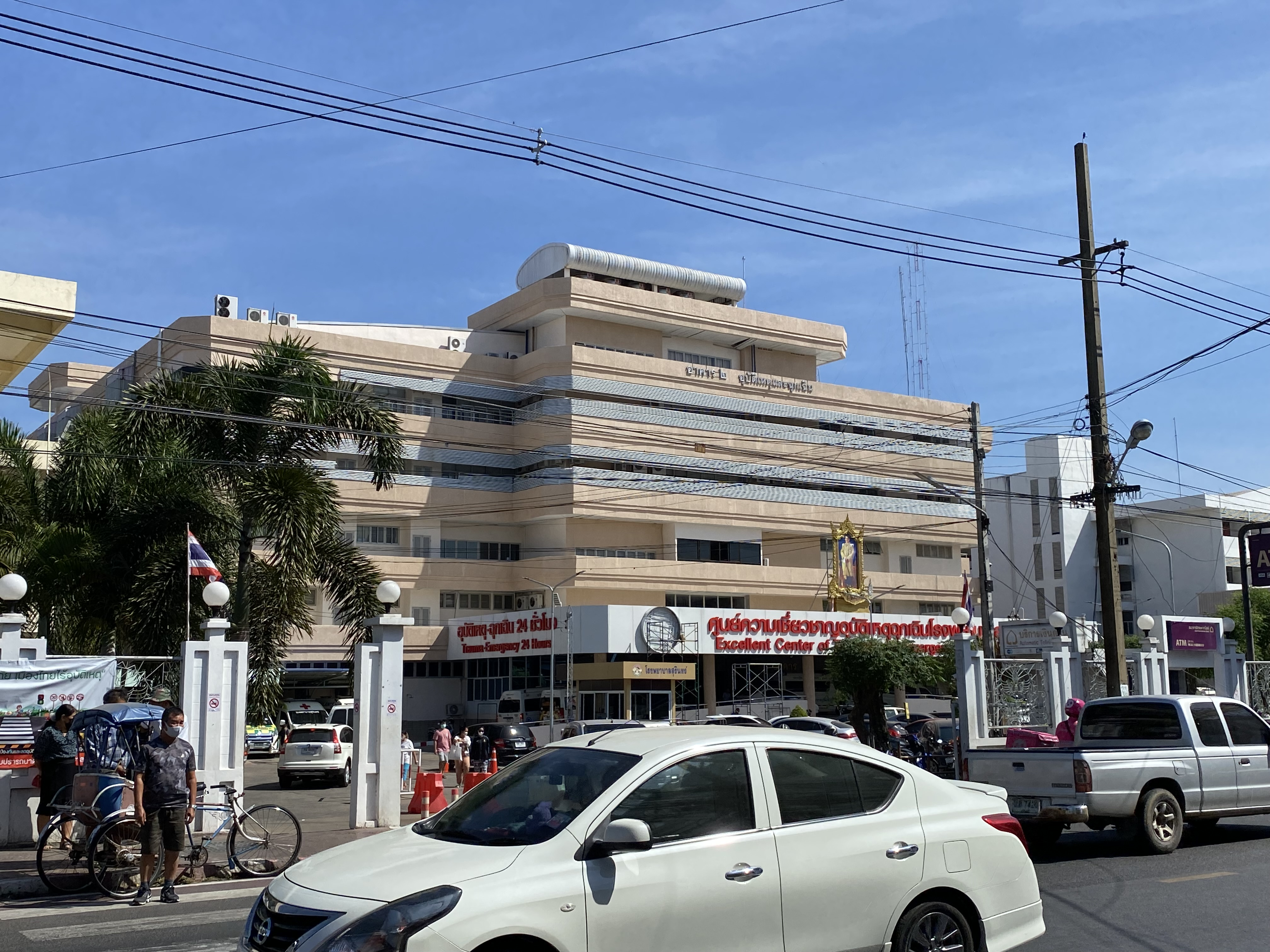

Geography
- Location: 68 Lak Mueang Road, Nai Mueang Subdistrict, Mueang Surin District, Surin 32000, Thailand
- Coordinates: 14.876813°N 103.502736°E

Organisation
- Type: Regional
- Affiliated university: Institute of Medicine, Suranaree University of Technology

Services
- Beds: 914

History
- Opened: 1 March 1951

Links
- Website: www.surinhospital.org
- Lists: Hospitals in Thailand

Surin Hospital (Thai: โรงพยาบาลสุรินทร์) is the main hospital of Surin Province, Thailand. It is classified under the Ministry of Public Health as a regional hospital. It has a CPIRD Medical Education Center which trains doctors for the Institute of Medicine of Suranaree University of Technology.

== History ==
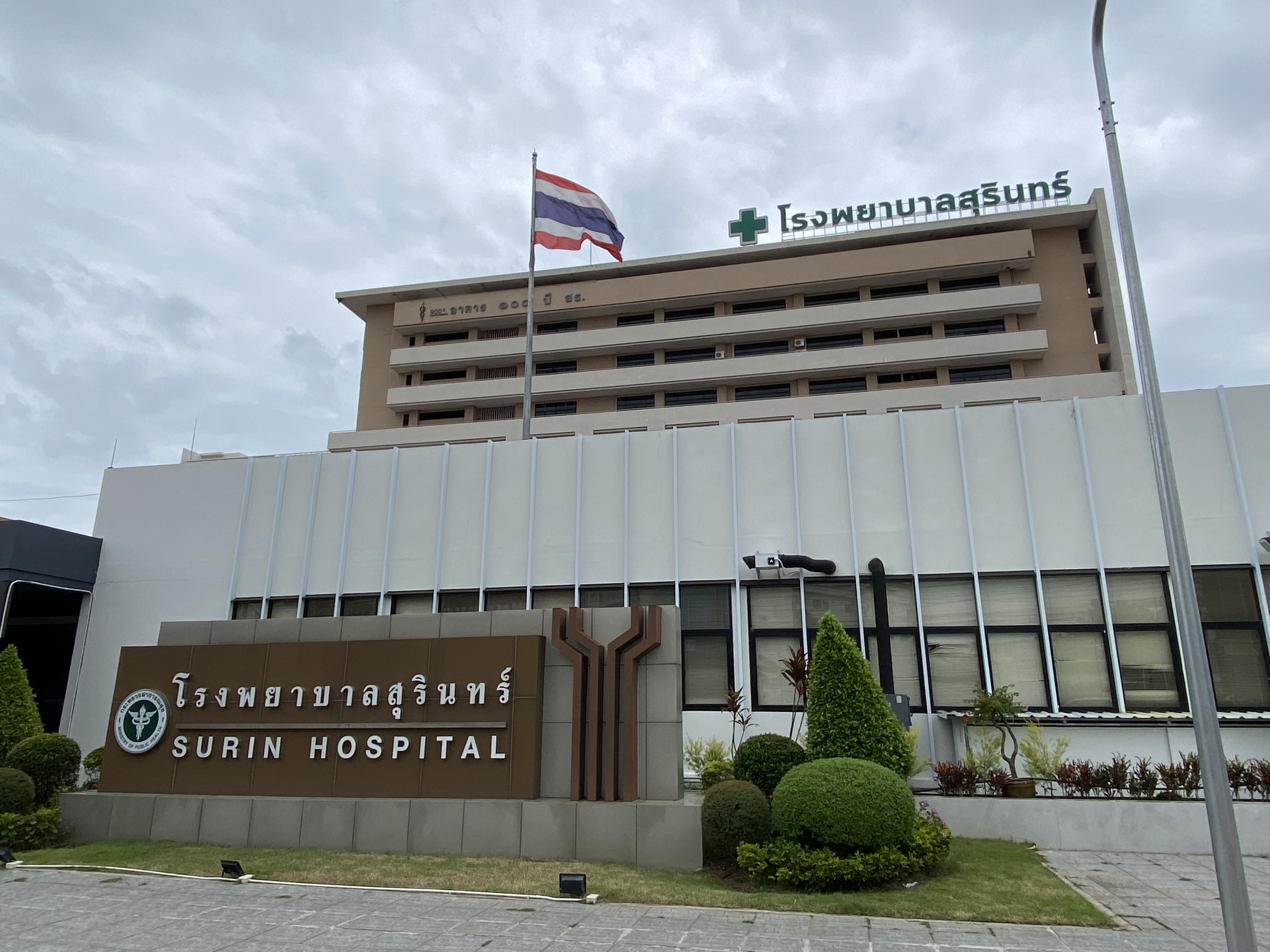
The hospital sign with 100-year Ministry of Health building as background

The funding for the construction of a hospital in Surin Province was donated by a monk "Khunaros Silakhan Khanananthamma", the abbot of Jumphon Suthawas Temple in Surin. The foundation stone was laid on 28 March 1949 and the hospital opened on 1 March 1951 as a single-storey wooden building with 50 beds and two full-time doctor. By 1956, an X-ray and Surgical Department was constructed. The hospital was then gradually expanded and became a regional hospital on 29 April 1997. It started Hospital Accreditation work (HA) in 1998 and first received ISO 9001:2000 on 2 August 2001. Today, it serves up to 914 beds with 2,709 staff.

== Gallery ==
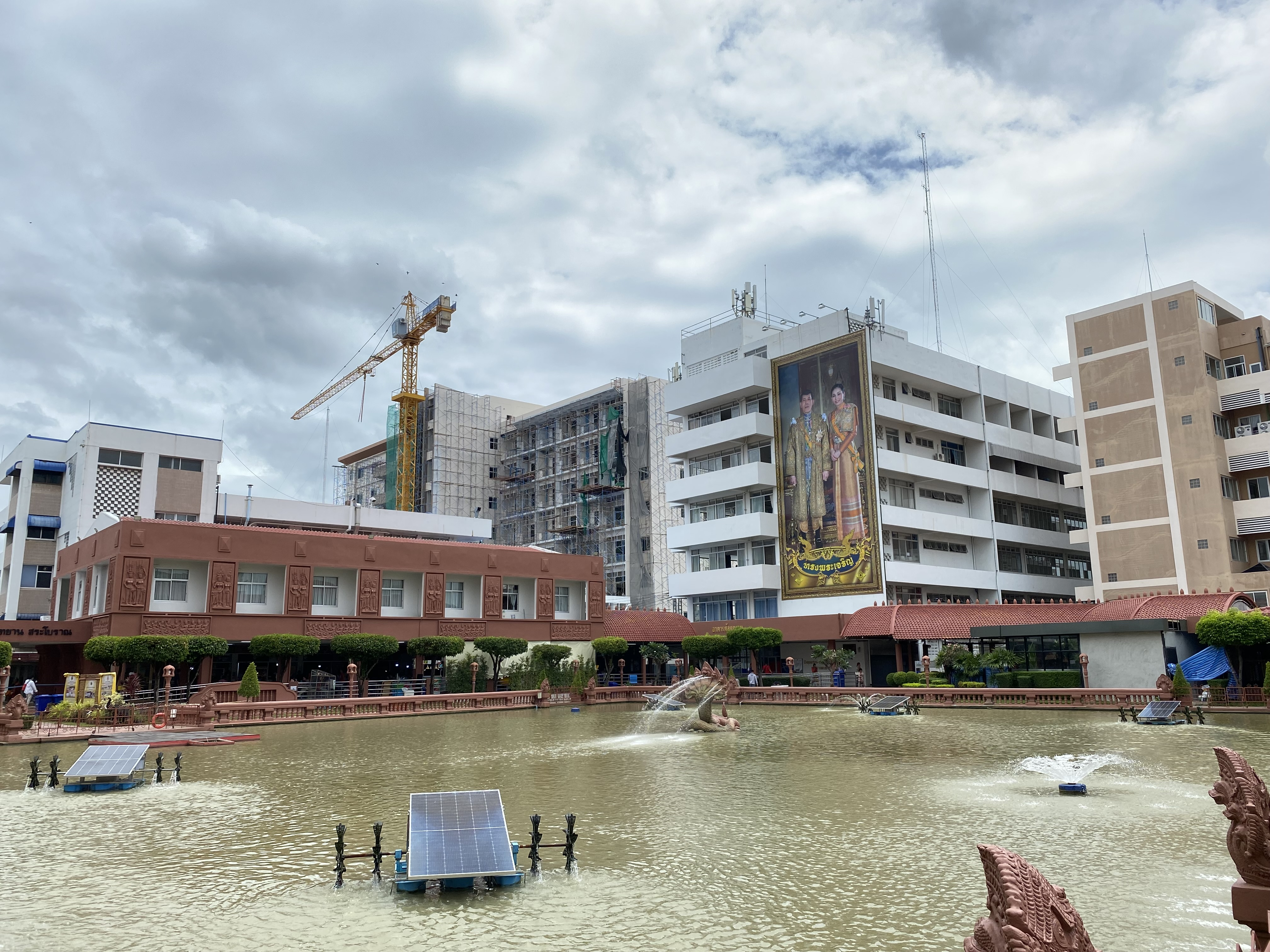
Ancient pond inside hospital

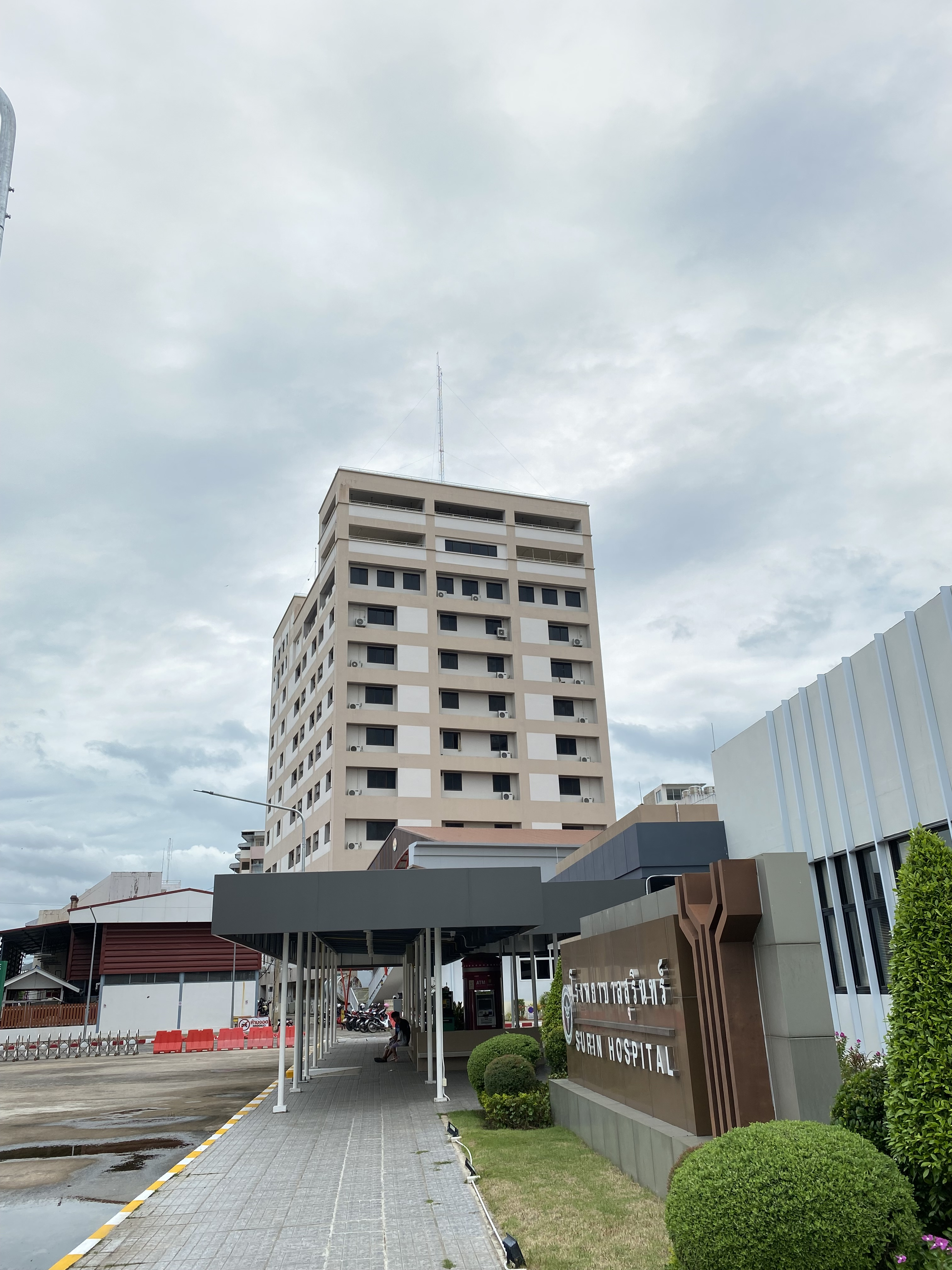
Medical education center building

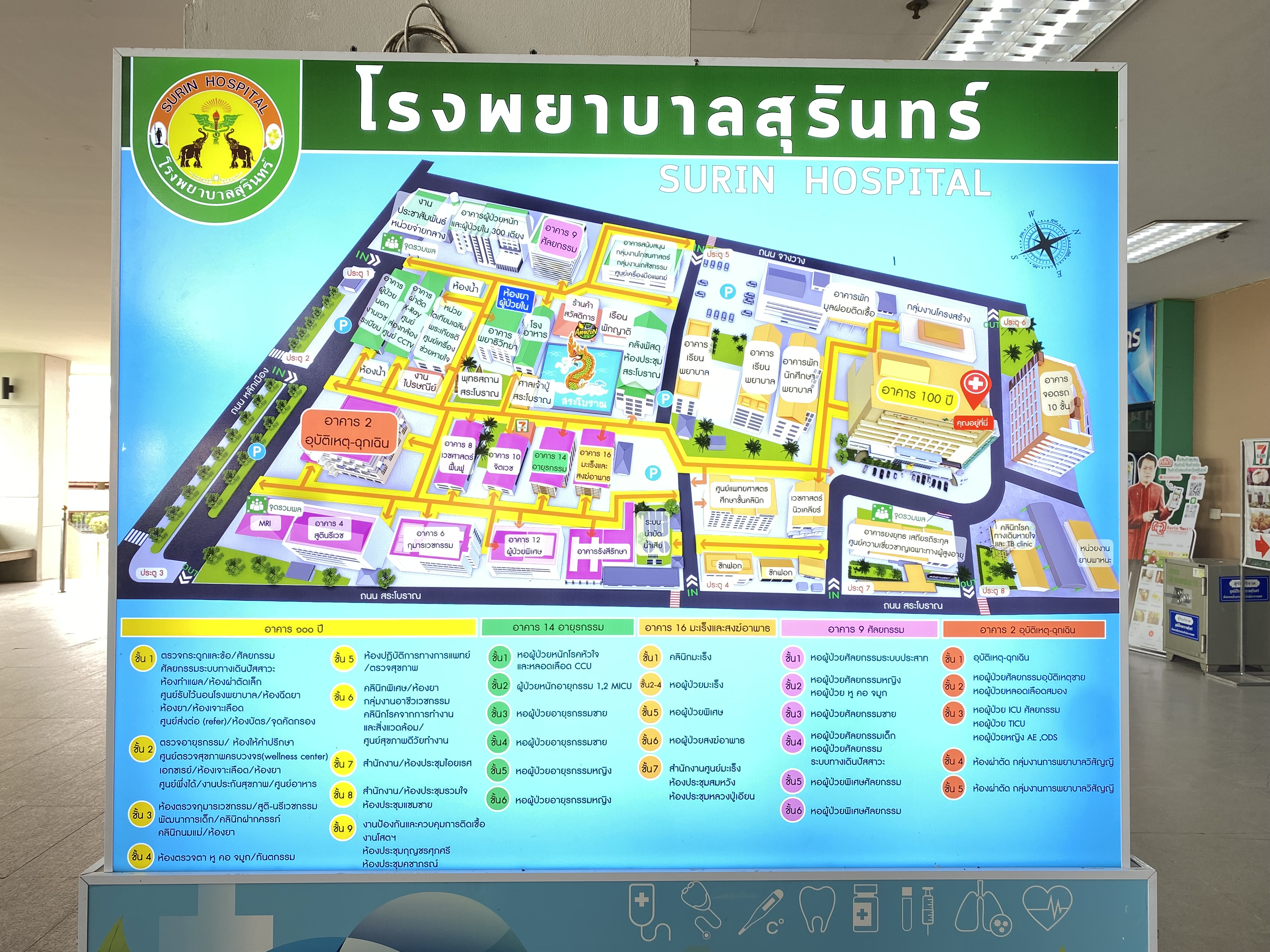
Hospital directory

== See also ==
- Healthcare in Thailand
- Hospitals in Thailand
- List of hospitals in Thailand
