= Institute of Medicine, Suranaree University of Technology =

Medical school in Northeastern Thailand

- สำนักวิชาแพทยศาสตร์ มหาวิทยาลัยเทคโนโลยีสุรนารี
- Type: Public (non-profit)
- Established: 15 December 1993
- Parent institution: Suranaree University of Technology
- Dean: Assoc. Prof. Sutham Pincharoen, M.D.
- Location: 111 University Avenue, Suranari Subdistrict, Mueang Nakhon Ratchasima District, Nakhon Ratchasima 30000, Thailand
- Colors: Green
- Website: http://im.sut.ac.th/Default.aspx

The Institute of Medicine, Suranaree University of Technology (Thai: สำนักวิชาแพทยศาสตร์ มหาวิทยาลัยเทคโนโลยีสุรนารี) is a medical school in Northeastern Thailand, located in Mueang Nakhon Ratchasima District, Nakhon Ratchasima Province.

== History ==
Following a cabinet meeting on 12 September 1992, it was resolved that due to a lack of medical personnel in Thailand, the medical school universities should increase intake of 340 more medical students for the 1993 academic year. In addition, medical schools should also be set up in regional parts of Thailand and this included an Institute of Medicine at Suranaree University of Technology, approved on 15 December 1993. In January 1995, the university set up a Health Science systems project, consisting of the institutes of Medicine, Dentistry, Pharmacy, Nursing and a Medical Center. However, due to the 1997 Asian financial crisis, the project was temporarily halted. The first cohort of medical students were accepted in 2006.

== Teaching Hospitals ==
- Suranaree University of Technology Hospital
- Surin Hospital (CPIRD)
- Buriram Hospital (CPIRD)
- Chaiyaphum Hospital (CPIRD)

== See also ==
- List of medical schools in Thailand
