= General Union of Negro African Workers =

The General Union of Negro African Workers, more widely known by its French name Union générale des travailleurs d'Afrique noire ('General Workers Union of Black Africa', abbreviated UGTAN), was a pan-African trade union organization. Ahmed Sékou Touré was the main leader of the organization. In its heyday, around 90% of the trade unions in Francophone West Africa were affiliated to UGTAN.

== History ==
=== Foundation ===
UGTAN was founded at a conference in Cotonou on January 16, 1957, through the merger of Confédération générale des travailleurs africains (CGTA), the West African branches of the French Confédération générale du travail (CGT) and some independent unions. The conference was held following a call from the railway workers' union to build an independent and united African trade union centre. The Cotonou conference called for the setting up of UGTAN branches across West Africa. Challenging colonialism, UGTAN declared itself as independent from French union centres.

Confédération africaine des travailleurs croyants (CATC) participated in the Cotonou conference, but abstained from voting in the election for a Provisional Executive of UGTAN, stating that they wished to confer with their member organizations on affiliation to UGTAN. In the end CATC remained outside of UGTAN, wishing to remain a non-political union organization. Another group that resisted integration in UGTAN were unions in French Equatorial Africa linked to the pro-Soviet World Federation of Trade Unions. Countering UGTAN, the WTFU-affiliated Cameroonian trade union centre CGTK launched Confédération générale aéfienne du travail (CGAT). In Soviet discourse, UGTAN was condemned as a 'petty bourgeois-racist' entity.

=== Bamako conference and loi cadre ===
At the onset UGTAN committees were dominated by people hailing from the CGT, with Abdoulaye Diallo as general secretary. However, the influence of the CGT leaders was soon outmaneuvered by the former CGTA functionaries under the helm of Sékou Touré. The UGTAN leadership met in Bamako in March 1958. By this time the organization was faced with internal difficulties. The expansion of the organization had been stalled at many points. Nor had a functioning UGTAN administration been set up. Moreover, under the loi cadre autonomy had been established in the French West African territories, enabling many UGTAN leaders to assume public offices, creating confusion as to whom represented the government and whom represented the union movement leadership. After the 1957 elections UGTAN leaders became Ministers of Labour or Ministers of Civil Service in seven out of the nine territories of French West Africa. Abdoulaye Diallo (Minister of Labour of French Sudan) was amongst the UGTAN leaders that moved away from union organizing towards party politics.

=== 1958 referendum ===
A second meeting in Bamako, held September 10–11, 1958, decided that UGTAN would campaign for a 'No' vote (i.e. for independence) in the referendum on the French Community. Union syndicale des travailleurs de Guinée, the Guinean section of UGTAN, formed one of the pillars in guaranteeing a victory for the 'No' side in Guinea. However many other sectors of UGTAN did not heed the call from the Bamako meeting, rather adopting the 'Yes' line of the political parties that they were aligned with. The Ivorian section outright rejected the 'No' line. The referendum campaign left UGTAN divided. The Senegalese Progressive Union (UPS) managed to divide UGTAN in Senegal, and a new organization (UGTAN-Autonome) was founded under the leadership of Abbas Guèye.

UGTAN participated in the December 1958 All-African Peoples' Conference, and voiced its support to the Ghana–Guinea Union.

=== UGTAN congress ===
UGTAN held its general congress in Conakry January 15–18, 1959. In his report to the congress, Sékou Touré emphasized three points: African independence, the political contributions of the trade union movement and international relations. Delegations from the French CGT, All-China Federation of Trade Unions, AFL–CIO and national trade union confederations of Ghana, Morocco, Algeria and Tunisia participated in the event. The congress elected Sékou Touré as president as UGTAN and John Tettegah (from the Ghana Trades Union Congress) as vice president.

=== Splits in Senegal ===
In mid-1959 the Senegalese branch was again divided, as the UGTAN general secretary Alioune Cissé broke away and founded UGTAN-unitaire. The loyalist wing in Senegal, also known as UGTAN-orthodoxe, was led by Seydou Diallo. Likewise there were other splits in the movement. In March 1959 seventeen Nigerien unions broke with UGTAN, and founded UGTAN-Autonome in Niger.

=== Suppression ===
UGTAN came into conflicts with local governments in several of the colonies. In Niger, Dahomey and Upper Volta the authorities sought to suppress the movement. In Niger the UGTAN leader and former Minister of Labour Saloum Traoré was exiled. In Ivory Coast tension between the trade union movement (UGTAN and CATC) and the government of Félix Houphouët-Boigny arose, as the government sought to build a yellow union in the public sector. The conflict escalated in the second half of 1959, as the leader of the Ivorian UGTAN branch Yao N'go Blaise was exiled to Guinea. UGTAN called for strikes (which never materialized), while the government declared martial law. Many union leaders were arrested and many public employees were fired from their jobs. In Senegal the UGTAN branch (i.e. the 'orthodox' UGTAN) was banned by the government on November 22, 1960. Several key UGTAN leaders were imprisoned. The remnants of the orthodox UGTAN would later form the Union sénégalaise des travailleurs in 1962.
