= Somali Confederation of Labour =

CSL
- Somali Confederation of Labour
- Founded: 1949
- Dissolved: 1969
- Headquarters: Mogadishu
- Location: Somalia
- Members: 5,300 (1964)
- Affiliations: ICFTU, African Trade Union Confederation

The Somali Confederation of Labour (Italian: Confederazione Somala dei Lavoratori, abbreviated CSL) was a national trade union centre in Somalia. CSL was founded in 1949. CSL was closely linked to the ruling Somali Youth League, but retained organizational independence.

== Early period ==
The organization was initially known as Sindacato Lavoratori della Somalia ('Workers Trade Union of Somalia'). During its early days it only organized administrative employees.

== International affiliations ==
The organization became a member of the International Confederation of Free Trade Unions (ICFTU) in 1955 and was a founding member of the African Trade Union Confederation (ATUC).

== 1962 conflict ==
Following the CSL congress held in September 1962 the movement was rocked by internal, tribal conflict, prompting the ICFTU to send its assistant general secretary Stefan Nędzyński to Somalia in February 1963 in order to resolve the issues at hand. CSL was able to reunite, but its organization in Villabruzzi had broken away from the parent body and joined a rival union.

== Heydays ==
As of the mid 1960s CSL was the largest trade union centre in the country, with fourteen affiliated unions and claiming around 5,300 members (roughly one percent of wage earners in the country at the time). Its most important union, FNLPA, was active in the plantation sector.

In 1965 the Somali Federation of Labour (based in the northern parts of the country) merged with CSL, strengthening the position of CSL as the dominant labour force in the country. As of the late 1960s, Said Yusuf Ali "Bos" was the CSL chairman and Omar Nur Abd the general secretary of the organization.

== Coup and decline ==
The October 1969 coup d'état of Siad Barre changed the situation for the Somali trade union movement dramatically. CSL and other trade union centres were banned and their leaders were imprisoned. CSL was no longer recognized as an ICFTU affiliate following the coup d'état. The ICFTU did however retain contacts with CSL leaders.
