= Confédération africaine des travailleurs croyants de l'A.E.F =

C.A.T.C-A.E.F
- Confédération africaine des travailleurs croyants de l'A.E.F
- Founded: January 2, 1957
- Headquarters: B.P. 666, Brazzaville, Moyen-Congo
- Location: French Equatorial Africa
- Key people: Gilbert Pongualt, chairman

The Confédération africaine des travailleurs croyants de l'A.E.F ('African Confederation of Believing Workers of French Equatorial Africa', abbreviated C.A.T.C-A.E.F) was a trade union confederation in French Equatorial Africa. CATC was founded in Pointe-Noire January 2–6, 1957 by the branches of the French trade union centre C.F.T.C in Gabon, Moyen-Congo, Chad and Ubangi-Shari. Gilbert Pongault was the chairman of C.A.T.C-A.E.F. The C.A.T.C-A.E.F retained a separate organization from the West African C.A.T.C, which had been formed a few months earlier. The two organizations did however maintain contacts between each other, albeit the attitude of C.A.T.C.-A.E.F towards its counterpart was characterized by jealousy towards the stronger unions in West Africa.

C.A.T.C-A.E.F claimed to be an apolitical trade union organization. C.A.T.C-A.E.F supported pluralism in the trade union movement and the notion of Pan-Africa Christian trade unionism. However, by using the word 'Believer' instead of 'Christian' (as in the original C.F.T.C name), C.A.T.C-A.E.F sought to include Muslim workers. Still, C.A.T.C-A.E.F was funded by the Catholic Church and became an affiliate of the International Federation of Christian Trade Unions. And in spite of its apolitical profile, C.A.T.C-A.E.F did produce cadres for political parties, such as U.D.D.I.A in Congo.

In 1959 Pongault founded a new organization, Union panafricaine des travailleurs croyants ('Pan-African Union of Believing Workers' U.P.T.C), seeking to expand its activities beyond French Equatorial Africa. The local branches of C.A.T.C-A.E.F became national trade union centres, affiliated to UPTC. National trade union centres born out C.A.T.C-A.E.F were C.A.T.C-Congo, C.A.T.C-Gabon, C.A.T.C-Republique Centrafricaine, C.A.T.C-Tchad (later renamed the Confédération tchadienne de travail).
