= Trade Union Confederation of Togolese Workers =

CSTT
- Trade Union Confederation of Togolese Workers
- Confédération Syndicale des Travailleurs du Togo
- Headquarters: Lomé, Togo
- Location: Togo
- Key people: Adrien Akouété Beliki, secretary general
- Affiliations: ITUC

The Trade Union Confederation of Togolese Workers (CSTT) is a national trade union center in Togo. It is affiliated with the International Trade Union Confederation.

CSTT emerged from the Conféderation africain des travailleurs croyants, adopting the name Confédération togolaise des travailleurs croyants (CTTC) in 1962. CTTC changed name to CSTT in 1968.
