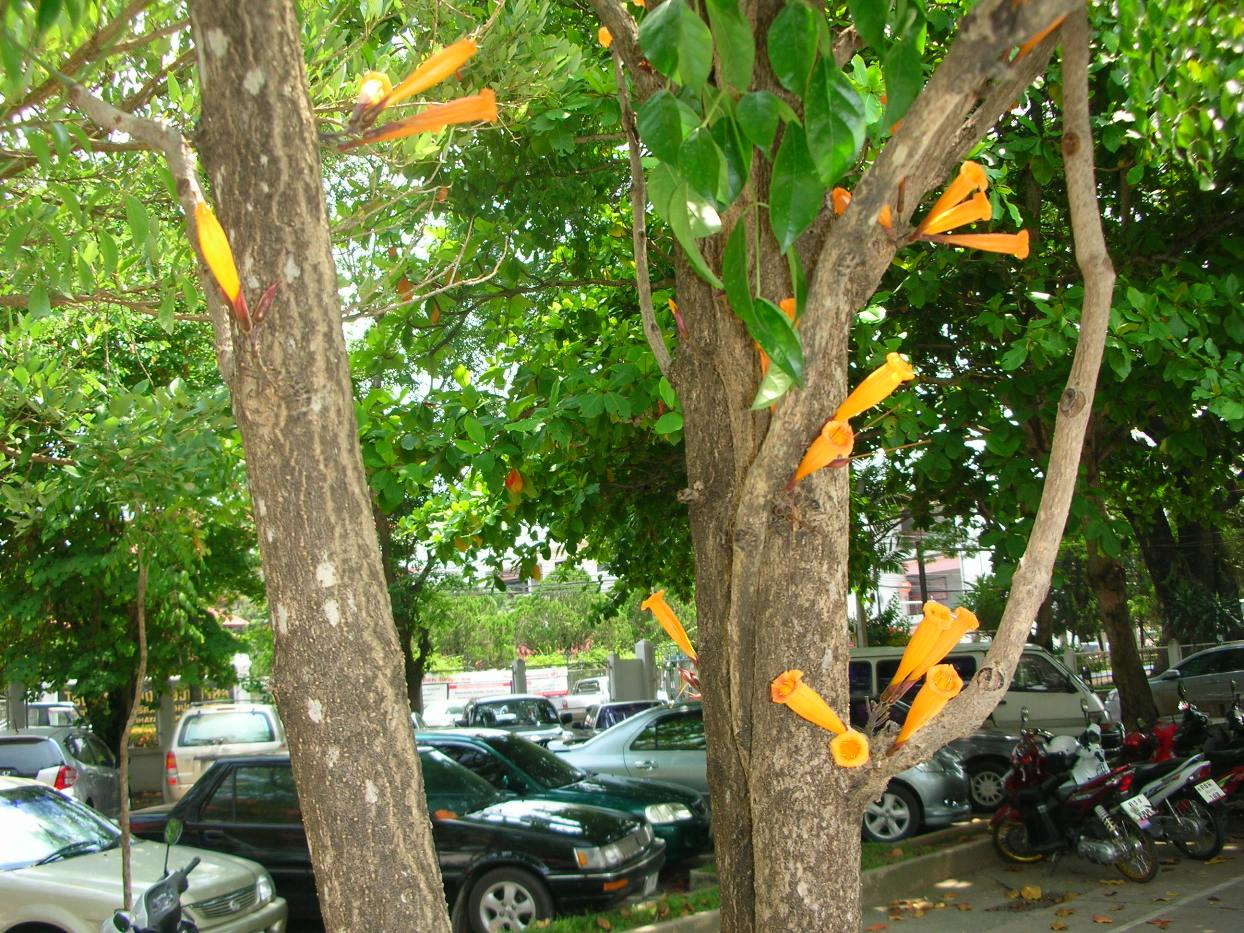

Conservation status
- Least Concern (IUCN 3.1)

Scientific classification
- Kingdom: Plantae
- Clade: Tracheophytes
- Clade: Angiosperms
- Clade: Eudicots
- Clade: Asterids
- Order: Lamiales
- Family: Bignoniaceae
- Genus: Mayodendron; Kurz
- Species: M. igneum

Binomial name
- Mayodendron igneum Kurz

Synonyms
- Radermachera ignea (Kurz) Steenis; Spathodea ignea Kurz; Spathodea igneum Kurz

= Mayodendron =

Genus of flowering plants

Mayodendron is a monotypic genus in the flowering plant family Bignoniaceae. The single species it contains, Mayodendron igneum, is native to southern China, India, Laos, Myanmar, and Vietnam. It is sometimes included within Radermachera.

It is a deciduous tree that grows up to 20 m in height and has striking orange-colored flowers that grow straight from the trunk.

This tree is the provincial tree of Chiang Rai Province, Thailand. It is also the tree of Suranaree University of Technology.
