= Saloum Traoré =

Saloum Traoré was a Nigerien politician and trade union leader. He was a leader of the General Union of Negro African Workers (UGTAN) in Niger. He belonged to the African Democratic Rally (RDA). In 1958 he served as Minister of Labour of Niger for a brief period. In early 1959 Traoré was exiled from Niger.
