= All-African Trade Union Federation =

Pan-African trade union organisation

- Merged into: OATUU
- Founded: 1959
- Dissolved: 1973
- Location: African region
- Affiliations: Independent

The All-African Trade Union Federation (AATUF) was a Pan-African trade union organisation.

The confederation was formed in November 1959 on the initiative of president Kwame Nkrumah of Ghana. The first independent organisation aiming to unite all African trade unions, it asked its affiliates not to hold membership of the two major global union confederations, the International Confederation of Free Trade Unions or the International Federation of Christian Trade Unions. However, many potential members disagreed with this approach, and instead formed the rival African Trade Union Confederation (ATUC).

The secretary of AATUF was Amadou N'diaye. The assistant secretary general was Ochola Ogaye Mak'Anyengo. Its headquarters were initially in Accra, and later in Dar es Salaam. By 1966, it had 31 affiliates, which claimed a total of 3,773,150 members.

In April 1973 AATUF merged with the ATUC and the Pan-African Workers' Congress, to form the Organisation of African Trade Union Unity (OATUU).

== Affiliates ==
The following unions were affiliated in 1965:

Union	Country
General Union of Algerian Workers	Algeria
National Union of Angolan Workers in Exile	Angola
Bechuanaland General Workers' Organisation	Bechuanaland
Basutoland Federation of Labour	Basutoland
Federation of Workers of Burundi	Burundi
General Union of Central African Workers	Central African Republic
National Union of Chadian Workers	Chad
Congolese Trade Union Confederation	Republic of the Congo
General Confederation of Congolese Workers	Democratic Republic of the Congo
General Union of Workers of Dahomey	Dahomey
African General Confederation of Labour	Gabon
Gambia Labour Union	Gambia
Ghana Trades Union Congress	Ghana
National Confederation of Workers of Guinea	Guinea
National Union of Workers of Portuguese Guinea	Guinea Bissau
National Union of Workers of Mali	Mali
Mauritius Trade Union Federation	Mauritius
Moroccan Labour Union	Morocco
Nigeria Trades Union Congress	Nigeria
National African Federation of Unions	Rhodesia
Senegalese Confederation of Workers	Senegal
Labour Secretariat of the Pan-African Congress	South Africa
South African Congress of Trade Unions	South Africa
South West African Workers' Union	South West Africa
Federation of Sudanese Workers' Unions	Sudan
Swaziland Congress of Trade Unions	Swaziland
National Union of Tanganyika Workers	Tanzania
Federation of Uganda Trade Unions	Uganda
United Arab Republic Federation of Labour	United Arab Republic
Federation of Voltan Workers' Trade Unions	Upper Volta
Zambia Congress of Trade Unions	Zambia

== Bibliography ==
- Agyeman, Opoku, The Failure of Grassroots Pan-Africanism: The Case of the All-African Trade Union Federation, ISBN 0-7391-0620-1.
