= National Confederation of Workers of Burkina =

Trade Union in Burkina Faso

Coordinates: 12°21′57.4″N 1°31′7.2″W

CNTB
- National Confederation of Workers of Burkina
- Confédération Nationale des Travailleurs Burkinabé
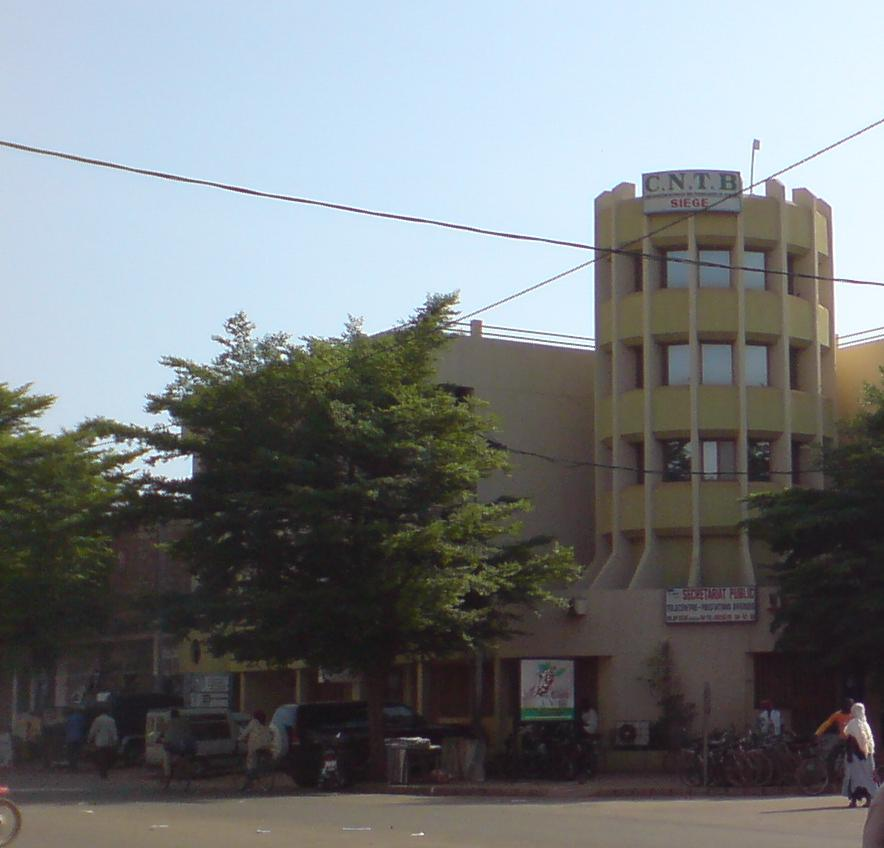
- Founded: 1950
- Headquarters: Ouagadougou, Burkina Faso
- Location: Burkina Faso
- Key people: Laurent Ouedraogo, secretary general
- Affiliations: ITUC

The Confédération Nationale des Travailleurs Burkinabé (trans. National Confederation of Workers of Burkina; CNTB) is a trade union centre in Burkina Faso. It is affiliated with the International Trade Union Confederation. CNTB emerged from the Confédération africaine des travailleurs croyants.
