= Union sénégalaise des travailleurs =

Union Sénégalaise des Travailleurs (Senegalese Workers Union) was a trade union federation in Senegal formed in 1962. The founders of UST included members of the erstwhile 'orthodox' faction of UGTAN. The UST was however divided. In October 1964, one wing of UST merged into UNTS. The following month, the remainder of UST founded the Confederation sénégalaise du travail (CST).
