= UGTAN-unitaire =

The UGTAN-unitaire was a trade union centre in Senegal. UGTAN-unitaire was formed in January 1959 through a split away from UGTAN. The founder of UGTAN-unitaire was Alioune Cissé, erstwhile UGTAN general secretary. UGTAN-unitaire wanted to unite West African trade unions within the French Community, but maintain independence from external international bodies. Later in 1959, UGTAN-unitaire merged with another UGTAN splinter group, UGTAN-autonome, to form UGTS.
