= National Federation of Plantation and Agricultural Workers =

Trade union in Somalia

The National Federation of Plantation and Agricultural Workers (FNLPA) was a plantation workers' trade union in Somalia. It was founded in 1958 and was affiliated to the Somali Confederation of Labour. FNLPA had contacts with the International Federation of Plantation, Agricultural and Allied Workers (IFPAAW). The organization had its headquarters in Merca.
