= Confédération africaine des travailleurs croyants-Republique Centrafricaine =

Confédération africaine des travailleurs croyants-Republique Centrafricain ('African Confederation of Believing Workers-Central African Republic', abbreviated CATC) was a national trade union centre in the Central African Republic. The organization emerged from the Ubangi-Shari branch of the French trade union centre CFTC, which became the Ubangi-Shari affiliate of the Confédération africaine des travailleurs croyants in 1957. CATC was affiliated to the International Federation of Christian Trade Unions.

In 1964 CATC was merged, under government pressure, into Union générale des travailleurs centrafricains.
