= Buriram Pittayakhom School =

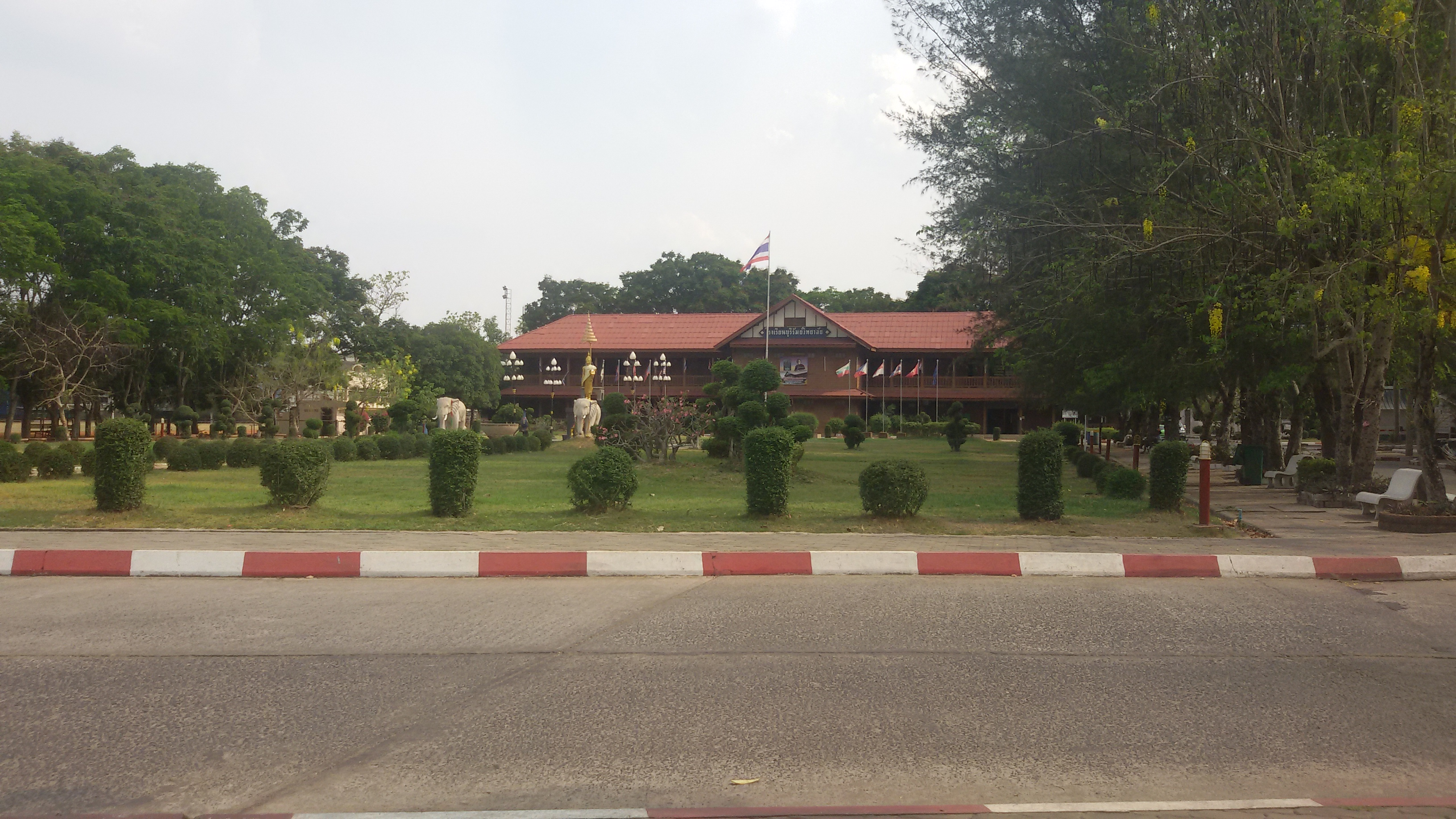

Location
- 15 Niwas Street, Mueang Buriram, Buriram, 31000; Thailand
- Coordinates: 15.003013°N 103.104308°E

Information
- Type: Secondary school
- Established: 1904
- Director: Phuwanat Yuphanwit
- Grades: 7–12 (mathayom 1–6)
- Gender: Coeducational
- Enrollment: 3,700 + (2013 academic year)
- Campus type: Urban
- Colour: Pink/Blue
- Song: March Buriram Pittayakhom
- Website: Official website

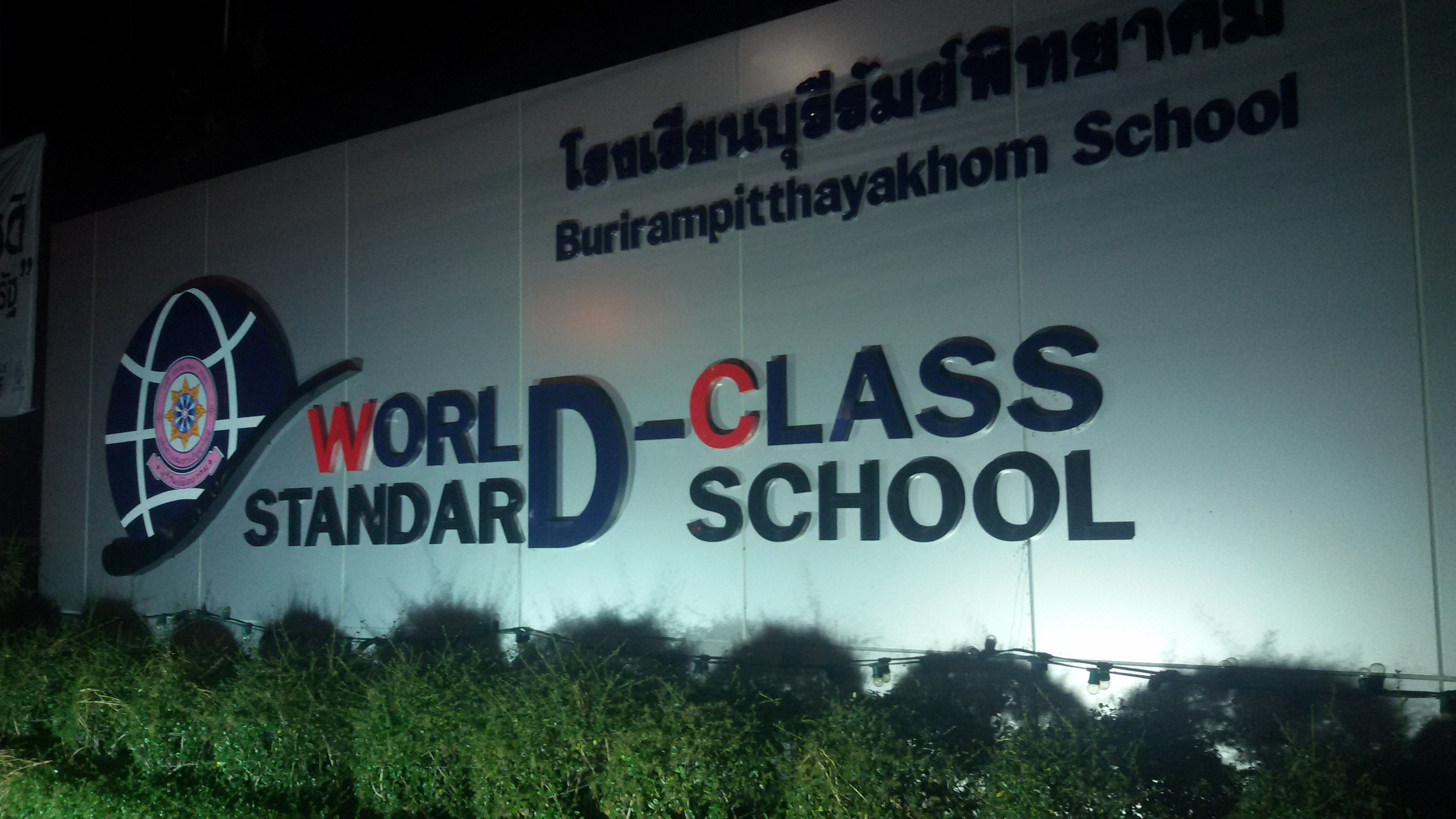
The school sign

Buriram Pittayakhom School (Thai: โรงเรียนบุรีรัมย์พิทยาคม) is a secondary school located in downtown Buriram Province, Thailand. It admits secondary students (mathayom 1–6, equivalent to grades 7–12). Founded in 1904, it then became the first coeducational school in Buriram. The school's former names were "Buriram Witthayalai School" and "Satree Si Buriram School". The first school principal was Mr. Jake Sukpanya.

== Campus ==
Buriram Pittayakhom School is located at 15 Niwas Rd., Muang District, Buriram Province.

The school has more than fifteen buildings, ten of which hold classrooms. Each of which is located separately in the school area.

Building 1 for social studies, is violet three-floors building. It was renovated in April 2013. There are 18 classrooms, include Guidance room and ASEAN Study Center room.

Building 2 for English and Chinese language, is yellow three-floors building. It is next to Building 1. It was renovated in August 2013. There are 18 classrooms. The building architecture is the same as Building 1.

Building 3 for Thai language, is very old three-floors building. It hasn't been renovated. It's in front of Building 2. There are about 20 classrooms, including a few science rooms.

Building 4 for science, is very old orange three-floors building. It's in front of Building 3. There are about 20 classrooms. The building architecture is the same as that of Building 3.

Building 5 for mathematics, is blue three-floors building. It was renovated in April 2012. It's in front of Building 1 and next to Building 3. There are 16 classrooms. The first floor is the headquarters.

Building 6 or Panya Wiwat Building is a 4-storey building organized as a classroom for art learning subjects. and special international classrooms.

Building 7 is a temporary one-story building. Organized as a group classroom for learning art.

Building 8 is a temporary one-story building. Organized as a group classroom for learning about careers.

Building 9 or Buriram Wittayalai School Building is a 2-storey wooden building that is classified as a classroom for learning health education and physical education. It is a building that received an award for outstanding conservation of art and architecture of the year 2013 in the category of institutional and public buildings.

Building 10 is a 5-storey building classified as a special group classroom, including a special science classroom. computer classroom, English-English special classroom and cafeteria 3.
