= Central Arkansas Telephone Cooperative =

Central Arkansas Telephone Cooperative (CATC) is a non-profit rural telephone utility cooperative serving the cities of Bismarck and Donaldson and the surrounding rural areas of Hot Spring County, Arkansas.

CATC was formed in 1951 after repeated efforts to lure the larger telephone companies into serving the area failed. The original office was located and still exists in Donaldson. However, area growth led to the opening of CATC's second office in Bismarck.

CATC is one of only two telephone cooperatives still operating in the state of Arkansas. As of December 2005, CATC serves over 3,400 customers.
