= Buriram Hospital =

Hospital in Buriram, Thailand

Buriram Hospital โรงพยาบาลบุรีรัมย์
- The Ministry of Public Health Health District 9

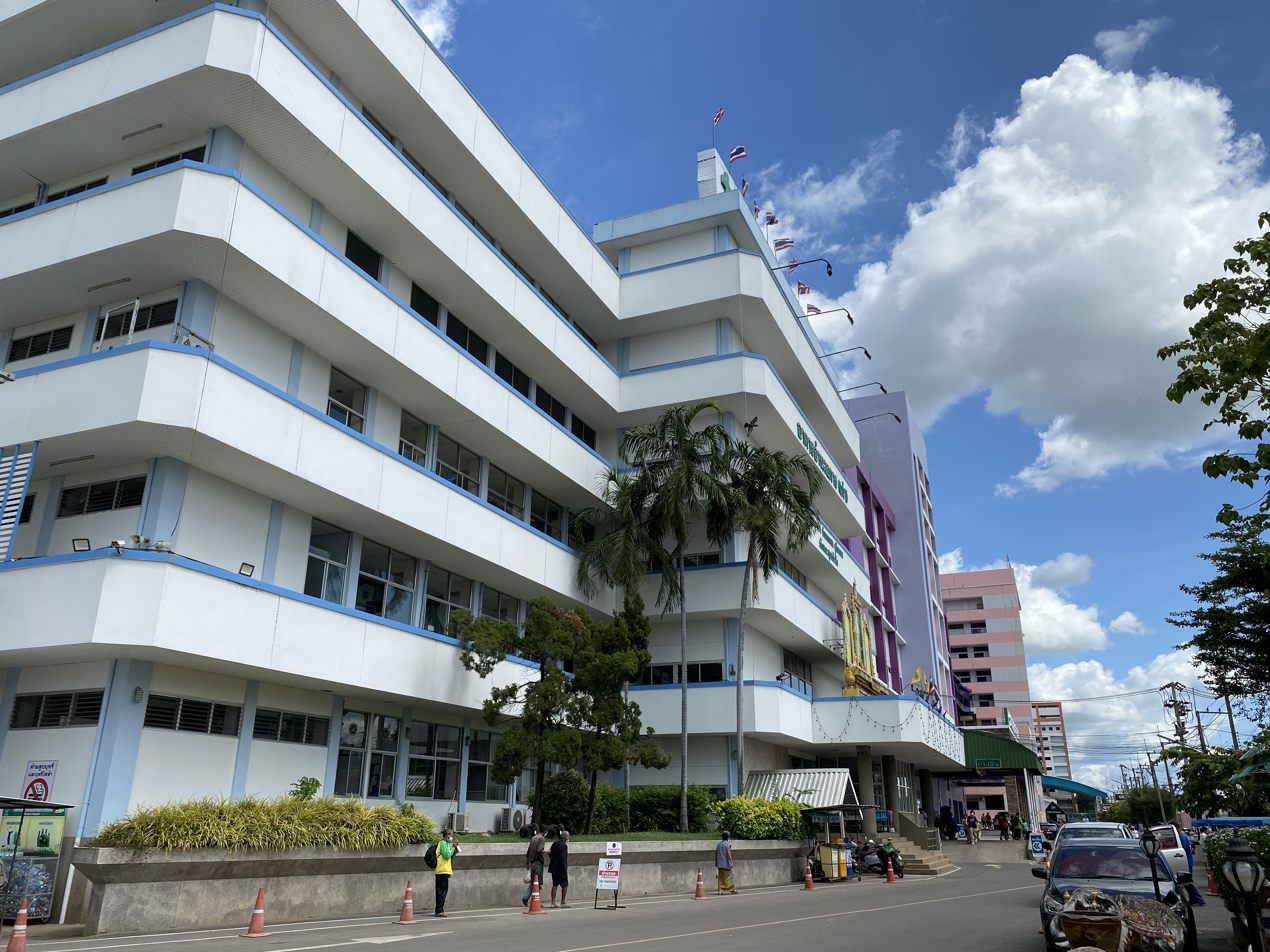

Geography
- Location: 10/1 Na Sathani Road, Nai Mueang Subdistrict, Mueang Buriram District, Buriram 31000, Thailand
- Coordinates: 15.005522°N 103.100657°E

Organisation
- Type: Regional
- Affiliated university: Institute of Medicine, Suranaree University of Technology; Faculty of Medicine Ramathibodi Hospital, Mahidol University

Services
- Beds: 895

History
- Opened: 10 March 1953

Links
- Website: www.brh.go.th/index.php
- Lists: Hospitals in Thailand

Buriram Hospital (Thai: โรงพยาบาลบุรีรัมย์) is the main hospital of Buriram Province, Thailand and is classified under the Ministry of Public Health as a regional hospital. It has a CPIRD Medical Education Center which trains doctors for the Institute of Medicine of Suranaree University of Technology and is an affiliated hospital of the Faculty of Medicine Ramathibodi Hospital, Mahidol University.

== History ==
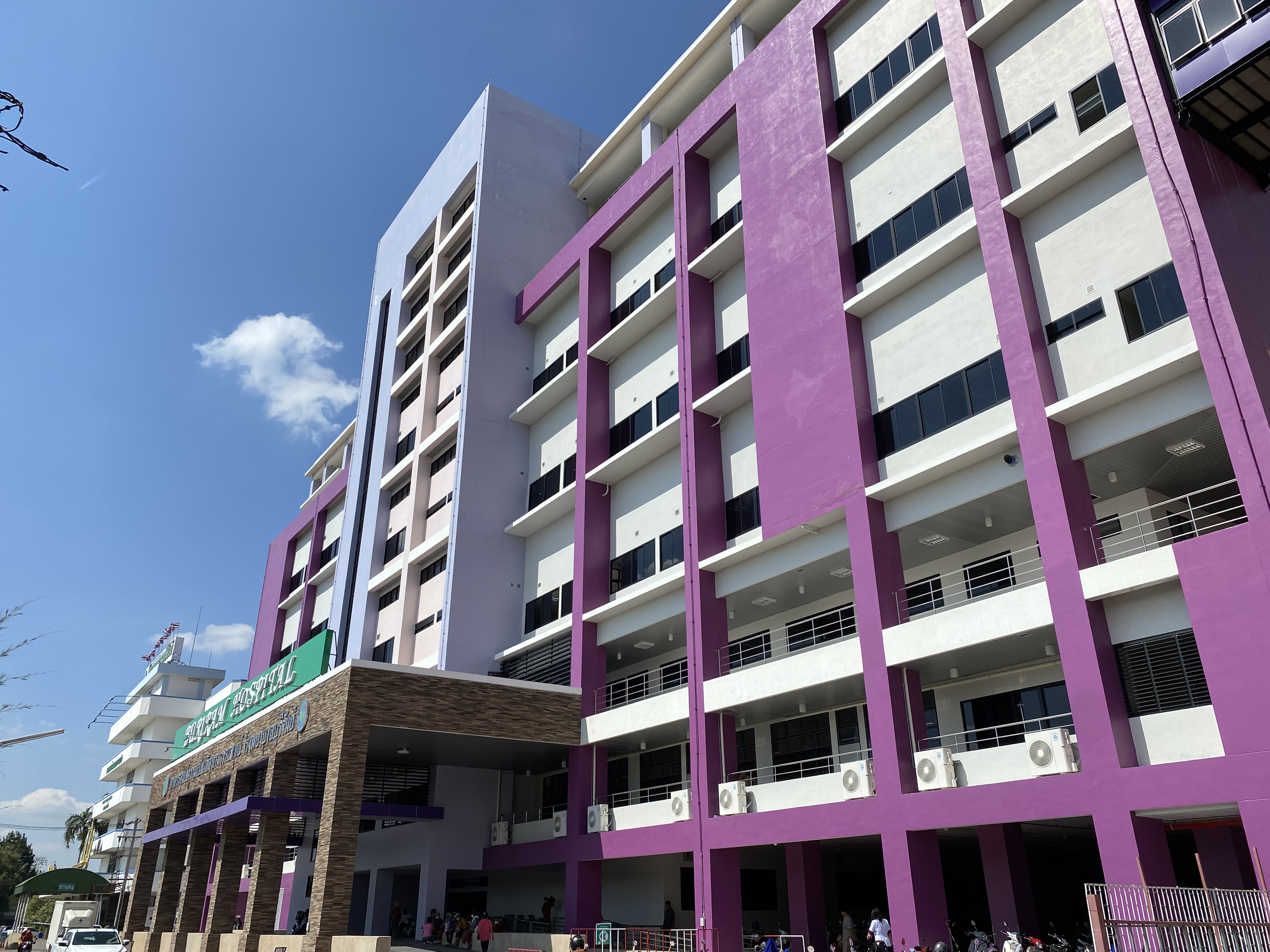
Excellent center building of Buriram Hospital

Buriram Hospital was first constructed in 1951 as one building with a capacity of 25 beds. It was officially opened on 10 March 1953. On 29 April 1997, the hospital became classified as a regional hospital and expanded to 520 beds. At the end of fiscal year 2000, the number of beds expanded to 590 and today the hospital has up to 895 beds in total.

== Gallery ==
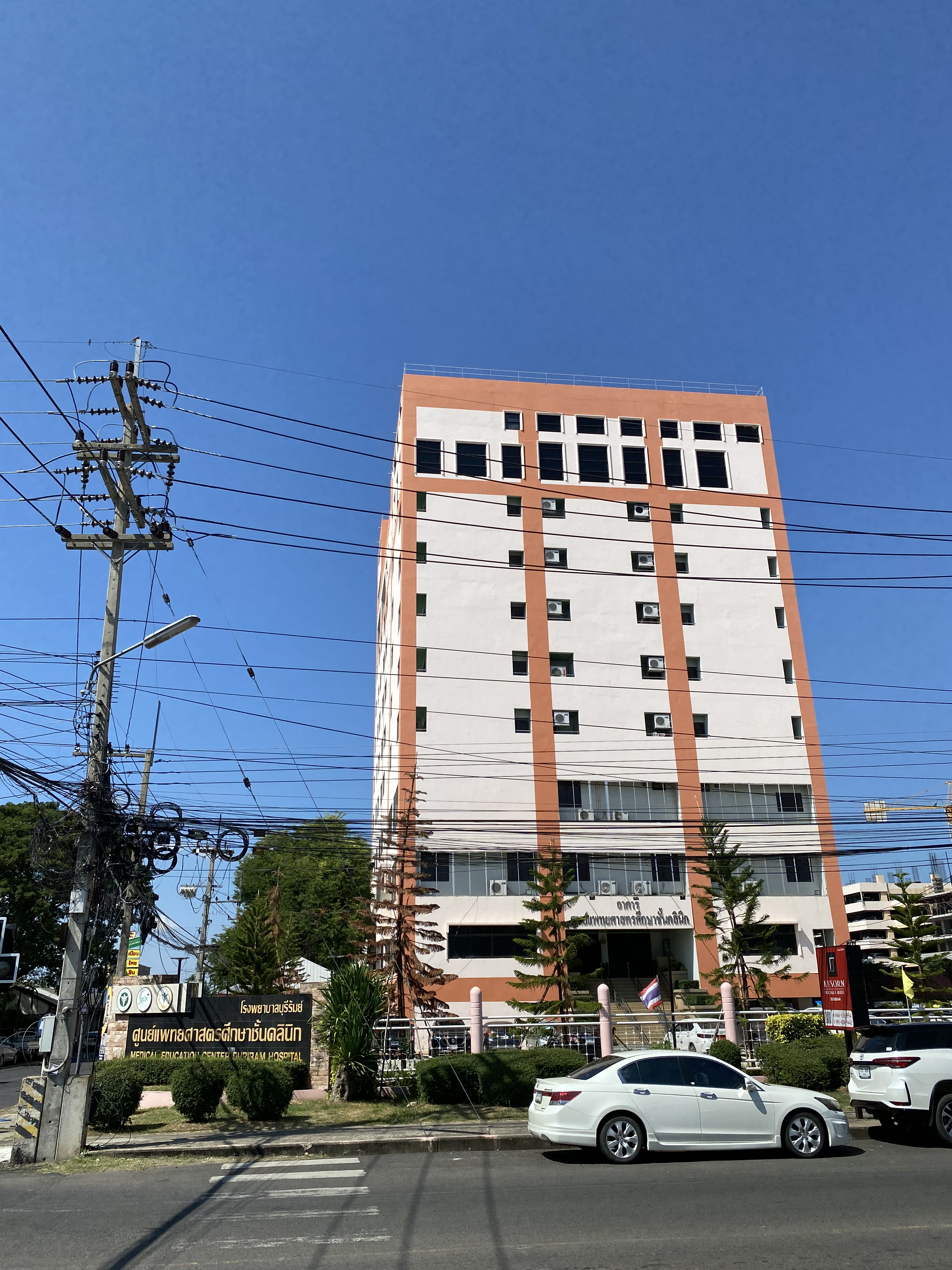
Medical education center building

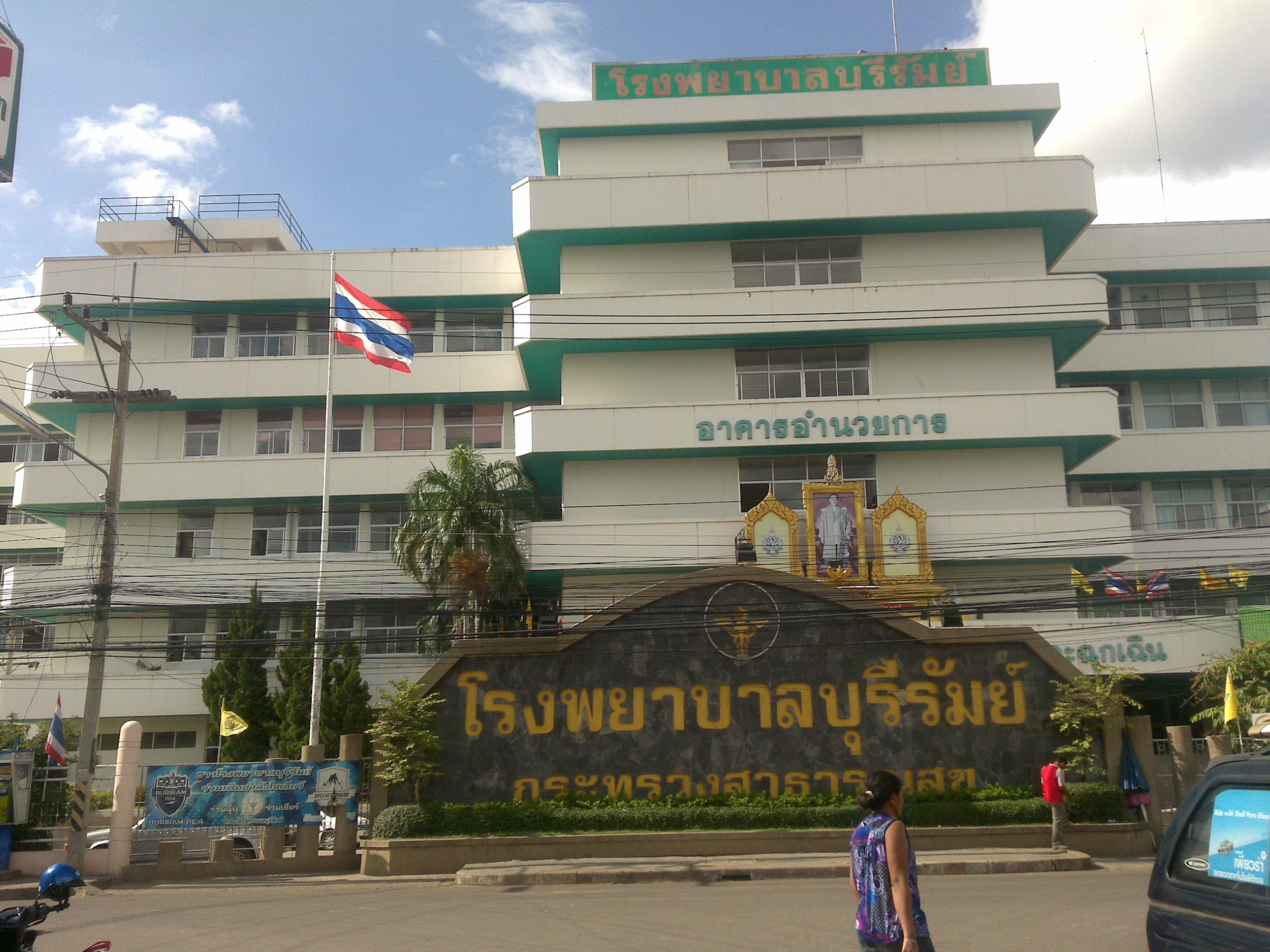
The old administrative building

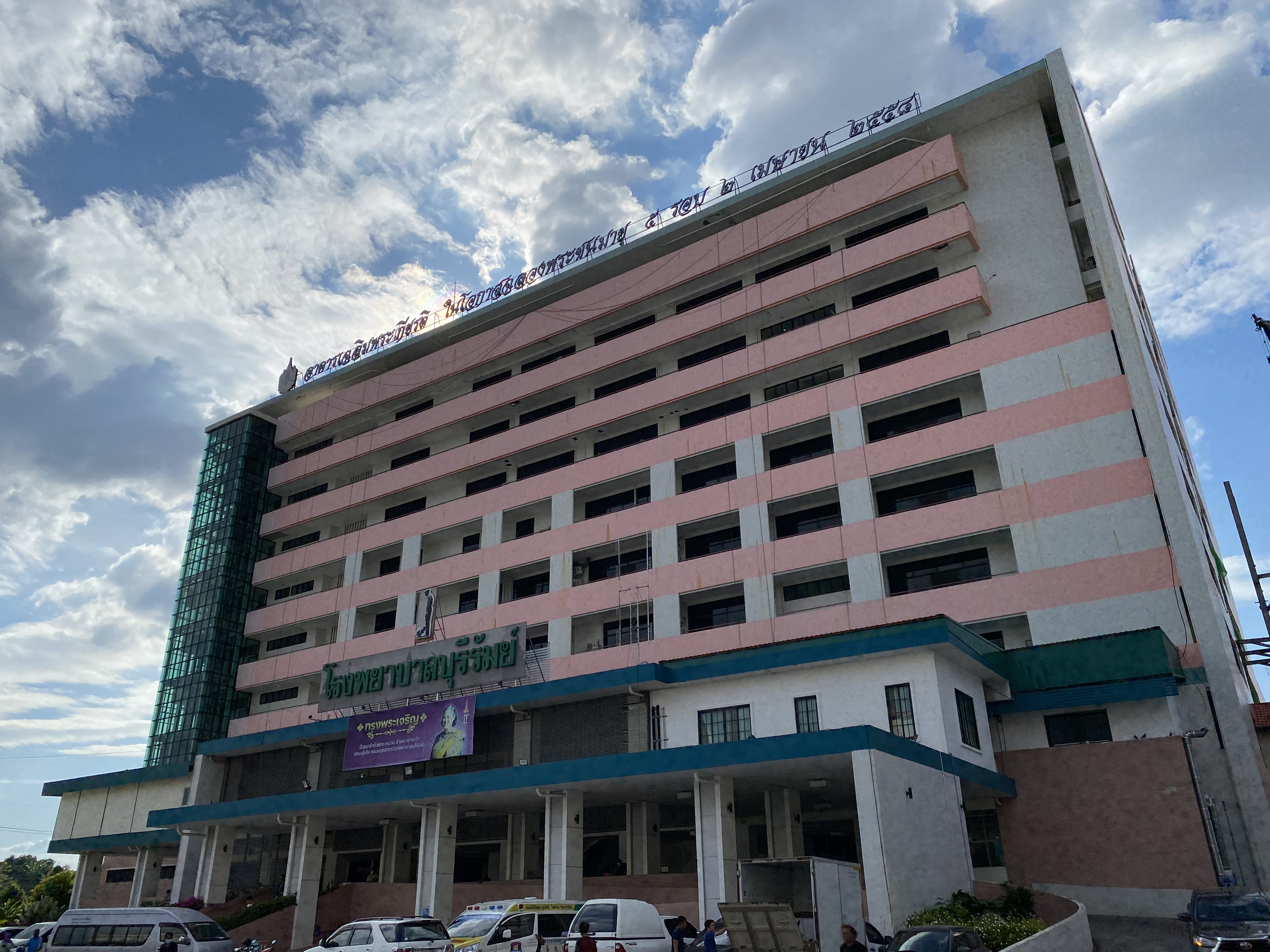
Five cycles (60 years) Birthday of Maha Chakri Sirindhorn, Princess Royal building

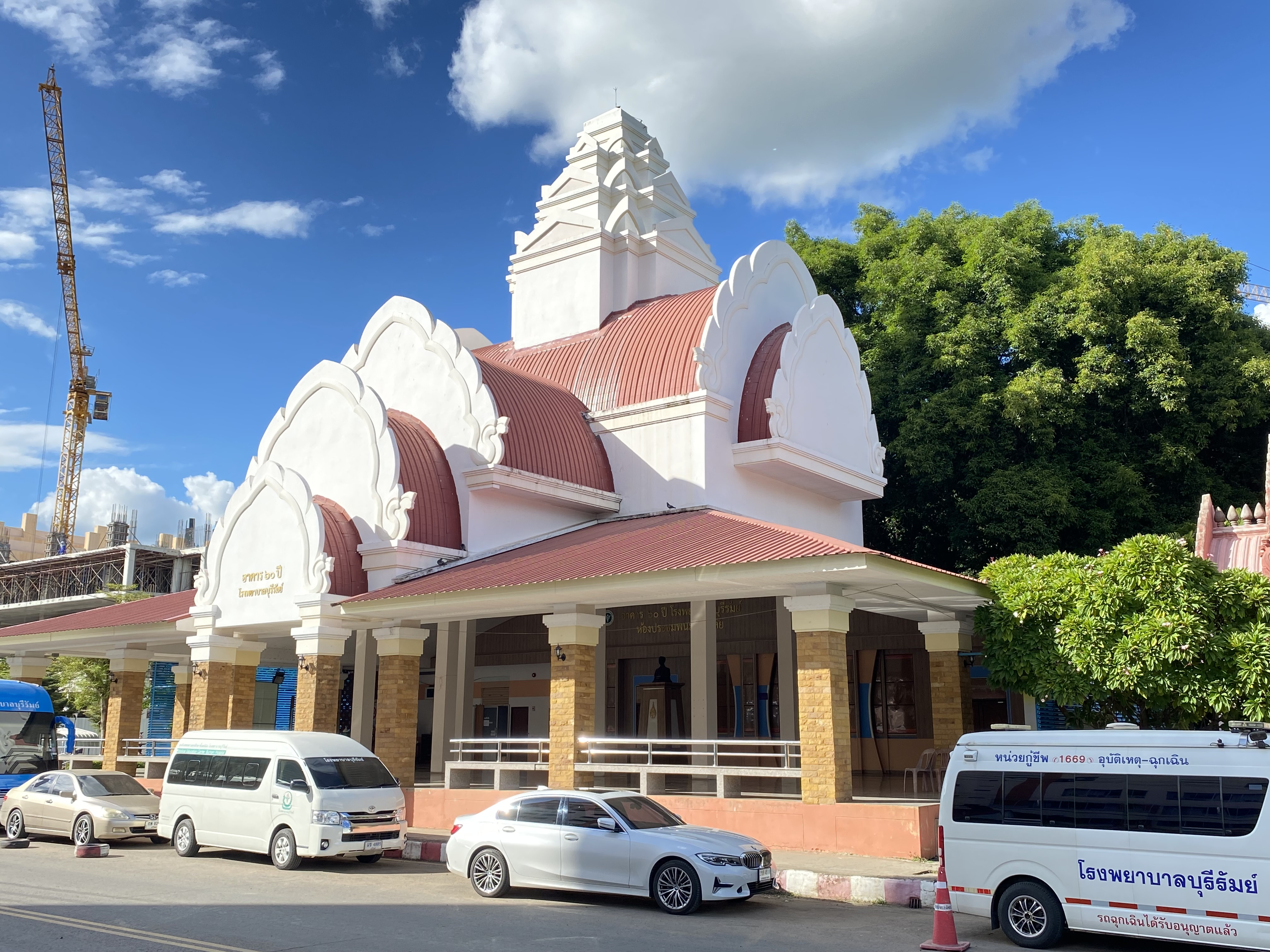
60th Anniversary Building

== See also ==
- Healthcare in Thailand
- Hospitals in Thailand
- List of hospitals in Thailand
