= Confédération africaine des travailleurs croyants (French West Africa and Togo) =

The Confédération africaine des travailleurs croyants ('African Confederation of Believing Workers', abbreviated C.A.T.C-A.O.F-Togo) was a trade union confederation in French West Africa and Togo. C.A.T.C-A.O.F-Togo was founded in Ouagadougou July 8–15, 1956 by the West African branches of the French trade union centre C.F.T.C. David Soumah became the first president of C.A.T.C-A.O.F-Togo.

== Profile ==
When adopting the name of the new, autonomous organization the word 'Christians' (used in the C.F.T.C name) was changed into the 'Believers', seeking to accommodate Muslim workers. However, C.A.T.C-A.O.F-Togo continued to be funded by the Catholic Church and became an affiliate of the International Federation of Christian Trade Unions.

== Organization ==
C.A.T.C-A.O.F-Togo had its headquarters in Dakar. The movement had its main strongholds in Togo, Dahomey and Upper Volta. C.A.T.C. was the dominant union movement in Upper Volta. Joseph Ouédraogo was the leader of the C.A.T.C branch in Upper Volta. Maurice Yaméogo, who later became the president of Upper Volta, had been active in C.A.T.C.

== Relations with U.G.T.A.N ==
C.A.T.C-A.O.F-Togo participated in the conference held in Cotonou on January 16, 1957, which founded the U.G.T.A.N trade union centre. C.A.T.C-A.O.F-Togo abstained from participating in the election to the provisional executive of U.G.T.A.N, claiming that they wished to confer with their member organizations on affiliation to the new pan-African organization. In the end C.A.T.C-A.O.F-Togo remained outside of U.G.T.A.N, as they wished to maintain their profile as a non-political union organization. Whilst U.G.T.A.N became the dominant force in the Francophone West African labour movement, with around 90% of the organized unions affiliated to it, C.A.T.C-A.O.F-Togo organized the majority of the non-U.G.T.A.N unions.

== U.P.T.C ==
In January 1959, C.A.T.C-A.O.F-Togo participated in the founding of a new regional organization, Union panafricaine des travailleurs croyants (U.P.T.C), chaired by the Congolese Gilbert Pongault. The C.A.T.C-A.O.F-Togo branches in French Soudan, Mauritania, Niger, Togo, Dahomey and Upper Volta became affiliated to U.P.T.C.

== Legacy ==
The Ivorian branch of C.A.T.C-A.O.F-Togo had separated from the regional organization, and became the Centre national des travailleurs croyants de Côte d'Ivoire. The former regional branch of C.A.T.C-A.O.F-Togo in Dahomey was dissolved on November 17, 1962, as the Dahomeyan government had opted for a one-party system. C.A.T.C-Togo later assumed the name Confédération togolaise des travailleurs croyants. The Upper Volta C.A.T.C would later become the Confédération nationale des travailleurs du Burkina.
