= Fédération des cheminots de l'A.O.F =

Trade union of France

Fédération des cheminots de l'A.O.F ('Railway Workers Federation of French West Africa') was a federation of trade union of railway workers in French West Africa. The federation consisted of four unions; Dakar-Niger, Conakry-Niger, Abidjan-Niger and Benin-Niger. Ibrahima Sarr was the general secretary of the federation. The federation was not affiliated to any trade union centre, but its constituent unions were free to affiliate themselves directly to a trade union centre. The Abidjan-Niger railway workers union of Ivory Coast was affiliated to CGT whilst the Benin-Niger railway workers union of Dahomey was affiliated to CFDT.
