= Civil Aviation Training Center =

Civil Aviation Training Center (CATC) is located in Iran and have bases in Tehran, Ahwaz, Mashhad, Shiraz, Esfahan and Tabriz.

Civil Aviation Training Center was established in 1982 under the aegis of International Civil Aviation Organization (ICAO) and United Nations Development Programme (UNDP), the Civil Aviation Training Center is a highly advanced Airport Operation maintenance facility. It provides its students in Private and commercial piloting and regular air service.
