= Pan-African Workers' Congress =

International confederation of trade unions

The Pan-African Workers' Congress was an international confederation of trade unions.

The organisation was founded in 1956, to bring together the African affiliates of the International Federation of Christian Trade Unions (IFCTU). It was initially known as the African Confederation of Believing Workers, then in 1959 became the Pan-African Union of Believing Workers. It was initially based in Brazzaville, then later moved its headquarters to Banjul. By 1966, it had fourteen affiliates, which claimed a total of 187,894 members. The federation was led by president David Soumah, and general secretary Gilbert Pongault.

In April 1973, the federation merged with the All-African Trade Union Federation and the African Trade Union Confederation, to form the Organisation of African Trade Union Unity.

In 1993, the IFCTU's successor, the World Confederation of Labour, established the Democratic Organization of African Workers' Trade Unions as new confederation of its African affiliates.

== Affiliates ==
The following federations were affiliated in 1965:

Union	Country
Lesotho Council of Workers	Basutoland
Christian Union of Burundi	Burundi
Union of Trade Unions of Believing Workers of the Cameroon	Cameroon
Union of Congolese Workers	Democratic Republic of the Congo
Dahomean Confederation of Believing Workers	Dahomey
Gambia Labour Union	Gambia
Christian Confederation of Malagasy Trade Unions	Madagascar
Mauritius Trades Union Congress	Mauritius
Nigeria Workers' Council	Nigeria
Workers' Union	Rwanda
National Confederation of Believing Workers	Senegal
Seychelles Christian Workers' Union	Seychelles
Togolese Confederation of Believing Workers	Togo
