= Confédération africaine des travailleurs croyants (Congo) =

Trade union centre in the Republic of the Congo

CATC
- Confédération Africaine des Travailleurs Croyants
- Headquarters: Brazzaville, Congo
- Location: Republic of the Congo
- Key people: M'Villa-Biyaoula Fulgence, president Mafoua Alain-David, permanent secretary
- Affiliations: ITUC

The Confédération Africaine des Travailleurs Croyants (CATC) is a trade union centre in Republic of the Congo.

The CATC is affiliated with the International Trade Union Confederation.
