= African Trade Union Confederation =

Confederation of trade unions in Africa

The African Trade Union Confederation (ATUC) was a confederation of trade unions in Africa.

The organisation was founded in January 1962 and was based in Dakar. It brought together federations of unions affiliated to the International Confederation of Free Trade Unions and those affiliated to the World Confederation of Labour, in addition to some unions with no other affiliations. The headquarters later moved to Lagos. On founding, its president was Ahmed Tlili, and its secretary was David Soumah. After Tlili's death, Lawrence Leo Borha was appointed as president.

By 1965, the organisation claimed 2.25 million members in 42 affiliates. In April 1973, it merged with the All-African Trade Union Federation and the Pan-African Workers' Congress, to form the Organisation of African Trade Union Unity.

== Affiliates ==
The following federations were affiliated in 1965:

Union	Country
General League of Angolan Workers in Exile	Angola
Union of Trade Unions of Believing Workers of the Cameroon	Cameroon
West Cameroon Trades Union Congress	Cameroon
Chadian Confederation of Labour	Chad
General Labour Federation of the Congo	Democratic Republic of the Congo
Confederation of Free Trade Unions of the Congo	Democratic Republic of the Congo
Union of Congolese Workers	Democratic Republic of the Congo
National Confederation of Free Labour Unions	Dahomey
Dahomean Confederation of Believing Workers	Dahomey
National Confederation of Gabonese Workers	Gabon
Gambia Workers' Union	Gambia
General Union of Workers of Guinea Bissau	Guinea Bissau
Congress of Industrial Organisations	Liberia
Confederation of Malgasy Workers	Madagascar
Christian Confederation of Malagasy Trade Unions	Madagascar
Trades Union Congress of Malawi	Malawi
Union of Workers of Mauritania	Mauritania
National Union of Workers of Niger	Niger
United Labour Congress	Nigeria
Nigeria Workers' Council	Nigeria
African Trade Union Congress	Rhodesia
National Union of Workers of Senegal	Senegal
National Confederation of Believing Workers of Senegal	Senegal
Somali Confederation of Labour	Somalia
Togolese Confederation of Believing Workers	Togo
General Federation of Tunisian Workers	Tunisia
Uganda Trades Union Congress	Uganda
Voltan Organisation of Free Trade Unions	Upper Volta
African Confederation of Believing Workers	Upper Volta
