= Suranaree University of Technology =

National public university in Nakhon Ratchasima Province, Thailand

Suranaree University of Technology (SUT)
- มหาวิทยาลัยเทคโนโลยีสุรนารี
- Motto: Upright, Civilized, Clean and Economical
- Type: Autonomous public research university
- Established: 27 July 1990
- Affiliations: Civil Aviation Training Center
- Rector: Assoc. Prof. Dr Anan Tongraar
- Royal conferrer: Maha Chakri Sirindhorn, Princess Royal of Thailand on behalf of the King
- Administrative staff: 1,097 (2013)
- Students: 17,303 (2020)
- Location: Nakhon Ratchasima, Thailand; 14.872917°N 102.0237°E
- Campus: Single Campus
- Tree: Mayodendron igneum (Peep Thong)
- Colours: Orange and gold
- Website: www.sut.ac.th

The Suranaree University of Technology (Thai: มหาวิทยาลัยเทคโนโลยีสุรนารี; SUT) is a national public university in Nakhon Ratchasima Province, Thailand. The university was established on 27 July 1990, becoming fully operational in 1993.

It is named after Thao Suranari, the local heroine of Nakhon Ratchasima. It is one of nine National Research Universities of Thailand.

Suranaree University of Technology has employed the trimester credit system since 1993 for more efficient use of time and to avoid the semester system summer session that usually is only half of the regular term in duration. The trimester system also enables students to take advantage of the cooperative education and career experience, so that they have sufficient time in the work site.

The university houses the Synchrotron Light Research Institute (SLRI), formerly the National Synchrotron Research Center (NSRC) enables advanced research on physics, materials science, and related areas.

== History ==
During the period of the Fifth National Economic and Social Development Plan, the Royal Thai Government wished that more opportunities in higher education be available in the regional and rural areas. Thus, in 1984, the Ministry of University Affairs (now the Office of the Higher Education Commission, a part of the Ministry of Education) proposed the establishment of five new regional universities: one in each of the North, South, and East; and two in the Northeast. In particular, the Ministry proposed colleges affiliated with Khon Kaen University at Ubon Ratchathani and another in Nakhon Ratchasima, both in the Northeast. The college at Nakhon Ratchasima was to be called Suranaree College, and was built on 1,120 hectares of degraded forest area near the Huay Ban Yang Reservoir, Muang Nakhon Ratchasima District, Nakhon Ratchasima Province.

On 27 July 1990, King Bhumibol Adulyadej signed the Suranaree University of Technology Founding Bill, effective July 30, 1990.

== Organization and academics ==
Suranaree University of Technology has grown to offer Undergraduate, Graduate and Post-doctoral among the eight (8) institutes that strongly reflect the university's academe. All Undergraduate, Graduate and Post-doctoral programs of Suranaree University of Technology have international program offering among its extensive curriculum.

Suranaree University of Technology
Science and Technology	Health Sciences	Social Sciences
Institute of Science	Institute of Medicine	Institute of Social Technology
Institute of Engineering	Institute of Nursing	
Institute of Agricultural	Institute of Dentistry	
	Institute of Public Health	

== Educational management ==
=== Center for Education Services ===
The Center for Education Services (abbreviated as CES) is the office of the university that handles student applications through the steps detailed. The education center was established with Suranaree University of Technology under the university's operations. Under the Suranaree University of Technology Act B.E. 2533 (1990), his majesty the king has signed the university act on July 27, 1990, and announced in the gazette, effective July 30, 1990.

=== Admissions ===
1. Round 1 Portfolio
2. Round 2 Quota
3. Round 3 Admission 1
4. Round 4 Admission 2
5. Round 5 Direct Admission
6. Apply for Scholarships
7. Transfer from Other Universities
8. Re-Entry

=== Trimester System ===
- Trimester 1 August - November
- Trimester 2 November - February
- Trimester 3 March - June

=== International programs ===
Suranaree University of Technology offers international programs at the Institute of Social Technology, Institute of Engineering, and Institute of Agricultural Technology.

The university offers scholarships and students aids for students who wish to apply the international programs. Most notable is the Royal Scholarship offered to young and deserving ASEAN students.

=== Centers of excellences and research organizations ===
The university's centers of excellences were set up to develop and strengthen faculty and researcher capacity, to increase research productivity in line with the direction of university research. The following are the university leading "centers of excellences":

- High Energy Physics and Astrophysics
- Agricultural Product Innovation
- Advanced Functional Materials
- Biomass
- Innovation for Sustainable Infrastructure Development
- Electromagnetic Wave Application
- Biomechanics Medicine
- Microbial Technology (for Agricultural Industry)
- Technology and Innovation (for Korat Chicken Business Development)
- Entrepreneurship

The university also houses several industry research organizations.

- Synchrotron Light Research Institute - established to develop the Siam Photon Source and Siam Photon Laboratory
- Regional Observatory for the Public, Nakhon Ratchasima - is one of the 5 ROPs in Thailand focused on astronomical learning.

== Campus ==
Suranaree University of Technology has developed the campus as a Residential University by developing learning centers within the student dormitory area and other areas that serve students efficiently and effectively. The university formulated a 10-year university development strategy for 2012-21 to support and create a positive and suitable environment for living within the university (Happy and Healthy Environment), strengthening and developing the university into Residential University, as well as developing dormitories as living and learning dormitory.

The university began construction of six student dormitories since fiscal year 1993, supporting first-generation undergraduate students. the number of undergraduate and postgraduate students increased in construction until the 2005 academic year. The dormitory is not enough to accommodate all students, and the differences in lifestyle in both study and maturity of postgraduate and undergraduate students are provided by the university, so all dormitories are provided to undergraduate students (from S1-S20), while postgraduate and postgraduate students are provided to stay at the Surasamanakkan Building.

== International collaboration ==
In 2020, SUT has collaborated with various international bodies and international institutions under agreements since1992. Presently SUT’s collaborative network has extended worldwide to 99 institutions. Furthermore, SUT signed MOUs with 16 institutions

MOU's
SUT Signed MOU (2020)	SUT Signed MOU (2018)
Université Grenoble Alpes	Fuzhou University
Institut National Supérieur des sciences agronomiques, del’alimentation et de l’envirnnement (Agrosup Dijon)	University of Michigan
Universitas Indonesia	The Maritime Silk Road Confucius Institute
Akita University	University of Wollongong
Research Center for Appropriate Technology Indonesian Institute of Sciences	Kobe University
Hokkaido University, Japan	Harbin Engineering University
Kyoto Institute of Technology	Tokyo University of Agriculture and Technology
Kyushu University	UMAP International Secretariat
University of Shizuoka	The University of Victoria
Yamaguchi University
The University of Malaya
Universiti Tunku Abdul Rahman
National Kaohsiung University of Hospitality and Tourism
Myddelton College
The University of Arizona
Vietnam National University Ho Chi Minh City - University of Science

International Memberships
Association of Southeast Asian Institutions of Higher Learning (ASAIHL)
Association of Universities of Asia and the Pacific (AUAP)
International Association of Universities (IAU)
World Association of Cooperative Education (WACE)
ASEAN-European Academic University Network (ASEA-UNINET)
The World Technology Universities Network (WTUN)
Asia Technological University Network (ATU-Net)
Southeast Asia and Taiwan Universities (SATU)

National Cooperation

SUT values its cooperation, collaboration and activities with organizations and bodies in Thailand.

in 2020, SUT signed 17 Memorandas of Agreement.

- Collaboration with Global Power Synergy PCL one research project and the development of a solar energy system
- Collaboration with Council of Science and Technology Professionals in the development of science and technology professional occupations
- Academic collaboration with Rajamangala University of Technology Isan Khonkaen Campus
- Academic collaboration with Big Tech Innovation Co., Ltd. and JSP Pharmaceutical Manufacturing (Thailand) PLC
- Academic collaboration with Rajamangala University of Technology Phra Nakhon
- Academic collaboration with JOBBKK Dot Com Recruitment Co., Ltd. in cooperative education management
- Academic collaboration with CPF Food Research & Development Center Co., Ltd.
- Academic collaboration with Gro Green Solutions Co., Ltd.
- Collaboration with Eiam Thongchai Industry Co., Ltd. in research and development
- Collaboration with Agricultural Research Development Agency (Public Organization) in research promotion
- Academic collaboration with AIDA Medical Co., Ltd. and The Foundation of Research and Education for Public
- Academic collaboration with Alpha Import Export (Thailand) Co., LTD.
- Academic collaboration with Surin Sugar Group Co., Ltd.
- Research collaboration with PS Nutrition Co., Ltd. in Food Technology and Related Fields for development of functional chicken meat
- Academic collaboration with Hitachi Consumer Products (Thailand) Co., Ltd.
- Academic collaboration: 4 research studies (Institute of Dentistry)
Places and Landmarks of SUT

== Rankings ==
SUT University Rankings
World University Rankings (2020)	World University Rankings (2020; by subject)	Asia University Ranking (2020)	QS University Ranking (Asia)	Round University Rankings
1000+ in the world	Physical Science: 601st - 800th in the world 5th in Thailand	301st-350th in Asia	261st-700th in the World	606th in the world
5th in Thailand	Engineering and Technology: 601st - 800th in the world 5th in Thailand		9th in Thailand	3rd in Thailand
1st in Science and Technology University in Thailand				

Ranking
National Ranking
Webometrics	10 (2012)	6 (2016)
Times	2 (2015)	
Nature Publishing Index	2 (2015)	
Nature Index	3 (2015)	
URAP	10 (2014-2015)	
Global
Webometrics	845 (2012)	822 (2016)
Times (World University Ranking)	601-800 (2015)	601-800 (2016) 161-170 (Asia, 2016)
Top Universities		251-300 (2016)
Times BRICS & Emerging Economics		159 (2016)
Greenmetric	52 (2015)	
