= Federation of Services (France) =

Trade union of France

The Federation of Services (French: Fédération des Services) is a trade union representing workers in a variety of industries in France, particularly office workers.

The union was founded in 1913, as the French Federation of Catholic Employees' Unions, under the presidency of Jules Zirnheld. In 1919, it became a founding affiliate of the French Confederation of Christian Workers (CFTC). It was banned during World War II, but was re-established after the war. In 1964, like the majority of the CFTC, it transferred to the new French Democratic Confederation of Labour, although a large minority around Jacques Tessier chose to remain with the CFTC.

In 1965, the union changed its name to the Federation of Services, Commerce and Credit, to better reflect the industries it covered. In 1971, it was joined by the Federation of Books, Paper and Cardboard, and became the Federation of General Services and Books. The printing industry section left again in 1983, and the union became the Federation of Services.

In 2005, the union's business services section left, to become part of the new Communication, Consulting, Culture Federation, while in 2007, the Federation of Clothing, Leather and Textile Industries merged in. In 2011, the insurance section left, to join the Federation of Banks and Insurance. By 2017, the union was the second largest affiliate of the CFDT, with 81,094 members.

The union is divided into three sections:

- Trade, clothing, leather and textiles
- Hotels, tourism and catering
- Business and personnel services

== General Secretaries ==
1913: Charles Viennet
1914: Gaston Tessier
1919:
1938: Jacques Tessier
1953:
1956: Guy Sulter
1967: Hubert Lesire-Ogrel
1973:
1984: Marguerite Bertrand
1990:
1990s: Rémi Jouan
1990s: Didier Broulé
2006: Gilles Desbordes
2019: Olivier Guivarch
