= Federation of Health and Social Services =

Trade union of France

The Federation of Health and Social Services (French: Fédération des services de santé et services sociaux, Santé Sociaux) is a trade union representing

The union was founded in 1935, as the Federation of Professional Syndicates of Hospital and Social Services, and affiliated to the French Confederation of Christian Workers (CFTC). The union was banned during World War II, but was reconstituted after the war. In 1964, the union, like the majority of the CFTC, it transferred to the new French Democratic Confederation of Labour.

By 1995, the union claimed 60,000 members, and was the largest affiliate of the CFDT. Its leader from 1996 until 2001 was François Chérèque, who went on to become the general secretary of the CFDT.

By 2017, the union's membership had grown to 93,570.

== General Secretaries ==
1964: Poinseau
1967: Marie-Jeanne Lafont
1973: Daniel Desmé
1977:
1996: François Chérèque
2001:
2017: Évelyne Rescanières
