= FIIG =

FIIG may stand for:

- FIIG Securities, an Australian investment firm
- International Federation for the Graphical Industries, a former global union federation
