= Gaston Tessier =

French trade unionist and Resistance member

Aimé Auguste Tessier, known as Gaston Tessier (15 June 1887 – 8 August 1960) was a French trade unionist and Resistance member.

== Biography ==
Born in Paris, Tessier attended a Christian Brothers' school. In 1905, he joined the Trade and Industry Employees' Union (SECI), a union of Catholic workers, his membership sponsored by Jules Zirnheld and Charles Viennet. He became prominent in the union's Study Group, which conducted research into labour-related matters from a Catholic perspective, and he wrote regularly for L'Employé, the union's journal. In 1908, he was appointed as assistant general secretary of the union, then in 1912, he became general secretary of a new union of Christian workers in the Paris region.

As leader of the union, Tessier took a prominent role in founding the French Federation of Catholic Employees' Unions, in 1913, and he was soon also appointed as its general secretary. Due to poor health, he remained in his union posts during World War I, supplementing his income by opening a bookshop.

In 1919, the French Confederation of Christian Workers (CFTC) was established, and Tessier was appointed as its general secretary. He also became active internationally, serving as the founding general secretary of the International Federation of Christian Employees' Trade Unions from 1921. He worked with Jules Zirnheld to gain the blessing of the Vatican for their union activities, and refute accusations that they were Marxists, later being made a knight of the Order of St Gregory the Great. In 1936, he was also made a knight of the Legion of Honour.

The CFTC was banned in 1939, along with other trade unions, Tessier was one of three CFTC signatories to the Manifesto of the Twelve, opposing this. He was a founder of Liberation-Nord, wrote for underground newspapers, and from 1943 served on the National Resistance Council, then on the Provisional Consultative Assembly. Immediately after the liberation of France, he chaired the Ministerial Commission for Food Supply.

The CFTC was re-established, and Tessier returned to his post as general secretary, then in 1948, he moved to become its president. In this role, he promoted Christian trade unionism internationally, and strongly opposed the growing support in the CFTC for secularisation. In 1953, he feared that this might lead to him losing re-election as the federation's president, so he stood down, becoming honorary president, and also president of the International Federation of Christian Trade Unions.

Trade union offices
Preceded by New position	General Secretary of the French Confederation of Christian Workers; 1919–1948	Succeeded by Maurice Bouladoux
Preceded by Georges Torcq	President of the French Confederation of Christian Workers; 1948–1953	Succeeded by Maurice Bouladoux
Preceded by Jules Zirnheld	President of the International Federation of Christian Trade Unions; 1953–1960	Succeeded by Maurice Bouladoux
