= Exupérien Mas =

Venerable Brother Exupérien Mas, F.S.C.

Religious
- Born: Adrien Mas; 7 June 1829; Poujols, Hérault, France
- Residence: Paris, France
- Died: 31 January 1905
- Venerated in: Roman Catholic Church (Brothers of the Christian Schools & French Confederation of Christian Workers)
- Major shrine: Notre Dame des Retraites, Athis-Mons, Essonne, France

Exupérien Mas, F.S.C. (7 June 1829 – 31 January 1905), was a French member of the Brothers of the Christian Schools. He was an educator, spiritual guide and social activist. The cause for his canonization has been accepted by the Holy See and is currently being studied.

== Life ==
He was born Adrien Mas in Poujols, Hérault, France. At the age of 10 he was enrolled in a boarding school in Beziers run by the Brothers of the Christian Schools, and became an outstanding student at the school. He felt called to follow their way of life and, despite the opposition of his parents, entered the Brothers' novitiate in Toulouse. He received the religious habit on 8 December 1847, at which time he was given the religious name of Brother Exupérien.

Following his novitiate year, Brother Mas was sent to teach at his old school. There he was a successful teacher, as well as a spiritual guide to the students. He felt drawn to the Marian spirituality then spreading through France, from which he developed a commitment to the spiritual development of the nation. After a time, he was named the Brother Director of the school. Despite these responsibilities, he gained a reputation among both the Brothers and the students of being a saintly man.

In January 1859 he was chosen as a Councilor to the Superior General of the Institute, for which he was transferred to the motherhouse in Paris. He was also appointed as Director of Formation for the Institute and Master of novices. During this, his last post which lasted 32 years, he accomplished remarkable apostolic work among his fellow members of the Institute. He established the practice of a monthly spiritual retreat, intended to revive the spiritual life of the Brothers on a regular basis, at Notre-Dame des Retraites, a center he established in the Parisian suburb of Athis-Mons. He also introduced the nine-month long second novitiate, as a form of sabbatical. He founded the St. Benedict Labre Association with the aim of leading young men to live an authentic Christian life, who would also meet there.

During the Franco-Prussian War of 1870, the novitiate was closed and Mas was appointed to direct an ambulance corps assigned to the care of the Brothers. He himself nursed many of the wounded and helped those beyond help to die peacefully. During the revolt of the Paris Commune immediately after that war, he and his Brothers were imprisoned in the Mazas Prison. He was the one who kept up their spirits during this time of trial. Upon their release he re-opened the novitiate.

Mas was elected the Assistant Superior General in 1873. When the French government expelled all members of religious institutes from French public schools in 1880, his commitment to education was so great that he led the establishment of many religious schools, which were run free of charge.

Mas helped to found and guided the first Trade Union of Employees of Industry and Commerce, in order to safeguard the material and spiritual interests of its members. This organization later became the French Confederation of Christian Workers.

In October 1903 Mas was involved in a traffic accident which left him paralyzed for three months. Soon after this, on 7 July 1904, the French government passed an anti-clerical law suppressing all teaching Orders in France. He worked to salvage the work of the Brothers as best he could.

A second traffic accident in October 1904 again left Mas badly injured. He died in the infirmary of the motherhouse the following January.

== Veneration ==
At the Brothers' request, the cause for Mas' beatification was begun in the 1950s by the Roman Catholic Archdiocese of Paris and soon received the approval of the Holy See. The decree on the validity of the process was promulgated on April 6, 1979. Pope John Paul II approved a decree declaring his virtues to be of a heroic level on 3 March 1990, thereby granting him the title of Venerable. Originally buried at the Brothers' cemetery in Paris, his remains were transferred on 11 June 1949 to the chapel of the retreat center he had established in Athis-Mons.
