= Private Training and Education Federation =

Trade union of France

The Private Training and Education Federation (French: Fédération formation et enseignement privés, FEP) is a trade union representing workers in the education sector who are not public employees, in France.

The union was founded on 8 May 1938, at a meeting in Lyon, as the Federation of Free Education. It affiliated to the French Confederation of Christian Workers (CFTC), but achieved little before trade unions were banned during World War II. In 1945, it was reactivated, and it grew steadily. In 1964, it joined the majority of the CFTC in transferring to the new French Democratic Confederation of Labour, becoming the Private Education Federation.

By 1995, the union claimed 13,200 members.
