= World Federation of Industry Workers =

The World Federation of Industry Workers (WFIW) was a global union federation representing workers in a range of primary and secondary industries.

The federation was formed on 14 October 1985, when the International Federation of Christian Miners' Unions merged with the International Federation for the Graphical Industries, the World Federation of Energy, Chemical and Various Industry Workers' Unions, and the World Federation for the Metallurgic Industry. Like all its predecessors, the union affiliated to the World Confederation of Labour (WCL).

In 2004, the federation began discussing a merger with the International Federation of Chemical, Energy, Mine and General Workers' Unions (ICEM), an affiliate of the International Confederation of Free Trade Unions (ICFTU). The WCL merged with the ICFTU in 2007, and the WFTW finalised its merger into ICEM in 2007.

== General Secretaries ==
1985: Jos Vandecruys
c.1988: Ernesto Molano
1998: Fons van Genechten
2002: Italo Rodomonti

== Presidents ==
1998: Doekle Terpstra
1999: Jaap Wienen
2002: Bart Bruggeman
