= World Federation of Agriculture and Food Workers =

- Fédération mondiale des travailleurs de l'agriculture et de l'alimentation
- Founded: December 1982; 43 years ago
- Dissolved: 2006; 20 years ago
- Headquarters: 31 rue de Treves, Brussels
- Location: International
- Affiliations: World Confederation of Labour
- Website: www.cmt-wcl.org/femtaa

The World Federation of Agriculture and Food Workers (French: Fédération mondiale des travailleurs de l'agriculture et de l'alimentation, FEMTAA) was an International Trade Federation affiliated to the World Confederation of Labour (WCL).

== History ==
The federation was established in December 1982 at a meeting in Bogotá, when the World Federation of Agricultural Workers merged with the World Federation of Workers in Food, Tobacco and Hotel Industries. Originally named the "World Federation of Agriculture and Food Workers", it later changed its official name to the World Federation of Agriculture, Food, Hotel and Allied Workers, but its older name remained in common use, and it retained its FEMTAA acronym.

In 2006, the WCL merged into the new International Trade Union Confederation, and FEMTAA dissolved, its former affiliates mostly joining the International Union of Food, Agricultural, Hotel, Restaurant, Catering, Tobacco and Allied Workers' Associations.

The federation had three regional affiliates, the Pan-African Federation of Agricultural and Food Workers, the Federation of Agricultural Workers in Latin America, and the Asian Professional Federation of Mixed Industries.

== General Secretaries ==
1996: José Gómez Cerda
2004: Timothee T. Boko
