= CFDT Finance Federation =

Trade union of France

The CFDT Finance Federation (French: Fédération des finances CFDT, CFDT Finances) is a French trade union representing civil servants working in ministries related to finance, and in organisations under the ministries' control.

The federation originated as part of the French Confederation of Christian Workers (CFTC). In 1964, along with the majority of the CFTC, it transferred to the new French Democratic Confederation of Labour (CFDT). By 1995, the union claimed 11,300 members.

== General Secretaries ==
1952: René Routhier
1970: Louis Thémelin
1976:
1990s: Philippe Le Clezio
2000s: Damien Leroux
2010s: Denis Grégoire
