= World Federation of Workers in Food, Drink, Tobacco and Hotel Industries =

Global union federation

The World Federation of Workers in Food, Drink, Tobacco and Hotel Industries (French: Fédération mondiale de travailleurs des industries alimentaires, du tabac et hôtelière, FMATH) was a global union federation bringing together unions representing workers in food and service industries.

== History ==
The federation was established on 10 October 1948 at a meeting in Marche-en-Famenne. Initially named the International Christian Federation of Food, Drink, Tobacco and Hotel Workers, the federation was a merger of the International Federation of Christian Trade Unions of Workers in the Food and Drink Trades, the International Federation of Christian Tobacco Workers, and a federation of Christian hotel workers. Like its predecessors, it affiliated to the International Federation of Christian Trade Unions.

By 1979, the federation's affiliates claimed a total of 250,000 members. In 1982, it merged with the World Federation of Agricultural Workers, to form the World Federation of Agriculture and Food Workers.

== Affiliates ==
The following unions were affiliated in 1979:

Union	Country	Membership
Sindicato de los Trabajadores de la Industria Lechera	Argentina	
Christian Fraction of the Hotel and Restaurant Workers' Union	Austria	800
Christian Fraction of the Union of Workers in Food and Allied Industries	Austria	4,000
Christian Union of Workers in Food, Tobacco and Hotels	Belgium	55,000
Confédération des syndicats nationaux	Canada	9,000
Sindicato de Trabajadores de la Industria de Hongos	Costa Rica	
Federacion Nacional de Trabajadores de la Cana	Dominican Republic	
ALEB	West Germany	
Sindicato de Trabajadores de Traborcalera Centro Americana SA	Guatemala	
Federacion Hondurena de Trabajadores de la Alimentacion	Honduras	
Indian Federation of Workers in Food, Tobacco and Catering Industries	India	18,008
Cigarette and Tobacco Union	Indonesia	105,246
Luxembourg Confederation of Christian Trade Unions	Luxembourg	450
Montserrat Allied Workers Union	Montserrat	
Catholic Union of Agriculture, Food and Tobacco	Netherlands	11,727
Food Union	Netherlands	8,000
Industrial Workers' Union CNV	Netherlands	3,186
Industrial Workers' Union NKV	Netherlands	8,300
Federacion de Trahadornan di Aruba	Netherlands Antilles	
Bond Trahadornan HORECAF	Netherlands Antilles	
Sindicato de Trabajadores de la Industria Aceitera de Managera	Nicaragua	
Federation of Hotel, Food, Drink and Catering Workers' Unions of Nigeria	Nigeria	
Federacion Nacional de Trabajadores del Comercio y Alimentacion	Panama	
Federacion Nacional de Trabajadores Comerciantes en Marcadors y Anexos	Peru	
Union de Trabajadores de Galletas Sultana	Puerto Rico	
Rhodesia Catering and Hotelworkers' Union	Rhodesia	9,000
Working People's Union	St Kitts	
Hotels, Catering and Entertainment Workers' Union	Sierra Leone	1,400
Christian Transport, Commerce and Food Workers' Union	Switzerland	800
Federacion Nacional de Trabajadores de la Alimentacion	Venezuela	
