= World Federation of Energy, Chemical and Various Industry Workers' Unions =

The World Federation of Energy, Chemical and Various Industry Workers' Unions (French: Fédération mondiale des syndicats de l'énergie, de la chimie et des industries diverses, ECI) was a global union federation bringing together unions representing workers in a variety of industries.

The federation was founded in 1920 in Cologne, as the International Federation of Christian Factory and Transport Workers' Unions. It set up headquarters in The Hague, and affiliated to the International Federation of Christian Trade Unions. By 1935, it had affiliates in Austria, Belgium, Czechoslovakia, France, Hungary, the Netherlands, Switzerland, and Yugoslavia, and by 1958, it had 16 affiliates, with a total of 210,000 members. While the International Federation of Trade Unions of Transport Workers represented land transport workers, it long represented seafarers, in a dedicated section.

The union was renamed as the "World Federation of Energy, Chemical and Various Industry Workers' Unions" in about 1970, recognising the importance of the energy and chemical industries among its member unions. By 1979, it had affiliated members.

On 14 October 1985, the union merged with the International Federation for the Graphical Industries, the International Federation of Christian Miners' Unions, and the World Federation for the Metallurgic Industry, forming the World Federation of Industry Workers.
