= CFTC =

CFTC may refer to:

- Commodity Futures Trading Commission, an American federal agency that regulates U.S. derivatives markets
- Confédération Française des Travailleurs Chrétiens (French Confederation of Christian Workers), a major French confederation of trade unions
- Commonwealth Fund for Technical Cooperation, a Commonwealth of Nations programme
