= National Federation of Construction and Wood Workers =

Trade union in France

The National Federation of Construction and Wood Workers (French: Fédération Nationale Construction et Bois, FNCB) is a trade union representing workers in the construction and wood working industries in France.

== History ==
The union was founded on 19 May 1934, as the French Federation of Building, Wood, Public Works and Kindred Trades. It affiliated to the French Confederation of Christian Workers (CFTC). In 1964, along with the majority of the CFTC, it became a secular union, and affiliated to the new French Democratic Confederation of Labour (CFDT), and in 1966 it adopted its current name.

== Membership ==
By 1995, the union claimed 14,700 members, and by 2017, this had increased to 24,952.
