= Democratic Organization of African Workers' Trade Unions =

African regional organisation

DOAWTU/ODSTA
- Democratic Organization of African Workers' Trade Unions
- Organisation Démocratique Syndicale des Travailleurs Africains
- Merged into: African Regional Organisation of the International Trade Union Confederation
- Founded: February 22, 1993
- Dissolved: 2007
- Headquarters: Lomé, Togo
- Location: Africa
- Members: 35 unions in 29 Countries
- Key people: Toolsyraj Benedyn, president Akouete B. Adrien, general secretary
- Affiliations: World Confederation of Labour
- Website: www.odsta.org

The Democratic Organization of African Workers' Trade Unions (DOAWTU) was a regional organisation of the World Confederation of Labour (WCL).

The WCL's first regional organisation in Africa was the Pan-African Workers' Congress, founded in 1956, which merged into the Organisation of African Trade Union Unity in 1973.

The DOAWTU was founded in 1993, with headquarters in Lomé. By 2005, it had a membership of 35 unions in 29 countries, and supported eight industrial federations. In 2007, the federation merged with the ICFTU African Regional Organisation, forming the African Regional Organisation of the International Trade Union Confederation.

== Pan-African federations ==
The eight Pan-African industrial federations were:

- Fédération Panafricaine des Travailleurs de l’Industrie (FPTI)
- Fédération Panafricaine des Syndicats des Services Publics (FPSSP)
- Fédération Panafricaine des Travailleurs de l’Agriculture et de l’Alimentation (FEPATAA)
- Fédération Panafricaine des Syndicats de l’Education (FEPASE)
- Fédération Panafricaine des Employés (FPE)
- Fédération Panafricaine des Travailleurs du Transport (FPTT)
- Fédération Panafricaine des Travailleurs du Textile et de l'Habillement (FPTTH)
- Fédération Panafricaine des travailleurs de la Construction et du Bois (FPTCB)

== Leadership ==
=== Presidents ===
1995: Fernand Kikongi
2003: Toolsyraj Benedyn

=== General Secretaries ===
1993: Eugene Akpemado
1990s: Adrien Akouété
