= Federation of Banks and Insurance =

Trade union of France

The Federation of Banks and Insurance (French: Fédération Banques et Assurances, FBA) is a trade union representing workers in the finance sector in France.

The union originated in 1954, when the French Confederation of Christian Workers (CFTC) created the Federation of Unions of Banks, Financial Institutions and Savings Banks, its name gradually shortened to become the Federation of Banks. In 1964, like the majority of the CFTC, it transferred to the new French Democratic Confederation of Labour (CFDT).

By 1995, the union claimed 22,100 members. In 2004, a series of disagreements, particularly over pension reform, led many members to leave the union. No longer able to form a quorum for its operations, the union was placed under provisional administration by the CFDT. This lasted until the 2005 congress, when a new federal council was elected.

In 2011, the union absorbed the insurance branch of the Federation of Services, becoming the "Federation of Banks and Insurance", and claiming to be the largest union in the finance sector in France.

== General Secretaries ==
1954: Jean-Marie Vivicorsi
1956: Édouard Descamps
1972: Georges Bégot
1979: Jean-Pierre Moussy
1984:
2005: Véronique Descacq
2011: Luc Mathieu
