= Federation of State Establishments and Arsenals =

Trade union of France

The Federation of State Establishments and Arsenals (French: Federation des etablissements et arsenaux de l'etat, FEAE) is a trade union representing workers in the defence sector in France.

The union was founded in 1962, when the French Confederation of Christian Workers (CFTC) merged its Air-War Federation and its Marine Federation, forming the Air-War-Marine Federation. Marcel Gonin became its first general secretary, and campaigned strongly for the CFTC to become secular. As a result, in 1964, when the majority of the CFTC formed the French Democratic Confederation of Labour (CFDT), the union transferred to the new confederation. However, almost half the members of the airforce and military section chose to remain with the CFTC.

Within the CFDT, the union was initially known as the Federation of Union of Civil Defence Personnel. In 1965, it was restructured and adopted its present name. By 1995, the union claimed 12,500 members.

== Presidents ==
1962: Marcel Gonin
1964: Robert Jacquet
1975: Henri Berry
1995: Jean-Pierre Le Velly
2010s: Sophie Morin
