= Laurent Berger =

French trade unionist, chairman of the French Democratic Confederation of Labour

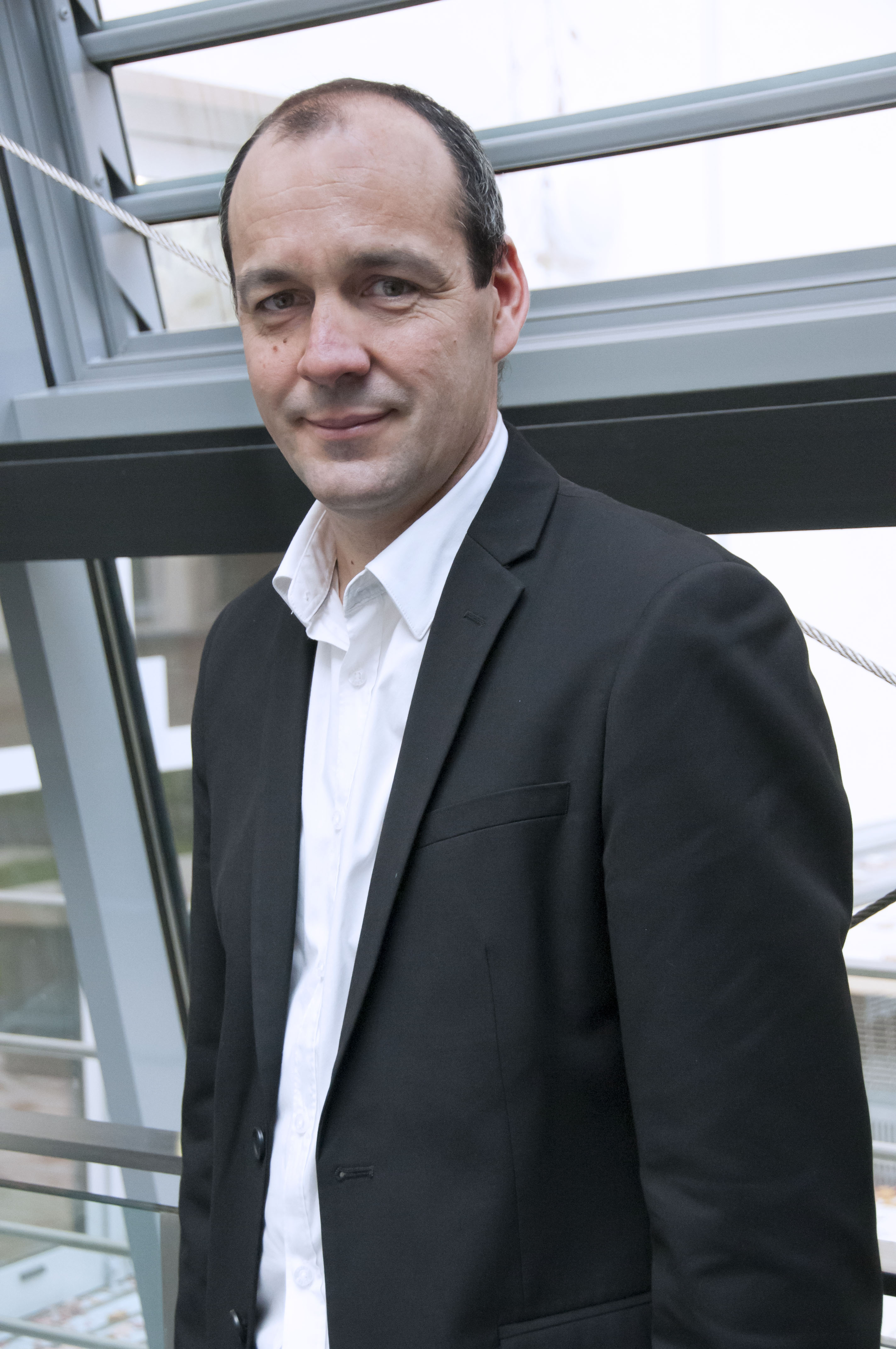
- Berger in 2012

Chairman of the European Trade Union Confederation
- In office May 2019 – May 2023
- Preceded by: Rudy De Leeuw
- Succeeded by: Wolfgang Katzian

General secretary of the French Democratic Confederation of Labour (CFDT)
- In office 28 November 2012 – 21 June 2023
- Preceded by: François Chérèque
- Succeeded by: Marylise Léon

General secretary of the Young Christian Workers (YCW)
- In office 1992–1994

Personal details
- Born: 27 October 1968 (age 57) Guérande, Loire-Atlantique, France
- Education: University of Nantes

Laurent Berger (born 27 October 1968) is a French labor leader. He has been the general secretary of the French Democratic Confederation of Labour (CFDT) between 2012 and 2023.

== Life ==
=== Youth ===
Berger is the son of a worker of the Chantiers de l'Atlantique and of a child care assistant.

During his studies, Berger was a supervisor in a high school. He joined the French Democratic Confederation of Labour at that time. After he earned a master's degree in history from University of Nantes, he became a permanent staff member of the Young Christian Workers (YCW) in 1991. He was the general secretary of the YCW from 1992 to 1994.

He was subsequently unemployed for six months and was intermittently a substitute teacher of history and geography.

Berger was employed by a social insertion association in Saint-Nazaire to help long-term unemployed adults and RMI beneficiaries to find jobs. There, he created a CFDT section and became the staff representative of this association of nine employees.

=== Union action ===
In 1996, Berger became a permanent staff member of the Saint-Nazaire CFDT local union. He worked on employment and youth issues within the trade union.

In 2003, he was elected general secretary of the CFDT regional union of Pays de la Loire and joined the CFDT national office.

On 17 June 2009 he was elected to the Confederal Executive Commission, the leading body of the CFDT, where he was in charge of small business files. After 2010, he was in charge of employment issues, securing career and integration paths. In this respect, he was the CFDT negotiator to state unemployment insurance and to youth employment.

Berger was appointed as the deputy general secretary of CFDT on 21 March 2012.

He was the head of a reflection on the functioning of the CFDT, aimed at bringing the union closer to employees.

After François Chérèque's resignation, Berger was elected as the general secretary by the CFDT national office on 28 November 2012. He was re-elected with 98.31 percent of votes on 5 March 2014 during a CFDT congress in Marseille.

In 2016, Berger supported the Socialist government's labour law reform bill, in contrast with the FO and CGT unions.

In June 2018, Berger was re-elected as the general secretary of the CFDT with more than 90 percent of votes. Under Berger's chairmanship, the CFDT became the largest trade union at union elections in the private sector (2017) but remained the second one at the elections in the Civil Service (2018). On 11 December 2018 Berger tweeted that the CFDT had become the first trade union in France, overtaking the General Confederation of Labour (CGT).

Berger has been the chairman of the European Trade Union Confederation since May 2019.

== Opinion on the National Front ==
In an interview with Francis Brochet for regional press group EBRA in the aftermath of the 2014 European Parliament election favourable towards the National Front, Laurent Berger stated: "For me, the National Front is always too high: this party (I am not talking about its voters) is a stain on democracy. We have the choice between an authoritarian society that will be into the 'We just have to' and look for a scapegoat, and a more appeased society of dialogue and listening. It is more complicated, but it will always be my choice."

In April 2017, during the 2017 French presidential election, Berger announced he had "clearly taken a stance against Marine Le Pen and published arguments for [CFDT's] militants", even if he did not give any voting instructions.

== Publications ==
- Laurent Berger, Claude Sérillon, Syndiquez-vous, Le Cherche midi, 2019 ISBN 978-2-7491-6249-2
- Laurent Berger, dialogue with Denis Lafay, Au boulot ! Manifeste pour le travail, Éditions de l'Aube, 2018 ISBN 978-2-815928-01-4
- Laurent Berger, Pascal Canfin, interviews with Philippe Frémeaux, Réinventer le progrès, Les Petits Matins, 2016 ISBN 978-2363832146
- Laurent Berger, Permis de construire, Tallandier, 2015 ISBN 979-1021016460
