= Josef Scherrer =

Swiss politician (1891–1965)

Josef Scherrer (22 March 1891 – 17 June 1965) was a Swiss trade union leader and politician.

Born in Wittenbach, Scherrer completed an apprenticeship, then worked in the textile industry. In 1910, he became secretary of the Swiss Christian Textile Workers' Union. He also joined the Christian Social Party (CSP), and in 1911 became its president in St. Gallen. In 1916, he became the secretary of the Central Association of Christian Social Organisations. In 1912, Scherrer was elected for the CSP to the St Gallen Cantonal Council, and in 1919 for the Catholic Conservative Party to the national council.

In 1919, Scherrer became the general secretary and president of the Christian National Union Confederation, serving until 1951. The following year, he additionally became the founding president of the International Federation of Christian Trade Unions, serving until 1928. In 1948, he became president of the International Christian Social Association.

Trade union offices
Preceded by New position	President of the International Federation of Christian Trade Unions; 1920–1928	Succeeded by Bernhard Otte
