= Construction Industry and Energy =

Construction, Industry and Energy (Dutch: Bouw-industrie & Energie, French: Bâtiment-industrie & Énergie; BIE) is a trade union representing workers in the construction and energy sectors in Belgium.

The union was founded in 2010, when the Christian Union of Building and Industry merged with the Christian Union of Mining, Energy, Chemicals and Leather. Like both its predecessors, it affiliated to the Confederation of Christian Trade Unions. On formation, it had around 300,000 members.

== Presidents ==
2010: Luc Van Dessel
2012: Stefaan Vanthourenhout
2017: Patrick Vandenberghe
