= General Federation of Transport and the Environment =

Trade union of France

The General Federation of Transport and the Environment (French: Fédération générale des transports et de l'environnement, FGTE) is a French trade union representing transportation workers, refuse workers, and those with jobs relating to the environment.

The union was founded in 1977, as the General Federation of Transport and Equipment, when the Federation of Railway Workers merged with the Federation of Seafarers, the Transport Federation, and the Equipment Federation. It affiliated to the French Democratic Confederation of Labour. By 1995, the union claimed 40,500 members, and by 2017, this had increased to 43,666.
