= Bernhard Otte =

German trade union leader and politician

Bernhard Otte (12 July 1883 – 21 October 1933) was a German trade union leader and politician.

Born in Hopsten, Otte completed an apprenticeship as a weaver. In 1905, he founded a branch of the Central Association of Christian Textile Workers in Ibbenbüren. He studied economics and the law in his spare time. In 1907, he was elected as a city councillor in Kempen, for the Centre Party.

Otte moved to Bocholt in 1911, where he was again elected to the city council, and was chair of the local branch of his union. In 1917, he was appointed as editor of the union's national newspaper, the Textilarbeiterzeitung, and the following year, he became president of the union.

The Central Association was affiliated to the United Federation of Christian Trade Unions in Germany (GCGD), and Otte was appointed as its general secretary in 1921. In 1928, he was additionally elected as president of the International Federation of Christian Trade Unions. In 1929, he became president of the GCGD, also becoming vice-president of the conservative German Trade Union Confederation.

In 1932, Otte was elected to the Landtag of Prussia. The following year, after the Nazi takeover of the country, the GCGD was subsumed into the German Labour Front, with Otte's acquiescence. He represented that body at an international labour conference in June 1933, but he and fellow trade unionist Wilhelm Leuschner refused to speak in support of the Nazis. He left the trade union movement, and died in October in a traffic accident, one which may have been a cover for an assassination by Nazis.

Trade union offices
Preceded by Adam Stegerwald	General Secretary of the United Federation of Christian Trade Unions in Germany; 1921–1928	Succeeded by Post vacant
Preceded by ?	President of the International Federation of Christian Trade Unions of Textile Workers; 1921–1933	Succeeded by Heinrich Fahrenbach
Preceded by Adam Stegerwald	General Secretary of the United Federation of Christian Trade Unions in Germany; 1928–1933	Succeeded by Federation dissolved
Preceded by Josef Scherrer	President of the International Federation of Christian Trade Unions; 1928–1933	Succeeded by Henri Pauwels and Jules Zirnheld
