= Lycée Notre-Dame Saint-Sigisbert =

Catholic school in Nancy, France

Coordinates: 48.6951°N 6.1752°E

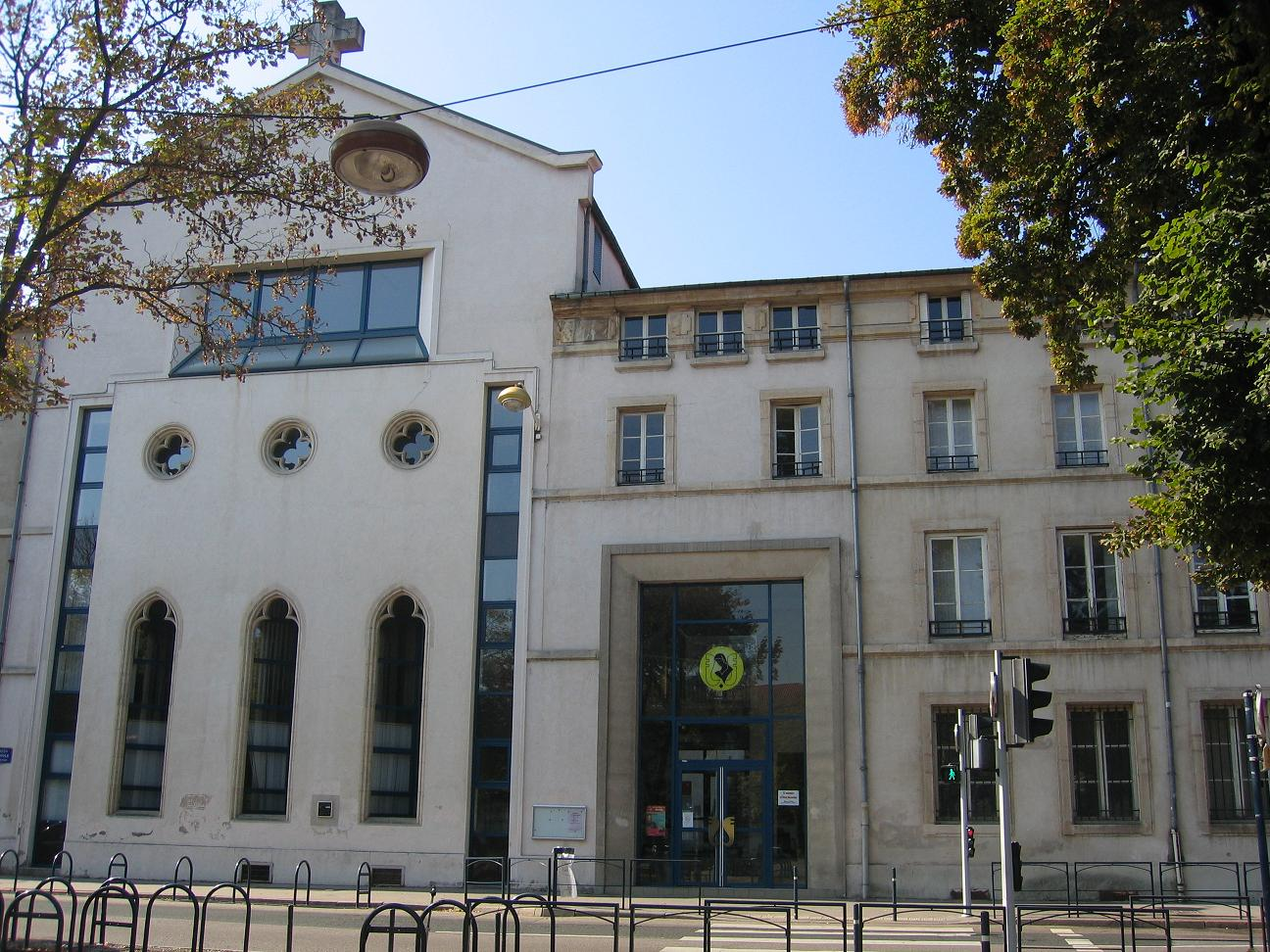

Notre-Dame Saint-Sigisbert is a private Catholic school in Nancy, France run in cooperation with the state. It was ranked 10th in excellence out of 48 schools in 2006 by the magazine L'Étudiant.

The school was established in 1881 from the earlier House of Students, which had been founded in 1864 by Bishop Charles Martial Lavigerie.)

== Sister schools ==
Saint-Sigisbert has three sister schools in three European countries:

- United Kingdom – Mount St Mary's College
- Italy – Scuola Enrico Fermi à Padoue
- Germany – Gymnase Johanneum de Hombourg

== Famous alumni ==
- Louis Marin, politician
- Eugène Tisserant, cardinal
- Pierre Schaeffer, composer
- François Guillaume, politician
- François Chérèque, trade unionist
- Jean-Philippe Jaworski, writer
- Johann Vexo, organist
