= Transcom (trade union) =

Trade union

Transcom is a trade union representing workers in the transport and communication industries in Belgium.

The union was founded on 1 April 2001, when the Christian Union of Communication and Culture merged with the Christian Union of Transport and Diamond Workers. Like both its predecessors, it affiliated to the Confederation of Christian Trade Unions. By 2007, the union had about 82,000 members.

== Presidents ==
2001: Michel Bovy
2007: Marc Vanlaethem
2012: Katrien Verwimp
