= International Federation of Christian Miners' Unions =

The International Federation of Christian Miners' Unions (French: Fédération internationale des syndicats chrétiens de mineurs, FISCM) was a global union federation bringing together trade unions representing workers in the mining industry.

A group of Christian miners' unions met at a conference in Salzburg, in 1921. They agreed to hold conference in Innsbruck in 1922, at which the federation was established, as the International Christian Miners' Federation. It established offices in Brussels, and affiliated to the International Federation of Christian Trade Unions.

By 1979, the federation's affiliates claimed a total of 220,000 members. On 14 October 1985, the federation merged with the International Federation for the Graphical Industries, the World Federation for the Metallurgic Industry, and the World Federation of Energy, Chemical and Various Industry Workers' Unions, forming the World Federation of Industry Workers.

== General Secretaries ==
1921: Jacques Van Buggenhout
1947: Mathieu Thomassen
1972: Jef Ooms
1975:
