= Metea (trade union) =

Metea is a trade union representing metal and textile workers in Belgium.

The union was founded on 12 December 2009, when the Christian Union of Belgian Metalworkers merged with the Christian Union of Belgian Textile and Clothing Workers. Like both its predecessors, it affiliated to the Confederation of Christian Trade Unions. At its founding, it had 250,000 members.

== Presidents ==
2009: Marc De Wilde
2018: William Van Erdeghem
