= Fernand Kikongi =

Congolese trade union leader (1935–2009)

Fernand Kikongi di Mwisa (1 September 1935 – 1 April 2009) was a Congolese trade union leader.

Born in Kinshasa, Kikongi was educated at the School of Social Studies in Leuven, before returning to Zaire, where he became the general secretary of the National Union of Congolese Workers, and then president of the Congolese Trade Union Confederation. Internationally, he was elected as president of the Democratic Organization of African Workers' Trade Unions, and then from 1997 was president of the World Confederation of Labour. He retired in 2001 and suffered a lengthy illness, dying in 2009.

Trade union offices
Preceded by New position	President of the Democratic Organization of African Workers' Trade Unions; 1995–2003	Succeeded by Toolsyraj Benedyn
Preceded by Willy Peirens	President of the World Confederation of Labour; 1997–2001	Succeeded by Basile Mahan Gahé
