= General Agri-Food Federation =

Trade union of France

The General Agri-Food Federation (French: Fédération générale agroalimentaire, FGA) is a trade union representing workers in the agricultural and food processing sectors in France.

The union was founded in 1980, when the General Federation of Agriculture merged with the General Federation of Food. Like its predecessors, the union affiliated to the French Democratic Confederation of Labour. By 1994, the union claimed 37,300 members, and by 2017, this was almost unchanged, at 37,428.
