= General Federation of Mines and Metallurgy =

Trade union of France

The General Federation of Mines and Metallurgy (French: Fédération générale des mines et de la métallurgie, FGMM) is a trade union representing workers in the metal and mining industries in France.

The union was established in 1984, when the General Federation of Metallurgy merged with the Federation of Miners. Like its predecessors, the union affiliated to the French Democratic Confederation of Labour. By 1994, the union claimed 48,200 members, and by 2017, this had risen to 56,142.

== General Secretaries ==
1984: Georges Granger
1987: Jean Limonet
1987: Gérard Dantin
1992: Robert Bonnand
2000: Marcel Grignard
2005: Dominique Gillier
2014: Philippe Portier
2018: Stéphane Destugues
2025: Stéphane Maciag
