= French Democratic Confederation of Labour =

Trade union in France

CFDT
- French Democratic Confederation of Labour
- Confédération Française Démocratique du Travail

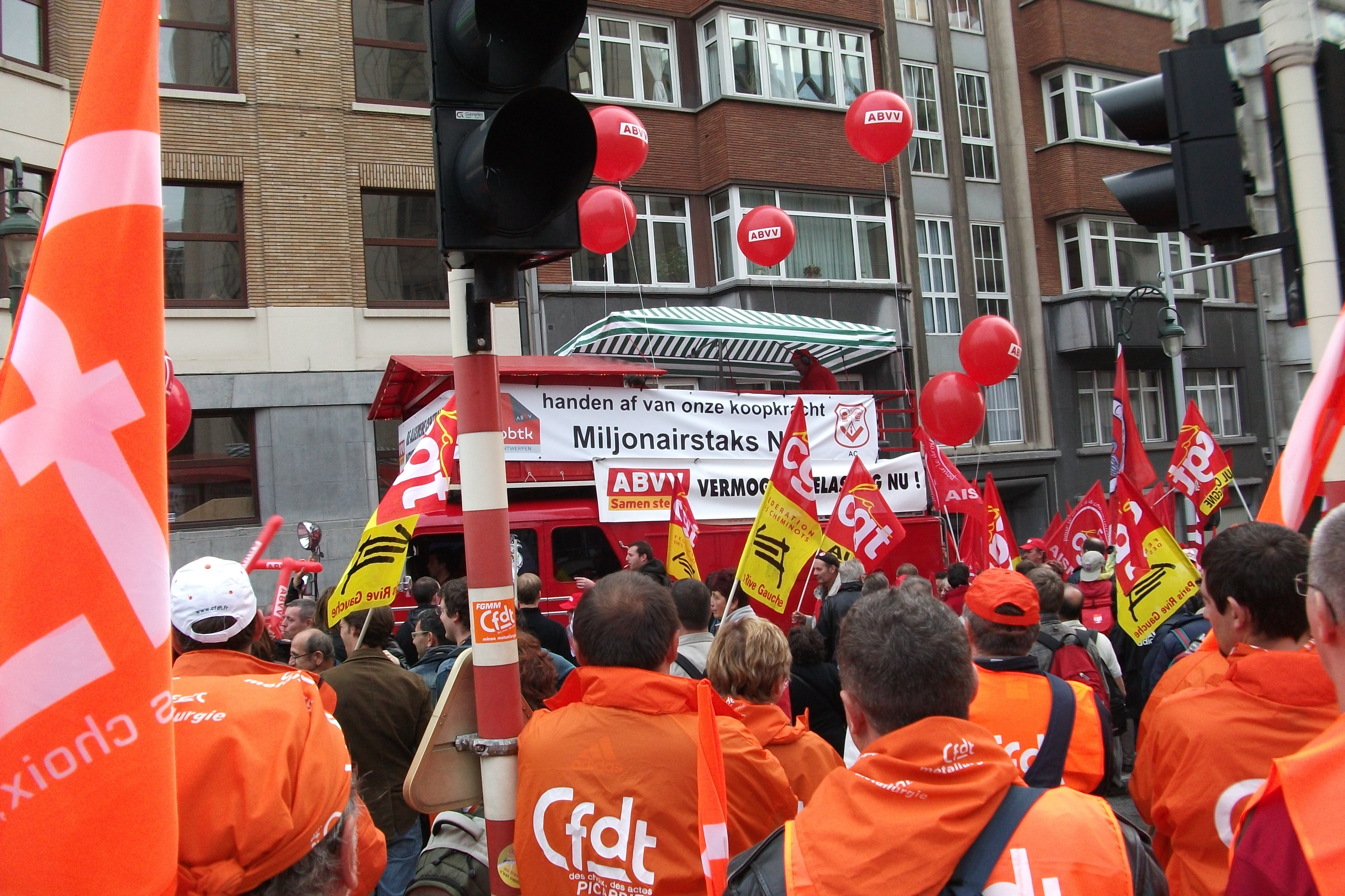
- A demonstration by the CFDT in Brussels in 2010 against austerity policies
- Founded: 1919; 107 years ago (as CFTC); 1964; 62 years ago (current form)
- Headquarters: Paris, France
- Location: France
- Members: 612,205 (2022)
- General Secretary: Marylise Léon
- Affiliations: ITUC, ETUC, TUAC
- Website: www.cfdt.fr

The French Democratic Confederation of Labour (French: Confédération française démocratique du travail, CFDT) is a national trade union center, one of the five major French confederations of trade unions, led since 2023 by Marylise Léon. It is the second largest French trade union confederation by number of members (625,000) and recently becoming first in voting results for representative bodies, having traditionally been second.

== History ==
The CFDT has its roots in Christian trade unionism of the French Confederation of Christian Workers (CFTC).

After the Liberation of France, a left-wing minority, grouped in the Reconstruction tendency, led an internal debate in favour of the “deconfessionalization” seeking to secularise the CFTC and achieve greater autonomy from political and religious circles with which the confederation's leadership had been associated. The Reconstruction movement also campaigned for left-wing, social democracy and democratic trade unionism without being Marxist, and against the European treaties deemed to restore a capitalist Europe, under the guise of Christian democracy.

This tendency took root in the mineworker and steelworker sections, in the wake of French Resistance and the Bataille de la production, Gradually the movement grew in strength within the CFTC, becoming its dominant force in to 1960s under the leadership of Eugène Descamps.

The breakthrough came in 1964, when an extraordinary CFTC congress—held at the Palais des Sports in Paris on 6 and 7 November—voted to secularise the CFTC and rename it to the French Democratic Confederation of Labour (CFDT). A minority of approximately 10% opposed the change and instead followed Joseph Sauty's into the immediately refounded "continuation French Confederation of Christian Workers".

At first, under the leadership of Eugène Descamps, the CFDT presented itself as a social-democratic confederation close to the Unified Socialist Party (Parti socialiste unifié or PSU) which was led by Pierre Mendès-France. It sometimes acted in concert with the Communist Party aligned General Confederation of Labour (CGT). This alliance took a part in the May 68 upheaval. Then, the CFDT was auto-gestionary.

In 1974, many PSU and CFDT members joined the Socialist Party (Parti socialiste or PS) led by François Mitterrand. With Michel Rocard at their helm, they formed an internal opposition called "the second left". They abandoned the auto-gestionary project and advocated aligning themselves with the European social-democracy model. At the same time, under the leadership of Edmond Maire, the CFDT cut its ties with the CGT.

In the 1980s, after François Mitterrand's election and his choice to follow social democratic economic policies, the CFDT appeared to be a pro-governmental organization. During this time a lot of members and voters were lost. In the 1990s, under the leadership of Nicole Notat, the CFDT chose to distance its strategy from the PS. In this, it supported Alain Juppé's plan of Welfare State reform. It replaced Force ouvrière (FO) as the "main partner" of employers and right-wing governments, and the presidency of social security offices.

In 2003, the support of the new CFDT leader François Chérèque for pensions reform plans caused an internal crisis. Some CFDT members left the confederation and chose the CGT or the autonomous trade unions SUD. However, the CFDT participated with the other confederations to the 2006 conflict about the Contrat première embauche (CPE).

== Professional elections ==
The CFDT won 21.81% of the vote in the employee's college during the 2008 professional elections, making it the second largest trade union in terms of votes in those elections. This result, however, is below the CFDT's 25.23% result in 2002 and its top result to date, 25.35% in 1997.

== Affiliates ==
=== Current ===
The following federations are affiliated:

Federation	Abbreviation	Founded	Membership (2017)
Chemistry and Energy Federation	FCE	1997	37,428
Communication, Consulting, Culture Federation	F3C	2005	43,666
Federation of Banks and Insurance	FBA	1954	
Federation of Health and Social Services	Santé Sociaux	1935	93,570
Federation of General Unions of National Education	SGEN	1937	24,952
Federation of Services	CFDT Services	1913	81,094
Federation of Social Protection, Work and Employment	PSTE		
Federation of State Establishments and Arsenals	FEAE	1962	
Finance Federation	CFDT Finances		
General Agri-Food Federation	FGA	1980	37,428
General Federation of Mines and Metallurgy	FGMM	1984	56,142
General Federation of Transport and the Environment	FGTE	1977	43,666
Interco Federation	Interco	1974	68,618
National Federation of Construction and Wood Workers	FNCB	1934	24,952
Private Training and Education Federation	FEP	1938	

Other affiliates are:

- CFDT Executives (UCC CFDT)
- Confederate Union of Retired Persons (UCR CFDT)
- Union of Public Service and Similar Federations (UFFA)

=== Former ===
Union	Left	Reason not affiliated
Equipment Federation	1977	Merged into FGTE
Federation of Chemicals and Glass	1997	Merged into FCE
Federation of Food, Hotel, Cafe and Restaurant Workers	1980	Merged into FGA
Federation of French Sailors and Fishermen	1977	Merged into FGTE
Federation of Judicial Professions		
Federation of Labour Ministry Employees		
Federation of Miners	1984	Merged into FGMM
Federation of Railway Workers	1977	Merged into FGTE
Federation of Social Security		
Federation of Transport	1977	Merged into FGTE
Federation of the Textile, Clothing and Leather Industries	2007	Merged into CFDT Services
Federation of Unions of Post and Telecommunications	2005	Merged into F3C
French Federation of Unions of Commercial Travellers and Agents		
French Federation of Police Unions		
General Federation of Agriculture	1980	Merged into FGA
General Federation of Metallurgy	1984	Merged into FGMM
National Federation of Civil Aviation		
National Federation of Personnel of the Electricity and Gas Industries	1997	Merged into FCE
National Federation of Unions of Communal Employees	1974	Merged into Interco
National Federation of Unions of Printing Trades, Paper and Cardboard Workers	1971	Merged into CFDT Services

== Leadership ==
=== General Secretaries ===
1964: Eugène Descamps
1971: Edmond Maire
1988: Jean Kaspar
1992: Nicole Notat
2002: François Chérèque
2012: Laurent Berger
2023: Marylise Léon

=== Presidents ===
1964: Georges Levard
1967: André Jeanson
1971: Laurent Lucas
1973: Post abolished

== Notable members ==
- Edmond Maire
- François Chérèque
- Nicole Notat
- Pierre Rosanvallon
