= List of trade unions in Belgium =

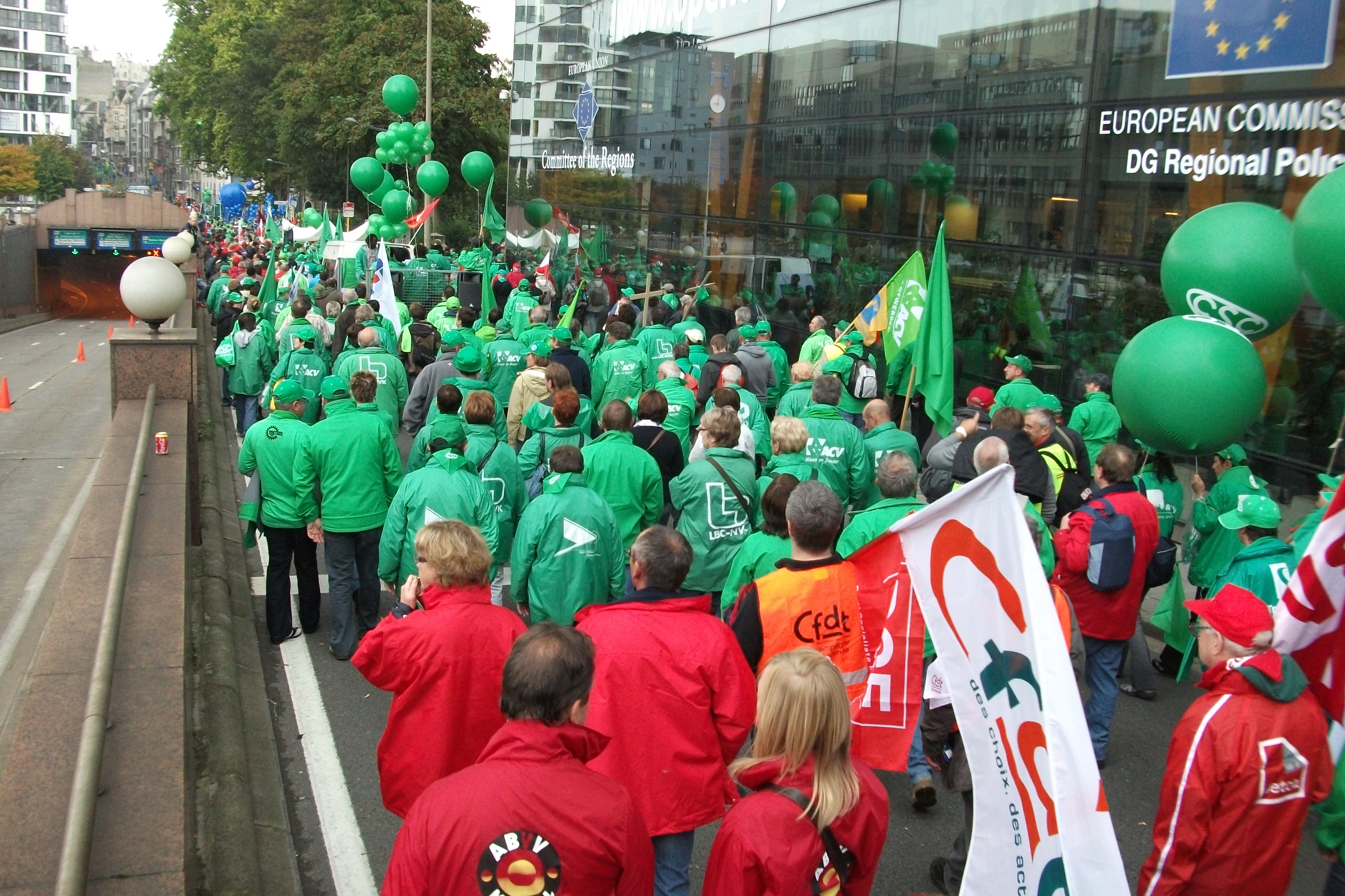
Socialist (red) and Christian (green) trade unionists pictured in Brussels in 2010

This article contains a list of trade unions in Belgium.

In Belgium, trade unions are organised along politico-denominational lines, following the pillarisation in Belgian society. Therefore, the three major trade unions are all confederations, each adhering to a particular religion or ideology, namely Christian (Catholic), Socialist and Liberal. Each confederation cuts across industry boundaries, having members working in many different sectors. Only the liberal federation, however, has no subsidiary trade unions.

== List of federations ==
Name	Ideology	Membership
Confederation of Christian Trade Unions Algemeen Christelijk Vakverbond (ACV); Confédération des syndicats chrétiens (CSC)	Social Catholicism	1,661,800 (2012)
General Federation of Belgian Labour Algemeen Belgisch Vakverbond (ABVV); Fédération Générale du Travail de Belgique (FGTB)	Socialism	1,503,700 (2012)
General Confederation of Liberal Trade Unions of Belgium Algemene Centrale der Liberale Vakbonden van België (ACLVB); Centrale générale des syndicats libéraux de Belgique (CGSLB)	Liberalism	289,700 (2012)
