= International Federation Textile-Clothing =

Trade Federation in the 1900s

IFTC/FITH
- International Federation Textile-Clothing
- Fédération Internationale Textile - Habillement
- Merged into: International Textile, Garment and Leather Workers' Federation
- Founded: 10 September 1901
- Dissolved: November 2007
- Headquarters: Koning Albertlaan 27, Ghent, Belgium
- Location: International
- Members: 400,000 (1979)
- Affiliations: World Confederation of Labour

The International Federation Textile-Clothing (IFTC/FITH) was an International Trade Federation of the World Confederation of Labour (WCL).

== History ==
The federation traced its history to 1901, when the International Federation of Christian Trade Unions of Textile Workers was established at a meeting in Düsseldorf. The organisation ceased to operate during World War I, but was revived in 1921. By 1935, it had affiliates in Belgium, Czechoslovakia, France, the Netherlands and Switzerland.

It later merged with the International Federation of Christian Trade Unions in the Clothing and Allied Trades, and changed its name to the International Federation of Christian Trade Unions of Textile and Garment Workers, then in 1971 it became the International Federation of Textile and Clothing Workers' Unions.

In 2006, the WCL merged with the International Confederation of Free Trade Unions, and in November 2007, the IFTC merged into the International Textile, Garment and Leather Workers' Federation (ITGLWF).

== Organisation ==
The federation worked closely with the Latin American Federation of Industrial and Construction Workers (FLATIC), and the Asian Trade Federation for the Mixed Industries Group, both WCL-affiliated bodies. In Europe, it instead worked with the European Trade Union Committee for Textiles, Clothing and Leather, which was dominated by ITGLWF affiliates.

== Leadership ==
=== General Secretaries ===
1921: Albert van der Meijs
1940s: H. A. C. Huysmans
1974: Clem Pauwels
1990s: Bart Bruggeman
2000s: Jaap Jongejan

=== Presidents ===
1921: Bernhard Otte
1933: Heinrich Fahrenbach
1940s: Prosper van Wesemael
1970s: Lucien Fruru
1990s: Jacques Jouret
2000s: Dirk Uyttenhove
