= Henri Pauwels =

Belgian trade unionist and politician

Henri Pauwels (19 January 1890 – 18 September 1946) was a Belgian trade unionist and politician.

Born in Nivelles, Pauwels became a mechanic, and joined Christian Union of Belgian Metalworkers (CCMB), becoming a technical adviser in 1912. The CCMB was affiliated to the Confederation of Christian Trade Unions (ACV), and Pauwels became its deputy general secretary in 1919, then general secretary in 1921. In 1932, he became the confederation's president. From 1933 to 1937, he was additionally co-president of the International Federation of Christian Trade Unions.

In 1945, despite not being a member of Parliament, Pauwels was appointed as the Minister for War Victims. In December, he travelled to the Belgian Congo, his presence leading to the formation of the ACV-Congo. In September, he was killed in a plane crash in Newfoundland.

Trade union offices
Preceded by Evarist Van Quaquebeke	General Secretary of the Confederation of Christian Trade Unions; 1921–1932	Succeeded by August Cool
Preceded by René Debruyne	President of the Confederation of Christian Trade Unions; 1932–1946	Succeeded by August Cool
Preceded by Bernhard Otte	President of the International Federation of Christian Trade Unions; 1933–1937; With: Jules Zirnheld	Succeeded by Jules Zirnheld
