= August Vanistendael =

Belgian trade union leader

August Vanistendael (9 January 1917 – 8 September 2003) was a Belgian trade union leader and Catholic social activist.

Born in Birtley, Tyne and Wear, in England, Vanistendael grew up in Belgium, and began working as a clerk at BAC, the Christian labour movement bank. In 1938, he became the secretary of the Christian Union of Belgian Hospitality Workers, and then during the Nazi occupation he headed a union for workers in tourism.

After the war, Vanistendael began working for the International Federation of Christian Trade Unions (IFCTU). He became deputy general secretary in 1947, and then general secretary in 1952. Under his leadership, the federation began admitting unions in the global south, and unions in non-Christian religious traditions, leading it to become the World Confederation of Labour in 1968.

Vanistendael worked as an advisor to Konrad Adenauer, and also to Joseph Frings. He also served as a lay auditor during the Second Vatican Council. In 1961, he founded Cooperation and Solidarity, which awarded scholarships to students from poorer countries, and Pro Mundi Vita, which conducted research into development aid. He left his trade union post in 1967, to become the founding president of CIDSE, then from 1975 until 1983 he served as the president of Caritas Internationalis. In 1983, he was made an honorary Minister of State.

Trade union offices
Preceded by Jos Serrarens	General Secretary of the International Federation of Christian Trade Unions; 1952–1967	Succeeded by Jean Brück
