= Alternatives économiques =

- magazine specializing in economic issues
- Type: monthly magazine
- Publisher: Desarrollo de Medios S.A. de C.V.
- Editor: L'Autre Regie
- Founded: 1980; 46 years ago
- Language: French magazine
- Headquarters: Paris, France
- Circulation: 74,057 copies (2020)
- Website: www.alternatives-economiques.fr

Alternatives économiques (French pronunciation: [altɛʁnativ(z‿)ekɔnɔmik]; lit. 'Economic Alternatives') is a French magazine specializing in economic issues. The magazine was established in 1980 by Denis Clerc. It is published on a monthly basis. The headquarters is in Paris. During the period 2013–2014 the magazine had a circulation of 89,297 copies. According to the One investigation conducted by Audipresse, Alternatives économiques is France's second-most-read business magazine.

Initially, due to its modest financial resources, the publication was bimonthly. Thanks to the support of the printing press, the financial burden was reduced, also because the magazine managed to convince 1,000 subscribers the following month after its launch, this in a field dominated by magazines like L'Expansion. Clerc remained director of the magazine until 1999, when he was succeeded by Philippe Frémeaux.

In 2018, Alternatives économiques was awarded the magazine of the year award by the Syndicat des éditeurs de la presse magazine (SEPM) and Relay stores.
