= World Federation for the Metallurgic Industry =

The World Federation for the Metallurgic Industry (French: Fédération mondiale de la métallurgie, FMM) was a global union federation representing workers in the metalworking industry.

== History ==
The federation was established at a meeting in Essen, in August 1920, as the International Federation of Christian Trade Unions of Metal Workers. It held its first congress in November 1921 in Turin, when it agreed its statutes. It established offices in Utrecht, and affiliated to the International Federation of Christian Trade Unions.

By 1934, the federation had affiliates in Belgium, Czechoslovakia, France, Hungary, the Netherlands, Poland, Switzerland, and Yugoslavia, with a total of 96,656 members. By 1979, this had grown to 500,000 members.

The federation voted to dissolve in 1983, believing that, with members in eight countries, it could not achieve effective action. Although it undertook no further activity, on 14 October 1985, it was officially merged with the International Federation for the Graphical Industries, the International Federation of Christian Miners' Unions, and the World Federation of Energy, Chemical and Various Industry Workers' Unions, forming the World Federation of Industry Workers.

== Affiliates ==
In 1979, the following unions were affiliated, along with eight indirectly affiliated unions in Asia, and some members in general unions in Latin America:

Union	Country	Membership
Christian Fraction of the Union of Metal, Mining and Energy	Austria	10,000
Christian Metalworkers' Union of Switzerland	Switzerland	21,000
Christian Union of Belgian Metalworkers	Belgium	159,000
Federation des Travailleurs de la Métallurgie, des Mines et des Produits Chimiques	Canada	
Federacion Ecuatoriana de Trabajadores Metalurgicos y Afinas	Ecuador	10,000
Indian Federation of Metal and Engineering Workers	India	65,000
Industrial Workers' Union CNV	Netherlands	35,000
Industrial Workers' Union NKV	Netherlands	58,000
Luxembourg Confederation of Christian Trade Unions	Luxembourg	3,500
Solidaridad de Obreros de Catalunya	Spain	
Swiss Federation of Protestant Trade Unions	Switzerland	5,000

== Membership ==
=== General Secretaries ===
Arthur Bertinchamps
Willy Goeminne
F. W. M. Spit

=== Presidents ===
Jules Coeck
1969: Rene Javaux
1972: G. Heiremans
