= Jos Serrarens =

Dutch politician

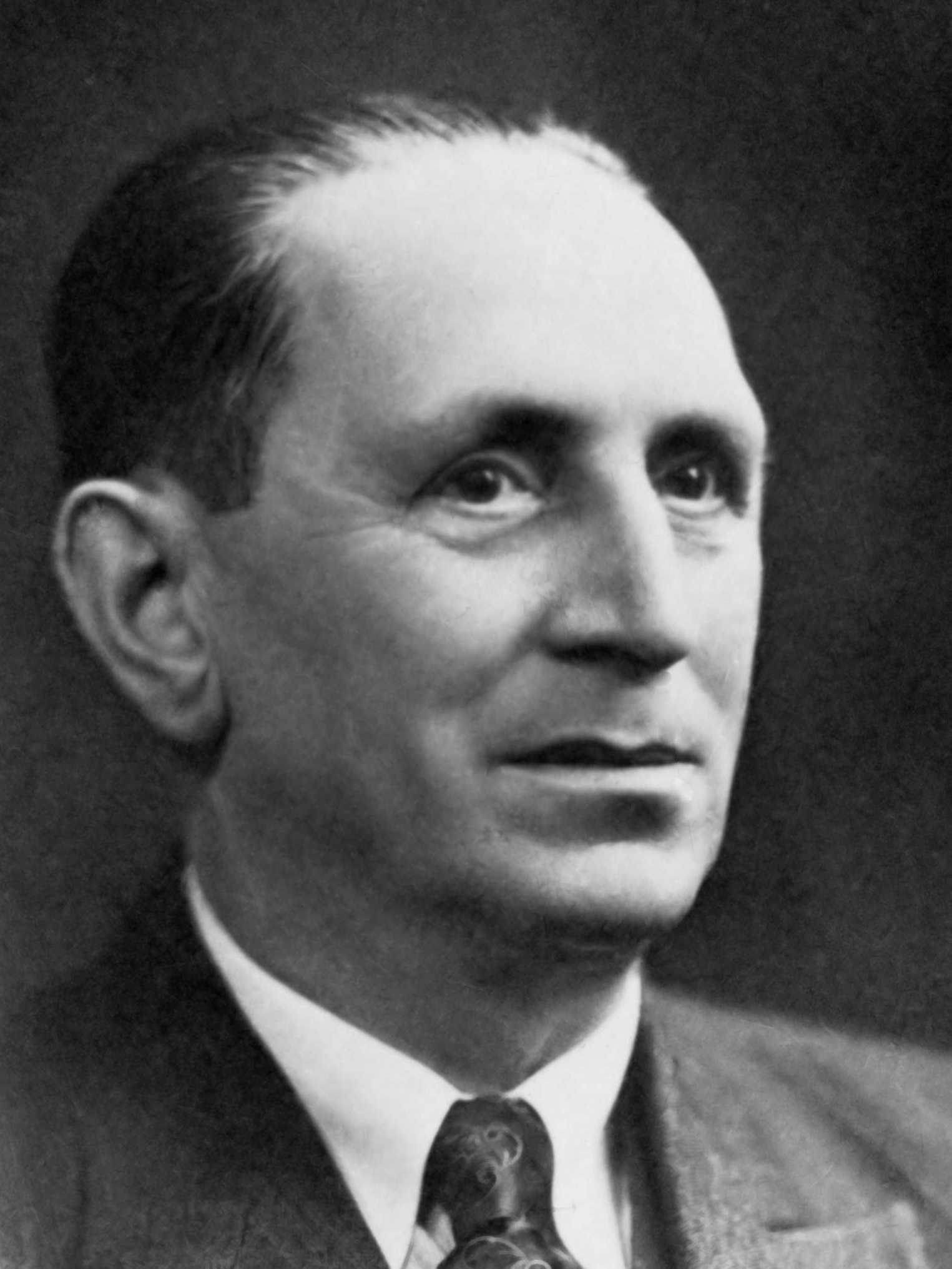

Secretary General of the International Federation of Christian Trade Unions
- In office October 1920 – 1 January 1953
- Preceded by: Office created
- Succeeded by: August Vanistendael

Member of the Senate
- In office 17 September 1929 – 8 June 1937

Member of the House of Representatives
- In office 8 June 1937 – 27 July 1948

Member of the House of Representatives
- In office 12 August 1948 – 4 December 1952

Judge of the European Court of Justice of the European Coal and Steel Community
- In office 4 December 1952 – 6 October 1958

Personal details
- Born: 12 October 1888 Dordrecht, Netherlands
- Died: 26 August 1963 (aged 74) Bilthoven, Netherlands
- Party: RKSP (until 1945); KVP (1945—)

Petrus Josephus Servatius (Jos) Serrarens (12 November 1888 – 26 August 1963) was a Dutch politician and judge. From 1920 to 1953 Serrarens was the Secretary General of the International Federation of Christian Trade Unions. He was member of the Senate of the Netherlands and later the House of Representatives. Although not having completed any legal training, he became a judge at the European Court of Justice, where he worked from 1952 until 1958.

== Biography ==
Serrarens was born on 12 November 1888 in Dordrecht as the son of a bookkeeper of the department of Defense. In 1907 he became a teacher in Dordrecht, where he worked in that position until 1914. He then started studying law at Leiden University, but dropped out after two years. At the end of that year he was introduced to Catholic socialist movement Katholieke Sociale Actie, Serrarens joined the organization as a librarian. Until 1920 Serrarens moved throughout the circuit of Catholic socialist movements.

After World War I devastated Europe, a sense of cooperation was felt in the countries of Western Europe. Serrarens was the negotiator between Belgian, German and French parties wishing to construct an internationally operating Roman Catholic labour union. His efforts were successful and Serrarens became Secretary General of the International Federation of Christian Trade Unions (IFCTU). During his tenure as Secretary General of the IFCTU Serrarens spoke out against the fascist regime of Italy and later the nazist regime of Germany. Between 17 September 1929 and 8 June 1937 Serrarens was member of the Dutch Senate. In the Senate he focused on the areas of education, social affairs, finances and foreign affairs. On 8 June 1937 he left the Senate to become member of the Dutch House of Representatives. In both houses he was member of the RKSP.

When Germany invaded the Netherlands in 1940 the secretariat of the IFCTU was raided, Serrarens had however moved the most important documents of the organization to neutral Geneva, Switzerland in advance. In 1942 German police tried to arrest Serrarens at his home, Serrarens had however been tipped off and thereby escaped imprisonment. During the rest of the war Serrarens went into hiding.

After the war ended Serrarens resumed his work for the IFCTU and showed himself a supporter of European integration. In 1945 the RKSP transformed into the KVP and in the House of Representatives Serrarens distinguished himself as the foreign affairs specialist of the KVP. On 19 March 1948 Serrarens together with Marinus van der Goes van Naters introduced a motion in the House of Representatives calling for more European integration, the motion passed. His term in the House ended on 27 July 1948, but he started a new term on 12 August 1948.

From 4 December 1952 until 6 October 1958 he was a judge at the European Court of Justice of the European Coal and Steel Community. To attain this position he left his occupation at the IFCTU and he resigned his seat in the House of Representatives. He was appointed as judge even though he had not completed any legal training. In 1958 he reached the mandatory age of retirement of 70. On 26 August 1963 Serrarens died in the Berg en Bosch hospital in Bilthoven.

== Decorations ==
Netherlands

- Knight of the Order of Orange-Nassau, 30 August 1928
- Knight of the Order of the Netherlands Lion, 30 September 1937

Foreign

- Officer of the Legion of Honour (France), April 1951
