= Jules Zirnheld =

French trade union leader (1876–1940)

Henri Jules Zirnheld (9 November 1876 – 18 December 1940) was a French trade union leader.

Born in the Alsace, Zirnheld studied at the Christian Brothers' school in Saint-Thomas-d'Aquin, Paris, then became an accountant. He was enthusiastic about Catholic social works, and in 1892, he joined the Trade and Industry Employees' Union (SECI), a union of Catholic workers. In 1896, he attended a Christian workers' congress in Reims, and this inspired him to become more involved in the union, editing its journal.

Zirnheld completed his military service in 1898/99, and then won election to his union's executive. In 1900, he passed an exam which secured him work at the Bank of France. He remained active in SECI, and attended the first international congress of Christian workers, in Paris.

In 1902, the General Confederation of Labour (CGT), had SECI expelled from the Paris Trades Council. Zirnheld began speaking out against the CGT, and socialism more generally. In 1903, he defeated CGT efforts to exclude his union from the International Employees Congress. In 1906, he was elected as the union's president.

As leader of SECI, Zirnheld tried to maintain a course independent of both the Catholic religious hierarchy, and the secular trade union movement. He was elected to the national industrial tribunal in 1911, and in 1913 he was the founder of the French Federation of Catholic Employees' Unions.

Zirnheld served in the French Army during World War I, but was taken as a prisoner of war in 1916. He tried to smuggle information on the German military back into France, but he was informed upon, and was sentenced to 12 years hard labour. Three months later, the war ended, and he returned home.

Back in France, Zirnheld led the move to form the French Confederation of Christian Workers (CFTC), becoming its first president, although against his objections, it admitted all Christians, not just Catholics. He chaired the conference which agreed to found the International Federation of Christian Trade Unions (IFCTU), and when it was set up, in 1920, he became vice president. He opposed the general strikes in France, led by the CGT.

In 1933, with the IFCTU declining, Zirnheld was elected as its joint president, becoming sole president in 1937. That year, he was awarded the Grand Cross of the Order of St Sylvester. But from 1938, he began suffering with poor health. The CFTC was dissolved, along with the CGT, in 1940, and Zirnheld signed the Manifesto of the Twelve along with CGT leaders, in protest, but he died before the end of the year.

Trade union offices
| Preceded by New position | President of the French Confederation of Christian Workers; 1919–1940 | Succeeded by Georges Torcq |
| Preceded by Bernhard Otte | President of the International Federation of Christian Trade Unions; 1933–1940; With: Henri Pauwels (1933–1937) | Succeeded by Gaston Tessier |
