= Willy Peirens =

Belgian trade unionist

Willy Peirens (born 19 August 1936) is a former Belgian trade union leader.

Born in Deinze, Peirens was active in the Catholic Workers' Youth, becoming its national co-ordinator in 1959. In 1968, he transferred to become youth officer at the Confederation of Christian Trade Unions (ACV), then in the early 1970s became the co-ordinator of its regional structure. In 1977, he became secretary of the ACV's Flemish region, and in 1987, the ACV's national president. In 1989, he was additionally elected as the president of the World Confederation of Labour. He retired in 1999, but was made honorary president of the ACV.

Trade union offices
Preceded by Jef Houthuys	President of the Confederation of Christian Trade Unions; 1987–1999	Succeeded by Luc Cortebeeck
Preceded by Johnny Tan	President of the World Confederation of Labour; 1989–1999	Succeeded by Fernand Kikongi
