= Nicole Notat =

French trade unionist

General Secretary of the French Democratic Confederation of Labour
- In office 1992–2002
- Preceded by: Jean Kaspar
- Succeeded by: François Chérèque

Personal details
- Born: 26 July 1947 (age 78) Châtrices, Marne, France
- Profession: Teacher

Nicole Notat (born 26 July 1947 in Châtrices, Marne) is the former secretary general of the union CFDT. She is currently founder and president of Vigeo, a company committed to a concept of sustainable development.

Notat is a member of the Group of Reflection on the Future of Europe chaired by Felipe Gonzalez and established by the European Council. The group's mission is to propose to the European Council of March 2010 a strategic roadmap for Europe in 2020–2030. Since 2010, Notat has served as President of Le Siècle, the first woman to do so.

She was the first woman to lead a trade union in France.
