= United Federation of Christian Trade Unions in Germany =

Type of trade unions in Germany

The United Federation of Christian Trade Unions in Germany (German: Gesamtverband der christlichen Gewerkschaften Deutschlands, GcG) was a national trade union federation in Germany.

The federation was established in 1901 by 23 independent unions. It initially had a membership of 77,000, but grew to 350,000 in 1912, and then peaked at 1,100,000 in 1919. It gradually lost members over the following decade, and by 1931 was down to 580,000. While it was open to all Christians, 80% of its membership was Catholic. The federation worked closely with the Centre Party, until in 1933 it was dissolved by the Nazi government.

== Affiliates ==
As of 1919, the following unions were affiliated:

Central Association of Christian Construction Workers
Union of Christian Miners
Gutenberg Association
Union of German Railway Workers and State Employees
Central Association of Christian Factory and Transport Workers
National Association of German Inn Employees
Central Association of Community Workers and Tram Workers
Central Graphical Association
Reich Association of Female Domestic Workers
Union of Homeworkers
Central Association of Christian Woodworkers
Association of Nurses
Central Association of Agricultural Workers
Central Association of Christian Painters
Christian Metalworkers' Association
German Gardeners' Association
Association of the Food and Beverage Industry Workers
Association of Christian Tailors
Association of Christian Tobacco and Cigar Workers
Central Association of Christian Textile Workers

== Leadership ==
=== Presidents ===
1901: August Brust
1904: Karl Matthias Schiffer
1919: Adam Stegerwald
1929: Bernhard Otte

=== General Secretaries ===
1903: Adam Stegerwald
1921: Bernhard Otte
1929: Post vacant
