= Interco Federation =

Trade union of France

INTERCO
- Interco Federation
- Fédération Interco
- Founded: May 24, 1974
- Members: 70,000
- Affiliations: French Democratic Confederation of Labour (CFDT)
- Website: https://interco.cfdt.fr/

The Interco Federation (French: Fédération Interco) is a trade union representing workers in local government and some civil servants in France.

== History ==
The federation was established the May 24, 1974, when the Federation of Local Government Workers merged with unions representing civil servants working in the Ministry of the Interior. Like its predecessors, it affiliated to the French Democratic Confederation of Labour. Initially known as the Federation of Ministry of the Interior Personnel and Local Government Workers, "Intérieur et collectivités" was soon shortened to "Interco". By 1995, the union claimed 42,300 members, and by 2017, this had grown to 68,618.

In the 2018 common territorial public service elections, the union obtained 202,718 votes out of 897,714, or 22.57%.

== Sectors ==
The union represents public and private workers in the following sectors:

- Local authorities,
- Ministry of the Interior,
- Ministry of Justice,
- Ministry of Foreign Affairs,
- Ministry of Solidarity,
- Public Housing Offices,
- Water and sanitation
- Funerals

== General Secretaries ==
1974: René Bellanger
1977: Jacques Nodin
1992: Alexis Guénégo
2005: Marie-Odile Esch
2015: Claire Le Calonnec
2021: Jacques Lager
