= Maurice Bouladoux =

Maurice Bouladoux (16 July 1907, Parthenay – 8 November 1977) was a French trade union leader.

Born in Parthenay, Bouladoux left school when he was 15, and became an accounting assistant in a textile mill. He joined a trade union in 1922, and was secretary of his union branch within a year. In 1925, while still only 18, he was a founder of the Christian Trade Unionist Youth, and began working as the secretary to Gaston Tessier, general secretary of the French Confederation of Christian Workers (CFTC). He held numerous administrative roles in the union, and wrote regularly on the subject of Christian trade unionism. From 1934, he also served as a councillor in Saint-Leu-la-Forêt.

Bouladoux was appointed as deputy general secretary of the CFTC in 1937, but argued that the federation should not seek large numbers of new recruits, as that might destabilise the organisation. When the CFTC was banned, in 1940, he was one of three CFTC signatories to the Manifesto of the Twelve, arguing against the dissolution of existing unions. He found work in management in a chemical works, and worked with former CFTC and General Confederation of Labour (CGT) leaders in opposing the Vichy regime.

The CFTC was re-established in 1944, following the liberation of France, and Bouladoux returned to his post as deputy general secretary, then became general secretary in 1948, then in 1953, he moved to become president. From 1946 until 1947, he was also mayor of Saint-Leu-la-Forêt.

In 1961, Bouladoux became honorary president of the CFTC, and he instead became president of the International Federation of Christian Trade Unions, serving until 1972.

Bouladoux died in Saint-Leu-la-Forêt on 8 November 1977.

Trade union offices
Preceded by Gaston Tessier	General Secretary of the French Confederation of Christian Workers; 1948–1953	Succeeded by Georges Levard
Preceded by Gaston Tessier	President of the French Confederation of Christian Workers; 1953–1961	Succeeded by Georges Levard
Preceded by Gaston Tessier	President of the International Federation of Christian Trade Unions; 1961–1973	Succeeded by Marcel Pepin
