= Federation of Social Protection, Work and Employment =

Trade union of France

- Fédération protection sociale, travail, emploi
- Abbreviation: PSTE
- Headquarters: France
- Members: 16,000 (1995)
- Affiliations: French Democratic Confederation of Labour
- Website: Official website

The Federation of Social Protection, Work and Employment (French: Fédération protection sociale, travail, emploi, PSTE) is a trade union representing civil servants in departments relating to social services and employment.

The union was founded when the Federation of Labour Ministry Employees merged with the Federation of Social Security. Like its predecessors, it affiliated to the French Democratic Confederation of Labour. By 1995, the union claimed 16,000 members.
