= Chemistry and Energy Federation =

Trade union of France

The Chemistry and Energy Federation (French: Fédération Chimie Energie, FCE) is a trade union representing workers in the energy and chemical industries in France.

The union was founded in 1997, when the Gas and Electricity Federation merged with the United Federation of Chemistry. Like its predecessors, the union affiliated to the French Democratic Confederation of Labour. By 2017, the union claimed 37,428 members. In addition to chemicals and energy, it also represents workers in rubber, writing instruments, yachting, paper and cardboard, petroleum, pharmaceuticals, plastics and glass.
