= High Council for Social Dialogue =

- Haut Conseil du Dialogue Social
- Formation: 20 August 2008
- Purpose: Review and recognition of trade union representativeness
- Headquarters: France
- Parent organization: Ministry of Labour

In France, the High Council for Social Dialogue (Haut Conseil du Dialogue Social) is a body established by the law of 20 August 2008

on the renovation of social democracy and reform of working hours

and is attached to the services of the Ministry of Labour. Its mission is to finalize, every four years, the list of trade unions recognized as representative by professional branch and at the national and interprofessional levels. It also provides recommendations to the minister of labour on the application of laws related to union representativeness.

== Composition ==
The council consists of:

- 5 full members and 5 alternates designated by national and interprofessional employee trade unions.
- 5 full members and 5 alternates designated by nationally representative employer organizations.
- 3 representatives from the Ministry of Labour.
- 3 qualified individuals appointed by the prime minister upon the proposal of the minister of labour.

The prime minister designates one of these three qualified individuals as the chairperson of the sessions. Members serve a five-year term.

The council was inaugurated on 5 March 2009 by Brice Hortefeux, then minister of labour, social relations, family, solidarity, and urban affairs. The first chairperson was Yannick Moreau, section president at the Council of State.

== Members appointed by the Decree of June 5, 2014 ==
Qualified individuals and representatives from the Ministry of Labour
| Name | Title |
|---|---|
| Jean-Denis Combrexelle | Qualified individual, chairperson of the sessions |
| Gilles Bélier | Qualified individual |
| Yves Struillou | Director General of Labour |
| Françoise Bouygard | Director of Research, Studies, and Statistics |
| Laurent Vilboeuf | Regional Director for Enterprises, Competition, Consumer Affairs, Labour, and Employment |

Members designated by trade unions and employers
| Full member | Alternate | Organization |
|---|---|---|
| Jean-François Pilliard | Sandra Aguettaz | MEDEF |
| Geneviève Roy | Georges Tissie | CGPME |
| Daniel Parent | Pierre Burban | UPA |
| Gérard Goupil | Marie-Françoise Gondard-Argenti | UNAPL |
| Claude Cochonneau | Anne-Sophie Forget | FNSEA |
| Gisèle Vidallet | Jacques Eliez | CGT |
| Marcel Grignard | Joëlle Delair | CFDT |
| Marie-Alice Medeuf Andrieu | Sandra Mitterrand | CGT-FO |
| Joseph Thouvenel | Bernard Sagez | CFTC |
| Jean-Michel Pecorini | Christiane Lefeuvre | CFE-CGC |

The composition of the council has been updated several times since 2014. The official website provides the most recent list.
