= Christian Education Federation =

The Christian Education Federation (Dutch: Christelijke Onderwijscentrale, COC) is a trade union representing teaching staff in Flanders.

The union was founded in 1993, when the Christian Union in Free Primary and Secondary Education merged with the Christian Union of Staff in Technical Colleges and the Christian Union of Staff Members in Government Education. Like all its predecessors, it affiliated to the Confederation of Christian Trade Unions, and by 1995 it had 37,031 members.

== Presidents ==
- 2000: Eric Dolfen
- 2015: Serge Vrancken
