= World Federation of Agricultural Workers =

Union for agricultural workers

The World Federation of Agricultural Workers (French: Fédération mondiale de travailleurs agricoles, FMTA) was a global union federation bringing together unions representing workers in agriculture industries.

The federation was established on 27 April 1921 at a meeting in The Hague. Initially named the International Federation of Christian Agricultural Workers' Unions, the federation affiliated to the International Federation of Christian Trade Unions.

By 1979, the federation's affiliates claimed a total of 3,397,000 members. In 1982, it merged with the World Federation of Workers in Food, Drink, Tobacco and Hotel Industries, to form the World Federation of Agriculture and Food Workers.

== Affiliates ==
The following unions were affiliated in 1979:

Union	Country
Accion Sindical Rural Argentina	Argentina
Federacion Unica de Sindicatos de Trabajadores Campesina	Argentina
Christian Union of Food and Agriculture Workers	Belgium
Federation of Peasants of Belize	Belize
Movement of Peasants of Belize	Belize
Fédération Beninoise des Travilleurs de la Terre et des Animateurs Ruraux	Benin
Federacion Sindical de Trabajadores Campesinos de Cochabamba	Bolivia
Acción Campesina Colombiana	Colombia
Federacion Campesina Cristiana Costarricense	Costa Rica
Dominican Landworkers' Movement	Dominica
Federacion Dominicana de Ligas Agrarias	Dominican Republic
Federacion Nacional de Organizaciones Campesinas	Ecuador
Central Campesina Salvadorena	El Salvador
General Federation of Agriculture	France
National Farmers' and General Workers' Union	Gambia
ALEB	West Germany
Mouvement Agricole de Guadeloupe	Guadeloupe
Federacion Campesina de Guatemala	Guatemala
Landworkers' Movement of Guyana	Guyana
Union Nacional Campesina	Honduras
Indian Confederation of Agricultural Workers	India
National Plantation, Agricultural and Allied Workers' Union of Liberia	Liberia
Féderation Nationale des Syndicats Chrétiens des Agricultures et Eleveurs	Madagascar
Mauritian Confederation of Workers and Labourers of the Sugar and Tea Industries	Mauritius
Comite Pro-Federacion Campesina de Mexico	Mexico
Federacion de Xtleros y Candelilleros de la Republica Mexicana	Mexico
Catholic Union of Agriculture, Food and Tobacco	Netherlands
Food Union	Netherlands
Federacion de Trabajadores Campesinos de Nicaragua	Nicaragua
Federation of Co-operative and Agricultural Workers' Unions of Nigeria	Nigeria
Federacion Nacional Campesina	Panama
Movimiento Campesino Paraguayo	Paraguay
Federacion Campesina del Peru	Peru
Movimiento Campesino de Suriname	Suriname
Secretaria Campesina de ASU	Uruguay
Confederacion Nacional Campesina de Venezuela	Venezuela

== Leadership ==
=== General Secretaries ===
Marcel Reynaert
M. D. den Hollander

=== Presidents ===
Age Ijska
1973: José Ramon Ranguel Parra
