= Christian Labour Association of Canada =

Canadian trade union

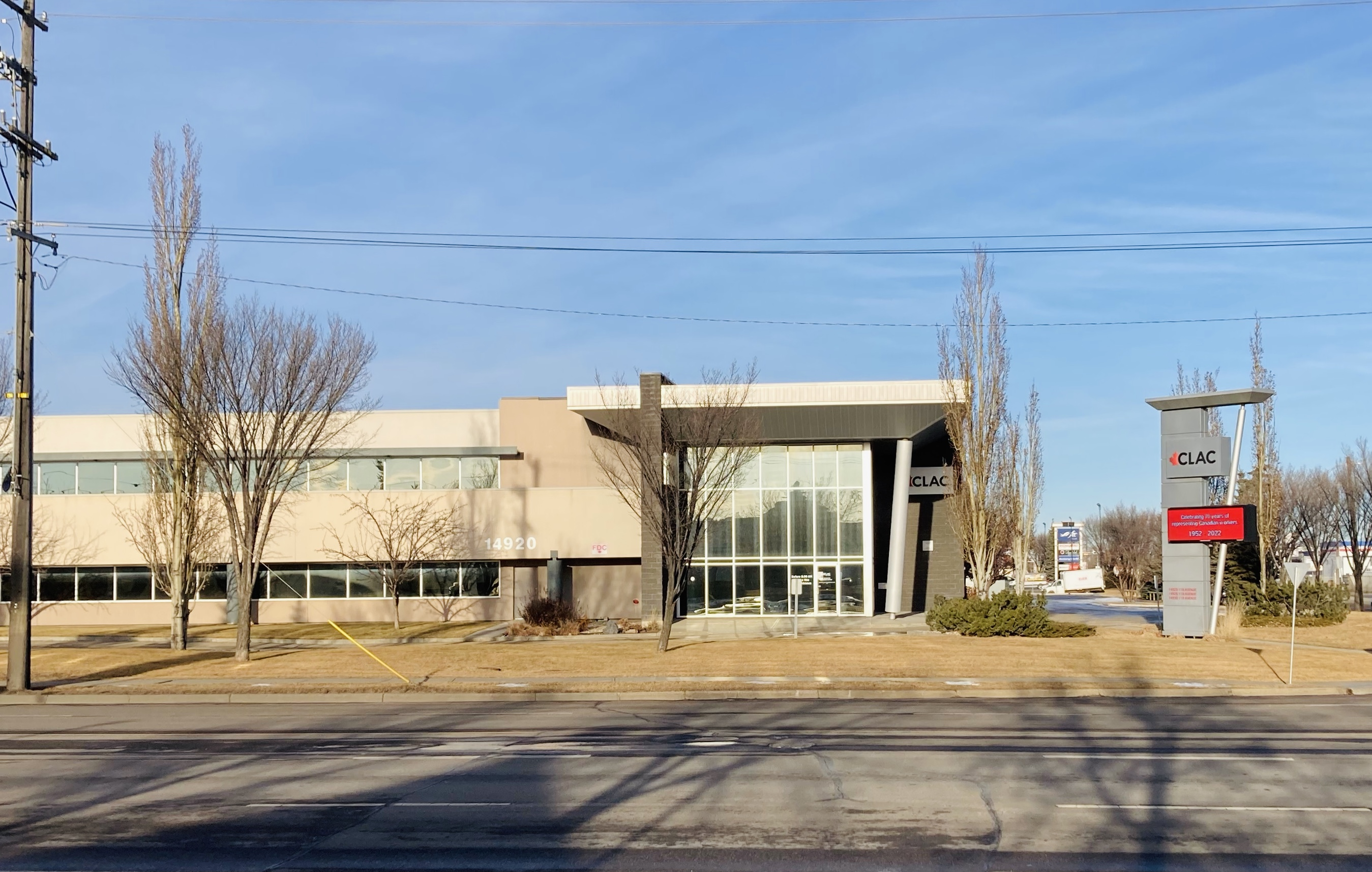
- Edmonton office
- Abbreviation: CLAC
- Formation: 1952; 74 years ago
- Type: Trade union
- Headquarters: Cambridge, Ontario, Canada
- Locations: Ontario, Canada; Western Canada
- Members: 65,986. (2015)
- Official language: English
- Executive director: Wayne Prins
- Affiliations: World Organization of Workers
- Website: clac.ca

The Christian Labour Association of Canada (CLAC) is a Canadian independent trade union founded in 1952 and headquartered in Cambridge, Ontario. It represents workers in a variety of sectors, including construction, healthcare, transportation, manufacturing, education, social services, hospitality, retail, and emergency services.

The organization traces its origins to a group of primarily Dutch immigrants who settled in Canada after the Second World War and sought a labour organization based on Christian social principles and freedom of association. Although CLAC was founded on Christian principles, membership is open to workers regardless of religious affiliation.

As of 2015, CLAC reported approximately 65,986 members. The union is not affiliated with the Canadian Labour Congress and has been affiliated with the World Organization of Workers since 2012.

CLAC has been the subject of debate within the Canadian labour movement. Academic researchers have characterized the organization as an example of accommodationist or company-oriented unionism, while labour relations boards in several Canadian jurisdictions have certified CLAC bargaining units and recognized the organization as an independent trade union.

== History ==
=== Origins and founding ===
The Christian Labour Association of Canada (CLAC) was founded on 20 February 1952 by a group of primarily Dutch immigrant workers who had settled in Canada following the Second World War. The organization was influenced by European Christian labour traditions, particularly those associated with the Dutch labour movement, and sought to promote labour relations based on principles of social justice, human dignity, stewardship, and freedom of association.

Unlike many labour organizations of the period, CLAC developed outside the mainstream Canadian labour movement and remained independent of what later became the Canadian Labour Congress. Although founded on Christian social principles, the organization did not restrict membership based on religious affiliation.

=== Certification disputes ===
During the 1950s, CLAC sought certification in several provinces but encountered resistance from labour boards and established trade unions. Labour relations authorities in Ontario expressed concerns that the organization's Christian foundation could result in discrimination against non-Christian workers, leading to repeated refusals to certify CLAC bargaining units.

In response, CLAC amended its constitution in 1959 to explicitly state that membership and representation were available regardless of religious belief. The union also revised several constitutional provisions to address concerns raised by labour boards and courts.

=== Ontario court decision ===
A major turning point occurred in 1963 when the Ontario High Court of Justice reviewed the refusal of the Ontario Labour Relations Board to certify CLAC Local 52. In a decision written by Chief Justice James Chalmers McRuer, the court found that the board had improperly relied on irrelevant evidence and had misapplied anti-discrimination principles in evaluating the union's application.

The ruling established that CLAC's constitution and practices were not discriminatory and directed that the board's decision be set aside. Labour historians and scholars have identified the decision as a significant development in CLAC's history because it enabled the organization to obtain certifications in Ontario and expand its activities nationally.

=== Growth and expansion ===
Following the 1963 court decision, CLAC gradually expanded its presence in construction, manufacturing, transportation, healthcare, and service industries across Canada. By the early twenty-first century, the organization had become one of Canada's largest independent trade unions, with a concentration of members in Alberta, British Columbia, Ontario, Saskatchewan, and Manitoba.

The union's growth, organizational model, and relationship with employers have remained subjects of debate within Canadian labour relations. Supporters have described CLAC as an alternative form of worker representation emphasizing cooperation and freedom of association, while critics have characterized it as an accommodationist or company-oriented union.

== Organization and labour relations ==
=== Collective bargaining approach ===
CLAC's approach to collective bargaining has been characterized by labour scholars as distinct from the more adversarial traditions associated with many unions affiliated with the Canadian Labour Congress. The organization has historically emphasized cooperation between workers and employers and has promoted principles of freedom of association and union pluralism within Canadian labour relations.

According to labour researchers Steven Tufts and Mark Thomas, CLAC's approach to labour relations has contributed both to its organizational growth and to continuing debate regarding its role within the Canadian labour movement.

=== Membership and representation ===
CLAC represents workers in a variety of sectors, including construction, healthcare, transportation, manufacturing, education, social services, hospitality, retail, and emergency services. Membership is concentrated in Alberta, British Columbia, Ontario, Saskatchewan, and Manitoba.

As of 2015, Employment and Social Development Canada reported that CLAC represented approximately 65,986 members.

=== Training and benefits ===
Through collective agreements negotiated with employers, CLAC members participate in a range of benefit programs, including pension plans, disability insurance, extended health coverage, apprenticeship support, and training initiatives.

The organization supports training centres and apprenticeship programs in several provinces, particularly within the skilled trades and construction sectors.

=== Labour movement affiliations ===
CLAC is not affiliated with the Canadian Labour Congress (CLC), Canada's largest labour federation.

In 2011, the International Trade Union Confederation (ITUC) suspended CLAC's membership after concluding that aspects of the union's policies and activities undermined labour conditions.

CLAC disputed the decision and maintained that its model reflected principles of union pluralism and worker freedom of association.

In 2012, CLAC withdrew from the ITUC and joined the World Organization of Workers (WOW).

== Reception and criticism ==
Academic researchers and labour organizations have debated CLAC's role within the Canadian labour movement for several decades. Labour scholars Steven Tufts and Mark Thomas describe CLAC as occupying a distinctive position between traditional trade unionism and accommodationist labour relations models.

Some unions and labour organizations have characterized CLAC as a company-oriented union, arguing that its bargaining practices and relationships with employers differ from those of unions affiliated with the Canadian Labour Congress.

Critics have also pointed to instances in which labour boards reviewed employer-assisted certification campaigns involving CLAC. In a 2018 decision involving Best Service Pros Ltd., the British Columbia Labour Relations Board found that employer conduct had improperly influenced employee support for CLAC and set aside the resulting collective agreement.

CLAC disputes characterizations that it functions as a company union and has pointed to numerous certifications granted by labour relations boards across Canada. Courts and labour boards have recognized CLAC as an independent trade union and have rejected allegations that it is employer-dominated.

The debate surrounding CLAC has been described by labour scholars as reflecting broader disagreements within Canadian labour relations regarding union pluralism, organizing models, employer relations, and worker representation.

== International work ==
CLAC has been providing financial aid to workers around the world. Through the CLAC Foundation, the efforts and ability to aid struggling workers and their families have been expanded. Now, CLAC, its members, signatory companies, and the general public can donate to various causes through the foundation. Projects include providing training for tradespeople in areas hit by natural disasters, supporting the China Labour Bulletin, helping workers in Canada prepare to re-enter the workforce, and raising awareness about the issues affecting workers around the world.

== Locals ==
=== Construction ===
- Construction Workers Local 6 (CLAC) represents construction workers in south-central and south-western Ontario. It was formed in 1960 as part of CTUC and merged with CLAC in 1979.
- Construction Workers Local 52 (CLAC) represents construction workers in Ontario, primarily north and east of Toronto. It was formed in 1960.
- Construction Workers Local 53 (CLAC) represents construction workers in and around Windsor, Sarnia, Chatham, and London, Ontario. It was formed in 1962.
- Construction Workers Union Local 63 (CLAC) represents construction workers throughout Alberta. It is CLAC's largest local and was formed in 1966. In 2002, Construction Workers Association Local 65 was merged with Local 63.
- General and Allied Workers Union Local 67 (CLAC) represents construction workers in the Lower Mainland of British Columbia. It was formed in 1972 under the name Metal, Transport & Warehouse Employees Association Local No. 67.
- Construction and Allied Workers' Union Local 68 (CLAC) represents construction workers in British Columbia. It was formed in 1973.
- Construction Workers Local 150 (CLAC) represents construction workers in Ontario, primarily in St. Catharines. It was formed in 1975.
- Construction Workers Union Local 151 (CLAC) represents construction workers in Saskatchewan. It was formed in 1984 but became dormant in 1992 when the government of Saskatchewan disallowed all unions, except for certain trade unions, from representing workers in the construction industry. Local 151 was re-certified in 2010 once the restrictions were struck down by Bill 80.
- Construction Workers Union Local 152 (CLAC) represents construction workers in Manitoba. It was formed in 1986.

=== Manufacturing and transportation ===
- Logistics, Manufacturing and Allied Trades Union Local 56 (CLAC) represents transportation and manufacturing workers, primarily in Alberta. It was established in 1964 under the name Edson Truck Drivers and Warehousemen Association No. 56 and Transport, Warehousemen and Allied Trades Association No. 56.
- Transport, Construction and General Employees Association Local 66 (CLAC) primarily represents transportation, warehouse, and dock workers in British Columbia. It was formed in 1971.
- Manufacturing, Transportation & Allied Workers Union Local 519 (CLAC) represents manufacturing workers in Chatham, Ontario. It was formed in 2001.
- British Columbia Transportation and Warehousing Association, Local 402 (CLAC) represents workers in transportation and warehousing in British Columbia. It was formed in 2012.

=== Healthcare, education, and service ===
- Health Care and Service Employee' Union Local 301 (CLAC) represents healthcare workers, service workers, and voice-over professionals in Alberta. It was formed in 1983.
- Niagara Health Care and Service Workers Union Local 302 (CLAC) represents healthcare and service workers in the Niagara region of Ontario. It was formed in 1988.
- Southwestern Ontario Health Care and Service Workers Union local 303 (CLAC) represents healthcare, home care, child care, and service workers, primarily in and around London and Chatham, Ontario. It was formed in 2001.
- Health Care and Service Workers Union Local 304 (CLAC) represents healthcare, home care, and service workers in south-central Ontario. It was formed in 2001.
- Grand River Valley Health Care Employees Union Local 305 (CLAC) represents retirement and nursing home workers in and around Hamilton, Brantford, Cambridge, and Stratford, Ontario. It was formed in 2005.
- Service, Health and Allied Workers Union, Local 501 (CLAC) represents retirement, healthcare, social service, hospitality, manufacturing, and service workers in British Columbia. It was formed in 1975.
- Education, Service, and Health Care Union Local 306 (CLAC) represents education assistants, custodians, and grocery workers near Steinbach and Winkler, Manitoba. It was formed in 2007.
- Independent Educators Association, Local 62 (CLAC)

=== Volunteer firefighters ===
- Greater Hamilton Volunteer Firefighters Association Local 911 (CLAC) represents volunteer firefighters in Hamilton, Ontario. It was formed in 2004.
- Eastern Ontario Volunteer Firefighters Association Local 920 (CLAC) represents volunteer firefighters in Belleville and Quinte West, Ontario. It was formed in 2005.

=== Other ===
- General Workers Union Local 504 (CLAC) represents workers in Saskatchewan. It was formed in 2010.
- Security and Service Workers Union, Local 503 (CLAC) represents security workers in Hamilton, Ontario. It was formed in 1999.
- CLAC Local 1 is a local for CLAC retirees. It was formed in 2012.

== See also ==
- Cardus
- Christian Reformed Church in North America
