= Cardus =

Canadian think tank

- Cardus Institute
- Formation: 1974
- Type: Think tank
- Headquarters: Hamilton, Ontario, Canada
- Chief executive officer: Michael Van Pelt
- Chair: Pamela Shaw
- Website: cardus.ca
- Formerly called: Work Research Foundation

The Cardus Institute is a Christian think tank based in Hamilton, Ontario. It was founded in 1974 as the Work Research Foundation. Through a variety of research, publishing, and programmatic activities, the organization advocates for religion and the role of faith in Canadian society. Its publications have included Cardus Policy in Public, Comment, Convivium, and LexView. It also runs events and conferences. In 2010, the Centre for Cultural Renewal, another think tank, merged into Cardus.

== See also ==
- Center for Public Justice
- Christian Labour Association of Canada
- Christian Reformed Church in North America
