= François Chérèque =

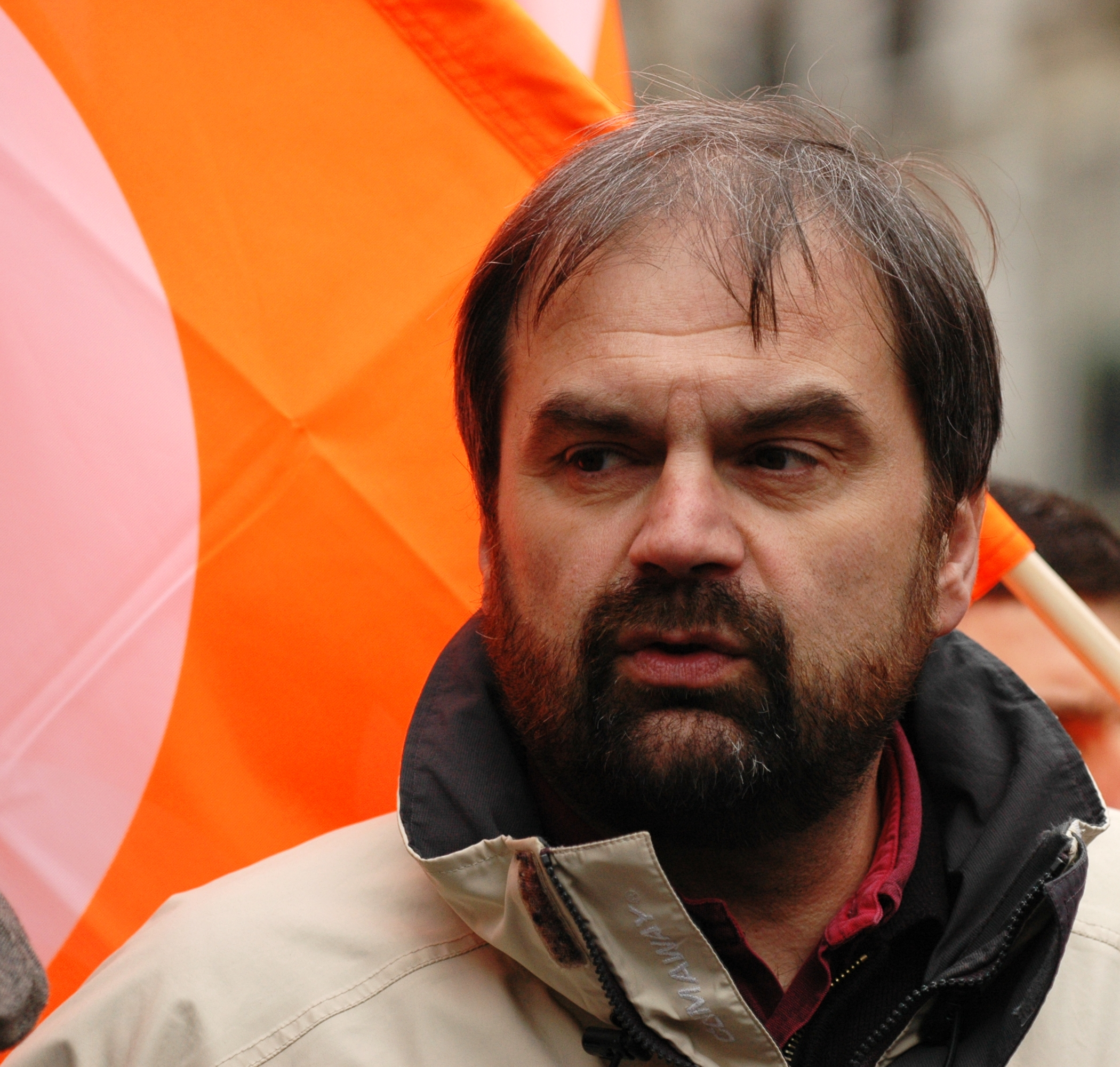
- François Chérèque in 2006

General Secretary of the CFDT
- In office 2002–2012
- Preceded by: Nicole Notat
- Succeeded by: Laurent Berger

Personal details
- Born: 1 June 1956 Nancy, France
- Died: 2 January 2017 (aged 60) Paris, France
- Education: Lycée Notre-Dame Saint-Sigisbert

François Chérèque (1 June 1956 – 2 January 2017) was a French trade unionist, and leader of the French trade union CFDT (French Democratic Confederation of Labour or Confédération française démocratique du travail).

== Early life ==
François Chérèque was born in Nancy department of Lorraine. His father, Jacques Chérèque, served as the vice-president of the CFDT. His brother, Marc Chérèque, went on to serve as the President, since 2005, of FC Grenoble. Another brother was vice-president from 2009 to 2011 of Amadeus IT Group.

Chérèque went to the Lycée Notre-Dame Saint-Sigisbert in Nancy earning his Baccalauréat, leaving in 1975.

== Career ==
Chérèque worked for a hospital in Puteaux in Paris, then worked at a hospital in Digne-les-Bains, in the Provence-Alpes-Côte d'Azur region of south-east France.

Chérèque was the leader (secrétaire général) of the CFDT from 2002 until 28 November 2012. He succeeded Nicole Notat. During his tenure, he negotiated in favour of pensions for public sector workers. He was succeeded by Laurent Berger.

Chérèque served as the president of PS Terra Nova, a think tank, from 2012 to 2016.

== Death ==
Chérèque died of leukemia on 2 January 2017 aged 60.

== Works ==
- Chérèque, François (2002). Qu'est-ce que la CFDT?. Paris: Archipel. ISBN 9782841874262. OCLC 401657789.
- Chérèque, François (2005). Réformiste et impatient!. Paris: Seuil. ISBN 9782020798846. OCLC 419539801.
- Barjon, Carole; Chérèque, François (2008). Si on me cherche…. Paris: Albin Michel. ISBN 9782226186812. OCLC 253376211.
- Chérèque, François (2011). Patricia, Romain, Nabila et les autres : le travail, entre souffrances et fierté. Paris: Albin Michel. ISBN 9782226230560. OCLC 780275007.
- L'Avenir de la lutte contre la pauvreté. Les Carnets des dialogues du matin. Paris: Institut Diderot. 2014. ISBN 979-10-93704-02-9..
