= Philippe Frémeaux =

French economic journalist (1949–2020)

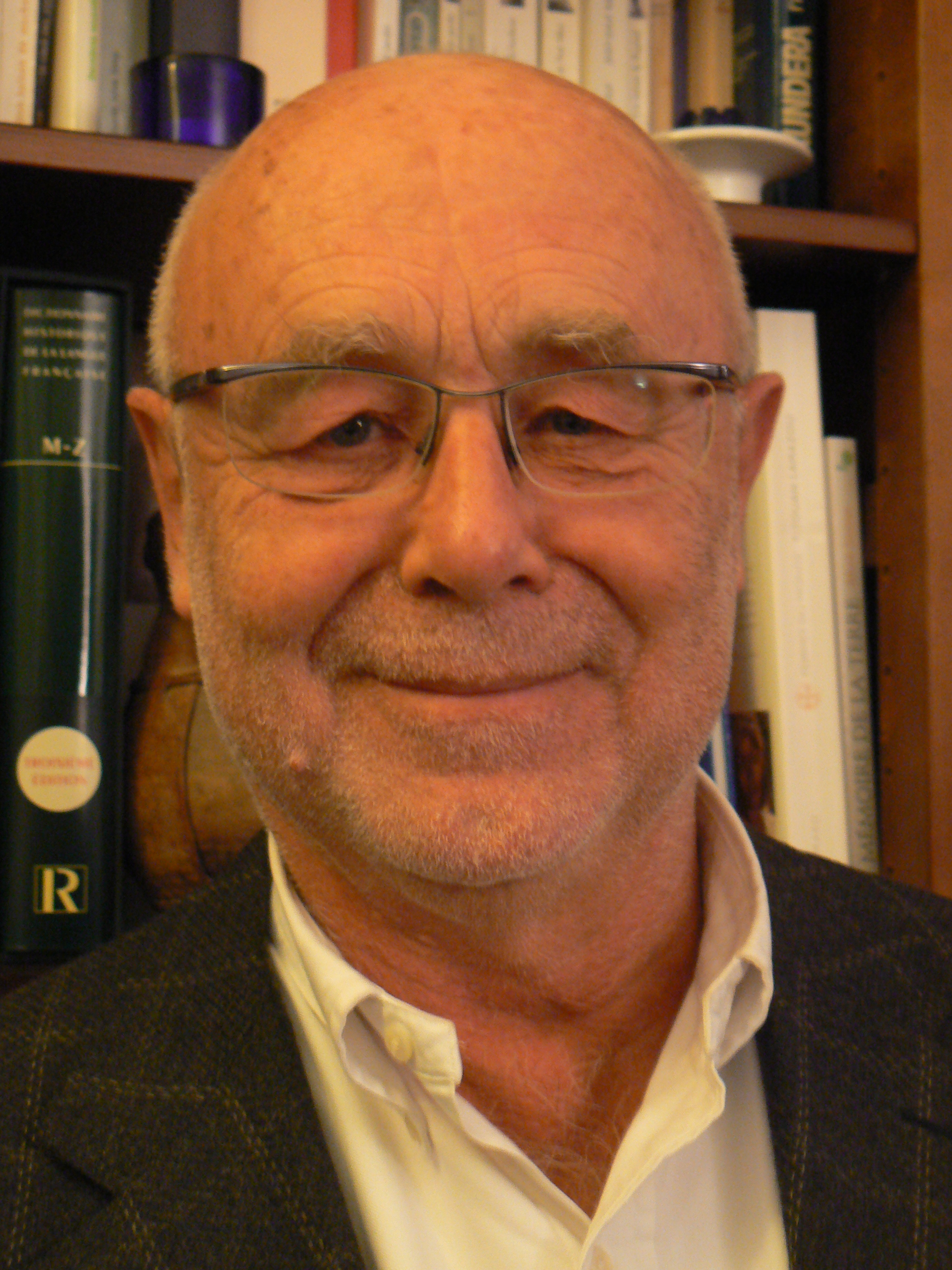
- A portrait of Philippe Frémeaux
- Born: 1 October 1949; Villemomble, France
- Died: 3 August 2020 (aged 70)
- Occupation: Journalist

Philippe Frémeaux (1 October 1949 – 3 August 2020) was a French economic journalist with the magazine Alternatives économiques.

== Biography ==
After his studies in economic science, public rights, and political science, Frémeaux pursued a career in teaching, journalism, and consulting. He first worked as a professor of social sciences and economics at Sciences Po from 1975 to 1983. He was also a lecturer at CELSA Paris in the 2000s. As a consultant, Frémeaux worked for Le BIPE from 1983 to 1999, where he led numerous advisory missions for the French Ministry of Industry and the European Commission.

As a journalist, Frémeaux contributed to Le Monde from 1979 to 1983. He then joined the writing staff of Alternatives économiques, a monthly magazine with which he voluntarily contributed. In 1988, he became editor-in-chief, and then succeeded Denis Clerc as head of the company which oversees the magazine from 1999 to 2012. After he left this position, he continued to contribute to Alternatives économiques. He became President of the Veblen Institute in 2010. In addition to Le Monde and Alternatives économiques, Frémeaux has also contributed to France Info and France Culture, notably on the program C dans l'air.

Philippe Frémeaux died on 3 August 2020 at the age of 70.

== Bibliography ==
- Comprendre l'économie soviétique (1985)
- Sortir du piège - la gauche face à la mondialisation (1999)
- Petit dictionnaire des mots de la crise (2009)
- La nouvelle alternative ? Enquête sur l'économie sociale et solidaire (2011)
- Et si on aimait enfin l'école ! (2012)
- Vingt idées reçues sur les métiers, l'emploi et le travail (2012)
- Transition écologique, mode d'emploi, (2014)
- Produire plus, polluer moins : l'impossible découplage ? (2014)
- Réinventer le progrès, Entretiens avec Laurent Berger et Pascal Canfin (2016)
- Après Macron (2018)
