= Communication, Consulting, Culture Federation =

Trade union of France

The Communication, Consulting, Culture Federation (French: Fédération communication conseil culture, F3C) is a trade union representing workers in various white collar industries in France.

The union was founded in 2005, when the Federation of Post and Telecoms merged with the Federation of Communication and Culture. The Business Services section of the Services Federation also joined. Like its predecessors, the union affiliated to the French Democratic Confederation of Labour. By 2017, the union claimed 43,666 members.

== General Secretaries ==
2005: Hervé Morland
2011: Ivan Béraud
2016: Marie-Hélène Castellarnau
2017: Jérôme Morin
