= International Federation for the Graphical Industries =

The International Federation for the Graphical Industries (French: Fédération internationale des industries graphiques, FIIG) was a global union federation bring together trade unions representing printing workers.

The federation was founded in 1925, at a meeting in Antwerp, as the International Federation of Christian Trade Unions of Graphical and Paper Industries. It affiliated to the International Federation of Christian Trade Unions. One of its smaller affiliates, its affiliates had a total of only 18,515 members in 1929, and 36,000 in 1979.

On 14 October 1985, the federation merged with the International Federation of Christian Miners' Unions, the World Federation for the Metallurgic Industry, and the World Federation of Energy, Chemical and Various Industry Workers' Unions, forming the World Federation of Industry Workers.

== Affiliates ==
The following unions were affiliated in 1979:

Union	Country
Christian Fraction of the Union of Printing, Journalism, and Paper	Austria
Christian Union of Printing and Paper Enterprises	Belgium
Dutch Catholic Printing Union	Netherlands
Swiss Graphical Union	Switzerland

== Leadership ==
=== General Secretaries ===
W. Leo de Zwager
P. A. M. van Buul

=== Presidents ===
Emile de Bondt
G. Mot
