= Confederation of Christian Trade Unions =

Belgian trade union

Confederation of Christian Trade Unions ACV-CSC
- Confederation of Christian Trade Unions
- Algemeen Christelijk Vakverbond; Confédération des syndicats chrétiens
- Founded: 1904
- Headquarters: Brussels, Belgium
- Location: Belgium
- Members: 1.6 million
- Key people: Ann Vermorgen, president Marie-Hélène Ska, secretary general
- Affiliations: ITUC, ETUC, TUAC
- Website: www.acv-csc.be

The Confederation of Christian Trade Unions (Dutch: Algemeen Christelijk Vakverbond, or ACV; French: Confédération des syndicats chrétiens, CSC) is the largest of Belgium's three trade union federations.

== History ==
The federation was founded in 1904, but can trace its origins to the "Anti-Socialist Cotton Workers' Union" founded in 1886. The organisation took its current name in 1923.

Today the ACV/CSC has 22 regional federation and 16 sectoral unions, with a membership of 1.7 million (almost 16% of the total Belgian population). The president is currently Ann Vermorgen and the secretary general is Marie-Hélène Ska.

== Affiliates ==
The union's affiliates are:

Union	Abbreviation	Founded
Christian Education Federation	COC	1993
Christian Teachers' Association	COV	1893
Construction Industry and Energy	BIE	2010
Food and Services Union	Voeding en Diensten	1919
Metea	Metea	2009
Public Services	Openbare Diensten	1922
Puls	Puls	1934
Transcom	Transcom	2001
Sporta-vsb		

=== Former affiliates ===
Union	Abbreviation	Founded	Reason not affiliated	Year	Membership (1953)
Christian Union of Belgian Metalworkers	CCMB	1912	Merged into Metea	2009	60,000
Christian Union of Belgian Textile and Clothing Workers	CCTKB	1903	Merged into Metea	2009	100,000
Christian Union of Building and Industry		1998	Merged into BIE	2010	N/A
Christian Union of Communication and Culture	CVCC	1919	Merged into Transcom	2001	26,800
Christian Union of Diamond Workers			Merged into VD	1983	6,000
Christian Union of Energy, Chemical and Leather Industries	CCECL	1912	Merged into CMECL	1988	8,000
Christian Union Federation of Teachers	COV	1990	Merged into COC	1993	26,125
Christian Union of Mining, Energy, Chemicals and Leather	CMECL	1988	Merged into BIE	2010	N/A
Christian Union of Printing and Paper Enterprises	CGP	1905	Merged into CCDI	1988	7,417
Christian Union of Staff in Free Secondary and Primary Education	CPVD	1949	Dissolved	1990	
Christian Union of Staff in Technical Colleges	CCOD	1919	Dissolved	1990	2,650
Christian Union of Staff in Technical Colleges - Flemish	CCPTO	1990	Merged into COC	1993	N/A
Christian Union of Transport Workers	CCV	1906	Merged into VD	1983	23,100
Christian Union of Transport and Diamond Workers	VD	1983	Merged into Transcom	2001	N/A
Christian Union of Various Industries	CCDI	1988	Merged into Building and Industry	1998	N/A
Christian Union of Woodworkers and Building Workers	CHB	1921	Merged into Building and Industry	1998	108,000
Christian Workers' Union in Stone, Cement, Ceramics, and Glass Production	CSCCG	1910	Merged into CCDI	1988	1,200
National Union of Employees	CNE	1980			43,474
National Union of Flemish Employees	LBC	1980			
Union of Free Miners	CMV	1906	Merged into CMECL	1988	11,545

== Leadership ==
=== Presidents ===
1912: Gustaaf Eylenbosch
1914: Hendrik Heyman
1919: René Debruyne
1921: Evarist Van Quaquebeke
1923: René Debruyne
1932: Henri Pauwels
1946: August Cool
1968: Jef Houthuys
1987: Willy Peirens
1999: Luc Cortebeeck
2012: Marc Leemans
2023: Ann Vermorgen

=== General Secretaries ===
1912: Georges Rutten
1919: Evarist Van Quaquebeke
1921: Henri Pauwels
1932: August Cool
1946: Louis Dereau
1973: Robert D'Hondt
1991: Josly Piette
2006: Claude Rolin
2014: Marie-Hélène Ska

== See also ==
- Het Volk (newspaper)

== Sources ==
- Neuville, Jean (1988). La CSC en l'an 40. La déchirement et la difficile reconstruction de l'unité. Vie ouvrière.
