= FIIG Securities =

FIIG Securities Limited
- Company type: Private
- Industry: Finance
- Founded: 1998
- Headquarters: Australia
- Key people: Jim Stening, Founder
- Products: Money Manager and Fixed Income Investment Firm
- Number of employees: Approx. 70
- Website: Official website

FIIG Securities Limited (FIIG) is an investment firm headquartered in Sydney, Australia with regional offices in Melbourne, Brisbane and Perth. The company was founded in 1998 as one of the first firms to provide investors with direct access to fixed income markets, growing to become the largest independent fixed income specialist in Australia with billions of dollars under advice. The company focuses on cash, term deposits, short-term money market securities and corporate bonds.
