= International Federation of Trade Unions of Transport Workers =

- Fédération Internationale des Organisations Syndicales du Personnel des Transports
- Founded: 1921
- Dissolved: 2006
- Headquarters: 31 rue de Treves, Brussels
- Location: International
- Affiliations: World Confederation of Labour

The International Federation of Trade Unions of Transport Workers (French: Fédération Internationale des Organisations Syndicales du Personnel des Transports, FIOST) was an International Trade Federation affiliated to the World Confederation of Labour (WCL).

== History ==
The federation was established in 1921 at a conference in Lucerne, as the International Federation of Christian Trade Unions of Railway, Tramway and Other Transport Workers. In 1955, it renamed itself as the International Federation of Christian Trade Unions of Transport Workers, and then in 1970 it dropped "Christian", to assume its final name.

In 2006, the WCL merged into the new International Trade Union Confederation, and FIOST dissolved, its former affiliates mostly joining the International Transport Workers' Federation.

The federation had four sections, covering aviation, railways, waterways, and road transport.

== Affiliates ==
In 1979, the federation claimed 50 affiliates, of which 21 were indirectly affiliated through the Latin American Federation of Transport Workers. The other affiliates were:

Union	Country
Christian Fraction of the Commerce and Transport Union	Austria
Christian Fraction of the Railway Workers' Union	Austria
Christian Union of Communication	Belgium
Christian Union of Transport Workers	Belgium
Public Services	Belgium
General Federation of Transport	France
National Federation of Housing, Equipment and Transport	France
Railway Workers' Federation	France
Seafarers' Federation	France
Christian Union of German Railway Workers	West Germany
Federation of Christian Transport Workers	Luxembourg
Dutch Catholic Union of Transport Personnel	Netherlands
Transport Union	Netherlands
Christian Union of Transport, Military and Customs	Switzerland

== Leadership ==
=== General Secretaries ===
1921: H. F. Timmermans
1940s: Vaassen
Jan van der Elst
1980s: Alfred Gosselin
Freddy Pools

=== Presidents ===
1921: F. L. D. Nivard
1940s: de Clerq
1950s: A. Meeuwissen
Antoine de Barbara
Benoit de Smet
1980s: John Janssens
Michel Bovy
