= Food and Services Union =

The Food and Services Union (Dutch: Voeding en Diensten, French: Alimentation et Services) is a trade union representing workers in various industries in Belgium.

The union was founded in April 1919 and affiliated to the Confederation of Christian Trade Unions. It initially had 511 members from a wide variety of small companies.

From the 1970s, the union began representing workers in security and cleaning, and from 2004 workers in the service voucher industry, which soon became its largest sector. As of 1995, the union had 178,429 members.
