= World Organization of Workers =

WOW
- World Organization of Workers
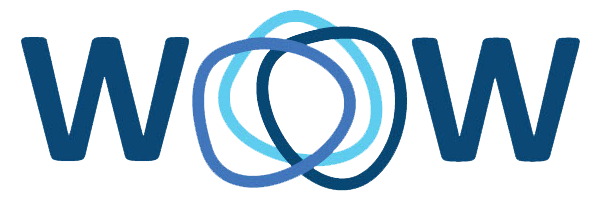
- Founded: September 1921
- Location: International
- Members: 1.3 million in 60 countries
- Key people: President: Wayne Prins (Canada); Treasurer: Rolf Weber (Denmark); Vice-President: Mikael Arendt Laursen (Denmark); Vice-President (Europe): Wolfgang Pischinger (Austria); Vice-President (Latin America – FELATRABS): Arturo Fabián Quiñoa (Argentina); Vice-President (Latin America – FELATRACCS): Roberto Mejía Alarcón (Peru); Vice-President (Latin America – FETRALCOS): Fermín Víctor Carricarte (Argentina); Vice-President (Africa – FPE): Koffi Chrysanthe Zounnadjala Agbogbe (Togo); Vice-President (Asia – WOW-Asia): Nicetas M. Lucero (Philippines); Executive Secretary: Bjørn Anders van Heusden (Netherlands)
- Website: www.wow-world.org

The World Organization of Workers (WOW) is an international trade union federation.

== History ==
WOW was founded in September 1921, as the International Federation of Christian Employees' Trade Unions. After several name changes, it became the World Federation of Clerical Workers (WFCW). The WFCW joined the International Federation of Christian Trade Unions (IFCTU), which was later called the World Confederation of Labour (WCL). On October 31, 2006, the WCL was dissolved when it joined with the International Confederation of Free Trade Unions to form the International Trade Union Confederation (ITUC). Rather than join ITUC, the WFCW decided to function as an independent trade union federation under the name World Organization of Workers (WOW).

== Malta World Congress ==
WOW held its first World Congress from November 2 to 9, 2008, in Malta. It was at this conference that the name World Organization of Workers (WOW) was formally adopted. Also at this conference two resolutions were adopted. The first resolution dealt with Social dialogue, International Labour Standards and Social Justice. The second resolution promoted a new balance within corporate governance structures.

== Organization and leadership ==
Currently, 130 trade unions are affiliated with WOW, representing 1.3 million workers from 60 nations. The president is Wayne Prins, the executive director of the Christian Labour Association of Canada (CLAC). WOW's headquarters are in Brussels, Belgium.

The federation's 2019 congress was attended by the following unions:

- ASIPA (Spain)
- CFTL (Portugal)
- CGB (Germany)
- KOK (Czech Republic)
- CNV (Netherlands)
- FCG (Austria)
- Krifa (Denmark)
- Solidarity (Poland)
- SS Bofos (Serbia)
- Vost "Volya" (Ukraine)
- Voice (United Kingdom)
- Christian Labour Association of Canada (Canada)

As of 2025, the World Board comprises:

- President: Wayne Prins (Canada)
- Treasurer: Rolf Weber (Denmark)
- Vice-President: Mikael Arendt Laursen (Denmark)
- Vice-President (Europe): Wolfgang Pischinger (Austria)
- Vice-President (Latin America – FELATRABS): Arturo Fabián Quiñoa (Argentina)
- Vice-President (Latin America – FELATRACCS): Roberto Mejía Alarcón (Peru)
- Vice-President (Latin America – FETRALCOS): Fermín Víctor Carricarte (Argentina)
- Vice-President (Africa – FPE): Koffi Chrysanthe Zounnadjala Agbogbe (Togo)
- Vice-President (Asia – WOW-Asia): Nicetas M. Lucero (Philippines)
- Executive Secretary: Bjørn Anders van Heusden (Netherlands)

"World board". World Organization of Workers.

== Structure ==
The WOW Congress meets every 4 years, consisting of delegates of affiliated organizations. The European Council meets every 4 years, between the sessions of the WOW Congress. The European Council consists of at least one representative of each European member organization. The World Board meets annually, consisting of at least 6 Vice-Presidents, Treasurer and the World-President. The European Board meets at least 4 times a year.

== See also ==
- List of federations of trade unions
