= Poujols =

- Commune
- Location of Poujols
- Location within France Location within Occitanie
- Coordinates: 43°45′55″N 3°19′30″E
- Country: France
- Region: Occitania
- Department: Hérault
- Arrondissement: Lodève
- Canton: Lodève
- Intercommunality: Lodévois – Larzac

Government
  - Mayor (2020–2026): Antoine Goutelle
- Area^{1}: 2.86 km^{2} (1.10 sq mi)
- Elevation: 250 m (820 ft)
- Highest elevation: 652 m (2,139 ft)
- Lowest elevation: 192 m (630 ft)
- Population (2023): 190
  - Density: 66/km^{2} (170/sq mi)
- Time zone: UTC+01:00 (CET)
  - Summer (DST): UTC+02:00 (CEST)
- INSEE/Postal code: 34212 /34700
- ^{1} French Land Register data, which excludes lakes, ponds, glaciers > 1 km^{2} (0.386 sq mi or 247 acres) and river estuaries.

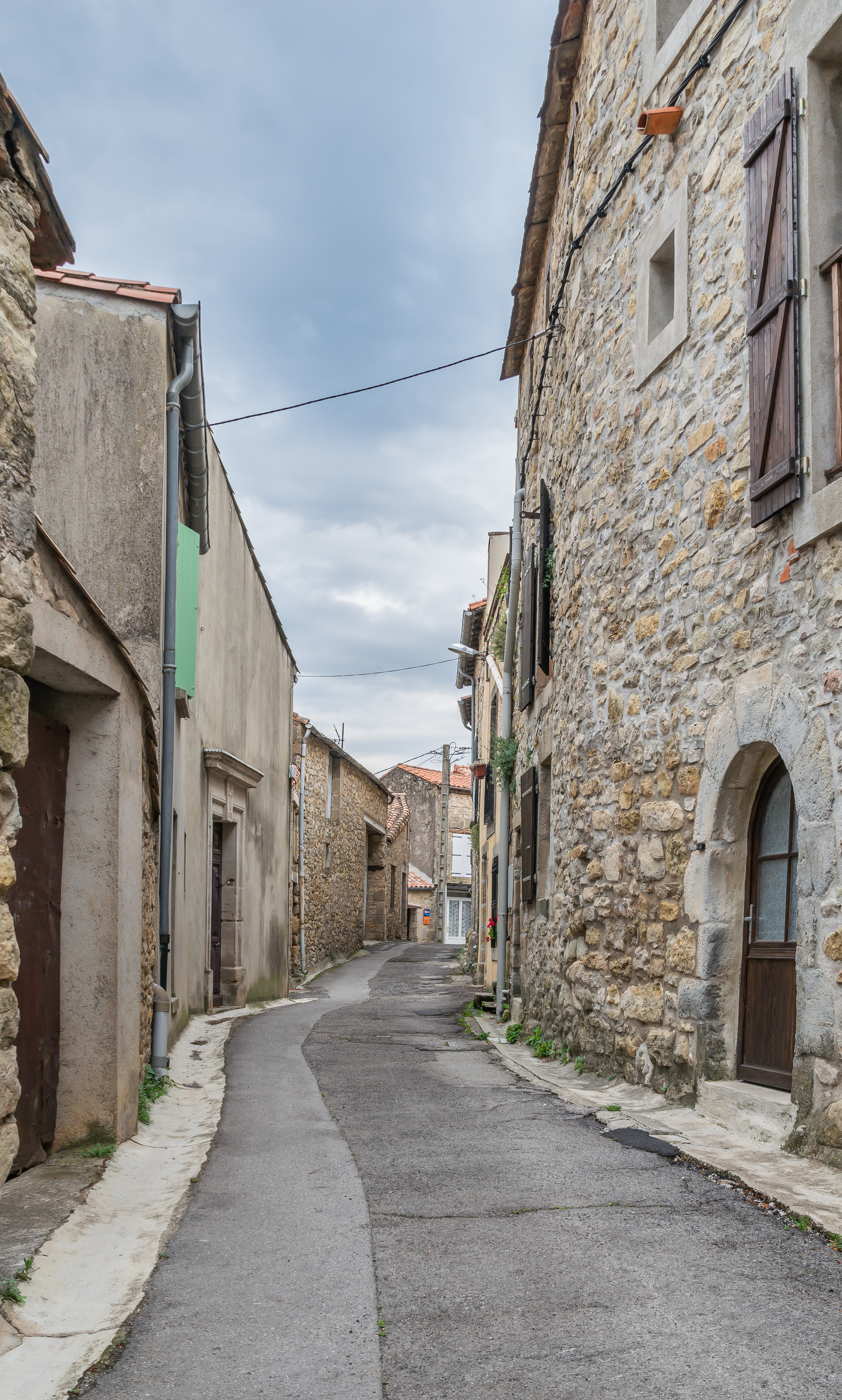
Grand Rue in Poujols.jpg

Poujols is a commune in the Hérault department in the Occitanie region in southern France.

== Population ==
The town reached peak population in the middle of the 19th century, dwindled to a low following the Second World War, but has seen some growth in the early 21st century.

Historical population

Year	Pop.	±% p.a.
1793	267	—
1821	288	+0.27%
1846	297	+0.12%
1872	242	−0.78%
1901	174	−1.13%
1926	131	−1.13%
1946	115	−0.65%
1954	98	−1.98%
1962	113	+1.80%

Year	Pop.	±% p.a.
1968	105	−1.22%
1975	113	+1.05%
1982	120	+0.86%
1990	127	+0.71%
1999	125	−0.18%
2007	156	+2.81%
2012	150	−0.78%
2017	164	+1.80%
2023	190	+2.48%

Source: EHESS and INSEE (1968–2023)

== See also ==
- Communes of the Hérault department
