= World Confederation of Labour =

International labour organization

WCL/CMT
- World Confederation of Labour
- Merged into: ITUC
- Founded: 19 June 1920
- Dissolved: 31 October 2006
- Headquarters: Brussels, Belgium
- Location: International
- Members: 26 million in 116 countries
- Affiliations: International
- Website: www.cmt-wcl.org

The World Confederation of Labour (WCL) was an international labour organization founded in 1920 and based in Europe. Fascist governments of the 1930s repressed the federation and imprisoned many of its leaders, limiting operations until the end of World War II. In 2006 it became part of the International Trade Union Confederation (ITUC), ending its existence as an independent organization.

== History ==
=== Founding ===
The WCL was founded in The Hague in 1920 under the name of the International Federation of Christian Trade Unions (IFCTU) as a confederation of trade unions associated with the Christian Democratic parties of Europe. Originally catering to Roman Catholic constituencies, the IFCTU was designed to provide an alternative to the secular trade unions in Europe at the time, basing its foundation on the Rerum novarum and the Quadragesimo anno.

The first statutes adopted by the group proclaimed its intention to struggle not only for workers' labour rights, but also values like human dignity, democracy, and international solidarity. Jos Serrarens became the first secretary-general of the IFCTU; Joseph Scherrer was its first president.

=== Rise of fascism and World War II ===
In the late 1920s, global economic tumult compounded the growth of authoritarian governments in Europe, which the IFCTU opposed. In response, German officials of the 1930s sent the group's leaders to Nazi concentration camps, and Benito Mussolini banned its Italian affiliate.

During World War II, German forces occupying The Netherlands destroyed the organization's secretariat, and it became inactive until 1945. The federation had difficulty renewing ties with most of its affiliates in Eastern Europe after the end of the war.

=== Cold War era ===
When the World Federation of Trade Unions (WFTU) was founded in September 1945, it invited the IFCTU to join. Delegates to an October congress in Brussels voted to reject the invitation, on the grounds that the WFTU's global unity was "too artificial".

The matter of affiliation with the International Confederation of Free Trade Unions (ICFTU) is in dispute. The website of the WCL reports that it "preferred to remain independent," particularly in order to criticize both capitalist and communist abuses. However, according to the International Institute of Social History, member unions of the ICFTU were opposed to affiliating with the Christian organization.

=== WCL reformation ===
In the late 1950s, the IFCTU found itself working more frequently with Muslim and Buddhist workers in Asia and Africa. In 1959, the IFCTU convened a seminar in Saigon to determine the possibilities for points of unity among world religions in matters of social behaviour.

In 1968, delegates to the organization's 16th congress in Luxembourg voted to transform it into the World Confederation of Labour (WCL). Breaking with the federation's strictly Christian ideology of the past, the newly adopted Declaration of Principles stated it would henceforth be guided by "either a spiritual concept based on the conviction that man and universe are created by God, or other concepts that lead together with it to a common effort to build a human community united in freedom, dignity, justice and brotherhood."

=== Globalization and ITUC merger ===
As globalization became more of a threat to union membership throughout the 1980s and 1990s, the WCL increased its efforts to carry out a similar global unification of labour leadership. Its 1993 congress in Mauritius attempted to lay out a concrete strategy for responding to business attacks on organized labour around the world. The WCL soon obtained consultative status within the International Labour Organization and joined the International Council of the World Social Forum.

The WCL was formally dissolved on 31 October 2006 when it merged with the International Confederation of Free Trade Unions (ICFTU) to form the International Trade Union Confederation (ITUC).

== Areas of activity ==
The WCL had nine areas of labour activity where it focused work.

=== Human rights and international labour standards ===
The WCL worked to enforce respect for international law, especially as codified by the ILO. The organization also sought to introduce labour standards into international trade policies.

=== Women workers ===
The World Women's Committee of the WCL convened "representatives from the continents" annually to advocate for women workers and address problems specific to female labourers.

=== Child labour ===
The WCL worked in support of the Global March Against Child Labour and advocated for ILO Convention 182, which addressed serious forms of child labour. The organization also assisted with the First World Congress of Child Workers.

=== Migrant workers ===
The rights of migrants — as humans and as workers — was a particular focus of the WCL's work, especially given its increased presence in a globalized economy.

=== Economics and society ===
Pursuant to the rise of globalization and interest in taking a larger view of macroeconomic policy, the WCL set up a socio-economic programme to address issues of such a scope. In addition to advocacy around matters at the World Trade Organization, the federation sought to reform the World Bank and International Monetary Fund.

=== Informal economy ===
Workers in a society's informal economy — 60 to 90% of the active work population of Africa, according to the ILO — function outside of regulatory and government oversight. The WCL worked to help train local advocates and provide relief to workers in need, including a recycling program for informal economy workers in Brazil.

=== Training ===
The WCL worked to provide capacity building among its various member organizations, training local unionists in areas of recruitment, dues systems, and communications.

=== Trade action ===
The information clearinghouse of the WCL, Trade Action served to promote training; facilitate exchange of knowledge and advice; and support members' participation at meetings of international institutions. It also produced a newsletter, The World of Trade Action.

=== International solidarity foundation ===
The WCL created the International Solidarity Foundation (ISF) to promote cross-country worker unity and provide emergency assistance (from a Solidarity Fund, established in 1958) to organizations in need. After the 2004 Indian Ocean earthquake, the ISF launched a solidarity campaign to assist workers and organizers in the region. The foundation worked in partnership with a variety of other groups, including the Confederation of Christian Trade Unions, the Christelijk Nationaal Vakverbond, and the National Trade Union Confederation (Romania).

== Affiliated secretariats ==
The federation had numerous affiliated trade secretariats, which changed over time. They were smaller than those affiliated to the International Confederation of Free Trade Unions (ICFTU), and some unions affiliated to the WCL chose instead to affiliate to an ICFTU secretariat.

Secretariat in 1932	Secretariat in 1979	Affiliated membership in 1979
International Federation of Christian Agricultural Workers' Unions	World Federation of Agricultural Workers	3,397,000
International Federation of Christian Employees' Trade Unions	World Federation of Trade Unions of Non-Manual Workers	400,000
International Federation of Christian Factory and Transport Workers' Trade Unions	World Organisation for Energy, Chemical and Miscellaneous Industries	150,000
International Federation of Christian Trade Unions of Workers in the Food and Drink Trades	World Federation of Workers in Food, Drink, Tobacco and Hotel Industries	250,000
International Federation of Christian Tobacco Workers	World Federation of Workers in Food, Drink, Tobacco and Hotel Industries	250,000
International Federation of Christian Workers in the Graphical Trades	International Christian Federation of Trade Unions in the Graphic and Paper Industries	36,000
International Federation of Christian Landworkers' Trade Unions	N/A	N/A
International Federation of Christian Leather Workers' Trade Unions	N/A	N/A
International Federation of Christian Trade Unions of Metal Workers	World Federation for the Metallurgic Industry	500,000
International Christian Miners' Federation	International Federation of Christian Miners' Unions	220,000
International Federation of Christian Trade Unions of Post, Telegraph and Telephone Workers	International Federation of Employees in Public Service	3,500,000
International Federation of Christian Trade Unions of Railway and Tramway Men	International Federation of Trade Unions of Transport Workers	600,000
International Federation of Christian Trade Unions in the Clothing and Allied Trades	International Federation of Textile and Clothing Workers' Unions	400,000
International Federation of Christian Trade Unions of Textile Workers	International Federation of Textile and Clothing Workers' Unions	400,000
International Federation of Christian Workers in the Building Trades	World Federation of Building and Woodworkers Unions	330,000
International Federation of Christian Woodworkers	World Federation of Building and Woodworkers Unions	330,000
Founded 1963	World Confederation of Teachers	1,000,000

== Leadership ==
=== General Secretaries ===
1920: Jos Serrarens
1952: August Vanistendael
1968: Jean Brück
1976: Jan Kułakowski
1989: Carlos Custer
1996: Willy Thys

=== Presidents ===
1920: Josef Scherrer
1928: Bernhard Otte
1933: Henri Pauwels and Jules Zirnheld
1937: Jules Zirnheld
1946: Gaston Tessier
1961: Maurice Bouladoux
1973: Marcel Pepin
1981: Johnny Tan
1989: Willy Peirens
1997: Fernand Kikongi
2001: Basile Mahan Gahé

== See also ==
- List of federations of trade unions
