= French Confederation of Christian Workers =

Trade union of France

CFTC
- French Confederation of Christian Workers
- Confédération Française des Travailleurs Chrétiens
- Founded: 1919 (1st foundation); 1964 (2nd foundation)
- Headquarters: Paris, France
- Location: France
- Members: 160,000
- Key people: Philippe Louis, president; Bernard Sagez, secretary general
- Affiliations: ITUC; ETUC
- Website: www.cftc.fr

The French Confederation of Christian Workers (French: Confédération française des travailleurs chrétiens; CFTC) is one of the five major French confederations of trade unions, belonging to the social Christian tradition.

It was founded in 1919 as the Trade Union of Employees of Industry and Commerce under the inspiration of Exupérien Mas with the goal of safeguarding the material as well as the spiritual interests of its members. In 1964, the union split, a majority founding the French Democratic Confederation of Labour (CFDT), a non-confessional trade-union.

The CFTC is a member of the International Trade Union Confederation and the European Trade Union Confederation. Its leader is Jacques Voisin.

== Professional elections ==
The CFTC won 8.69% of the vote in the employee's college during the 2008 professional elections. This result, however, is below the CFTC's 9.65% result in 2002, its best showing to date. In 2021 the CFTC won 11% of the vote.

== Affiliates ==
The following federations are affiliated:

- State agents
- Agriculture
- Banks
- Bâti-Mat TP
- CMTE (chemistry, mining, textile, energy)
- National Federation of Agents of Local Authorities - CFTC
- CSFV (trade, services and sales force)
- Graphic, written and audiovisual communication
- FESEP (Federation of Private Education Unions)
- CFTC Education
- CFTC Metallurgy Federation
- CFTC Pôle Emploi Federation
- Post and telecommunications
- PSE Federation (Social Protection and Employment)
- Fédération CFTC Santé-sociales
- General Federation of Transport CFTC

== Leadership ==
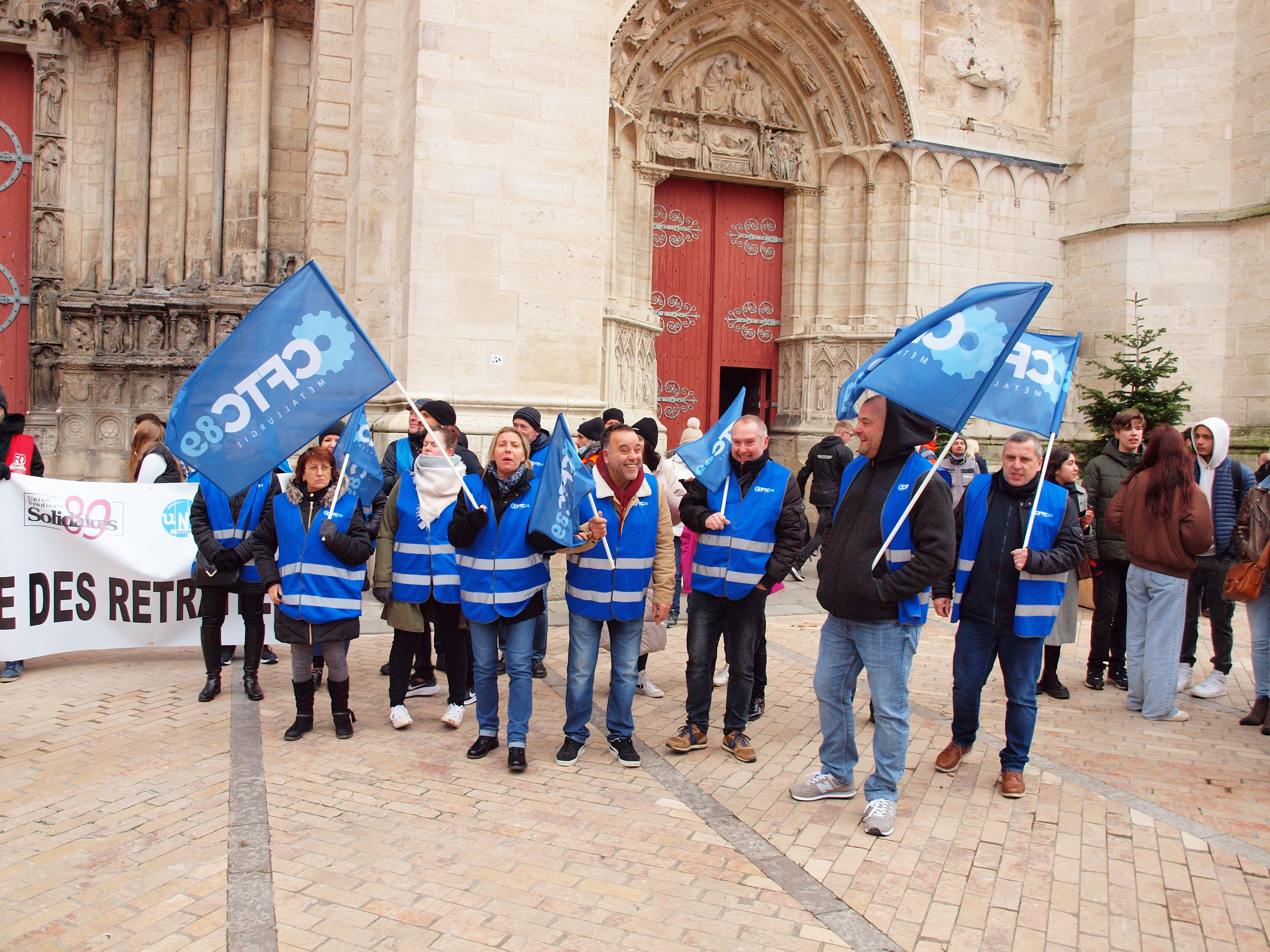
Sens, 2023 French protests.

=== General Secretaries ===
1919: Gaston Tessier
1948: Maurice Bouladoux
1953: Georges Levard
1961: Eugène Descamps
1964: Jacques Tessier
1970: Jean Bornard
1981: Guy Drilleaud
1990: Alain Deleu
1993: Jacques Voisin
2002: Jacky Dintinger
2008: Philippe Louis
2011: Pascale Coton
2015: Bernard Sagez
2019: Eric Heitz

=== Presidents ===
1919: Jules Zirnheld
1946: Georges Torcq
1948: Gaston Tessier
1953: Maurice Bouladoux
1961: Georges Levard
1964: Joseph Sauty
1970: Jacques Tessier
1981: Jean Bornard
1990: Guy Drilleaud
1993: Alain Deleu
2002: Jacques Voisin
2011: Philippe Louis
2020: Cyril Chabanier

== See also ==
- French Confederation of Management – General Confederation of Executives
- French Democratic Confederation of Labour
- General Confederation of Labour (France)
- Mouvement des Entreprises de France
- Politics of France
- Solidaires Unitaires Démocratiques
- Workers' Force
- Simone Saint-Dénis
