= International Federation of Employees in Public Service =

International trade federation

INFEDOP
- International Federation of Employees in Public Service
- Fédération Internationale du Personnel des Services Publics
- Founded: November 1953
- Headquarters: rue Joseph II, Brussels, Belgium
- Location: International
- Members: 3,500,000 (1979)
- Key people: Fritz Neugebauer, president Bert Van Caelenberg, secretary general
- Affiliations: World Confederation of Labour
- Website: www.infedop-eurofedop.com

The International Federation of Employees in Public Service (French: Fédération Internationale du Personnel des Services Publics, INFEDOP) was an International Trade Federation of the World Confederation of Labour (WCL).

== History ==
The federation was founded in November 1953, when the International Federation of Christian Post, Telegraph and Telephone Workers merged with the International Federation of Christian Trade Unions, at a meeting in Paris. Initially named the International Federation of Christian Staff Unions, Utilities and Post, Telegraph and Telephone Workers, it adopted its final name in 1966.

In 1963, the federation founded a section for teachers' unions, which in 1974 split away as the independent World Confederation of Teachers.

By 1979, INFEDOP claimed that its affiliates had a total of 3,500,000 members.

== Affiliates ==
The following unions were affiliated in 1979:

Union	Country
Asociación Argentina de Telegrafistas, Radiotelegrafistas y Afines	Argentina
Algemene Nederlands Antilliaanse Ambtenarenbond Gouvernements Arbeiders Bond Aruba	Netherlands Antilles
Arubaanse Bond van Werknemers in Verplegende Instellingen	Netherlands Antilles
Bond di Trahadornan di Gobierno	Netherlands Antilles
Nederlands Antilliaanse Politiebond	Netherlands Antilles
Sindicato di Trahadornan di Goblerno Bonaire	Netherlands Antilles
Christian Fraction of the Union of Public Services	Austria
Christian Fraction of the Union of Municipal Employees	Austria
Christian Fraction of the Union of Postal and Telecommunications Workers	Austria
Christian Union of Communication and Culture	Belgium
Christian Union of Public Services	Belgium
Uniao Brasileira dos Servidores Postais e Telegraficos	Brazil
Unido Nacional dos Servidores Publicos Civis do Brasil	Brazil
Fédéracion des Affaires Sociales	Canada
Fédéracion des Personnels de Radio et Télévision	Canada
Syndicat des Fonctionnaires Provinciaux de Québec	Canada
Fédération des Employés de Service Publics	Canada
Asociación Nacional de Funcionarios del Trabago de Chile	Chile
Asociación Postal Telegrafica de Chile	Chile
Unión de Obreros Municipales de Chile	Chile
Asociación Nacional del personal de Vialidad de Chile	Chile
Agrupación Nacional de Trabajadores del Ministerio de Obras Publicas	Chile
Federación Colombiana de Trabajadores Estatales	Colombia
Asociación Nacional de Tecnicos en Telefornia y Comunicaciones Afines	Colombia
Federación Unitaria de Trabajadores de la Salud	Costa Rica
Sindicato de Empleados de la Universidad de Costa Rica	Costa Rica
Unión Nacional de Empleados Municipales	Costa Rica
Asociación de Empleados del Seguro Social de Costa Rica	Costa Rica
Asociación Sindical de Trabajadores de Acudeuctos y Alcantarillados	Costa Rica
Federación Nacional de Trabajadores de Obras Publicas	Dominican Republic
Federación Nacional de Trabajadores de la Empresa Nacional de Telecommunicaciones	Ecuador
Federación Ecuadtoriana de Trabajadores Municipales y Provinciales	Ecuador
Asociación Nacional de Trabajadores del Ministerio de Agricultura y Ganaderia	El Salvador
Asociación Sindical Salvadorena de Trabajadores del Turismo	El Salvador
Asociación General de Empleados Publicos y Municipales de El Salvador	El Salvador
Federation of Unions of Post and Telecommunications	France
United National Union of Customs	France
French Federation of Police Unions	France
Interco Federation	France
Union of Public Services	West Germany
Finance Administration Union	West Germany
Christian Union of the Postal Service and Telecommunications	West Germany
Christian Democratic Postal Union	West Germany
Asociación Guatemalteca de Auxiliares de Entermeria	Guatemala
Asociación Guatemalteca de Empleados de Salud Publica	Guatemala
Asociación Nacional de Enfermeras Auxiliares Hondurenas	Honduras
Sindicato de Tabajadores del Instituto Nacional Agrario	Honduras
Federación Nacional de Trabajadores de la Salud de Jonduras en Formación	Honduras
Sindicato de Empleados y Trabajadores de la Region Sanitaria	Honduras
Sindicato de Trabajadores del Servicio Nacional de Erradicacion de la Malaria	Honduras
Civil and Public Service Staff Association	Ireland
Local Government and Public Services Union	Ireland
Institute of Professional Civil Servants	Ireland
ESB Officers' Association	Ireland
Federation of Christian Public Service Workers	Luxembourg
Fédération Nationale de la Fonction Publique de Madagascar	Madagascar
Negeri Sembilan Government Workers' Union	Malaysia
Malta Government Employees' Union	Malta
Federation of Civil Servants' Unions	Mauritius
Bloque Revolucionario de Trabajadores al Servicio del Estato	Mexico
Catholic Union of Government Personnel	Netherlands
Catholic Union of Police	Netherlands
Dutch Christian Union of Government Workers	Netherlands
General Christian Police Union	Netherlands
General Roman Catholic Civil Servants' Association	Netherlands
Federacion de Trabajadores de la Salud	Nicaragua
Federation of Public Service Employees' Unions of Nigeria	Nigeria
Pakistan Fishing Workers' Union	Pakistan
Union de Trabajadores de la Corporacion Panameña de Radiodifusion	Panama
Federación Unica de Trabajadores Telepostales	Peru
Federación Nacional de Trabajadores Municipales	Peru
Sierra Leone Union of Civil Servants	Sierra Leone
Electricity Corporation Employees' Union of Sierra Leone	Sierra Leone
Sri Lanka Co-operative Employees' Organisation	Sri Lanka
Sri Lanka State Engineering Corporation Employees' Independent Union	Sri Lanka
Swiss Union of Christian Postal, Telephone and Telegraph Personnel	Switzerland
Union of Christian State and Municipal Personnel of Switzerland	Switzerland
Trabajadores Estatales de ASU	Uruguay
Federacion de Trabajadores Asistenciales de Venezuela	Venezuela
Federacion Nacional de Trabajadores Agropecuarious recursos Naturales Renovables, Jardineros y Similares	Venezuela
Federacion de Telegrafistas Venezolanos	Venezuela
Federacion Nacional Autonoma de Trabajadores de la Electronica y las Comunicaiones Similares y Conexos de Venezuela	Venezuela
Asociacion de Profesionales de las Telecomunicaciones Aeronauticas de Venezuela	Venezuela
Asociacion Nacional de Tecnicos en Radiocomunicaciones Aeronauticas	Venezuela
Asociacion de Tecnicos de Telecomunicaciones	Venezuela
International and European Officials' Association	International

== Leadership ==
=== General Secretaries ===
Jacques Tessier
Jos Vandecruys
1980 : Jos De Ceulaer
1991: Bert Van Caelenberg

=== Presidents ===
Paul Seiler
Wabe Wieringa
Filip Wieers
Fritz Neugebauer
