= Union of Agriculture, Food and Allied Industries =

Defunct Austrian trade union

The Union of Agriculture, Food and Allied Industries (German: Gewerkschaft Agrar-Nahrung-Genuß, ANG) was a trade union representing workers in agriculture, food processing and other related industries, in Austria.

The union was founded in 1991, when the Union of Agricultural and Forestry Workers merged with the Union of Workers in Food and Allied Industries. Like its predecessors, it affiliated to the Austrian Trade Union Federation. By 1998, it had 44,432 members.

In 2002, the union began sharing offices in Vienna with the Metal-Textile Union, and on 10 May 2006, the two unions merged, forming the Metal-Textile-Food Union. The Metal-Textile-Food Union has since merged with the Chemical Workers' Union to form PRO-GE.

== Presidents ==
1991: Leopold Simperl
2004: Rainer Wimmer
