= Markus Vogl =

Austrian politician (born 1970)

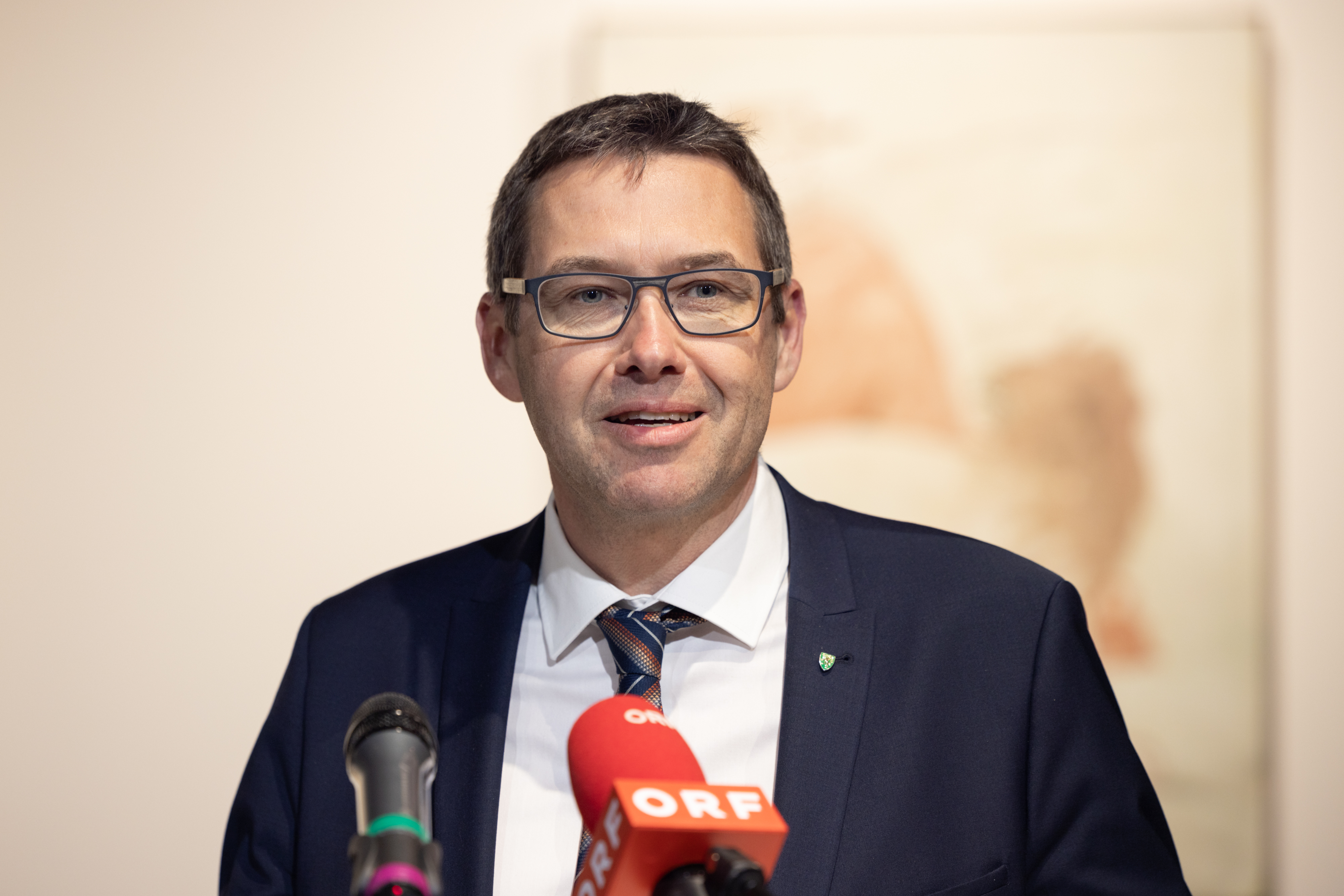
- Vogl in April 2023

Member of the National Council
- In office 29 October 2013 – 6 January 2021
- Succeeded by: Elisabeth Feichtinger
- Constituency: Traunviertel

Personal details
- Born: 27 November 1970 (age 55) Steyr, Austria
- Party: Social Democratic Party

Markus Vogl (born 27 November 1970) is an Austrian politician and former member of the National Council. A member of the Social Democratic Party, he represented Traunviertel from October 2013 to January 2021.

Vogl was born on 27 November 1970 in Steyr. His early education was at boarding school as his mother was a single parent and a shift worker at Steyr plants. He worked for MAN Truck & Bus from 1991 to 2010 designing driver's cabs. He joined the works council at MAN in 2000 and served as its chairman from 2010 to 2019. He has been a member of the presidium of the Union of Private Sector Employees, Printing, Journalism, and Paper (GPA-DJP) since 2014 and chairman of the union's Upper Austrian branch since 2015. He has been a member of the board of the Austrian Trade Union Federation (ÖGB) since 2015. He has held various positions in the Gleink and Steyr branches of the Social Democratic Party (SPÖ) since 2009 and is a member of the party's federal executive. He was elected to the National Council at the 2013 legislative election. He resigned in January 2021 to become deputy mayor of Steyr and was replaced by Elisabeth Feichtinger in the National Council. He became mayor of Steyr in November 2021.

Electoral history of Markus Vogl
Election	Electoral district	Party	Votes	%	Result
2006 legislative	Traunviertel	Social Democratic Party	194	0.32%	Not elected
2006 legislative	Upper Austria	Social Democratic Party	2	0.00%	Not elected
2008 legislative	Traunviertel	Social Democratic Party	213	0.40%	Not elected
2008 legislative	Upper Austria	Social Democratic Party	4	0.00%	Not elected
2013 legislative	Traunviertel	Social Democratic Party	4,458	9.95%	Elected
2017 legislative	Traunviertel	Social Democratic Party	6,523	13.53%	Elected
2017 legislative	Upper Austria	Social Democratic Party	116	0.05%	Not elected
2017 legislative	Federal List	Social Democratic Party	121	0.01%	Not elected
2019 legislative	Traunviertel	Social Democratic Party	6,816	17.84%	Elected
2019 legislative	Upper Austria	Social Democratic Party	195	0.10%	Not elected
2019 legislative	Federal List	Social Democratic Party	206	0.02%	Not elected
