= Rainer Wimmer =

Austrian politician (1955–2025)

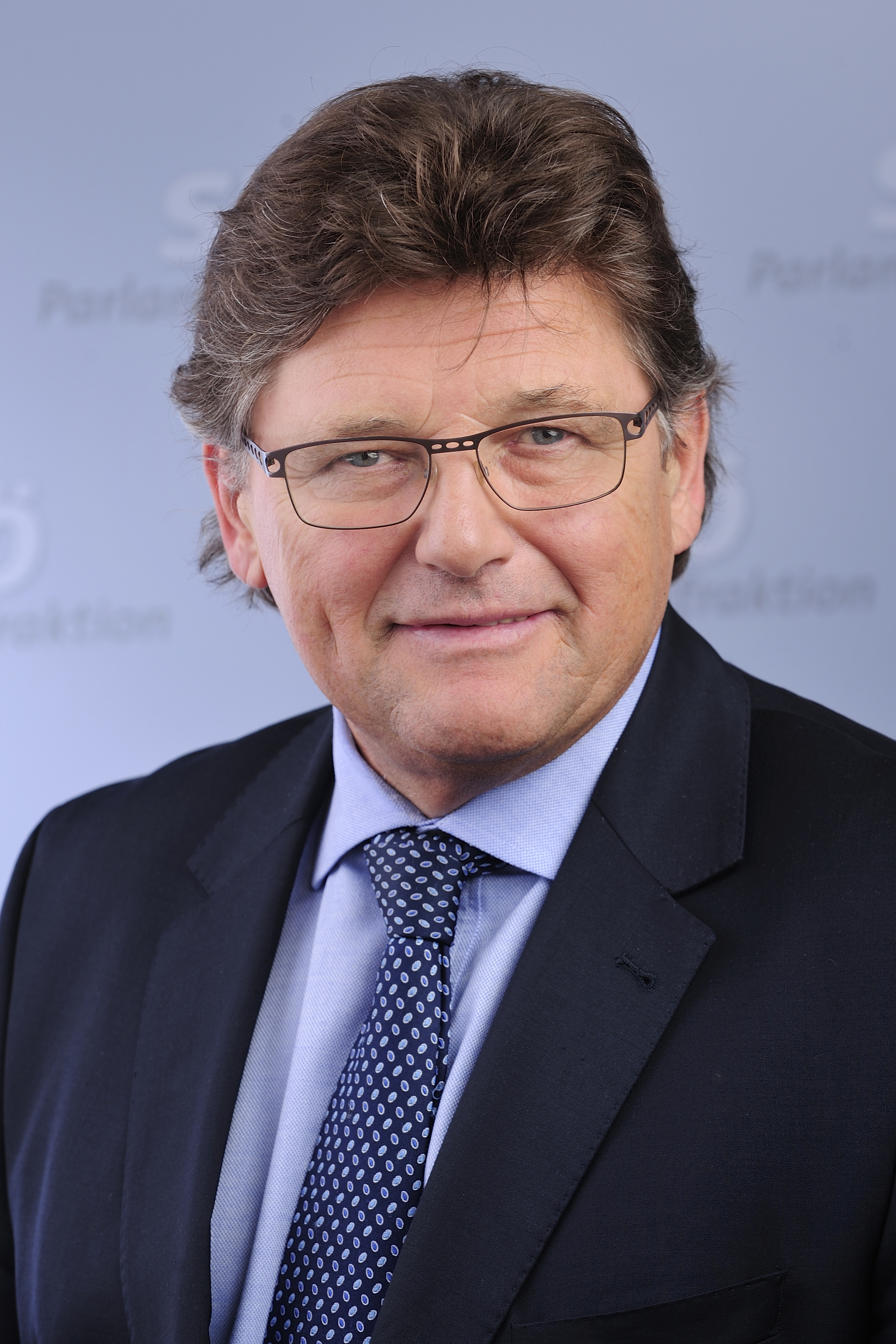
- Wimmer in April 2014

Member of the National Council
- In office 18 October 2018 – 23 October 2024
- Preceded by: Wolfgang Katzian
- Constituency: Federal List
- In office 29 October 2013 – 8 November 2017
- Constituency: Federal List
- In office 7 November 1994 – 27 October 2008
- Constituency: Traunviertel
- In office 1 December 1993 – 6 November 1994
- Preceded by: Karl Neuwirth
- Constituency: Upper Austria

Personal details
- Born: 10 August 1955 Hallstatt, Upper Austria, Austria
- Died: 24 June 2025 (aged 69)
- Party: Social Democratic Party

Rainer Leopold Wimmer (10 August 1955 – 24 June 2025) was an Austrian trade unionist, politician and a member of the National Council. A member of the Social Democratic Party, he represented Upper Austria from December 1993 to November 1994, Traunviertel from November 1994 to October 2008 and the Federal List from October 2013 to November 2017 and from October 2018 to October 2024.

Wimmer was born on 10 August 1955 in Hallstatt. He trained to be an electrician at a vocational school from 1970 to 1974. He worked as an electrician for the salt mining company Salinen Austria from 1970 to 1983. He was chairman of the works council at Salinen Austria in 1983 and chairman of its central works council from 1984 to 2010. He was appointed to the board of the Union of Agriculture, Food and Allied Industries (ANG) in 1984 and served as its chairman from 2004 to 2006. He was deputy federal chairman of the Metal-Textile-Food Union (GMTN) from 2006 to 2008. He was a member of the Federal Executive Board of the Austrian Trade Union Federation (ÖGB) from 2003 to 2023 and a member of its board from 2009 to 2023. He was federal chairman of the PRO-GE trade union from 2009 to 2023 and chairman of Social Democratic Trade Unionists (FSG) in the ÖGB from 2018 to 2023.

Wimmer was a member of the municipal council in Hallstatt from 1985 and served as its mayor from April 1988 to 1993. He was appointed to the National Council in December 1993 following the resignation of Karl Neuwirth. He was not re-elected at the 2008 legislative election but was returned to the National Council at the 2013 legislative election. He was not re-elected at the 2017 legislative election but in October 2018 he was appointed to the National Council following the resignation of Wolfgang Katzian.

Wimmer was married and had three children. On 24 June 2025, Wimmer died at the age of 69.

Electoral history of Rainer Wimmer
Election	Electoral district	Party	Votes	%	Result
1990 legislative	Upper Austria	Social Democratic Party	9	0.00%	Not elected
1990 legislative	Electoral Union West	Social Democratic Party	-	-	Not elected
1994 legislative	Traunviertel	Social Democratic Party	4,576	8.14%	Elected
1994 legislative	Upper Austria	Social Democratic Party	702	0.25%	Not elected
1994 legislative	Federal List	Social Democratic Party	-	-	Not elected
1995 legislative	Traunviertel	Social Democratic Party	4,974	7.86%	Elected
1995 legislative	Upper Austria	Social Democratic Party	422	0.13%	Not elected
1995 legislative	Federal List	Social Democratic Party	-	-	Not elected
1999 legislative	Traunviertel	Social Democratic Party	4,564	8.45%	Elected
1999 legislative	Upper Austria	Social Democratic Party	467	0.17%	Not elected
1999 legislative	Federal List	Social Democratic Party	-	-	Not elected
2002 legislative	Traunviertel	Social Democratic Party	5,556	8.80%	Elected
2002 legislative	Upper Austria	Social Democratic Party	256	0.08%	Not elected
2002 legislative	Federal List	Social Democratic Party	-	-	Not elected
2006 legislative	Traunviertel	Social Democratic Party	4,641	7.77%	Elected
2006 legislative	Upper Austria	Social Democratic Party	240	0.08%	Not elected
2006 legislative	Federal List	Social Democratic Party	-	-	Not elected
2008 legislative	Traunviertel	Social Democratic Party	4,751	9.03%	Not elected
2008 legislative	Upper Austria	Social Democratic Party	848	0.32%	Not elected
2008 legislative	Federal List	Social Democratic Party	-	-	Not elected
2013 legislative	Federal List	Social Democratic Party	211	0.02%	Elected
2017 legislative	Federal List	Social Democratic Party	157	0.01%	Not elected
2019 legislative	Federal List	Social Democratic Party	993	0.10%	Elected
