= Friedrich Hillegeist =

Austrian politician (1895–1973)

Personal details
- Born: 21 February 1895 Vienna, Austria-Hungary
- Died: 3 December 1973 (aged 78) Vienna, Austria
- Party: Social Democratic Party of Austria

Friedrich Hillegeist (21 February 1895 – 3 December 1973) was an Austrian politician.

== Life ==
After attending the Academy of Commerce from 1913 to 1929, Hillegeist worked as a Clerk at Siemens-Schuckert in Vienna. From 1929 he was secretary of the Federation of industry employees in Austria. In 1934 he was a recruiter for small life insurance with the insurance company Phoenix. During the period of National Socialism, he was detained for 14 months, from 1 September 1939 until the end of April 1940, in the Buchenwald concentration camp.

After World War II, Hillegeist committed again to the union movement: he became Chairman of employees Insurance Institution in 1948, President of the International Federation of Commercial in 1955, and Vice-President of the Austrian Trade Union Federation and President of the Federation of Austrian Social Insurance Institutions in 1959. From 1962, he was Honorary Chairman of the Austrian Trade Union Federation.

From 1945 to 1962 he was Member of Parliament and from 1961 to 1962, Second President of the National Council.

In the second District of Vienna, the street in which the main of the pension insurance institution is located is named after him.

== Awards ==
- 1956: Decoration of Honour for Services to the Republic of Austria
- 1957: Grand Silver Medal with Ribbon for Services to the Republic of Austria

Trade union offices
Preceded by New position	President of the Union of Private Sector Employees; 1945–1962	Succeeded by Rudolf Häuser
Preceded by James Young	President of the International Federation of Commercial, Clerical and Technical Employees; 1955–1960	Succeeded by Algot Jonsson
