= CMTU =

CMTU may refer to:

- Confederation of Malta Trade Unions
- Confederation of Mongolian Trade Unions
