= Stefanie Mayer =

Austrian singer

Stefanie Elisabeth Konstanze Maria Mayer (born 1995) is an Austrian singer, songwriter and musical performer.

== Life ==
Born in Vienna, Mayer grew up in Breitenfurt bei Wien. At the age of 12 she received lessons in classical singing, ballet and jazz dance. Later she became the front singer of the band Dish Of Citizen Drake. She began her professional training in Vienna in 2012, which she completed in 2018 with the Paritätische Bühnen-Reifeprüfung in Musical (younion).

Since 2016, Mayer has been a member of the youth choir of the Volksoper Wien and has had performances in, among others, Hänsel und Gretel, Das Wunder der Heliane, Prince Igor, A Midsummer Night's Dream (ballet), Carousel, My Sister and I and Brigadoon. She took her first solo role in 2016 as Clara/Chiara in the BaRock opera Vivaldi - The Fifth Season by Christian Kolonovits.

In 2019, she won first place in the casting show Stimmhelden in Carinthia with the song I Dreamed A Dream from the musical Les Misérables. In 2020, she participated in the Voice of Carinthia competition and achieved first place with the song I'd Rather Go Blind by Etta James. In 2021, she participated in the ORF talent show Starmania 21 and made it to the first final show, where she sang Nothing Compares by Sinéad O'Connor and was subsequently eliminated.

Her third single Remember was released in January 2021.

== Roles ==
- 2016 – Vivaldi – Die fünfte Jahreszeit – Volksoper Wien (Clara)
- 2019 – Le roi Carotte – Volksoper Wien (Lépida)
- 2021 – The Land of Smiles – Volksoper Wien (Fini)
