= Fritz Verzetnitsch =

Austrian trade unionist (1945–2024)

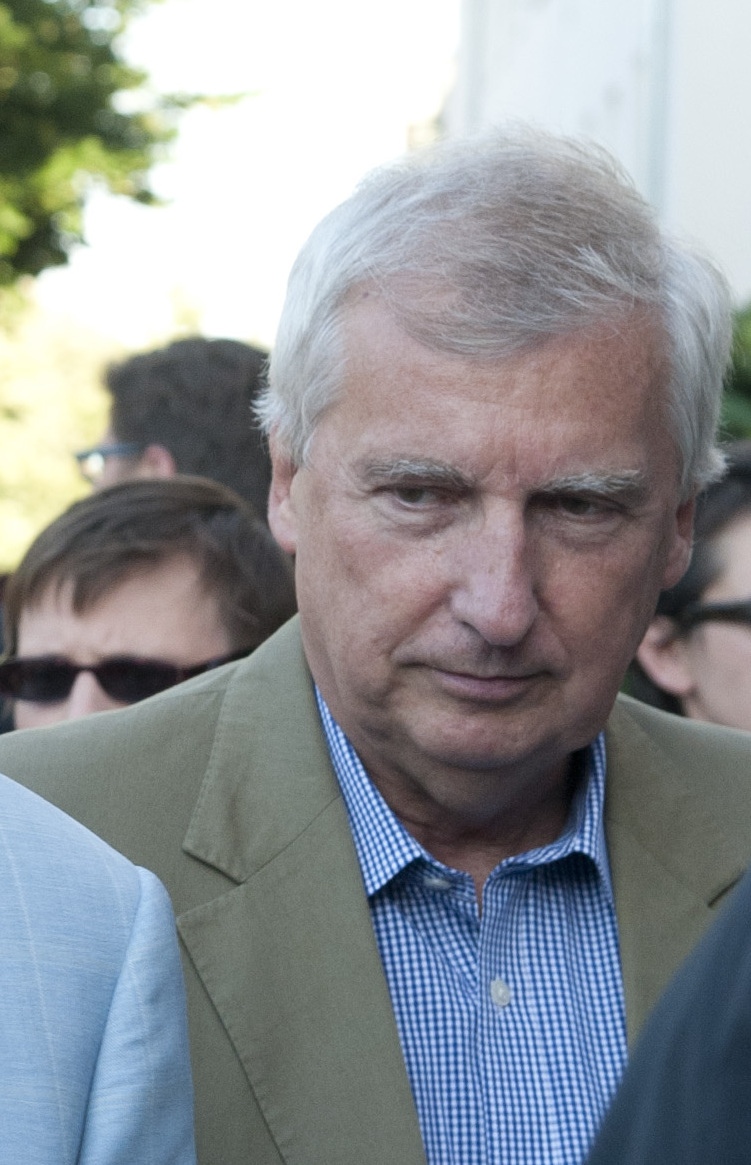
- Verzetnitsch in 2011

President of the Austrian Trade Union Federation
- In office 1987–2006
- Preceded by: Anton Benya
- Succeeded by: Rudolf Hundstorfer

President of the European Trade Union Confederation
- In office 1993–2003
- Preceded by: Norman Willis
- Succeeded by: Cándido Méndez Rodríguez

Personal details
- Born: 22 May 1945; Vienna, Allied-occupied Austria
- Died: 18 July 2024 (aged 79)
- Political party: Social Democratic Party of Austria

Friedrich Verzetnitsch (22 May 1945 – 18 July 2024) was an Austrian trade unionist.

== Biography ==
Born in Vienna, Verzetnitsch completed an apprenticeship as a pipe fitter and began working for a small business. In 1961, he joined the Union of Metal, Mining and Energy. He became active in the Austrian Trade Union Federation's (ÖGB) youth organisation, and from 1963 was the president of its Vienna region. In 1970, he began working full-time for the ÖGB, and in 1983 he was appointed general secretary of its executive.

In 1986, Verzetnitsch was elected as a Social Democratic Party of Austria member of the National Council. In 1987, he was elected as president of the ÖGB. From 1993 until 2003, he also served as president of the European Trade Union Confederation.

In 2000, Verzetnitsch secretly used the ÖGB's strike fund to guarantee the debts of the BAWAG bank, which the ÖGB owned. This became public knowledge in 2006, and the resulting scandal led Verzetnitsch to resign all his positions.

Verzetnitsch died on 18 July 2024, at the age of 79.

Trade union offices
Preceded by Anton Benya	President of the Austrian Trade Union Federation; 1987–2006	Succeeded by Rudolf Hundstorfer
Preceded by Norman Willis	President of the European Trade Union Confederation; 1993–2003	Succeeded by Cándido Méndez Rodríguez
