= Wolfgang Katzian =

Austrian politician (born 1956)

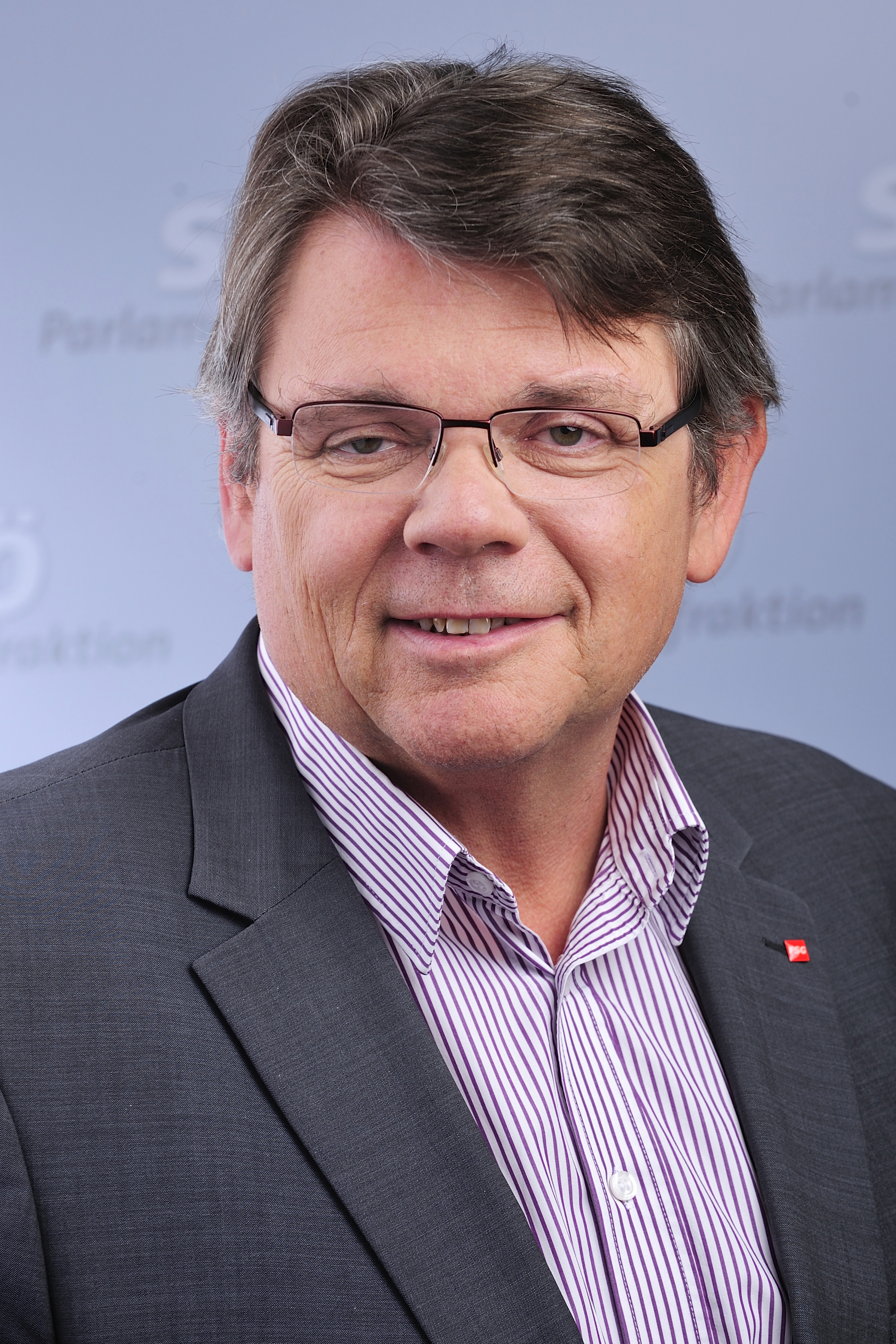
- Wolfgang Katzian in 2014

Chairman of the European Trade Union Confederation
- Incumbent
- Assumed office 26 May 2023
- Preceded by: Laurent Berger

President of the Austrian Trade Union Federation
- Incumbent
- Assumed office 14 June 2018
- Preceded by: Erich Foglar

Personal details
- Born: 28 October 1956 (age 69) Stockerau, Austria

Wolfgang Katzian (born October 28, 1956, in Stockerau, Austria) is an Austrian politician and president of the Austrian Trade Union Federation (ÖGB) since June 14, 2018, and president of European Trade Union Confederation (ETUC) since May 26, 2023.

== Career ==
After finishing primary and secondary school, Katzian initially enrolled in a commercial academy for a year. Following that, he embarked on an apprenticeship as a banker from 1971 to 1974, and subsequently worked in the foreign exchange department of the Länderbank from 1970 to 1977. His roles evolved over the years: starting as a youth secretary in 1977, then advancing to secretary to the management in 1986, central secretary for education, advertising, and member services in 1992, and finally central secretary for organization at the Union of Private Sector Employees (GPA) in 1994. By 2000, he ascended to the position of federal managing director of the GPA. Additionally, in 1990, he assumed the role of deputy secretary, and by 1998, he was appointed as secretary of the Social Democratic Trade Union Group (FSG).

Protest against 12-hour workday, 2018

In 2005, he became chairman of the Union of Private Sector Employees (GPA), which at the time was Austria's largest trade union. In 2007, the GPA merged with the Union of Private Sector Employees, Printing, Journalism, and Paper (DJP), Austria's oldest trade union, to form the GPA-DJP. Katzian retained his position as Chairman in the new union, which, as of June 2010, remains the largest in Austria. Intermittently since 2006 he has served as member of Austria's National Council for the Social Democratic Party of Austria (SPÖ). He has been a member of the UNI World Executive board since 2005.

At the ÖGB federal congress in 2009 he was elected chairman of the FSG, and Rainer Wimmer succeeded him in this role in June 2018. On June 14, 2018, he was elected President of the Austrian Trade Union Federation (ÖGB) as the successor to Erich Foglar.

Katzian was also part-time president of the football club FK Austria Wien from 2007 until November 5, 2018. On May 26, 2023, he succeeded Laurent Berger as President of the European Trade Union Confederation (ETUC).

Trade union offices
Preceded by Hans Sallmutter	President of the Union of Private Sector Employees; 2005–2007	Succeeded by Union merged
Preceded by New position	President of the Union of Private Sector Employees, Printing, Journalism, and Paper; 2007–2018	Succeeded by Barbara Teiber
Preceded by Erich Foglar	President of the Austrian Trade Union Federation; 2018–present	Succeeded by Incumbent
Preceded by Laurent Berger	President of the European Trade Union Confederation; 2023–present	Succeeded by Incumbent
