= Bernhard Höfler =

Austrian politician (born 1986)

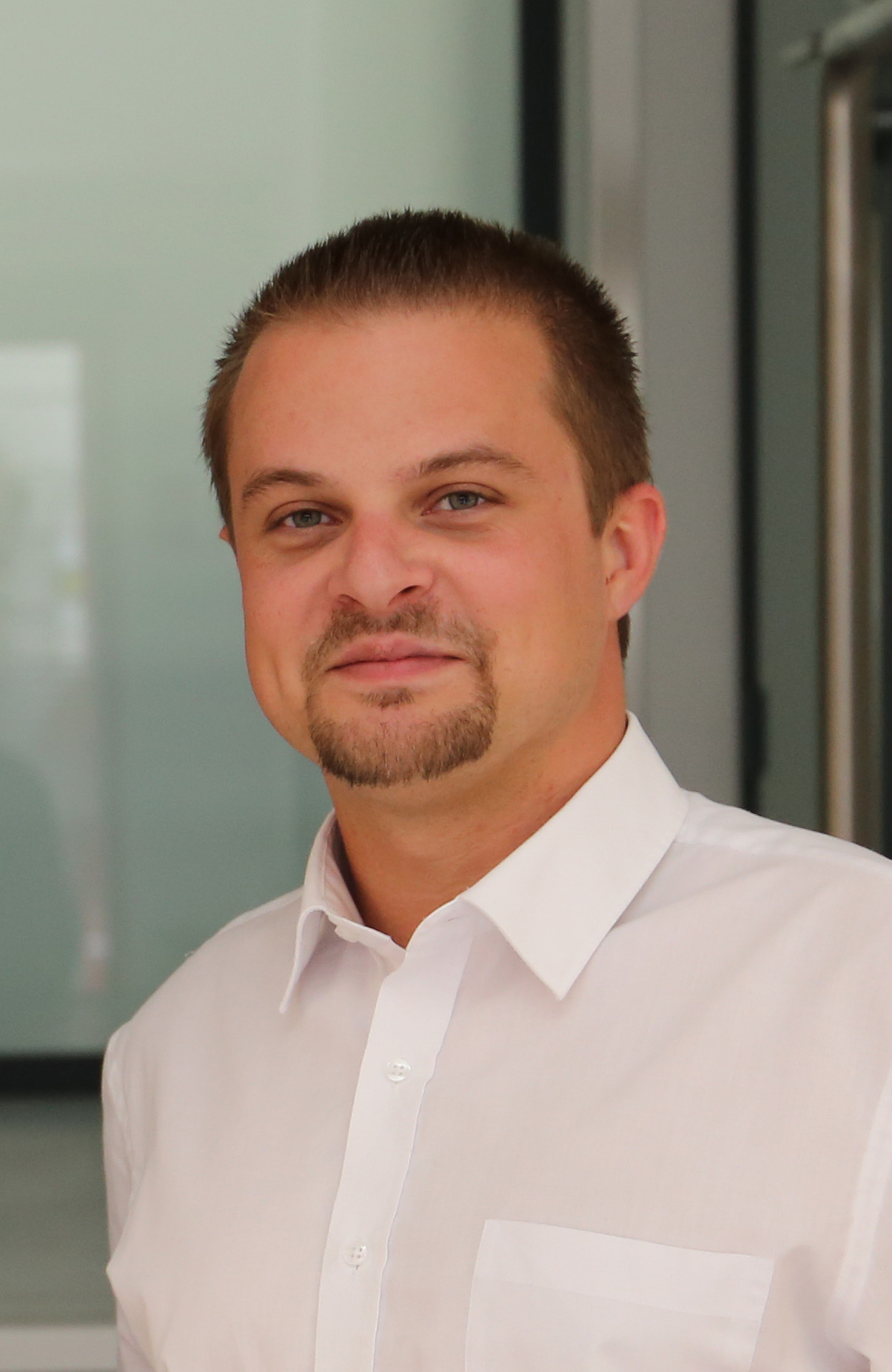

Member of the National Council
- Incumbent
- Assumed office 24 October 2024
- Constituency: Tyrol

Personal details
- Born: 1986 (age 39–40) Innsbruck, Austria
- Party: Social Democratic Party
- Website: bernhardhoefler.at

Bernhard Höfler (born 1986) is an Austrian politician and member of the National Council. A member of the Social Democratic Party, he has represented Tyrol since October 2024.

Höfler was born in 1986 in Innsbruck. He studied at the Villa Blanka Tourism School in Innsbruck. He was a Chef de Rang at the Restaurant Glasmalerei in Innsbruck from 2006 to 2007. He has worked for the Austrian Trade Union Federation (ÖGB) since 2007. He has been chairman of the Social Democratic Trade Unionists' Group (FSG) in Tyrol since May 2022. He was elected to the National Council at the 2024 legislative election.

Höfler has a son.

Electoral history of Bernhard Höfler
Election	Electoral district	Party	Votes	%	Result
2017 legislative	Innsbruck Rural	Social Democratic Party	1,125	3.63%	Not elected
2017 legislative	Tyrol	Social Democratic Party	348	0.41%	Not elected
2017 legislative	Federal List	Social Democratic Party	240	0.02%	Not elected
2019 legislative	Innsbruck Rural	Social Democratic Party	2,047	10.85%	Not elected
2019 legislative	Tyrol	Social Democratic Party	405	0.80%	Not elected
2019 legislative	Federal List	Social Democratic Party	299	0.03%	Not elected
2024 legislative	Innsbruck Rural	Social Democratic Party	2,542	10.96%	Not elected
2024 legislative	Tyrol	Social Democratic Party	710	1.16%	Elected
2024 legislative	Federal List	Social Democratic Party	440	0.04%	Not elected
