= GLB =

GLB may refer to:

- Gay, lesbian and bisexual
- Girls' Life Brigade, a constituent organization of the Girls' Brigade
- Gramm–Leach–Bliley Act of the United States Congress
- Grant Lee Buffalo, an American rock band
- Greatest lower bound
- Great Leap Brewing, a Chinese brewery
- Mercedes-Benz GLB, a sport utility vehicle
- San Carlos Apache Airport, in Arizona, United States
- GLB file format (.glb), the binary form of glTF
- Union of Workers in Food and Allied Industries, a former Austrian trade union
- Gothic & Lolita Bible, a Japanese fashion magazine and book
