= DJP =

DJP may refer to

- DJP (album), by Daniel Padilla
- Dalit Janajati Party
- Directorate General of Taxes (Direktorat Jenderal Pajak) in Indonesia
- Democratic Justice Party
- Union of Printing, Journalism, and Paper (Gewerkschaft Druck, Journalismus, Papier) in Austria
- Prim's algorithm, also known as the DJP algorithm
