= Union of Metal, Mining and Energy =

The Union of Metal, Mining and Energy (German: Gewerkschaft Metall-Bergbau-Energie, GMBE) was a trade union representing blue collar workers in Austria.

The union was founded by the Austrian Trade Union Federation in 1945. It was the federation's largest affiliate until 1978, when it was overtaken by the Union of Private Sector Employees. By 1998, it had 205,898 members, with 90% in the metal trades, and most of the remaining 10% working in mining and quarrying. In iron and steel works, it had almost 100% membership.

In 2000, the union merged with the Union of Textile, Clothing and Leather Workers, to form the Metal Textile Union.

== Presidents ==
1945: Karl Maisel
1962: Anton Benya
1977: Karl Sekanina
1985: Josef Wille
1988: Rudolf Nürnberger
