= Höfler =

Höfler is a surname. Notable people with the surname include:

- Bernhard Höfler (born 1986), Austrian politician
- Heinrich Höfler (1897–1963), German politician
- Konstantin von Höfler (1811–1898), German historian
- Nicolas Höfler (born 1990), German footballer
- Otto Höfler (1901–1987), Austrian scholar of German studies

== See also ==
- Hoefler (disambiguation)
