= Personal Service Workers' Union =

The Personal Service Workers' Union (German: Gewerkschaft Persönlicher Dienst, GPA) was a trade union representing service workers in Austria.

The union was founded by the Austrian Trade Union Federation in 1945. By 1977, it had 22,107 members, of whom more than 90% were women. The following year, it merged with the Hotel and Restaurant Workers' Union, to form the Hotel, Catering and Personal Services Union.

== Presidents ==
1945: Friedrich Schubert
c.1960: Adalbert Busta
