= Union of Agricultural and Forestry Workers =

The Union of Agricultural and Forestry Workers (German: Gewerkschaft Land, Forst, Garten, GLFG) was a trade union representing countryside workers in Austria.

The union was founded by the Austrian Trade Union Federation in 1945. By 1990, it had only 18,387 members. The following year, it merged with the Union of Workers in Food and Allied Industries, to form the Union of Agriculture, Food and Allied Industries.

== Presidents ==
1945: Pius Schneeberger
1961: Herbert Pansi
Erich Dirngrabner
