= Hotel, Catering and Personal Services Union =

Austrian trade union

The Hotels, Catering and Personal Services Union (German: Gewerkschaft Hotel, Gastgewerbe, Persönlicher Dienst, HGPD) was a trade union representing workers in the hospitality industry in Austria.

The union was founded in 1978, when the Hotel and Restaurant Workers' Union merged with the Personal Service Workers' Union. Like its forerunners, the union affiliated to the Austrian Trade Union Federation.

By 1998, the union had 50,320 members. In 2006, it merged with the Railway Workers' Union and the Commerce and Transport Union, to form Vida.

== Presidents ==
1978: Florian Mück
1987: Franz Erwin Niemitz
