= Peter Wurm =

Austrian politician (born 1965)

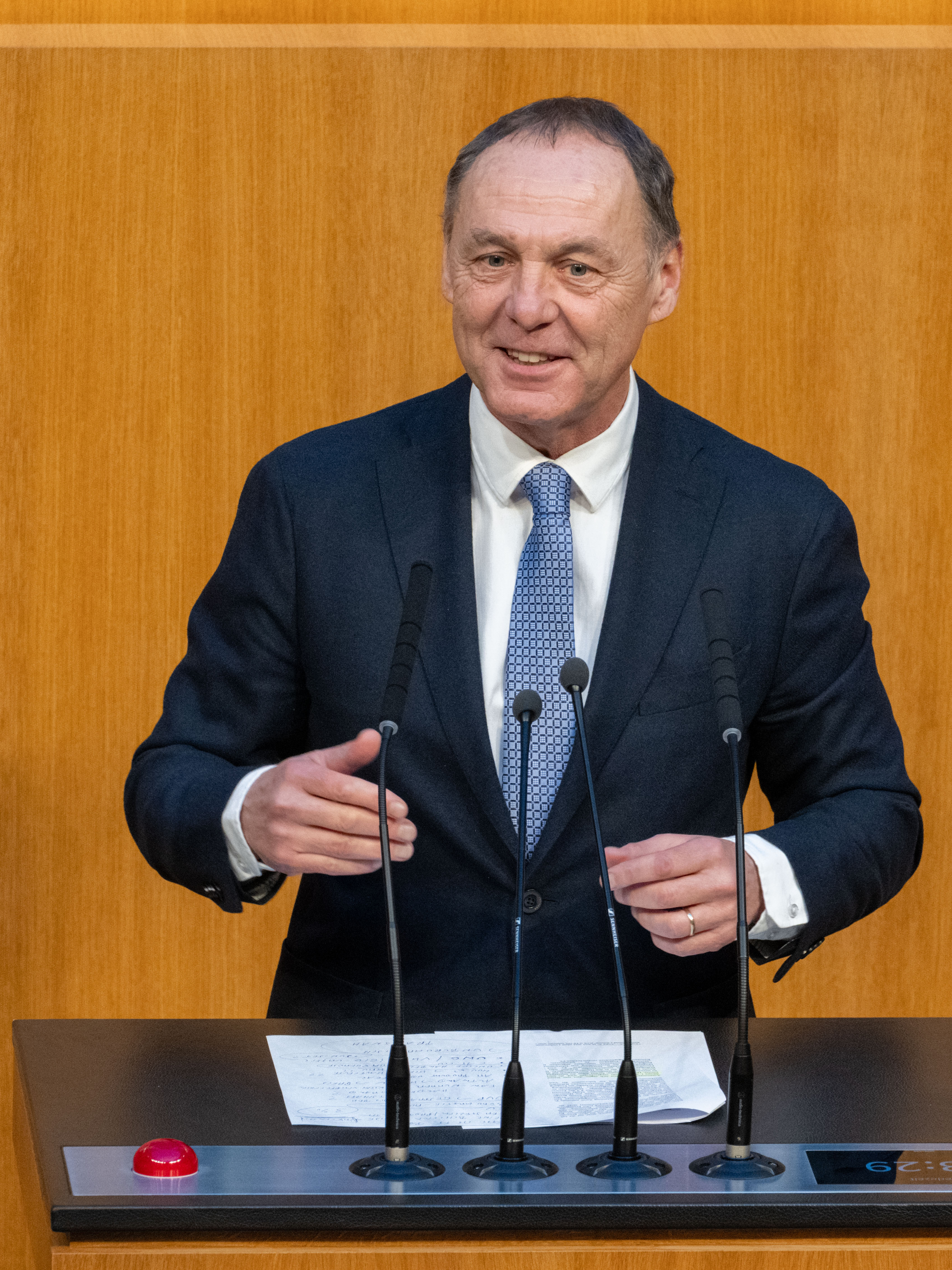
- Peter Wurm in 2026

Member of the National Council
- Incumbent
- Assumed office 29 October 2013
- Constituency: 7B Innsbruck Rural

Personal details
- Born: 23 February 1965 (age 61)
- Party: Freedom Party of Austria

Peter Wurm (born 23 February 1965) is an Austrian politician who has been a Member of the National Council for the Freedom Party of Austria (FPÖ) since 2013.
