= Hotel and Restaurant Workers' Union (Austria) =

Austrian trade union

The Hotel and Restaurant Workers' Union (German: Gewerkschaft Gastgewerblicher Arbeiter, GGA) was a trade union representing hospitality workers in Austria.

The union was founded by the Austrian Trade Union Federation in 1945. By 1977, it had 21,484 members. The following year, it merged with the Personal Service Workers' Union, to form the Hotel, Catering and Personal Services Union.

== Presidents ==
1945: Karl Komenda
1955: Ferdinand Nothelfer
1956: Fritz Sailer
