= Traunviertel (National Council electoral district) =

Parliamentary electoral district in Austria

- Electoral District for the National Council
- Location of Traunviertel within Austria
- District: List: Gmunden; Kirchdorf; Steyr City; Steyr Rural
- State: Upper Austria
- Population: 261,836 (2024)
- Electorate: 197,070 (2019)
- Area: 3,670 km^{2} (2023)

Current Electoral District
- Created: 1994
- Seats: 6 (1994–present)
- Members: List: Elisabeth Feichtinger (SPÖ); Johann Singer (ÖVP); Bettina Zopf (ÖVP)

Traunviertel, also known as Electoral District 4D (German: Wahlkreis 4D), is one of the 39 multi-member regional electoral districts of the National Council, the lower house of the Austrian Parliament, the national legislature of Austria. The electoral district was created in 1992 when electoral regulations were amended to add regional electoral districts to the existing state-wide electoral districts and came into being at the following legislative election in 1994. It consists of the city of Steyr and the districts of Gmunden, Kirchdorf and Steyr Rural in the state of Upper Austria. The electoral district currently elects six of the 183 members of the National Council using the open party-list proportional representation electoral system. At the 2019 legislative election the constituency had 197,070 registered electors.

== History ==
Traunviertel was one 43 regional electoral districts (regionalwahlkreise) established by the "National Council Electoral Regulations 1992" (Nationalrats-Wahlordnung 1992) passed by the National Council in 1992. It consisted of the city of Steyr and the districts of Gmunden, Kirchdorf and Steyr Rural in the state of Upper Austria. The district was initially allocated six seats in May 1993.

== Electoral system ==
Traunviertel currently elects six of the 183 members of the National Council using the open party-list proportional representation electoral system. The allocation of seats is carried out in three stages. In the first stage, seats are allocated to parties (lists) at the regional level using a state-wide Hare quota (wahlzahl) (valid votes in the state divided by the number of seats in the state). In the second stage, seats are allocated to parties at the state/provincial level using the state-wide Hare quota (any seats won by the party at the regional stage are subtracted from the party's state seats). In the third and final stage, seats are allocated to parties at the federal/national level using the D'Hondt method (any seats won by the party at the regional and state stages are subtracted from the party's federal seats). Only parties that reach the 4% national threshold, or have won a seat at the regional stage, compete for seats at the state and federal stages.

Electors may cast one preferential vote for individual candidates at the regional, state and federal levels. Split-ticket voting (panachage), or voting for more than one candidate at each level, is not permitted and will result in the ballot paper being invalidated. At the regional level, candidates must receive preferential votes amounting to at least 14% of the valid votes cast for their party to over-ride the order of the party list (10% and 7% respectively for the state and federal levels). Prior to April 2013 electors could not cast preferential votes at the federal level and the thresholds candidates needed to over-ride the party list order were higher at the regional level (half the Hare quota or 1/6 of the party votes) and state level (Hare quota).

== Election results ==
=== Summary ===
Election	Communists KPÖ+ / KPÖ			Social Democrats SPÖ			Greens GRÜNE			NEOS NEOS / LiF			People's ÖVP			Freedom FPÖ		
Election	Votes	%	Seats	Votes	%	Seats	Votes	%	Seats	Votes	%	Seats	Votes	%	Seats	Votes	%	Seats
2019	856	0.56%	0	38,208	25.19%	1	20,074	13.24%	0	10,620	7.00%	0	53,475	35.26%	2	25,233	16.64%	0
2017	870	0.54%	0	48,205	30.02%	1	5,409	3.37%	0	7,716	4.80%	0	47,753	29.74%	1	42,052	26.19%	1
2013	1,197	0.79%	0	44,797	29.48%	1	18,391	12.10%	0	5,351	3.52%	0	34,894	22.96%	1	30,988	20.39%	1
2008	1,117	0.70%	0	52,620	33.15%	1	15,345	9.67%	0	2,088	1.32%	0	39,792	25.07%	1	26,902	16.95%	0
2006	1,318	0.86%	0	59,723	39.01%	2	15,366	10.04%	0				50,691	33.11%	1	17,373	11.35%	0
2002	758	0.48%	0	63,167	40.14%	2	13,117	8.34%	0	1,290	0.82%	0	63,298	40.22%	2	15,735	10.00%	0
1999	504	0.33%	0	53,984	35.88%	2	10,986	7.30%	0	3,802	2.53%	0	39,531	26.27%	1	39,763	26.43%	1
1995	355	0.23%	0	63,305	40.59%	2	8,073	5.18%	0	6,755	4.33%	0	41,805	26.80%	1	33,429	21.43%	1
1994	309	0.21%	0	56,242	37.64%	2	11,438	7.66%	0	6,840	4.58%	0	38,120	25.51%	1	33,524	22.44%	1

=== Detailed ===
==== 2010s ====
===== 2019 =====
Results of the 2019 legislative election held on 29 September 2019:

Party		Votes per district					Total votes	%	Seats
Party		Gmun- den	Kirch- dorf	Steyr City	Steyr Rural	Voting card	Total votes	%	Seats
Austrian People's Party	ÖVP	20,878	12,971	4,573	14,913	140	53,475	35.26%	2
Social Democratic Party of Austria	SPÖ	15,144	6,748	6,975	9,266	75	38,208	25.19%	1
Freedom Party of Austria	FPÖ	9,327	6,223	3,300	6,321	62	25,233	16.64%	0
The Greens	GRÜNE	8,165	4,160	2,770	4,780	199	20,074	13.24%	0
NEOS – The New Austria and Liberal Forum	NEOS	4,524	2,422	1,101	2,485	88	10,620	7.00%	0
JETZT	JETZT	1,029	435	362	503	22	2,351	1.55%	0
KPÖ Plus	KPÖ+	367	148	155	178	8	856	0.56%	0
Der Wandel	WANDL	288	189	100	184	10	771	0.51%	0
Socialist Left Party	SLP	30	8	9	18	0	65	0.04%	0
Valid Votes		59,752	33,304	19,345	38,648	604	151,653	100.00%	3
Rejected Votes		1,068	504	243	580	4	2,399	1.56%	
Total Polled		60,820	33,808	19,588	39,228	608	154,052	78.17%	
Registered Electors		78,454	43,478	27,006	48,132		197,070		
Turnout		77.52%	77.76%	72.53%	81.50%		78.17%		

The following candidates were elected:

- Personal mandates - Markus Vogl (SPÖ), 6,816 votes.
- Party mandates - Johann Singer (ÖVP), 4,629 votes; and Bettina Zopf (ÖVP), 3,446 votes.

Substitutions:

- Markus Vogl (SPÖ) resigned on 6 January 2021 and was replaced by Elisabeth Feichtinger (SPÖ) on 7 January 2021.

===== 2017 =====
Results of the 2017 legislative election held on 15 October 2017:

Party		Votes per district					Total votes	%	Seats
Party		Gmun- den	Kirch- dorf	Steyr City	Steyr Rural	Voting card	Total votes	%	Seats
Social Democratic Party of Austria	SPÖ	19,652	8,642	8,371	11,359	181	48,205	30.02%	1
Austrian People's Party	ÖVP	18,479	11,661	3,919	13,530	164	47,753	29.74%	1
Freedom Party of Austria	FPÖ	16,093	9,915	5,635	10,306	103	42,052	26.19%	1
NEOS – The New Austria and Liberal Forum	NEOS	3,129	1,898	828	1,788	73	7,716	4.80%	0
Peter Pilz List	PILZ	2,648	1,129	909	1,384	68	6,138	3.82%	0
The Greens	GRÜNE	2,147	1,187	764	1,227	84	5,409	3.37%	0
My Vote Counts!	GILT	728	412	247	457	9	1,853	1.15%	0
Communist Party of Austria	KPÖ	353	162	154	182	19	870	0.54%	0
The Whites	WEIßE	209	78	34	76	3	400	0.25%	0
Free List Austria	FLÖ	68	28	12	39	0	147	0.09%	0
Socialist Left Party	SLP	27	6	5	5	0	43	0.03%	0
Valid Votes		63,533	35,118	20,878	40,353	704	160,586	100.00%	3
Rejected Votes		861	494	195	476	13	2,039	1.25%	
Total Polled		64,394	35,612	21,073	40,829	717	162,625	82.39%	
Registered Electors		78,562	43,323	27,423	48,067		197,375		
Turnout		81.97%	82.20%	76.84%	84.94%		82.39%		

The following candidates were elected:

- Personal mandates - Johann Singer (ÖVP), 7,040 votes.
- Party mandates - Gerhard Deimek (FPÖ), 1,624 votes; and Markus Vogl (SPÖ), 6,523 votes.

===== 2013 =====
Results of the 2013 legislative election held on 29 September 2013:

Party		Votes per district					Total votes	%	Seats
Party		Gmun- den	Kirch- dorf	Steyr City	Steyr Rural	Voting card	Total votes	%	Seats
Social Democratic Party of Austria	SPÖ	18,211	8,438	7,764	10,296	88	44,797	29.48%	1
Austrian People's Party	ÖVP	12,895	9,067	2,501	10,312	119	34,894	22.96%	1
Freedom Party of Austria	FPÖ	11,598	7,612	4,382	7,323	73	30,988	20.39%	1
The Greens	GRÜNE	7,684	3,537	2,609	4,375	186	18,391	12.10%	0
Team Stronach	FRANK	3,071	1,812	1,152	2,034	31	8,100	5.33%	0
Alliance for the Future of Austria	BZÖ	2,392	1,255	653	1,774	27	6,101	4.01%	0
NEOS – The New Austria	NEOS	2,351	1,008	735	1,190	67	5,351	3.52%	0
Pirate Party of Austria	PIRAT	479	323	152	258	14	1,226	0.81%	0
Communist Party of Austria	KPÖ	579	192	205	209	12	1,197	0.79%	0
Christian Party of Austria	CPÖ	277	161	54	154	1	647	0.43%	0
Der Wandel	WANDL	126	63	36	62	2	289	0.19%	0
Valid Votes		59,663	33,468	20,243	37,987	620	151,981	100.00%	3
Rejected Votes		1,680	824	387	960	5	3,856	2.47%	
Total Polled		61,343	34,292	20,630	38,947	625	155,837	78.76%	
Registered Electors		78,662	43,274	28,386	47,537		197,859		
Turnout		77.98%	79.24%	72.68%	81.93%		78.76%		

The following candidates were elected:

- Party mandates - Gerhard Deimek (FPÖ), 1,201 votes; Johann Singer (ÖVP), 3,551 votes; and Markus Vogl (SPÖ), 4,458 votes.

==== 2000s ====
===== 2008 =====
Results of the 2008 legislative election held on 28 September 2008:

Party		Votes per district					Total votes	%	Seats
Party		Gmun- den	Kirch- dorf	Steyr City	Steyr Rural	Voting card	Total votes	%	Seats
Social Democratic Party of Austria	SPÖ	20,933	9,952	9,406	11,978	351	52,620	33.15%	1
Austrian People's Party	ÖVP	14,346	10,297	3,108	11,591	450	39,792	25.07%	1
Freedom Party of Austria	FPÖ	10,395	6,092	3,975	6,224	216	26,902	16.95%	0
Alliance for the Future of Austria	BZÖ	6,187	3,377	1,979	4,258	178	15,979	10.07%	0
The Greens	GRÜNE	6,283	2,997	2,213	3,406	446	15,345	9.67%	0
Liberal Forum	LiF	848	418	362	391	69	2,088	1.32%	0
Fritz Dinkhauser List – Citizens' Forum Tyrol	FRITZ	689	359	203	559	22	1,832	1.15%	0
Independent Citizens' Initiative Save Austria	RETTÖ	702	297	187	316	12	1,514	0.95%	0
The Christians	DC	662	363	111	324	21	1,481	0.93%	0
Communist Party of Austria	KPÖ	519	205	172	203	18	1,117	0.70%	0
Left	LINKE	26	10	10	8	2	56	0.04%	0
Valid Votes		61,590	34,367	21,726	39,258	1,785	158,726	100.00%	2
Rejected Votes		1,943	922	446	1,065	28	4,404	2.70%	
Total Polled		63,533	35,289	22,172	40,323	1,813	163,130	82.54%	
Registered Electors		78,599	42,919	28,962	47,154		197,634		
Turnout		80.83%	82.22%	76.56%	85.51%		82.54%		

The following candidates were elected:

- Party mandates - Kurt Gartlehner (SPÖ), 3,443 votes; and Johann Singer (ÖVP), 2,090 votes. (Note: ÖVP: 1st placed candidate Wilhelm Molterer was elected on the federal list.)

===== 2006 =====
Results of the 2006 legislative election held on 1 October 2006:

Party		Votes per district					Total votes	%	Seats
Party		Gmun- den	Kirch- dorf	Steyr City	Steyr Rural	Voting card	Total votes	%	Seats
Social Democratic Party of Austria	SPÖ	23,009	11,024	10,584	13,057	2,049	59,723	39.01%	2
Austrian People's Party	ÖVP	17,960	12,472	4,098	13,599	2,562	50,691	33.11%	1
Freedom Party of Austria	FPÖ	6,572	3,906	2,598	3,753	544	17,373	11.35%	0
The Greens	GRÜNE	5,692	2,773	2,066	3,169	1,666	15,366	10.04%	0
Hans-Peter Martin's List	MATIN	1,944	881	548	972	154	4,499	2.94%	0
Alliance for the Future of Austria	BZÖ	1,505	851	520	1,056	179	4,111	2.69%	0
Communist Party of Austria	KPÖ	569	215	218	257	59	1,318	0.86%	0
Valid Votes		57,251	32,122	20,632	35,863	7,213	153,081	100.00%	3
Rejected Votes		1,627	750	362	783	119	3,641	2.32%	
Total Polled		58,878	32,872	20,994	36,646	7,332	156,722	82.19%	
Registered Electors		75,791	41,215	28,558	45,109		190,673		
Turnout		77.68%	79.76%	73.51%	81.24%		82.19%		

The following candidates were elected:

- Party mandates - Kurt Gartlehner (SPÖ), 4,935 votes; Walter Murauer (ÖVP), 1,329 votes; and Rainer Wimmer (SPÖ), 4,641 votes. (Note: ÖVP: 1st placed candidate Wilhelm Molterer was elected in Upper Austria.)

===== 2002 =====
Results of the 2002 legislative election held on 24 November 2002:

Party		Votes per district					Total votes	%	Seats
Party		Gmun- den	Kirch- dorf	Steyr City	Steyr Rural	Voting card	Total votes	%	Seats
Austrian People's Party	ÖVP	22,635	15,048	6,120	16,793	2,702	63,298	40.22%	2
Social Democratic Party of Austria	SPÖ	24,743	11,709	11,552	13,634	1,529	63,167	40.14%	2
Freedom Party of Austria	FPÖ	6,169	3,643	2,221	3,298	404	15,735	10.00%	0
The Greens	GRÜNE	4,975	2,134	2,038	2,468	1,502	13,117	8.34%	0
Liberal Forum	LiF	520	192	228	264	86	1,290	0.82%	0
Communist Party of Austria	KPÖ	340	129	121	150	18	758	0.48%	0
Valid Votes		59,382	32,855	22,280	36,607	6,241	157,365	100.00%	4
Rejected Votes		1,258	615	295	608	43	2,819	1.76%	
Total Polled		60,640	33,470	22,575	37,215	6,284	160,184	87.09%	
Registered Electors		72,973	39,730	28,244	42,986		183,933		
Turnout		83.10%	84.24%	79.93%	86.57%		87.09%		

The following candidates were elected:

- Party mandates - Kurt Gartlehner (SPÖ), 5,327 votes; Wilhelm Molterer (ÖVP), 8,223 votes; Walter Murauer (ÖVP), 1,767 votes; and Rainer Wimmer (SPÖ), 5,556 votes.

==== 1990s ====
===== 1999 =====
Results of the 1999 legislative election held on 3 October 1999:

Party		Votes per district					Total votes	%	Seats
Party		Gmun- den	Kirch- dorf	Steyr City	Steyr Rural	Voting card	Total votes	%	Seats
Social Democratic Party of Austria	SPÖ	21,149	9,996	9,665	11,473	1,701	53,984	35.88%	2
Freedom Party of Austria	FPÖ	15,034	8,942	6,093	8,434	1,260	39,763	26.43%	1
Austrian People's Party	ÖVP	13,937	9,539	3,070	11,204	1,781	39,531	26.27%	1
The Greens	GRÜNE	4,132	1,958	1,672	2,205	1,019	10,986	7.30%	0
Liberal Forum	LiF	1,449	594	622	602	535	3,802	2.53%	0
The Independents	DU	467	170	233	260	48	1,178	0.78%	0
No to NATO and EU – Neutral Austria Citizens' Initiative	NEIN	345	140	66	150	16	717	0.48%	0
Communist Party of Austria	KPÖ	188	79	133	82	22	504	0.33%	0
Valid Votes		56,701	31,418	21,554	34,410	6,382	150,465	100.00%	4
Rejected Votes		1,147	549	267	560	53	2,576	1.68%	
Total Polled		57,848	31,967	21,821	34,970	6,435	153,041	84.14%	
Registered Electors		72,126	38,971	28,765	42,022		181,884		
Turnout		80.20%	82.03%	75.86%	83.22%		84.14%		

The following candidates were elected:

- Party mandates - Gerhard Fallent (FPÖ), 1,575 votes; Kurt Gartlehner (SPÖ), 4,253 votes; Wilhelm Molterer (ÖVP), 5,086 votes; and Rainer Wimmer (SPÖ), 4,564 votes.

Substitutions:

- Wilhelm Molterer (ÖVP) resigned on 7 February 2000 and was replaced by Walter Murauer (ÖVP) on 8 February 2000.

===== 1995 =====
Results of the 1995 legislative election held on 17 December 1995:

Party		Votes per district					Total votes	%	Seats
Party		Gmun- den	Kirch- dorf	Steyr City	Steyr Rural	Voting card	Total votes	%	Seats
Social Democratic Party of Austria	SPÖ	24,999	11,662	12,162	13,080	1,402	63,305	40.59%	2
Austrian People's Party	ÖVP	14,719	10,176	3,622	11,768	1,520	41,805	26.80%	1
Freedom Party of Austria	FPÖ	12,596	7,510	5,358	7,150	815	33,429	21.43%	1
The Greens	GRÜNE	2,912	1,402	1,241	1,647	871	8,073	5.18%	0
Liberal Forum	LiF	2,583	1,081	1,253	1,131	707	6,755	4.33%	0
No – Civic Action Group; Against the Sale of Austria	NEIN	1,134	419	220	430	50	2,253	1.44%	0
Communist Party of Austria	KPÖ	150	46	92	56	11	355	0.23%	0
Valid Votes		59,093	32,296	23,948	35,262	5,376	155,975	100.00%	4
Rejected Votes		1,527	755	446	760	65	3,553	2.23%	
Total Polled		60,620	33,051	24,394	36,022	5,441	159,528	88.71%	
Registered Electors		71,060	38,326	29,399	41,047		179,832		
Turnout		85.31%	86.24%	82.98%	87.76%		88.71%		

The following candidates were elected:

- Party mandates - Kurt Gartlehner (SPÖ), 4,515 votes; Elfriede Madl (FPÖ), 1,227 votes; Walter Murauer (ÖVP), 1,623 votes; and Rainer Wimmer (SPÖ), 4,974 votes.

===== 1994 =====
Results of the 1994 legislative election held on 9 October 1994:

Party		Votes per district					Total votes	%	Seats
Party		Gmun- den	Kirch- dorf	Steyr City	Steyr Rural	Voting card	Total votes	%	Seats
Social Democratic Party of Austria	SPÖ	22,075	10,373	10,644	11,663	1,487	56,242	37.64%	2
Austrian People's Party	ÖVP	13,619	9,154	3,053	10,877	1,417	38,120	25.51%	1
Freedom Party of Austria	FPÖ	12,610	7,472	5,404	7,098	940	33,524	22.44%	1
The Greens	GRÜNE	4,047	2,052	1,871	2,456	1,012	11,438	7.66%	0
Liberal Forum	LiF	2,625	1,127	1,263	1,173	652	6,840	4.58%	0
No – Civic Action Group; Against the Sale of Austria	NEIN	670	308	157	272	49	1,456	0.97%	0
Christian Voters Community	CWG	433	231	53	282	25	1,024	0.69%	0
Communist Party of Austria	KPÖ	113	44	102	39	11	309	0.21%	0
United Greens Austria – List Adi Pinter	VGÖ	134	32	26	34	10	236	0.16%	0
Natural Law Party	ÖNP	102	40	24	51	6	223	0.15%	0
Valid Votes		56,428	30,833	22,597	33,945	5,609	149,412	100.00%	4
Rejected Votes		1,422	746	356	730	41	3,295	2.16%	
Total Polled		57,850	31,579	22,953	34,675	5,650	152,707	84.92%	
Registered Electors		71,011	38,214	29,566	41,024		179,815		
Turnout		81.47%	82.64%	77.63%	84.52%		84.92%		

The following candidates were elected:

- Party mandates - Kurt Gartlehner (SPÖ), 5,044 votes; Elfriede Madl (FPÖ), 1,354 votes; Walter Murauer (ÖVP), 3,014 votes; and Rainer Wimmer (SPÖ), 4,576 votes.
