= Fritz Prechtl =

Austrian politician (1923–2004)

Fritz Prechtl (27 December 1923 – 12 September 2004) was an Austrian trade unionist and politician.

Born in Vienna, Prechtl completed an apprenticeship as a locksmith, then worked as a fitter on the Austrian Federal Railway (ÖBB). He joined the Railway Workers' Union (GdE), becoming chair of his local branch in 1950 and serving on the central committee for ÖBB employees from 1959. In 1965, he was elected as president of the GdE, and the following year, he became vice-president of the Vienna Trades Council.

In 1971, Prechtl was elected as president of the International Transport Workers' Federation. He was also a member of the Social Democratic Party of Austria, for which he was elected to the Federal Council in 1971, serving until 1975, when he switched to serve in the National Council. He retired from all his posts in 1986.

Trade union offices
Preceded by Josef Matecjek	President of the Railway Workers' Union; 1965–1986	Succeeded by Johann Schmölz
Preceded by Hans Düby	President of the International Transport Workers' Federation; 1971–1986	Succeeded by Jim Hunter
