= Malta Workers' Union =

National trade union center

UHM Voice of the Workers
- UHM – Voice of the Workers
- UHM Voice of the Workers
- Founded: 29 September 1966 by Salvino Spiteri
- Headquarters: Floriana, Malta
- Location: Malta
- Members: 26,200
- Key people: Jesmond Bonello, Director; Josef Vella, CEO; Edwin Balzan, Assistant Director; Gian Paul Gauci, Assistant Director
- Affiliations: INFEDOP, CMTU, MCESD, MEUSAC, EUROFEDOP, World Organization of Workers EZA
- Website: www.uhm.org.mt

The UHM Voice of the Workers is a national trade union center in Malta. It was founded on 29 September 1966, under the name Malta Government Clerical Union (MGCU), and changed its name in 1978 to UHM. The union has members in both the private and public sectors, and emphasizes its political independence. This derives from the polarisation of the political set-up that affects trade unionism in Malta. Amongst the founder members of the Malta Workers Union (UHM), Salvino Spiteri and Maurice Agius respectively were the Union's first President and Secretary General.

The UHM is affiliated with the Confederation of Malta Trade Unions (CMTU), which is in turn affiliated to the International Trade Union Confederation. It represents Maltese workers in various fora including Malta Council of Economic and Social Development (MCESD) and Malta European Steering and Action Committee (MEUSAC).

== History ==
The Union Haddiema Maghqudin (UHM) was founded on 29 September 1966, under the name of Malta Government Clerical Union (MGCU) with membership restricted to clerical employees in the public service. The Union was very well received by clerical employees, and its membership immediately grew. Its fruitful services to members and the various achievements in improving the conditions of work of clerical employees soon made the MGCU very popular among employees in the public service. It was recognised as a Union which acted and delivered. It was therefore not surprising that the Union was being continuously asked and pressed to extend its membership to all employees in the public sector.

The several requests made to the Union for the extension of membership could not be ignored and, therefore, after making the necessary arrangements to ensure that it would cope with the added volume of work that such an extension would bring upon it, by Resolution of the June 1973 General Conference, the Union changed its name to Malta Government Employees Union (MGEU) and membership was extended to all categories of workers in the public service, parastatal bodies and public corporations. Following this extension, membership increased considerably and the Union continued to get stronger and to command more influence in the trade union field.

The year 1977 was characterised by a wave of industrial unrest due to several arbitrary changes in the conditions of work of employees in the public sector. In the case of a large number of Public Service employees, vacation leave was reduced drastically. Public holidays for both public and private sector employees were also cut down substantially. Workers on sick leave, in both the public and private sectors, were enjoined to report their sickness at local police stations and policemen called at their homes, at any time of the day, to ascertain that those reporting sick actually stayed at home – a new version of house arrest. All this was done without any consultations whatsoever.

This Union launched a protest campaign and directed workers to resort to partial industrial action. Although these were mild actions, the government's reaction was unduly strong and drastic. Repressive punitive measures were taken against workers who followed Unions' directives. Government decreed that partial industrial action was not to be tolerated. At the time, unfortunately, not all the unions on the Island realised the gravity of the situation.

In the light of the prevailing circumstances, it was felt absolutely necessary to make a serious evaluation of the situation. The need to strengthen the local free trade union movement was strongly felt and to this effect it was resolved to have another general Union which could also offer membership to workers in the Private Sector.

Work on such a project was immediately taken in hand by the General Council of the Union. A number of small craft unions were approached and these were found more than forthcoming. They agreed to merge within the folds of such a Union. Various groups of workers in the Private Sector also showed their readiness to join.

On 13 July 1978, the Union's General Conference unanimously adopted a Resolution whereby the MGEU was to become the UNION HADDIEMA MAGHQUDIN which, besides widening the aims of the Union, also opened its doors to all workers irrespective of class, sector or grade. The new name of the Union – UNION HADDIEMA MAGHQUDIN (UHM), together with the necessary amendments to its Constitution, were registered with the Registrar of Trade Unions on 8 August 1978.

The Union Haddiema Maghqudin was formed as an alternative for workers who prefer free trade unionism. Most craft unions merged with the UHM, with a few exceptions among the larger ones, and workers from all sectors joined its ranks. The Union's membership grew substantially within a very short time.

Soon the Union felt that, in view of the increase in membership, it could not function effectively from the premises that it occupied in Valletta, as these had become rather inadequate. So the General Council decided that a new General Headquarters should be found. The new offices, from where the Union still operates, were inaugurated on 29 September 1989, i.e. on the Union's twenty-third anniversary.

The membership of the Union Haddiema Maghqudin continued to grow steadily, and in March 1996 the Union decided once more to extend its membership, this time to include pensioners. This again resulted in a significant number of new members, who before were barred from joining the UHM.

The UHM today represents over 26,000 members and includes workers from all walks of life and also pensioners.

== Objectives ==
- to unite workers into one strong homogeneous body;
- to enhance the dignity of the worker and to improve his conditions of work as well as his economic and social standing;
- to gain proper representation on bodies where its presence would further the interests of its members;
- to achieve and maintain unity of purpose and action among members;
- to foster trade unionism among all workers and at all levels;
- to educate workers in those matters that affect them; and
- to ascertain a good standard of living for pensioners and those who retire from work.

== Structure ==
Malta Workers' Union is governed through various bodies namely:

1. The General Conference
2. The General Council
3. The Sections' General Meeting
4. The Sections' Executive Committee

=== The General Conference ===
The General Conference is convened every four years. It is the highest governing body in the Union and every decision on any issue dealt in the conference is final. During the General Conference the highest officials in the Union are elected, namely the General Secretary, President and Vice President.

=== The General Council ===
The General Council is convened frequently. It is responsible to execute any decisions taken by the General Conference. It is also responsible to discuss the day-to-day running of the Union.

=== The Sections' General Meeting ===
The Sections' General Meeting is convened biannually. It is responsible in electing the officials of the section and adopts the administrative report of the section.

=== The Sections' Executive Committee ===
The Sections' Executive Committee is the body that governs the section as long as it does not go against the policy of the Union.
