= Hoefler =

Hoefler may refer to:

- Don Hoefler (1922–1986), American journalist credited with coining the term "Silicon Valley"
- Jonathan Hoefler (born 1970), American typeface designer
  - Hoefler & Co., type foundry based in New York
  - Hoefler Text, serif typeface designed by Jonathan Hoefler

== See also ==
- Höfler
