= Nicolás Redondo =

Spanish trade unionist and politician (1927–2023)

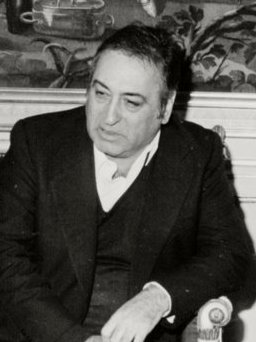
- Redondo in 1983

Secretary-General of the Unión General de Trabajadores
- In office 18 April 1976 – 22 November 1994
- Preceded by: Manuel Muiño Arroyo
- Succeeded by: Cándido Méndez

Member of the Congress of Deputies
- In office 13 July 1977 – 22 October 1987
- Constituency: Biscay

Personal details
- Born: Nicolás Redondo Urbieta; 16 June 1927; Barakaldo, Spain
- Died: 3 January 2023 (aged 95); Madrid, Spain
- Political party: PSOE

Nicolás Redondo Urbieta (16 June 1927 – 3 January 2023) was a Spanish trade unionist and politician. A member of the Spanish Socialist Workers' Party, he served as secretary-general of the Unión General de Trabajadores from 1976 to 1994 and was a deputy from 1977 to 1987.

Redondo died in Madrid on 3 January 2023, at the age of 95.
