= Josef Riedl =

Austrian sculptor

- Born: 12 March 1884; Vienna, Austria-Hungary
- Died: 16 November 1965 (aged 81); Vienna, Austria
- Occupation: Sculptor

Josef Riedl (12 March 1884 – 16 November 1965) was an Austrian sculptor. His work was part of the sculpture event in the art competition at the 1936 Summer Olympics.

Sculpture of laborer on the Younion headquarters, Vienna
