= Railway Workers' Union (Austria) =

The Union of Railway Employees (German: Gewerkschaft der Eisenbahner, GdE) was a trade union representing railway workers in Austria.

The union was founded in 1945 by the Austrian Trade Union Federation. By 1998, it had 103,432 members. In 2006, it merged with the Hotel, Catering and Personal Services Union and the Commerce and Transport Union, to form Vida.

== Presidents ==
1945: Richard Freund
1962: Josef Matecjek
1965: Fritz Prechtl
1987: Johann Schmölz
1989: Franz Hums
1995: Gerhard Nowak
1999: Wilhelm Haberzettl
