= Elisabeth Feichtinger =

Austrian politician (born 1987)

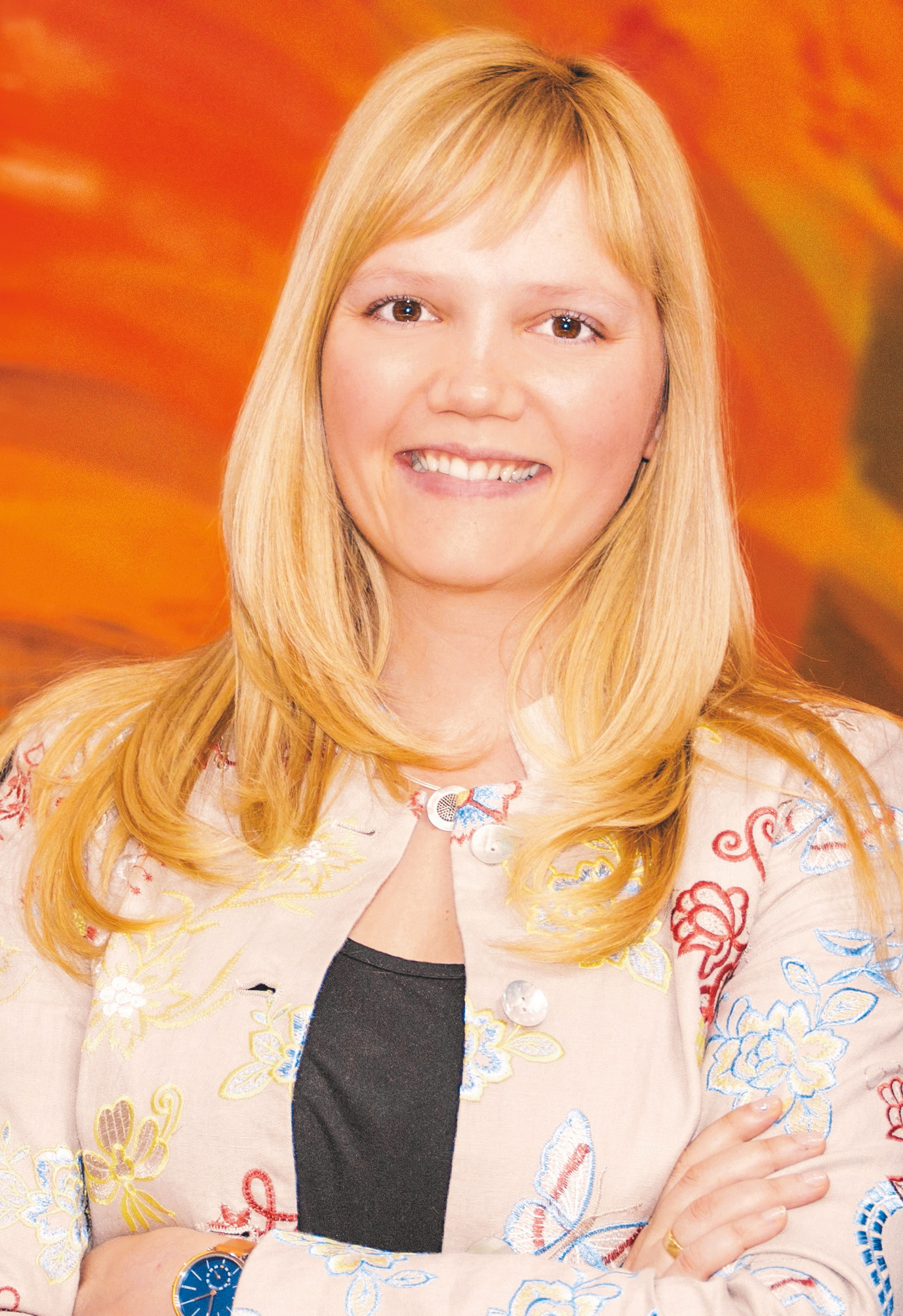
- Feichtinger in 2018

Member of the National Council
- Incumbent
- Assumed office 7 January 2021
- Preceded by: Markus Vogl
- Constituency: Traunviertel
- In office 9 November 2017 – 22 October 2019
- Constituency: Federal list

Personal details
- Born: 24 September 1987 (age 38)
- Party: Social Democratic Party

Elisabeth Feichtinger (born 24 September 1987) is an Austrian politician of the Social Democratic Party. She has been a member of the National Council since 2021, having previously served from 2017 to 2019. From 2015 to 2021, she served as mayor of Altmünster.
