= World Confederation of Teachers =

The World Confederation of Teachers (WCT) was a global union federation bringing together unions representing teachers.

The federation originated in 1963, when the International Federation of Employees in Public Service (INFEDOP), an affiliate of what became the World Confederation of Labour (WCL), established a section for teachers, the International Trade Union Council of Teachers. In 1970, it became the "World Confederation of Teachers", and in 1973, it became independent of INFEDOP, affiliating directly to the WCL.

By 1979, the federation claimed an affiliated membership of 1,000,000 workers. In 2006, the WCL merged into the new International Trade Union Confederation, and the WCT decided in March 2007 to merge into the Education International.

== Affiliates ==
The following unions were affiliated in 1979:

Union	Country
Christian Fraction of the Schoolteachers' Section of the Public Services Union	Austria
Christian Teachers' Association	Belgium
Christian Union of Staff in Free Primary and Secondary Education	Belgium
Christian Union of Staff in Technical Colleges	Belgium
Christian Union of Staff Members in Government Education	Belgium
Public Services	Belgium
Fédération nationale des enseignants Quebecois	Canada
Cayman Teachers' Association	Cayman Islands
Syndicat national des enseignants Centraficains	Central African Republic
Comision Nacional de Trabajadores de la Educación del FUT	Chile
Asociación Tolimense Profesores de Ensenanze Secundaria Oficial	Colombia
Sindicato de Educadores Costarricences	Costa Rica
Asociacion de Profesores de Segunda Ensenanza	Costa Rica
Union nacional de educadores	Dominican Republic
Fédération de l'enseignement privé	France
Syndicat général de l'education nationale	France
Association for Education and Training	West Germany
Ghana Local Authority Teachers' Association	Ghana
Sindicato de Trabajadores de la Educación Privada	Guatamala
Government School Non-Graduate Teachers' Union	Hong Kong
ITCEU Delhi Industrial Training Institute	India
Indian Confederation of Teachers	India
All-India Federation of Industrial Training Institutes' Employees	India
Persatuan Guru Katolik	Indonesia
Persatuan Guru Kristen Indonesia	Indonesia
Fédération général des syndicats chrétiens de la fonction publique de Madagascar	Madagascar
Syndicat national des instituteurs publics de Madagascar	Madagascar
Catholic Education Association	Netherlands
Protestant Christian Teachers' Association	Netherlands
Vereniging van Leerkrachten Aruba	Netherlands Antilles
Rizal Public School Teachers' Association	Philippines
Fédération nationale des travailleurs de la fonction publique	Senegal
Metropolitan Teachers' Association	Thailand
Caribbean Association of Catholic Teachers	Trinidad and Tobago
Federación Nacional de Sindicatos Autonomos de los Trabajadores de la Educación Venezolana	Venezuela
Movimento Magisterial Social Cristiano Sindicators Autonomos de la Educación Merida	Venezuela
Colegio de Peritos y Tecnicos Industriales de Venezuela	Venezuela

== Leadership ==
=== General Secretaries ===
1970s: Coen Damen
1987: Roger Denis
1996: Gaston De La Haye

=== Presidents ===
1970s: Frans Valvekens
1980s: Sef van Werberg
