= Union of Textile, Clothing and Leather Workers =

Trade union representing textile, clothing, and leather workers in Austria

The Union of Textile, Clothing and Leather Workers (German: Gewerkschaft Textil-Bekleidung-Leder, GTBL) was a trade union representing workers in a variety of related industries in Austria.

The union was founded in 1945 by the Austrian Trade Union Federation. Its membership fell over the years, and by 1998, was only 18,439. In 2000, it merged with the Union of Metal, Mining and Energy, to form the Metal Textile Union.

== Presidents ==
1945: Michael Frühwirth
1958:(?)
1984: Harald Ettl
