= Vida (trade union) =

Trade union representing workers

- Established: 2006; 20 years ago
- Merger of: Railway Workers' Union, Commerce and Transport Union, & Hotel, Catering and Personal Services Union
- Type: Trade union
- Headquarters: Johann-Böhm-Platz 1; 1020 Vienna
- Location: Austria
- Coordinates: 48.2053916°N 16.4295119°E
- Fields: Transport & hospitality industries
- Members: 137,553 (2014)
- Official language: Austrian German
- Affiliations: OGB, UNI, IUF, & ITF
- Website: www.vida.at/en

Vida is a trade union representing workers in the transport and service industries in Austria.

The union was founded in December 2006, when the Railway Workers' Union merged with the Commerce and Transport Union and the Hotel, Catering and Personal Services Union. By 2014, it had 137,553 members, making it the fifth-largest affiliate of the Austrian Trade Union Federation. It is affiliated to the Union Network International, International Union of Food, Agricultural, Hotel, Restaurant, Catering, Tobacco and Allied Workers' Associations and International Transport Workers' Federation.

== Presidents ==
2006: Rudolf Kaske
2012: Gottfried Winkler
2016: Roman Hebenstreit
