= Union of Artists, Media Workers and Freelance Workers =

Austrian trade union

The Union of Artists, Media Workers and Freelance Workers (German: Gewerkschaft für Kunst, Medien, Sport und freie Berufe, KMSfB) was a trade union representing Austrian workers in a variety of industries.

The union was founded in 1945 by the Austrian Trade Union Federation. By 1998, it had 16,202 members, with 60% working in the arts, 20% in paper and printing, and most of the remainder in business services. In 2009, the union merged with the much larger Union of Municipal Employees, to form the Union of Municipal Employees, Art, Media, Sport and Freelance Workers.
