= Commerce and Transport Union =

Trade union in Austria

The Commerce and Transport Union (German: Gewerkschaft Handel, Transport, Verkehr, HTV) was a trade union representing workers in the distribution industry in Austria.

The union was founded in 1945 by the Austrian Trade Union Federation. By 1998, it had only 35,715 members. In 2006, it merged with the Railway Workers' Union and the Hotel, Catering and Personal Services Union, to form Vida.

== Presidents ==
1945: Karl Weigl
1954: Wilhelm Svetelsky
1966: Johann Roposs
1978:
1986: Robert Zehenthofer
1990: Peter Schneider
