= Bettina Zopf =

Austrian politician (born 1974)

Member of the National Council
- Incumbent
- Assumed office 23 October 2019
- Constituency: Traunviertel

Personal details
- Born: 19 July 1974 (age 51)
- Party: People's Party

Bettina Zopf (born 19 July 1974) is an Austrian politician of the People's Party serving as a member of the National Council since 2019. She is a municipal councillor of Altmünster.
