= Cándido Méndez Rodríguez =

Spanish trade unionist

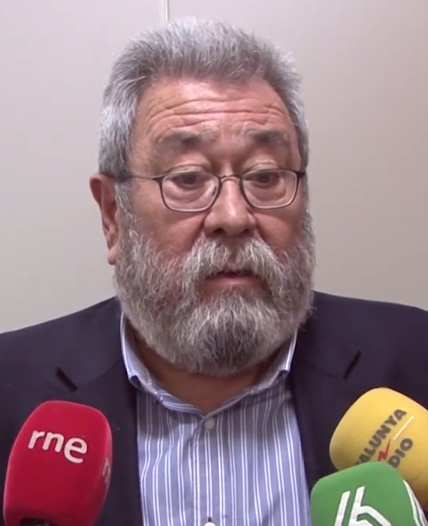
Méndez in 2014

Cándido Méndez Rodríguez (born 28 January 1952) is a former Spanish trade union leader and politician.

Born in Badajoz, his father was Cándido Méndez Núñez, a politician active in the Spanish Socialist Workers' Party (PSOE). Méndez qualified as a chemical engineer in Madrid, also joining the PSOE, then moved to Barcelona for work. He was elected in 1979 to the Congress of Deputies, representing Jaén, and serving until 1986.

Méndez also joined the Unión General de Trabajadores (UGT), and in 1980 he was elected as its secretary for Jaén, then in 1986 as secretary for Andalusia. In 1994, he was elected as general secretary of the national UGT. In 2003, he was additionally elected as president of the European Trade Union Confederation, serving until 2007. He retired from the UGT in 2016.

Trade union offices
Preceded by Nicolás Redondo	General Secretary of the Unión General de Trabajadores; 1994–2016	Succeeded by Pepe Álvarez Suárez
Preceded by Fritz Verzetnitsch	President of the European Trade Union Confederation; 2003–2007	Succeeded by Wanja Lundby-Wedin
