= Gerhard Deimek =

Austrian politician (born 1963)

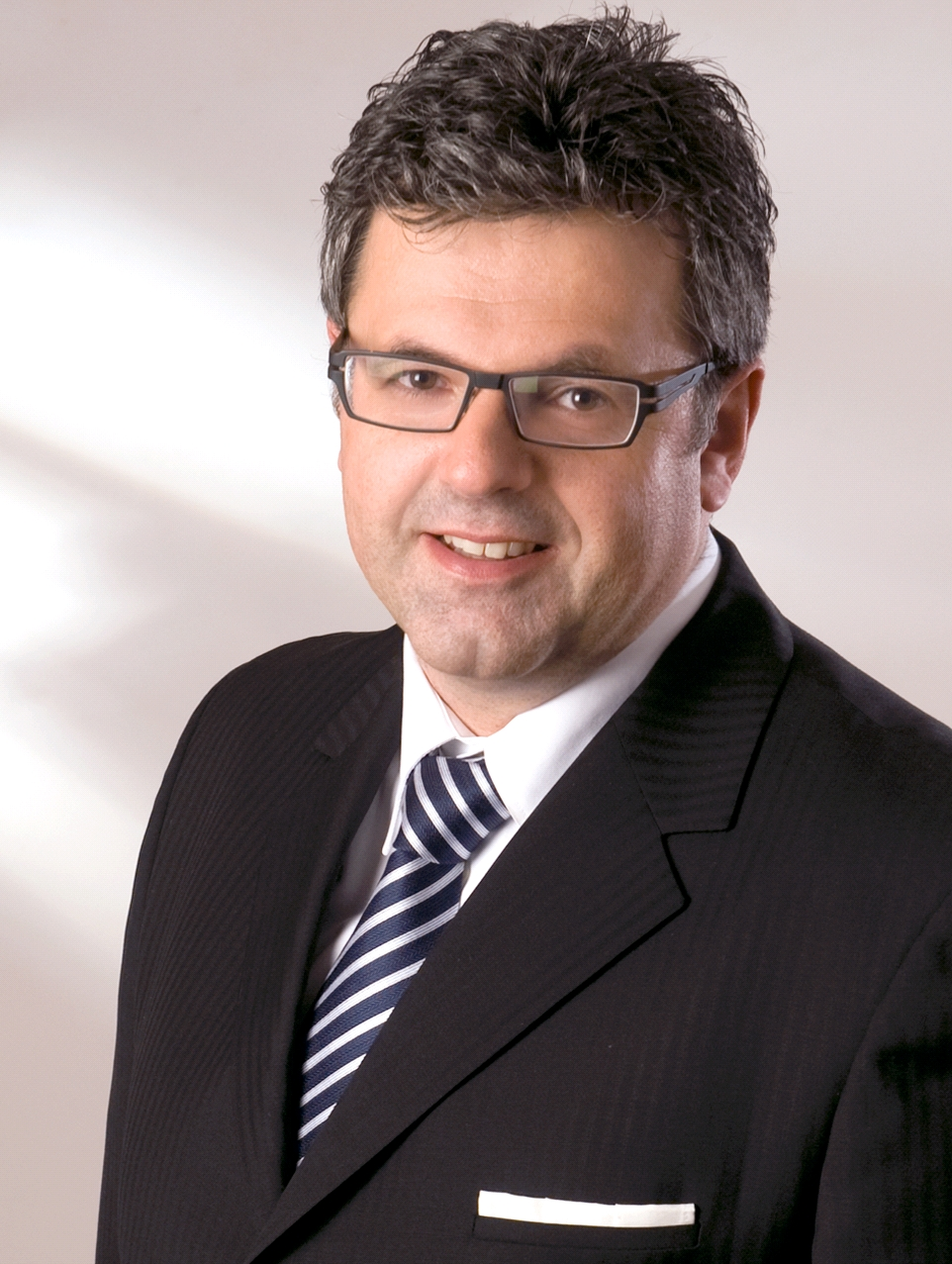

Member of the National Council
- Incumbent
- Assumed office 28 October 2008
- Constituency: 4D Traunviertel

Personal details
- Born: 9 January 1963 (age 63)
- Party: Freedom Party of Austria

Gerhard Deimek (born 9 January 1963) is an Austrian politician who has been a Member of the National Council for the Freedom Party of Austria (FPÖ) since 2008.
