= Confederation of Malta Trade Unions =

National trade union center in Malta

CMTU
- Confederation of Malta Trade Unions
- Founded: 1959
- Headquarters: Valletta, Malta
- Location: Malta
- Members: 36,000
- Key people: Jesmond Bonello, Administrative Secretary, William Portelli, President, Arthur Rossi, Vice-President, Dr. Martin Balzan, Vice-President
- Affiliations: ITUC, ETUC
- Website: www.cmtu.org.mt

The Confederation of Malta Trade Unions (CMTU) is a national trade union center in Malta. It has a membership of 30,000.

The CMTU has no political party affiliations, and its constitution, while placing certain obligations on the affiliates of the Confederation, leaves the individual organisations free to act as they deem best in the interests of their members. The objectives of the Confederation are to promote the interests of its affiliates and to further the ideals of a democratic trade union movement as well as to improve generally the economic and social conditions of workers.

The CMTU is affiliated with the International Trade Union Confederation and European Trade Union Confederation. It represents Maltese workers in various fora including Malta Council of Economic and Social Development (MCESD) and Malta European Steering and Action Committee (MEUSAC).

It includes a cross section of large and smaller trade unions namely the Union Haddiema Maghqudin, the Malta Union of Bank Employees, Lotto Receivers Union, Chamber of Pharmacists, Medical Association of Malta, Union Haddiema Universita ta' Malta, Malta Union of Professional Psychologists.
