= Metal-Textile-Food Union =

Defunct Austrian trade union

The Metal-Textile-Food Union (German: Gewerkschaft Metall-Textil-Nahrung, GMTN) was a trade union representing workers in manufacturing, mining, and agriculture in Austria.

The union was founded on 10 May 2006, when the Metal-Textile Union merged with the Union of Agriculture, Food and Allied Industries. The two unions had been working closely together for some time, sharing offices in Vienna from 2002, and using a joint website from the start of 2006.

Like its predecessors, the union affiliated to the Austrian Trade Union Federation. The union initially had 230,000 members, and was led by Erich Foglar.

In 2009, the union merged with the Chemical Workers' Union, to form PRO-GE.
