= Union of Workers in Food and Allied Industries =

The Union of Workers in Food and Allied Industries (German: Gewerkschaft der Lebensmittel und Genussarbeiter, GLB) was a trade union representing workers in food production, tobacco manufacture, and related industries, in Austria.

The union was founded by the Austrian Trade Union Federation in 1945. By 1990, it had 39,517 members. The following year, it merged with the Union of Agricultural and Forestry Workers, to form the Union of Agriculture, Food and Allied Industries.

== Presidents ==
1945: Karl Mantler
1960: Josef Staribacher
1989: Leopold Simperl
