= Younion =

Trade union in Austria

- Younion: The Public Services Union
- Younion: Die Daseinsgewerkshaft

- Headquarters building detail of Josef Riedl sculpture holding a May Day flag
- Established: 2015; 11 years ago
- Merger of: Union of Municipal Employees & Union of Artists, Media Workers and Freelance Workers
- Type: Trade union
- Headquarters: Maria-Theresien-Straße 11, 1090 Vienna
- Location: Austria
- Coordinates: 48.2155741°N 16.3611923°E
- Fields: Municipal workers, media workers
- Members: 150,394 (2014)
- Official language: Austrian German
- Affiliations: Austrian Trade Union Federation (OGB)
- Website: www.younion.at
- Formerly called: Union of Municipal Employees, Art, Media, Sport and Freelance Workers

Younion is a trade union representing municipal workers, and workers in the media and arts, in Austria.

The union was founded in 2009, when the Union of Municipal Employees merged with the Union of Artists, Media Workers and Freelance Workers. It was originally named the Union of Municipal Employees, Art, Media, Sport and Freelance Workers, but shortened its name in 2015.

By 2014, the union had 150,394 members, making it the fourth largest affiliate of the Austrian Trade Union Federation. Since its formation, the union has been led by Christian Meidlinger.

== Presidents ==
2009: Christian Meidlinger
