= Union of Postal and Telecommunications Workers =

Austrian communication workers union

- Gewerkschaft für Post- und Fernmeldebedienstete
- Abbreviation: GPF
- Established: 1945; 81 years ago
- Type: Trade union
- Headquarters: Johann-Böhm-Platz 1; 1020 Vienna
- Location: Austria
- Coordinates: 48.2053916°N 16.4295119°E
- Field: Postal
- Members: 78,436 (1998)
- Official language: Austrian German
- Chairperson: Richard Köhler
- Managing Director: Christian Decker
- Affiliations: Austrian Trade Union Federation (OGB)
- Website: www.gpf.at

Union of Postal and Telecommunications Workers (German: Gewerkschaft für Post- und Fernmeldebedienstete, GPF) is a trade union representing communication workers in Austria.

The union was founded in 1945 by the Austrian Trade Union Federation. By 1998, it had 78,436 members. Historically, almost all the union's members worked for Post und Telekom Austria, but following privatisation and the entry of competitors into the market, it now has members in a variety of companies.
