= Metal-Textile Union =

The Metal-Textile Union (German: Gewerkschaft Metall-Textil, GMT) was a trade union representing manufacturing workers and miners in Austria.

The union was founded in 2000, when the Union of Metal, Mining and Energy (GMBE) merged with the Union of Textile, Clothing and Leather Workers. The union was led by Rudolf Nürnberger, former president of the GMBE.

In 2002, the union began sharing offices in Vienna with the Union of Agriculture, Food and Allied Industries. The two unions merged on 10 May 2006, forming the Metal-Textile-Food Union.
