= Chemical Workers' Union (Austria) =

Defunct Austrian trade union

The Chemical Workers' Union (German: Gewerkschaft der Chemiearbeiter, GdC) was a trade union representing workers in the chemical industry in Austria.

The union was founded in 1945 by the Austrian Trade Union Federation. By 1998, it had 37,941 members. In 2009, it merged with the Metal-Textile-Food Union, to form PRO-GE.

== Presidents ==
1945: Robert Pipelka
1949: Eduard Schwab
1962: Georg Grossauer
1975: Wilhelm Hrdlitschka
Josef Eder
2001: Wilhelm Beck
