= Union of Private Sector Employees =

The Union of Private Sector Employees (German: Gewerkschaft der Privatangestellten, GPA) was a trade union representing white collar workers in Austria.

The union was founded in 1945 by the Austrian Trade Union Federation. It became the largest affiliate of the federation in 1978, and by 1998, it had 298,044 members. It was strongest among white collar manufacturing workers, but also had many members in banking and commerce. Despite being the largest union in Austria, its membership density was only 30%.

In 1989, the union became the first in Austria to elect a woman as president. In November 2006, it merged with the Union of Printing, Journalism, and Paper, to form the Union of Private Sector Employees, Printing, Journalism, and Paper.

== Presidents ==
1945: Friedrich Hillegeist
1962: Rudolf Häuser
1974: Alfred Dallinger
J. Livi
1989: Eleonora Hostasch
1994: Hans Sallmutter
2005: Wolfgang Katzian
