= Barbara Teiber =

Austrian politician (born 1977)

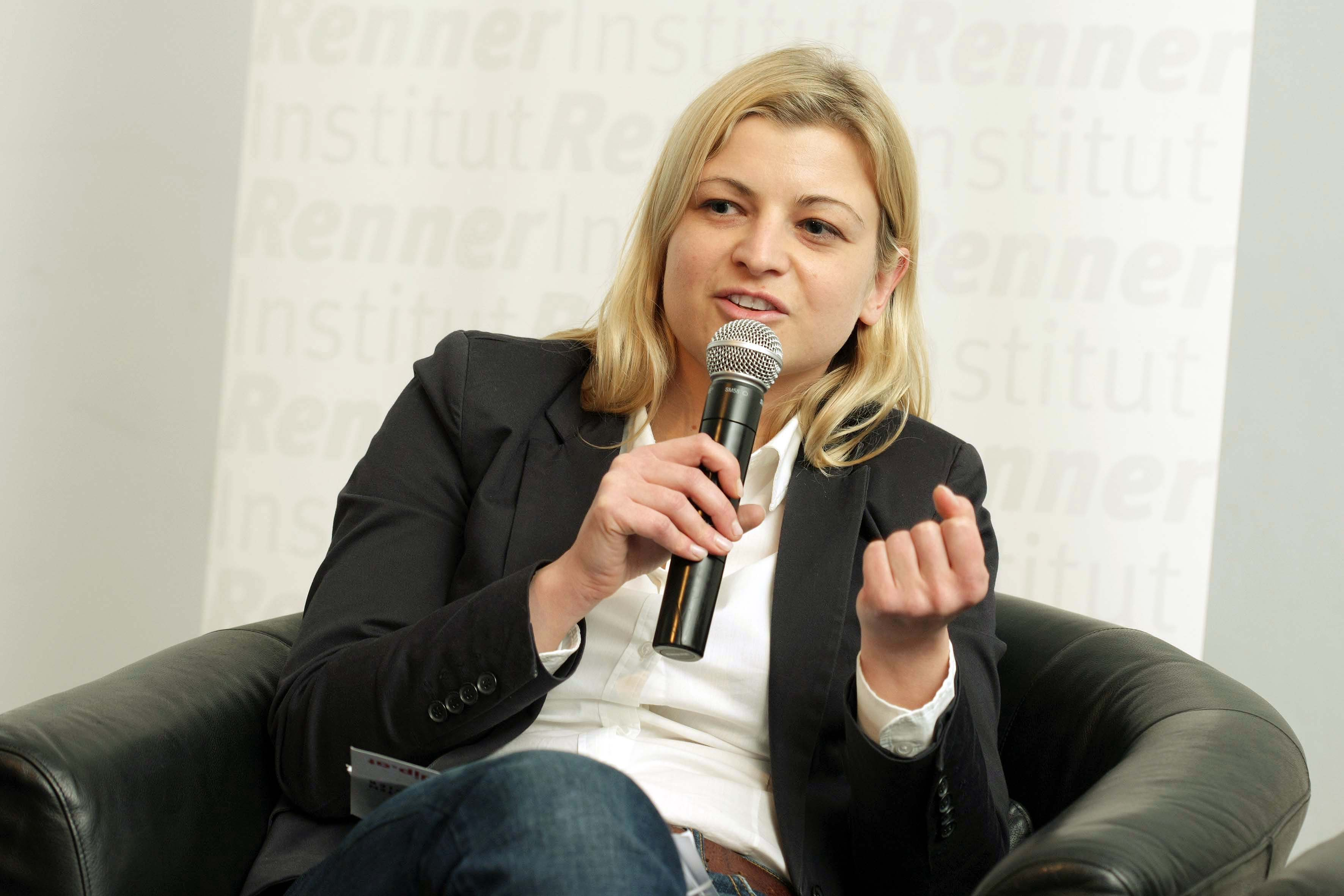
- Hattmannsdorfer in 2023

Member of the National Council
- Incumbent
- Assumed office 24 October 2024

Personal details
- Born: 5 August 1977 (age 49) Vienna, Austria
- Party: Social Democratic Party

Barbara Teiber (born 5 August 1977) is an Austrian trade unionist and politician of the Social Democratic Party. She was elected member of the National Council in the 2024 legislative election, and has served as chairwoman of the Union of Private Sector Employees, Printing, Journalism, and Paper since 2018.
