= Anton Benya =

Austrian politician (1912–2001)

Anton Benya (born 8 October 1912 in Vienna, died 5 December 2001) was an Austrian politician (with the Social Democratic Party of Austria) and trade unionist. He was President of the National Council from 1971 to 1986.

== Honours and awards ==
- Grand Decoration of Honour in Gold for Services to the Republic of Austria (1972)
- Commander's Cross with Star of Burgenland (1972)
- Grand Gold Medal with Star for Services to the City of Vienna (1972)
- Gold Medal of the French Senate (1972)
- Grand Cross of the Order of Merit of the Italian Republic (1972)
- Grand Cordon of the Order of Merit of the Republic of Poland (1974)
- Grand Cross of the Order of Merit of the Federal Republic of Germany (1975)
- Decoration for Services to the Liberation of Austria (1977)
- Honorary Citizen of the City of Vienna (1977)
- Grand Cross of the Order of the Dannebrog (Denmark, 1979)
- Grand Cross of the Order of Isabel the Catholic (Spain, 1979)
- Commander Grand Cross of the Order of the Polar Star (Sweden, 1980)
- Carinthian provincial Order in Gold (1982)
- Medal of the French President in silver (1982)
- Honorary Diploma of the City Council of Eisenerz (1983)
- Grand Cross of the Order of Christ (Portugal, 1984)
- Grand Cross of the Order of the White Rose of Finland (1985)
- Medal for service to the Parliament of the People's Republic of Poland (1986)
- Medal of Europe in silver
- Grand Cross of the National Order of Merit (France)
- Grand Cross of the Order of Honour (Greece)
- Medal for Merit in resistance against fascism (Czechoslovakia)
- Order of the Yugoslav Great Star
- Order of Tudor Vladimirescu, 1st class (Romania)
- Supreme Order of the Renaissance, 1st class (Jordan)
- Gold Medal of the Parliament of South Africa
- Order of the Golden Heart, 2nd class (Kenya)
- Ring of honor in Gold of the Mineworkers Federation of Bolivia
- Medal of the Greater London Council in Silver
- Medal from the Mayor of Vienna
- Honorary Medal of the Vienna University of Economics and Business

Trade union offices
Preceded by Franz Olah	President of the Austrian Trade Union Federation; 1963–1987	Succeeded by Fritz Verzetnitsch
