= Union of Municipal Employees =

The Union of Municipal Employees (German: Gewerkschaft der Gemeindebediensteten, GdG) was a trade union representing local authority workers in Austria.

The union was founded in 1945 by the Austrian Trade Union Federation. By 1998, it had 174,423 members, with 45% working in social services, 40% in public administration, and most of the remainder in utilities. In 2009, the union merged with the much smaller Union of Artists, Media Workers and Freelance Workers, to form the Union of Municipal Employees, Art, Media, Sport and Freelance Workers.

== Presidents ==
Johann Polzer

2006: Christian Meidlinger
