= Union of Private Sector Employees, Printing, Journalism, and Paper =

- Gewerkschaft der Privatangestellten, Druck, Journalismus, Papier

- Headquarters building
- Abbreviation: GPA
- Founded: January 1, 2007; 19 years ago
- Merger of: Union of Private Sector Employees & Union of Printing, Journalism, and Paper
- Type: Trade union
- Headquarters: Alfred-Dallinger-Platz 1 A-1030 Vienna
- Location: Austria
- Coordinates: 48.1942733°N 16.4030732°E
- Fields: Private sector & media industry
- Key people: Wolfgang Katzian & Barbara Teiber
- Affiliations: Austrian Trade Union Federation (OGB)
- Website: www.gpa.at

The Union of Private Sector Employees, Printing, Journalism, and Paper (German: Gewerkschaft der Privatangestellten, Druck, Journalismus, Papier, commonly abbreviated GPA or GPA-DJP) is the largest trade union in the Austrian Trade Union Federation. It represents the interests of Austrian private sector employees, graphics and paper industry employees, and journalists. It also represents apprentices, pupils, students, temporary and part-time employees, parental leave allowance recipients, and civil and military service providers.

The GPA-DJP organizes approximately 15,000 workers' councils, and with them negotiates on the order of 160 collective agreements per year across diverse economic sectors.

== History ==
Protest against 12-hour work days, 2018

The union was created on January 1, 2007, with the merger of the Union of Private Sector Employees (GPA), formerly Austria's largest trade union, with the Union of Printing, Journalism, and Paper (DJP), formerly Austria's oldest. The headquarters of the new union were established at the GPA's former headquarters, located on Alfred Dallinger Platz in Vienna's third district.

== Services ==
Members of the GPA benefit from the collective work of the GPA, are entitled to legal protection in all labor matters, receive financial benefits in emergency situations and advice on many issues relating to employment and labor law. They also enjoy the benefits of the GPA-DJP-Card, which entitles its bearer to discounts and special offers.

== Education program ==
The GPA-DJP education program is geared towards the needs of workers' councils, and aims to give council members the knowledge and skills to support their businesses successfully and efficiently for the benefit of employees.

Base skills and knowledge for newly elected council members are taught in basic and advanced regional courses. Courses intended to improve social skills, engender personal development, and strengthen negotiation ability are provided by the union's education department. Additional courses in anti-discrimination and collective contract design are available as well.

== Presidents ==
2007: Wolfgang Katzian
2018: Barbara Teiber
