= Union of Public Services =

Austrian trade union

- Gewerkschaft Öffentlicher Dienst

- Linz union hall
- Abbreviation: GÖD
- Established: 1945; 81 years ago
- Type: Trade union
- Headquarters: Teinfaltstraße 7, 1010 Vienna
- Location: Austria
- Coordinates: 48.2113166°N 16.3601748°E
- Fields: Public service & education workers
- Members: 267,804 (2026)
- Official language: Austrian German
- Affiliations: Austrian Trade Union Federation (OGB)
- Website: www.goed.at

The Union of Public Services (German: Gewerkschaft Öffentlicher Dienst, GÖD), is a trade union representing public service workers in Austria.

The union was founded in 1945 by the Austrian Trade Union Federation, and by 1998 it had 229,778 members. It was particularly strong in administration, with many teachers also holding membership.

== Presidents ==
1945: Franz Rubant
1948: Fritz Koubek
1968: Alfred Gasperschitz
1977: Rudolf Sommer
1989: Siegfried Dohr
1997: Fritz Neugebauer
2016: Norbert Schnedl
