= PRO-GE =

The Production Union
- Die Produktionsgewerkschaft

- Protest against 12-hour workday, 2018
- Abbreviation: PRO-GE
- Established: 2009; 17 years ago
- Merger of: Chemical Workers' Union & Metal-Textile-Food Union
- Type: Trade union
- Headquarters: Johann-Böhm-Platz 1/3. Stock, 1020 Vienna
- Location: Austria
- Coordinates: 48.2056883°N 16.4276235°E
- Origins: Blue-collar workers
- Members: 255,000 (2009)
- Official language: Austrian German
- Key people: Rainer Wimmer
- Affiliations: OGB, IUF, & IndustriALL
- Website: www.proge.at

The Production Union (German: Die Produktionsgewerkschaft, PRO-GE) is a trade union representing workers in manufacturing, agriculture and mining, in Austria.

The union was founded in November 2009, when the Chemical Workers' Union (GdC) merged with the Metal-Textile-Food Union (GMTN). On formation, the union had 255,000 members, and was the third largest affiliate of the Austrian Trade Union Federation. Rainer Wimmer, formerly of the GdC, was elected as the union's first president.

While the union recruits across the metal, mining, energy, textiles, leather, agriculture, food processing and tobacco sectors, it also recruits temporary workers in any sector. However, it only recruits blue collar workers, with managers and clerical staff being represented by other unions. The union is affiliated to the International Union of Food, Agricultural, Hotel, Restaurant, Catering, Tobacco and Allied Workers' Associations, and the IndustriALL Global Union.

== Presidents ==
2009: Rainer Wimmer
