= Innsbruck Rural (National Council electoral district) =

Parliamentary electoral district in Austria

- Innsbruck-Land
- Electoral District for the National Council
- Location of Innsbruck Rural within Austria
- District: List: Innsbruck Rural; Schwaz
- State: Tyrol
- Population: 273,295 (2024)
- Electorate: 193,217 (2019)
- Area: 3,833 km^{2} (2023)

Current Electoral District
- Created: 1994
- Seats: List: 6 (2024–present); 5 (1994–2024)
- Members: List: Hermann Gahr (ÖVP); Rebecca Kirchbaumer (ÖVP)

Innsbruck Rural (German: Innsbruck-Land), also known as Electoral District 7B (German: Wahlkreis 7B), is one of the 39 multi-member regional electoral districts of the National Council, the lower house of the Austrian Parliament, the national legislature of Austria. The electoral district was created in 1992 when electoral regulations were amended to add regional electoral districts to the existing state-wide electoral districts and came into being at the following legislative election in 1994. It consists of the districts of Innsbruck Rural and Schwaz in the state of Tyrol. The electoral district currently elects six of the 183 members of the National Council using the open party-list proportional representation electoral system. At the 2019 legislative election the constituency had 193,217 registered electors.

== History ==
Innsbruck Rural was one 43 regional electoral districts (regionalwahlkreise) established by the "National Council Electoral Regulations 1992" (Nationalrats-Wahlordnung 1992) passed by the National Council in 1992. It consisted of the districts of Innsbruck Rural and Schwaz in the state of Tyrol. The district was initially allocated five seats in May 1993. Electoral regulations require the allocation of seats amongst the electoral districts to be recalculated following each national census and in June 2023 the number of seats allocated to Innsbruck Rural was increased to six based on the population as at the 2021 national census.

== Electoral system ==
Innsbruck Rural currently elects six of the 183 members of the National Council using the open party-list proportional representation electoral system. The allocation of seats is carried out in three stages. In the first stage, seats are allocated to parties (lists) at the regional level using a state-wide Hare quota (wahlzahl) (valid votes in the state divided by the number of seats in the state). In the second stage, seats are allocated to parties at the state/provincial level using the state-wide Hare quota (any seats won by the party at the regional stage are subtracted from the party's state seats). In the third and final stage, seats are allocated to parties at the federal/national level using the D'Hondt method (any seats won by the party at the regional and state stages are subtracted from the party's federal seats). Only parties that reach the 4% national threshold, or have won a seat at the regional stage, compete for seats at the state and federal stages.

Electors may cast one preferential vote for individual candidates at the regional, state and federal levels. Split-ticket voting (panachage), or voting for more than one candidate at each level, is not permitted and will result in the ballot paper being invalidated. At the regional level, candidates must receive preferential votes amounting to at least 14% of the valid votes cast for their party to over-ride the order of the party list (10% and 7% respectively for the state and federal levels). Prior to April 2013 electors could not cast preferential votes at the federal level and the thresholds candidates needed to over-ride the party list order were higher at the regional level (half the Hare quota or 1/6 of the party votes) and state level (Hare quota).

== Election results ==
=== Summary ===
Election	Communists KPÖ+ / KPÖ			Social Democrats SPÖ			Greens GRÜNE			NEOS NEOS / LiF			People's ÖVP			Freedom FPÖ		
Election	Votes	%	Seats	Votes	%	Seats	Votes	%	Seats	Votes	%	Seats	Votes	%	Seats	Votes	%	Seats
2019	758	0.54%	0	18,862	13.51%	0	20,198	14.47%	0	12,822	9.18%	0	62,028	44.43%	2	21,771	15.59%	0
2017	790	0.53%	0	31,002	20.98%	1	6,185	4.19%	0	8,361	5.66%	0	54,927	37.18%	2	39,035	26.42%	1
2013	769	0.61%	0	23,377	18.50%	0	19,488	15.42%	0	6,249	4.94%	0	39,723	31.43%	1	24,918	19.72%	1
2008	636	0.49%	0	23,619	18.27%	0	14,118	10.92%	0	3,148	2.44%	0	38,821	30.03%	1	22,552	17.45%	0
2006	959	0.76%	0	30,350	24.15%	1	16,344	13.00%	0				53,380	42.47%	2	13,912	11.07%	0
2002	732	0.54%	0	33,850	25.14%	1	15,730	11.68%	0	2,221	1.65%	0	68,854	51.14%	2	13,264	9.85%	0
1999	334	0.27%	0	28,715	23.33%	1	12,444	10.11%	0	4,536	3.68%	0	38,216	31.04%	1	35,627	28.94%	1
1995	317	0.24%	0	35,472	27.35%	1	8,384	6.46%	0	8,219	6.34%	0	38,715	29.85%	1	36,597	28.22%	1
1994	200	0.17%	0	29,223	24.34%	1	11,893	9.91%	0	6,355	5.29%	0	41,687	34.72%	1	27,793	23.15%	1

=== Detailed ===
==== 2010s ====
===== 2019 =====
Results of the 2019 legislative election held on 29 September 2019:

Party		Votes per district			Total votes	%	Seats
Party		Inns- bruck Rural	Schwaz	Voting card	Total votes	%	Seats
Austrian People's Party	ÖVP	40,993	20,942	93	62,028	44.43%	2
Freedom Party of Austria	FPÖ	14,517	7,213	41	21,771	15.59%	0
The Greens – The Green Alternative	GRÜNE	15,466	4,603	129	20,198	14.47%	0
Social Democratic Party of Austria	SPÖ	13,430	5,377	55	18,862	13.51%	0
NEOS – The New Austria and Liberal Forum	NEOS	9,672	3,087	63	12,822	9.18%	0
JETZT	JETZT	1,729	611	19	2,359	1.69%	0
KPÖ Plus	KPÖ+	571	184	3	758	0.54%	0
Der Wandel	WANDL	358	150	5	513	0.37%	0
My Vote Counts!	GILT	205	83	4	292	0.21%	0
Valid Votes		96,941	42,250	412	139,603	100.00%	2
Rejected Votes		703	346	3	1,052	0.75%	
Total Polled		97,644	42,596	415	140,655	72.80%	
Registered Electors		132,217	61,000		193,217		
Turnout		73.85%	69.83%		72.80%		

The following candidates were elected:

- Personal mandates - Hermann Gahr (ÖVP), 11,759 votes.
- Party mandates - Rebecca Kirchbaumer (ÖVP), 2,327 votes.

===== 2017 =====
Results of the 2017 legislative election held on 15 October 2017:

Party		Votes per district			Total votes	%	Seats
Party		Inns- bruck Rural	Schwaz	Voting card	Total votes	%	Seats
Austrian People's Party	ÖVP	36,457	18,359	111	54,927	37.18%	2
Freedom Party of Austria	FPÖ	26,039	12,937	59	39,035	26.42%	1
Social Democratic Party of Austria	SPÖ	22,828	8,065	109	31,002	20.98%	1
NEOS – The New Austria and Liberal Forum	NEOS	6,187	2,118	56	8,361	5.66%	0
The Greens – The Green Alternative	GRÜNE	4,832	1,312	41	6,185	4.19%	0
Peter Pilz List	PILZ	4,306	1,373	49	5,728	3.88%	0
My Vote Counts!	GILT	821	306	2	1,129	0.76%	0
Communist Party of Austria	KPÖ	563	216	11	790	0.53%	0
The Whites	WEIßE	236	93	3	332	0.22%	0
Free List Austria	FLÖ	162	91	0	253	0.17%	0
Valid Votes		102,431	44,870	441	147,742	100.00%	4
Rejected Votes		701	422	6	1,129	0.76%	
Total Polled		103,132	45,292	447	148,871	77.67%	
Registered Electors		131,002	60,658		191,660		
Turnout		78.73%	74.67%		77.67%		

The following candidates were elected:

- Personal mandates - Hermann Gahr (ÖVP), 10,285 votes; and Peter Wurm (FPÖ), 5,828 votes.
- Party mandates - Rebecca Kirchbaumer (ÖVP), 1,293 votes; and Maximilian Unterrainer (SPÖ), 2,169 votes.

===== 2013 =====
Results of the 2013 legislative election held on 29 September 2013:

Party		Votes per district			Total votes	%	Seats
Party		Inns- bruck Rural	Schwaz	Voting card	Total votes	%	Seats
Austrian People's Party	ÖVP	26,206	13,460	57	39,723	31.43%	1
Freedom Party of Austria	FPÖ	16,839	8,050	29	24,918	19.72%	1
Social Democratic Party of Austria	SPÖ	16,226	7,111	40	23,377	18.50%	0
The Greens – The Green Alternative	GRÜNE	15,001	4,396	91	19,488	15.42%	0
Team Stronach	FRANK	4,645	2,546	8	7,199	5.70%	0
NEOS – The New Austria	NEOS	4,863	1,351	35	6,249	4.94%	0
Alliance for the Future of Austria	BZÖ	2,684	1,191	7	3,882	3.07%	0
Pirate Party of Austria	PIRAT	560	223	2	785	0.62%	0
Communist Party of Austria	KPÖ	599	168	2	769	0.61%	0
Valid Votes		87,623	38,496	271	126,390	100.00%	2
Rejected Votes		1,079	464	5	1,548	1.21%	
Total Polled		88,702	38,960	276	127,938	68.25%	
Registered Electors		127,916	59,549		187,465		
Turnout		69.34%	65.43%		68.25%		

The following candidates were elected:

- Personal mandates - Hermann Gahr (ÖVP), 9,711 votes; and Peter Wurm (FPÖ), 5,070 votes.

==== 2000s ====
===== 2008 =====
Results of the 2008 legislative election held on 28 September 2008:

Party		Votes per district			Total votes	%	Seats
Party		Inns- bruck Rural	Schwaz	Voting card	Total votes	%	Seats
Austrian People's Party	ÖVP	25,724	12,909	188	38,821	30.03%	1
Social Democratic Party of Austria	SPÖ	16,201	7,304	114	23,619	18.27%	0
Freedom Party of Austria	FPÖ	15,709	6,756	87	22,552	17.45%	0
The Greens – The Green Alternative	GRÜNE	10,841	3,080	197	14,118	10.92%	0
Fritz Dinkhauser List – Citizens' Forum Tyrol	FRITZ	8,780	3,616	62	12,458	9.64%	0
Alliance for the Future of Austria	BZÖ	7,991	4,106	59	12,156	9.40%	0
Liberal Forum	LiF	2,475	624	49	3,148	2.44%	0
The Christians	DC	618	268	7	893	0.69%	0
Independent Citizens' Initiative Save Austria	RETTÖ	507	259	2	768	0.59%	0
Communist Party of Austria	KPÖ	429	204	3	636	0.49%	0
Left	LINKE	65	31	0	96	0.07%	0
Valid Votes		89,340	39,157	768	129,265	100.00%	1
Rejected Votes		1,146	534	16	1,696	1.30%	
Total Polled		90,486	39,691	784	130,961	71.97%	
Registered Electors		123,828	58,148		181,976		
Turnout		73.07%	68.26%		71.97%		

The following candidates were elected:

- Personal mandates - Hermann Gahr (ÖVP), 7,591 votes.

===== 2006 =====
Results of the 2006 legislative election held on 1 October 2006:

Party		Votes per district			Total votes	%	Seats
Party		Inns- bruck Rural	Schwaz	Voting card	Total votes	%	Seats
Austrian People's Party	ÖVP	34,033	17,345	2,002	53,380	42.47%	2
Social Democratic Party of Austria	SPÖ	20,270	9,146	934	30,350	24.15%	1
The Greens – The Green Alternative	GRÜNE	11,701	3,482	1,161	16,344	13.00%	0
Freedom Party of Austria	FPÖ	9,399	4,205	308	13,912	11.07%	0
Hans-Peter Martin's List	MATIN	3,820	1,426	155	5,401	4.30%	0
Alliance for the Future of Austria	BZÖ	2,624	1,152	83	3,859	3.07%	0
EU Withdrawal – Neutral Free Austria	NFÖ	1,097	344	36	1,477	1.18%	0
Communist Party of Austria	KPÖ	658	268	33	959	0.76%	0
Valid Votes		83,602	37,368	4,712	125,682	100.00%	3
Rejected Votes		1,056	584	29	1,669	1.31%	
Total Polled		84,658	37,952	4,741	127,351	73.53%	
Registered Electors		117,691	55,499		173,190		
Turnout		71.93%	68.38%		73.53%		

The following candidates were elected:

- Personal mandates - Hermann Gahr (ÖVP), 6,084 votes.
- Party mandates - Maria Grander (ÖVP), 3,091 votes; and Erwin Niederwieser (SPÖ), 4,105 votes.

===== 2002 =====
Results of the 2002 legislative election held on 24 November 2002:

Party		Votes per district			Total votes	%	Seats
Party		Inns- bruck Rural	Schwaz	Voting card	Total votes	%	Seats
Austrian People's Party	ÖVP	44,581	21,889	2,384	68,854	51.14%	2
Social Democratic Party of Austria	SPÖ	22,787	10,268	795	33,850	25.14%	1
The Greens – The Green Alternative	GRÜNE	11,061	3,535	1,134	15,730	11.68%	0
Freedom Party of Austria	FPÖ	8,527	4,413	324	13,264	9.85%	0
Liberal Forum	LiF	1,496	649	76	2,221	1.65%	0
Communist Party of Austria	KPÖ	474	244	14	732	0.54%	0
Valid Votes		88,926	40,998	4,727	134,651	100.00%	3
Rejected Votes		1,232	706	20	1,958	1.43%	
Total Polled		90,158	41,704	4,747	136,609	83.62%	
Registered Electors		110,618	52,748		163,366		
Turnout		81.50%	79.06%		83.62%		

The following candidates were elected:

- Personal mandates - Hermann Gahr (ÖVP), 11,591 votes.
- Party mandates - Maria Grander (ÖVP), 2,004 votes; and Erwin Niederwieser (SPÖ), 4,253 votes.

==== 1990s ====
===== 1999 =====
Results of the 1999 legislative election held on 3 October 1999:

Party		Votes per district			Total votes	%	Seats
Party		Inns- bruck Rural	Schwaz	Voting card	Total votes	%	Seats
Austrian People's Party	ÖVP	25,018	11,836	1,362	38,216	31.04%	1
Freedom Party of Austria	FPÖ	23,291	11,393	943	35,627	28.94%	1
Social Democratic Party of Austria	SPÖ	19,028	8,817	870	28,715	23.33%	1
The Greens – The Green Alternative	GRÜNE	8,592	3,068	784	12,444	10.11%	0
Liberal Forum	LiF	3,259	941	336	4,536	3.68%	0
The Independents	DU	1,234	713	51	1,998	1.62%	0
No to NATO and EU – Neutral Austria Citizens' Initiative	NEIN	415	220	15	650	0.53%	0
Christian Voters Community	CWG	430	112	38	580	0.47%	0
Communist Party of Austria	KPÖ	231	94	9	334	0.27%	0
Valid Votes		81,498	37,194	4,408	123,100	100.00%	3
Rejected Votes		1,180	710	29	1,919	1.53%	
Total Polled		82,678	37,904	4,437	125,019	78.90%	
Registered Electors		107,218	51,232		158,450		
Turnout		77.11%	73.99%		78.90%		

The following candidates were elected:

- Party mandates - Hermann Gahr (ÖVP), 5,446 votes; Erwin Niederwieser (SPÖ), 3,179 votes; and Susanne Riess (FPÖ), 5,772 votes.

Substitutions:

- Susanne Riess (FPÖ) resigned on 10 February 2000 and was replaced by Bernd Brugger (FPÖ) on 14 February 2000.

===== 1995 =====
Results of the 1995 legislative election held on 17 December 1995:

Party		Votes per district			Total votes	%	Seats
Party		Inns- bruck Rural	Schwaz	Voting card	Total votes	%	Seats
Austrian People's Party	ÖVP	25,712	12,136	867	38,715	29.85%	1
Freedom Party of Austria	FPÖ	23,513	12,519	565	36,597	28.22%	1
Social Democratic Party of Austria	SPÖ	23,882	10,980	610	35,472	27.35%	1
The Greens – The Green Alternative	GRÜNE	5,791	2,176	417	8,384	6.46%	0
Liberal Forum	LiF	5,841	1,993	385	8,219	6.34%	0
No – Civic Action Group; Against the Sale of Austria	NEIN	1,360	604	36	2,000	1.54%	0
Communist Party of Austria	KPÖ	198	116	3	317	0.24%	0
Valid Votes		86,297	40,524	2,883	129,704	100.00%	3
Rejected Votes		2,501	1,395	35	3,931	2.94%	
Total Polled		88,798	41,919	2,918	133,635	87.94%	
Registered Electors		102,425	49,533		151,958		
Turnout		86.70%	84.63%		87.94%		

The following candidates were elected:

- Party mandates - Dieter Lukesch (ÖVP), 1,879 votes; Walter Meischberger (FPÖ), 4,448 votes; and Erwin Niederwieser (SPÖ), 3,036 votes.

Substitutions:

- Walter Meischberger (FPÖ) resigned on 23 February 1999 and was replaced by Wilfried Tilg (FPÖ) on 24 February 1999.
- Wilfried Tilg (FPÖ) resigned on 2 April 1999 and was replaced by Walter Meischberger (FPÖ) on 20 April 1999.
- Walter Meischberger (FPÖ) resigned on 22 April 1999 and was replaced by Anton Blünegger (FPÖ) on 26 April 1999.

===== 1994 =====
Results of the 1994 legislative election held on 9 October 1994:

Party		Votes per district			Total votes	%	Seats
Party		Inns- bruck Rural	Schwaz	Voting card	Total votes	%	Seats
Austrian People's Party	ÖVP	26,917	13,518	1,252	41,687	34.72%	1
Social Democratic Party of Austria	SPÖ	18,892	9,590	741	29,223	24.34%	1
Freedom Party of Austria	FPÖ	18,083	8,971	739	27,793	23.15%	1
The Greens – The Green Alternative	GRÜNE	8,191	2,992	710	11,893	9.91%	0
Liberal Forum	LiF	4,585	1,392	378	6,355	5.29%	0
No – Civic Action Group; Against the Sale of Austria	NEIN	910	472	31	1,413	1.18%	0
Christian Voters Community	CWG	756	215	33	1,004	0.84%	0
Natural Law Party	ÖNP	230	74	10	314	0.26%	0
Communist Party of Austria	KPÖ	143	55	2	200	0.17%	0
United Greens Austria – List Adi Pinter	VGÖ	112	44	12	168	0.14%	0
Valid Votes		78,819	37,323	3,908	120,050	100.00%	3
Rejected Votes		2,045	1,335	51	3,431	2.78%	
Total Polled		80,864	38,658	3,959	123,481	82.01%	
Registered Electors		101,391	49,184		150,575		
Turnout		79.75%	78.60%		82.01%		

The following candidates were elected:

- Personal mandates - Franz Fischler (ÖVP), 11,600 votes.
- Party mandates - Walter Meischberger (FPÖ), 4,184 votes; and Erwin Niederwieser (SPÖ), 2,761 votes.

Substitutions:

- Franz Fischler (ÖVP) resigned on 28 November 1994 and was replaced by Dieter Lukesch (ÖVP) on 29 November 1994.
