= Union of Printing, Journalism, and Paper =

Austrian trade union

DJP
- Union of Printing, Journalism, and Paper
- Gewerkschaft Druck, Journalismus, Papier
- Merged into: GPA-DJP
- Founded: 1842
- Dissolved: January 1, 2007
- Location: Austria

The Union of Printing, Journalism, and Paper (German: Gewerkschaft Druck, Journalismus, Papier, commonly abbreviated DJP) was an Austrian trade union.

== History ==
The Printer's Union began in 1842 with the establishment of the Association for the Support of Sick Printers and Type designers in Vienna (German: Unterstützungsvereins für erkrankte Buchdrucker und Schriftgießer in Wien). The union was banned in the 1930s, but was re-established by the Austrian Trade Union Federation in 1945. By 1998, it had 18,023 members.

The union merged with the Union of Private Sector Employees in 2007 to become the GPA-DJP, the nation's largest union. At that time of its dissolution it was the oldest trade union in Austria.

== Presidents ==
1945: Adolf Weigelt
1977: Herbert Bruna
1993: Franz Bittner
