= Austrian Trade Union Federation =

Trade union

- Österreichischer Gewerkschaftsbund

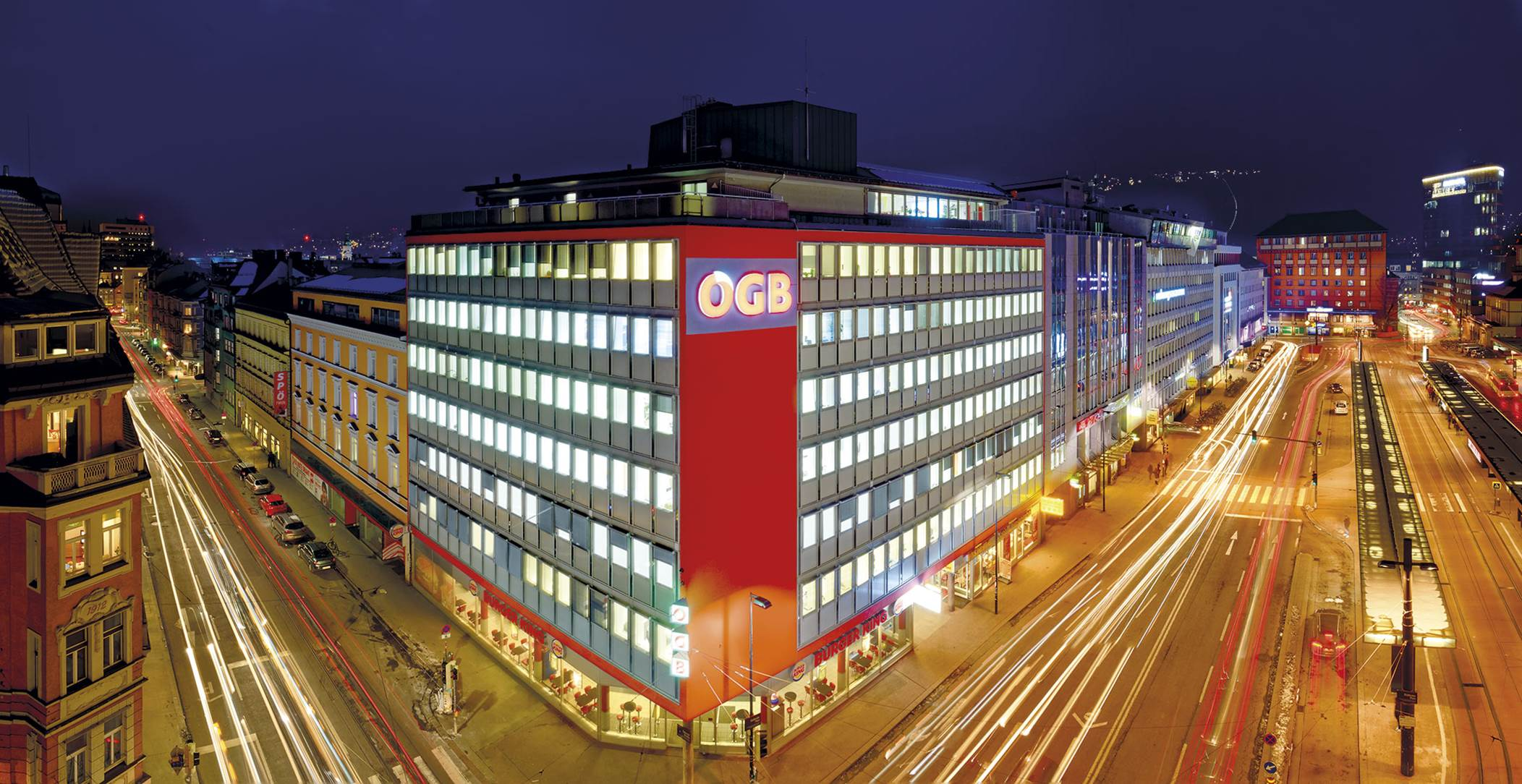
- Abbreviation: ÖGB, OeGB
- Founded: 1945; 81 years ago
- Headquarters: Vienna, Austria
- Location: Austria
- Members: 1,335,421 (2005)
- Key people: Wolfgang Katzian, president
- Affiliations: ITUC, TUAC
- Website: www.oegb.at

The Austrian Trade Union Federation or Austrian Federation of Trade Unions (German: Österreichischer Gewerkschaftsbund, abbreviated OeGB or ÖGB) is a labour union of employees. It is constituted as an association and is subdivided into seven smaller affiliated trade unions. Each union is traditionally dominated by a certain Political faction, with the strongest faction in the ÖGB as a whole traditionally being the social democratic one (Fraktion Sozialdemokratischer GewerkschafterInnen), which is known for its close contacts to Austria's Social Democratic Party (SPÖ); chairmen of the ÖGB have often also been influential SPÖ members.

== Affiliated unions ==
- PRO-GE
- Union of Construction and Woodworkers (GBH)
- Union of Postal and Telecommunications Workers (GPF)
- Union of Private Sector Employees, Printing, Journalism, and Paper (GPA-DJP)
- Union of Public Services (GÖD)
- Vida
- Younion

== Former affiliates ==
Union	Acronym	Founded	Fate	Year
Chemical Workers' Union	GdC	1945	Merged into PRO-GE	2009
Commerce and Transport Union	HTV	1945	Merged into vida	2006
Hotel, Catering and Personal Services Union	HGPD	1978	Merged into vida	2006
Hotel and Restaurant Workers' Union	GGA	1945	Merged into HGPD	1978
Metal-Textile-Food Union	GMTN	2006	Merged into PRO-GE	2009
Metal-Textile Union	GMT	2000	Merged into GMTN	2006
Personal Service Workers' Union	GPD	1945	Merged into HGPD	1978
Railway Workers' Union	GdE	1945	Merged into vida	2006
Union of Agricultural and Forestry Workers	GLFG	1945	Merged into ANG	1991
Union of Agriculture, Food and Allied Industries	ANG	1991	Merged into GMTN	2006
Union of Artists, Media Workers and Freelance Workers	GKMF	1945	Merged into younion	2009
Union of Metal, Mining and Energy	GMBE	1945	Merged into GMT	2000
Union of Municipal Employees	GGB	1945	Merged into younion	2009
Union of Printing, Journalism, and Paper	DJP	1945	Merged into GPA-DJP	2007
Union of Private Sector Employees	GPA	1945	Merged into GPA-DJP	2007
Union of Workers in Food and Allied Industries	GLB	1945	Merged into ANG	1991
Union of Textile, Clothing and Leather Workers	GTBL	1945	Merged into GMT	2000

== Presidents ==
1945: Johann Böhm
1959: Franz Olah
1963: Anton Benya
1987: Fritz Verzetnitsch
2006: Rudolf Hundstorfer (acting)
2008: Erich Foglar
2018: Wolfgang Katzian
