= List of trade unions =

This is a list of trade unions and union federations by country.

== International federations ==
=== Global ===
- Industrial Workers of the World
- International Confederation of Labor
- International Trade Union Confederation
- International Workers Association
- World Federation of Trade Unions
- World Organization of Workers

=== Sectoral global union federations ===
- Building and Wood Workers' International
- Education International
- FIFPro
- IndustriALL Global Union
- International Affiliation of Writers Guilds
- International Arts and Entertainment Alliance
- International Domestic Workers Federation
- International Federation of Actors
- International Federation of Air Line Pilots' Associations
- International Federation of Journalists
- International Federation of Musicians
- International Transport Workers' Federation
- International Union of Food, Agricultural, Hotel, Restaurant, Catering, Tobacco and Allied Workers' Associations
- Public Services International
- Trade Union International of Agricultural, Forestry and Plantation Workers
- UNI Global Union

=== European federations ===
- List of federations of trade unions in Europe

== Afghanistan ==
- All Afghanistan Federation of Trade Unions
- All Afghanistan Women's Union
- Afghan Labour Organisation
- Afghanistan Federation of Trade Unions
- Afghanistan International Journalists' Association
- Afghanistan Lawyers' Union
- Afghanistan National Powerful Workers' Union
- Afghanistan Teachers' Association
- Afghanistan Teachers' Support Association
- Central Council of Afghan Trade Unions
- Central Council of National Unions of Afghanistan Employees
- National Journalists' Union
- National Workers' Union of Afghanistan

== Albania ==
- Confederation of Trade Unions
- United Independent Albanian Trade Unions

== Algeria ==
- General Union of Algerian Workers
- Union générale des syndicats algériens

== Andorra ==
- Andorran Workers' Union

== Angola ==
- General Centre of Independent and Free Unions of Angola
- Independent Union of Maritime and Related Workers
- National Union of Angolan Workers

== Antigua and Barbuda ==
- Antigua and Barbuda Public Service Association
- Antigua Trades and Labour Union
- Antigua Workers' Union
- Leeward Islands Airline Pilots Association

== Argentina ==
- Argentine Workers' Center
- Consejo Coordinador Argentino Sindical
- Federación Agraria Argentina
- Federación Obrera Regional Argentina
- General Confederation of Labour

== Armenia ==
- Confederation of Trade Unions of Armenia

== Aruba ==
- Aruban Workers' Federation

== Australia ==
- AFL Players Association
- Australasian Meat Industry Employees Union
- Australian and International Pilots Association
- Australian Council of Trade Unions
- Australian Federation of Air Pilots
- Australian Institute of Marine and Power Engineers
- Australian Manufacturing Workers Union
- Australian Maritime Officers Union
- Australian Nursing and Midwifery Federation
- Australian Rail Tram and Bus Industry Union
- Australian Salaried Medical Officers' Federation
- Australian Services Union
- Australian Workers Union
- Civil Air Operations Officers' Association of Australia
- Communications Electrical and Plumbing Union
- Community and Public Sector Union
- Construction, Forestry, Maritime, Mining and Energy Union
- Electrical Trades Union
- Finance Sector Union
- Flight Attendants Association of Australia
- Health Services Union
- Industrial Workers of the World
- Media Entertainment and Arts Alliance
- Musicians' Union of Australia
- National Tertiary Education Union
- Police Federation of Australia
- Professionals Australia
- Shop, Distributive and Allied Employees Association
- Transport Workers Union of Australia
- United Firefighters Union of Australia
- United Workers Union

== Austria ==
- Austrian Trade Union Federation
- Industrial Workers of the World
- Viennese Workers Syndicate

== Azerbaijan ==
- Azerbaijan Trade Unions Confederation
- Committee for Oil Industry Workers' Rights
- Journalists Trade Union of Azerbaijan

== Bahamas ==
- Bahamas Airline Pilots Association
- Bahamas Hotel, Catering and Allied Workers Union
- Bahamas Taxi Cab Union
- Bahamas Union of Teachers
- Commonwealth of the Bahamas Trade Union Congress

== Bahrain ==
- General Federation of Workers Trade Unions in Bahrain

== Bangladesh ==
- Bangladesh Administrative Service Association
- Bangladesh Civil Service (Taxation) Association
- Bangladesh Federal Union of Journalists
- Bangladesh Free Trade Union Congress
- Bangladesh Ganotantrik Sramik Federation
- Bangladesh Garment Workers Trade Union Centre
- Bangladesh Independent Garment Workers Union Federation
- Bangladesh Jatio Sramik League
- Bangladesh Jatiyo Sramik Jote
- Bangladesh Jatyatabadi Sramik Dal
- Bangladesh Labour Federation
- Bangladesh Road Transport Workers Federation
- Bangladesh Sanjukta Sramik Federation
- Bangladesh Trade Union Kendra
- Dhaka Union of Journalists
- Garment Workers Unity Forum
- Jatio Sramik Federation
- Jatyo Sramik League
- Lal Bahini
- National Garment Workers Federation
- Samajtantrik Sramik Front

== Barbados ==
- Barbados Workers' Union
- Congress of Trade Unions and Staff Associations of Barbados
- Leeward Islands Airline Pilots Association
- National Union of Public Workers
- Unity Workers Union

== Belarus ==
- Trade unions in Belarus
  - Belarus Free Trade Union
  - Belarusian Congress of Democratic Trade Unions
  - Federation of Trade Unions of Belarus

== Belgium ==
- Confederation of Christian Trade Unions
- General Confederation of Liberal Trade Unions of Belgium
- General Federation of Belgian Labour

== Belize ==
- Christian Workers' Union
- General Workers' Union
- National Trade Union Congress of Belize
- United General Workers Union

== Benin ==
- Autonomous Trade Unions Centre
- General Confederation of the Workers of Benin
- National Union of the Unions of the Workers of Benin

== Bermuda ==
- Bermuda Industrial Union
- Bermuda Public Services Association

== Bhutan ==
- Federation of Bhutanese Trade Unions

== Bolivia ==
- Bolivian Workers' Center
- Confederación Sindical Única de Trabajadores Campesinos de Bolivia
- Corriente de Renovación Independiente y Solidaridad Laboral
- Federación Sindical de Trabajadores Mineros de Bolivia
- Local Workers' Federation
- National Federation of Domestic Workers of Bolivia
- Women Workers' Federation

== Bosnia and Herzegovina ==
- Confederation of Independent Trade Unions of Bosnia and Herzegovina
- Confederation of Trade Unions of the Republika Srpska

== Botswana ==
- Botswana Federation of Trade Unions
  - Air Botswana Employees' Union
  - Botswana Agricultural Marketing Board Workers' Union
  - Botswana Bank Employees' Union
  - Botswana Beverages & Allied Workers' Union
  - Botswana Central Bank Staff Union
  - Botswana Commercial & General Workers' Union
  - Botswana Construction Workers' Union
  - Botswana Diamond Sorters & Valuators' Union
  - Botswana Hotel Travel & Tourism Workers' Union
  - Botswana Housing Corporation Staff Union
  - Botswana Institute of Development Management Workers' Union
  - Botswana Manufacturing & Packaging Workers' Union
  - Botswana Meat Industry Workers' Union
  - Botswana Mining Workers' Union
  - Botswana National Development Bank Staff Union
  - Botswana Postal Services Workers' Union
  - Botswana Power Corporation Workers' Union
  - Botswana Private Medical & Health Services Workers' Union
  - Botswana Railways Amalgamated Workers' Union
  - Botswana Saving Bank Employees' Union
  - Botswana Telecommunication Employees' Union
  - Botswana Vaccine Institute Staff Union
  - Botswana Wholesale, Furniture & Retail Workers' Union
  - National Amalgamated Central, Local & Parastatal Manual Workers' Union
  - Rural Industry Promotions Company Workers' Union
  - University of Botswana Non-Academic Staff Union

== Brazil ==
- Central Autônoma de Trabalhadores
- Central Única dos Trabalhadores
- Confederação Brasileira de Trabalhadores Cristâos
- Confederação Geral dos Trabalhadores
- Confederação Operária Brasileira
- CSP-Conlutas
- Força Sindical
- Federação das Organizações Sindicalistas Revolucionárias do Brasil

== Bulgaria ==
- Confederation of Independent Trade Unions of Bulgaria
- Confederation of Labour Podkrepa
- National Trade Union Promyana

== Burkina Faso ==
- National Confederation of Workers of Burkina
- National Organisations of Free Trade Unions
- Trade Union Confederation of Burkina

== Burundi ==
- Confederation of Trade Unions of Burundi (Confédération des Syndicats du Burundi, COSYBU)
- Trade Union Confederation of Burundi (Confédération syndicale du Burundi, CSB)

== Cambodia ==
- Free Trade Union of Workers of the Kingdom of Cambodia

== Cameroon ==
- Confederation of Cameroon Trade Unions
- General Confederation of Free Workers of Cameroon
- Union of Free Trade Unions of Cameroon

== Canada ==
- Canadian Labour Congress
  - National affiliates
    - Alliance of Canadian Cinema, Television and Radio Artists
    - British Columbia Teachers' Federation
    - Canadian Association of University Teachers
    - Canadian Federation of Nurses' Union
    - Canadian Office and Professional Employees Union
    - Canadian Postmasters and Assistants Association
    - Canadian Union of Postal Workers
    - Canadian Union of Public Employees
    - Elementary Teachers' Federation of Ontario
    - National Union of Public and General Employees
    - Ontario English Catholic Teachers' Association
    - Ontario Secondary School Teachers' Federation
    - Professional Institute of the Public Service of Canada
    - Public Service Alliance of Canada
    - Telecommunications Workers Union
    - Unifor (formerly CAW and CEP)
  - International affiliates
    - Air Line Pilots Association, International
    - Amalgamated Transit Union
    - American Federation of Musicians
    - Bakery, Confectionery, Tobacco Workers and Grain Millers' International Union
    - CWA-Canadian Media Guild
    - International Alliance of Theatrical Stage Employees, Moving Picture Technicians, Artists and Allied Crafts of the United States, its Territories and Canada
    - International Association of Bridge, Structural, Ornamental and Reinforcing Iron Workers
    - International Association of Fire Fighters
    - International Association of Heat and Frost Insulators and Asbestos Workers
    - International Association of Machinists and Aerospace Workers
    - International Brotherhood of Boilermakers, Iron Ship Builders, Blacksmiths, Forgers and Helpers
    - International Brotherhood of Electrical Workers
    - International Federation of Professional and Technical Engineers
    - International Longshore and Warehouse Union
    - International Longshoremen's Association
    - International Union of Bricklayers and Allied Craftworkers
    - International Union of Elevator Constructors
    - International Union of Operating Engineers
    - International Union of Painters and Allied Trades
    - Operative Plasterers' and Cement Masons' International Association
    - Seafarers' International Union of Canada
    - Service Employees International Union
    - Sheet Metal Workers International Association
    - Teamsters
  - UNITE HERE
    - United Association of Journeymen and Apprentices of the Plumbing and Pipe Fitting Industry
    - United Auto Workers
    - United Brotherhood of Carpenters and Joiners of America
    - United Food and Commercial Workers Union
    - United Mine Workers of America
    - United Steelworkers
    - United Transportation Union
- Independent unions/other affiliations
  - Alliance des professeures et professeurs de Montréal
  - Canadian Actors' Equity Association
  - Centrale des syndicats du Québec
  - Confédération des syndicats nationaux
  - Congress of Democratic Trade Unions (Quebec)
  - Industrial Workers of the World
  - Major League Baseball Players Association
  - Manitoba Teachers' Society
  - National Hockey League Players' Association
  - Professional Association of Foreign Service Officers
  - Writers Guild of Canada
- Company unions
  - Christian Labour Association of Canada *

== Cape Verde ==
- Council of Free Labour Unions
- Trade Unions of Cape Verde Unity Centre

== Caribbean ==
- Caribbean Congress of Labour
- Caribbean Public Services Association
- Caribbean Union of Teachers

== Cayman Islands ==
- Cayman Airline Pilots Association

== Central African Republic ==
- Confédération Syndicale des Travailleurs de Centrafrique
- National Confederation of Central African Workers
- Union of Central African Workers

== Chad ==
- Free Confederation of Chadian Workers
- Union of Trade Unions of Chad

== Chile ==
- Central Autónoma de Trabajadores
- General Confederation of Workers
- Industrial Workers of the World
- Regional Workers' Federation of Chile
- Workers' Federation of Chile
- Workers' United Center of Chile

== People's Republic of China ==
- All-China Federation of Trade Unions
  - All-China Federation of Railway Workers' Unions
  - National Committee of the Chinese Agricultural, Forestry and Water Conservancy Workers' Union
  - National Committee of the Chinese Aviation Workers' Union
  - National Committee of the Chinese Banking Workers' Union
  - National Committee of the Chinese Defense Industry, Postal and Telecommunications Workers' Union
  - National Committee of the Chinese Educational, Scientific, Cultural, Medical and Sports Workers' Union
  - National Committee of the Chinese Energy and Chemical Workers' Union
  - National Committee of the Chinese Financial, Commercial, Light Industry, Textile and Tobacco Workers' Union
  - National Committee of the Chinese Machinery, Metallurgical and Building Material Workers' Union
  - National Committee of the Chinese Seamen and Construction Workers' Union

== Colombia ==
- Central Union of Workers
- Confederation of Workers of Colombia
- General Confederation of Democratic Workers
- SINALTRAINAL

== Commonwealth of Independent States ==
- General Confederation of Trade Unions

== Democratic Republic of the Congo ==
- Confédération Générale du Travail du Congo
- Democratic Confederation of Labour
- National Union of Congolese Workers

== Republic of the Congo ==
- Confédération des Syndicats Libres Autonomes du Congo
- Confédération Syndicale des Travailleurs du Congo
- Confédération Syndicale du Congo
- Congolese Trade Union Confederation

== Costa Rica ==
- Central de Trabajadores de Costa Rica
- Central del Movimiento de Trabajadores Costarricenses
- Confederación de Trabajadores de Costa Rica
- Confederación Unitaria de Trabajadores
- Costa Rican Confederation of Workers

== Croatia ==
- Association of Croatian Public Sector Unions
- Croatian Trade Union Association
- Independent Trade Unions of Croatia
- Union of Autonomous Trade Unions of Croatia
- Workers' Trade Union Association of Croatia

== Cuba ==
- Confederación General del Trabajo
- Cuban Workers' Solidarity
- Workers' Central Union of Cuba

== Cyprus ==
- Cyprus Turkish Unions Federation
- Cyprus Union of Bank Employees
- Cyprus Workers' Confederation
- Democratic Labour Federation of Cyprus
- Pancyprian Federation of Labour
- Pancyprian Public Servants' Trade Union
- Revolutionary Trade Unions Federation

== Czech Republic ==
- Christian Labour Confederation
- Czech-Moravian Confederation of Trade Unions

== Denmark ==
- Danish Confederation of Professional Associations
  - Danish Association of Chartered Surveyors
  - Danish Medical Association
  - Danish Union of Architects
  - Danish Union of Librarians
  - Danish Union of Journalists
- Danish Confederation of Trade Unions (LO)
  - Danish Food and Allied Workers' Union
  - Danish Timber Industry and Construction Workers' Union
  - Danish Union of Metalworkers
  - Danish Union of Professional Technicians
  - Danish Union of Public Employees
  - Fagligt Fælles Forbund
  - National Union of Commercial and Clerical Employees
- FTF – Confederation of Professionals in Denmark
  - Danish Association of Pharmaconomists
  - Danish Nurses Organisation
  - Danish Union of Teachers
- Trade Union Opposition Federation

== Djibouti ==
- General Union of Djibouti Workers
- Union of Djibouti Workers

== Dominica ==
- Dominica Amalgamated Workers' Union
- Dominica Public Service Union
- National Workers' Union
- Waterfront and Allied Workers' Union

== Dominican Republic ==
- Central General de Trabajadores
- Confederación de Trabajadores Unitaria

== Ecuador ==
- Confederación de Trabajadores del Ecuador
- Confederación Ecuatoriana de Organizaciones Clasistas Unitarias de Trabajadores
- Ecuador Confederation of Free Trade Union Organizations
- Frente Unitario de los Trabajadores

== Egypt ==
- Egyptian Trade Union Federation

== El Salvador ==
- Central Autónoma de Trabajadores Salvadoreños
- Central de Trabajadores Democráticos
- Federación Nacional Sindical de Trabajadores Salvadoreños

== Equatorial Guinea ==
- Equatorial Guinea Workers' Union

== Eritrea ==
- National Confederation of Eritrean Workers

== Estonia ==
- Confederation of Estonian Trade Unions
- Estonian Employees' Unions' Confederation

== Ethiopia ==
- Commercial Bank of Ethiopia Trade Union
- Confederation of Ethiopian Trade Unions
- Ethiopian Teachers' Association

== Fiji ==
- Federation of Cane Growers
- Fiji Islands Council of Trade Unions
- Fiji Trades Union Congress
- Indian Cane Growers Association
- Kisan Sangh
- Labasa Kisan Sangh
- Maha Sangh
- National Farmers Union of Fiji
- Rewa Planters Union
- Vishal Sangh

== Finland ==
The three major confederations:

- Central Organisation of Finnish Trade Unions
- Confederation of Unions for Academic Professionals in Finland AKAVA
- Finnish Confederation of Salaried Employees STTK

Individual trade unions

- Association of Employees in Government Educational Administration
- Finnish Association of Architects
- Finnish Association of Graduate Engineers
- Finnish Union of Practical Nurses
- Union of Health and Social Care Services
- Union of Salaried Employees

== France ==
=== Major confederations ===
- Confédération Française Démocratique du Travail
- Confédération Française de l'Encadrement - Confédération Générale des Cadres
- Confédération Française des Travailleurs Chrétiens
- Confédération Générale du Travail
- Force Ouvrière

=== Other important unions ===
- Fédération Syndicale Unitaire
- Solidaire
- Union Nationale des Syndicats Autonomes

== Gabon ==
- Gabonese Confederation of Free Trade Unions
- Gabonese Trade Union Confederation

== The Gambia ==
- The Gambia Press Union
- Gambia Workers' Union
- Gambian Workers' Confederation

== Georgia ==
- Georgian Trade Union Confederation

== Germany ==
=== Major confederations ===
- Christlicher Gewerkschaftsbund (CGB) German Christian Workers' Federation
- Deutscher Beamtenbund (dbb) German Civil Service Federation
  - komba gewerkschaft
- Deutscher Gewerkschaftsbund (DGB) German Confederation of Trade Unions
  - Eisenbahn- und Verkehrsgewerkschaft
  - Gewerkschaft Erziehung und Wissenschaft
  - Gewerkschaft Nahrung-Genuss-Gaststätten
  - IG Bauen-Agrar-Umwelt
  - IG Bergbau, Chemie, Energie
  - IG Metall
  - Trade Union of the Police
  - ver.di

=== Independent unions ===
- Free Workers' Union
- Gewerkschaft Deutscher Lokomotivführer
- Vereinigung Cockpit

== Ghana ==
- Ghana Federation of Labour
- Trades Union Congress of Ghana

== Gibraltar ==
- CITIPEG

=== Historical unions ===
- Gibraltar Apprentices and Ex-Apprentices Union
- Gibraltar Confederation of Labour
- Gibraltar Labour Trades Union

== Greece ==
- Trade unions in Greece

== Greenland ==
- Danish Association of Lawyers and Economists (DJØF; DJØF Kalaallit Nunaanni)
- Danish Confederation of Professional Associations (AC; Ilinniagaqarluarsimasut Qitiusumik Suleqatigiiffiat)
  - Danish Association of Chartered Surveyors
  - Danish Medical Association (NP; Nakorsat Peqatigiiffiat)
  - Danish Union of Architects (IP; Illussanik Titartaasartut Peqatigiiffiat)
  - Danish Union of Librarians
  - Danish Union of Journalists (TP; Tusagassiuinermi Sulisut Peqatigiiffiat)
- Danish Confederation of Trade Unions (LO)
  - Danish Union of Professional Technicians
  - Danish Union of Public Employees
- Danish Trade Union Confederation
  - Greenlandic Civil Service Confederation (AK; Atorfillit Kattuffiat)
- FTF – Confederation of Professionals in Denmark
  - Danish Association of Pharmaconomists
- Greenlandic Academics Confederation (IK; Ilinniagartuut Kattuffiat)
- Greenlandic Teachers Confederation (IMAK; Ilinniartitsisut Meeqqat Atuarfianneersut Kattuffiat)
- Greenlandic Kindergarten Teachers Confederation (NPK; Nunatsinni Perorsaasut Kattuffiat)
- Greenlandic Nurses Organization (PPK; Peqqissaasut Kattuffiat)
- Greenlandic Supervisors Union (SSK; Sulisunik Siulersuisut Kattuffiat)
- National Confederation of Trade Unions of Greenland (SIK; Sulinermik Inuussutissarsiuteqartut Kattuffiat)

== Grenada ==
- Grenada Trades Union Council

== Guatemala ==
- Central General de Trabajadores de Guatemala
- Comité Pro Acción Sindical
- Confederación de Unidad Sindical de Guatemala
- Unión Sindical de Trabajadores de Guatemala

== Guinea ==
- General Union of the Workers of Guinea
- National Confederation of Guinean Workers
- National Organization of Free Unions of Guinea
- United Trade Union of Guinean Workers

== Guinea-Bissau ==
- National Union of Workers of Guinea-Bissau

== Guyana ==
- Guyana Agricultural and General Workers' Union
- Guyana Labour Union
- National Workers' Union

== Haiti ==
- Batay Ouvriye
- Confederation des Travailleurs Haïtiens
- Coordination Syndicale Haïtienne
- Haitian Trade Union Coordination
- May 1st - Workers' Fight Federation

== Honduras ==
- Central General de Trabajadores
- Federación Unitaria de Trabajadores de Honduras
- Honduras Workers' Confederation

== Hong Kong ==
- Hong Kong and Kowloon Trades Union Council
- Hong Kong Confederation of Trade Unions
- Hong Kong Federation of Trade Unions
- Hong Kong Journalists Association
- Hong Kong Professional Teachers' Union
- Hong Kong Social Workers' General Union
- Joint Organization of Unions - Hong Kong

== Hungary ==
- Autonomous Trade Union Confederation
- Democratic Confederation of Free Trade Unions
- Forum for the Cooperation of Trade Unions

== Iceland ==
- Confederation of State and Municipal Employees of Iceland
- Icelandic Federation of Labour
- Industrial Workers of the World

== India ==
- All India Defence Employees Federation
- Association of Motion Pictures & TV Programme Producer of India
- Bengal Jute Mill Workers' Union
- Bengal Provincial Chatkal Mazdoor Union
- Centre of Indian Trade Unions
  - Bengal Chatkal Mazdoor Union
  - Calcutta Tramways Workers' and Employees' Union
  - Darjeeling District Newspaper Sellers' Union
  - Forward Seamens Union of India
  - Joint Forum of Trade Unions
  - Maharashtra Sugarcane Cutting and Transport Workers Union
  - Otis Elevators Employees Union
  - Steel Plant Employees Union
- Federation of Western India Cine Employees
- Hind Mazdoor Kisan Panchayat
  - Konkan Railway Corporation Employees Union
  - Municipal Mazdoor Union
- Hind Mazdoor Sabha
  - All India Jute Textile Workers' Federation
  - All India Railwaymen's Federation
  - Coimbatore District Textile Workers Union
  - Darjeeling Jela Dokan Sramik Union
  - Kudremukh Shram Shakthi Sanghatan
  - MCF Employees' Union
- Indian National Trade Union Congress
- Kerala Gazetted Officers' Federation
- Labour Progressive Federation
  - NLC Workers Progressive Union
- Maharashtra General Kamgar Union
- Mazdoor Mukti Morcha
- Rashtriya Mill Mazdoor Sangh
- Socialist Trade Union Centre
- Trade Union Centre of India
- Trade Union Coordination Committee
  - Bengal Hawkers Association
- United Trade Union Centre-Lenin Sarani

== Indonesia ==
- Confederation of All Indonesian Workers' Union
- Confederation of Indonesia Prosperous Trade Union
- Congress of Indonesia Unions Alliance
- Indonesian Railways Workers' Union
- Indonesian Trade Union Confederation
- Federation of Indonesian Independent Manufacturing Worker's Union

== Iran ==
=== Historical unions ===
- Central Council of Trade Unions
- Central Council of United Trade Unions
- Central Union of Workers and Peasants of Iran
- Ettehadiyeh-ye Sendika-ye Kargaran-e Iran
- Union of Toilers of Iran

=== Current unions ===
- Association of Iranian Journalists
- Iranian Teachers' Trade Association
- Iranian Workers' Solidarity Network
- Syndicate of Workers of Tehran and Suburbs Bus Company
- Workers' House of the Islamic Republic of Iran

== Iraq ==
- Federation of Oil Unions in Iraq
- General Federation of Trade Unions
- Iraqi Federation of Trade Unions

== Ireland ==
- Irish Congress of Trade Unions
- Independent Workers Union of Ireland
- Industrial Workers of the World Wales, Ireland, Scotland, England Regional Administration

== Israel ==
- Histadrut
- Koah LaOvdim

== Italy ==
Major confederations

- Confederazione Italiana Sindacati Lavoratori (CISL)
- Italian General Confederation of Labour (CGIL)
- Unione Italiana del Lavoro (UIL)

Other unions

- Confederazione del Comitati di Base
- CONFSAL
- General Labour Union
- Italian Confederation of Free Workers' Unions
- Italian Confederation of Workers' Trade Unions
- Italian General Confederation of Labour
- Italian Labour Union
- Unione Sindacale Italiana

== Ivory Coast ==
- Centrale des Syndicats Libres de Côte d'Ivoire
- Federation of Autonomous Trade Unions of Ivory Coast
- General Workers Union in Ivory Coast

== Jamaica ==
- Bustamante Industrial Trade Union
- Jamaica Airline Pilots Association
- Jamaica Association of Local Government Officers
- Jamaica Confederation of Trade Unions
- National Workers Union

== Japan ==
- General Union
- Japan Teachers' Union
- National Union of General Workers
- RENGO
- Sohyo
- Tozen
- Zenzōsen

== Jordan ==
- General Federation of Jordanian Trade Unions
- Jordan Dental Association
- Jordanian Engineers Association
- Jordanian teachers' syndicate

== Kazakhstan ==
- Confederation of Labour of Kazakhstan
- Federation of Trade Unions of the Republic of Kazakhstan

== Kenya ==
- Central Organization of Trade Unions

== Kiribati ==
- Kiribati Trade Union Congress

== Kuwait ==
- Kuwait Trade Union Federation

== Kyrgyzstan ==
- Kyrgyzstan Federation of Trade Unions

== Laos ==
- Lao Federation of Trade Unions

== Latvia ==
- Free Trade Confederation of Latvia

== Lebanon ==
- General Confederation of Lebanese Workers
- Lebanese Order of Physicians

== Lesotho ==
- Congress of Lesotho Trade Unions
- Lesotho Congress of Democratic Unions
- Lesotho Trade Union Congress

== Liberia ==
- Liberian Federation of Labour Unions

== Libya ==
- National Trade Unions' Federation

== Liechtenstein ==
- Liechtenstein Employees' Association

== Lithuania ==
- Lithuanian Labour Federation
- Lithuanian Trade Union Confederation
- Lithuanian Trade Union - Solidarity

== Luxembourg ==
- Free Luxembourger Workers' Union
- Luxembourg Confederation of Christian Trade Unions

== Madagascar ==
- Christian Confederation of Malagasy Trade Unions
- Confederation of Malagasy Workers
- United Autonomous Unions of Madagascar

== Malawi ==
- Malawi Congress of Trade Unions

== Malaysia ==
- Congress of Unions of Employees in the Public and Civil Services
- Malaysian Trades Union Congress
- National Council of Unions of the Industrial and Lower Income Group of Government Workers
- National Union of Plantation Workers

== Maldives ==
- Tourism Employees Association of Maldives

== Mali ==
- National Workers' Union of Mali
- Workers' Trade Union Confederation of Mali

== Malta ==
- Confederation of Malta Trade Unions
- General Workers' Union
- Malta Union of Teachers
- Malta Workers' Union

== Mauritania ==
- Free Confederation of Mauritanian Workers
- General Confederation of Mauritanian Workers
- Union of Mauritanian Workers

== Mauritius ==
- Federation of Civil Service Unions
- Federation of Progressive Unions
- Mauritius Labour Congress
- Mauritius Trade Union Congress
- National Trade Unions Confederation
- Organization of Artisans' Unity
- Telecommunications Employees and Staff Association

== Mexico ==
- Authentic Labor Front
- Confederación Revolucionaria de Obreros y Campesinos
- Confederation of Mexican Workers
- General Confederation of Workers
- National Association of Actors (Asociación Nacional de Actores)
- National Social Security Workers Union
- National Union of Mine and Metal Workers of the Mexican Republic
- Regional Confederation of Mexican Workers
- Sindicato de Trabajadores Ferrocarrileros de la República Mexicana
- Sindicato Nacional de Trabajadores de la Educación
- Sindicato Nacional de Trabajadores Petroleros de la República Mexicana
- Union of Cinema Production Workers

== Moldova ==
- Confederation of Trade Unions of the Republic of Moldova

== Monaco ==
- Union of Monaco Trade Unions

== Mongolia ==
- Confederation of Mongolian Trade Unions
- Solidarity Trade Union

== Morocco ==
- Democratic Confederation of Labour
- Democratic Federation of Labour
- General Union of Moroccan Workers
- Moroccan Workers' Union
- National Labour Union of Morocco

== Mozambique ==
- Mozambique Workers' Organization
- National Confederation of Free and Independent Trade Unions of Mozambique

== Myanmar ==
- Federation of Trade Unions of Burma
- Seafarers' Union of Burma

== Namibia ==
- National Union of Namibian Workers
- SWAPO
- Trade Union Congress of Namibia

== Nepal ==
- All Nepal Trade Union Congress
- All Nepal Trade Union Federation
- Integrated Centre of Trade Unions, Nepal
- Nepal National Teachers Association
- Nepal Teachers Association
- Nepal Trade Union Congress

== Netherlands ==
- Christelijk Nationaal Vakverbond
- CNV Public
- Construction and Wood Union
- Federatie Nederlandse Vakbeweging
- General Dutch Construction Union
- Nederlands Verbond van Vakverenigingen
- Transport Workers' Union
- Vakcentrale Voor Middengroepen en Hoger Personeel
- Vrije Bond

== Netherlands Antilles ==
- Bonaire Federation of Labour
- Central General di Trahadonan di Corsow
- Trade Union Centre of Curaçao
- Windward Islands Federation of Labour

== New Zealand ==
- Amalgamated Workers Union of New Zealand
  - Central Amalgamated Workers' Union
  - Northern Amalgamated Workers' Union
  - Southern Amalgamated Workers' Union
- APEX
- Association of Salaried Medical Specialists
- Association of Staff in Tertiary Education Te Hau Takatini o Aotearoa
- Association of University Staff of New Zealand
- Clothing, Laundry and Allied Workers Union of Aotearoa
- Corrections Association of New Zealand
- Customs Officers' Association of New Zealand
- Engineering, Printing and Manufacturing Union
- Finance and Information Workers Union
- Firestone Employees Society
- Flight Attendants and Related Services Association
- Furniture, Manufacturing & Associated Workers Union
- Maritime Union of New Zealand
- Meat Union Aotearoa
- National Distribution Union
- National Union of Public Employees
- New Zealand Air Line Pilots' Association
- New Zealand Building Trades Union
- New Zealand Council of Trade Unions
- New Zealand Dairy Workers Union
- New Zealand Educational Institute Te Riu Roa
- New Zealand Meat & Related Trades Workers Union
- New Zealand Nurses Organisation
- New Zealand Professional Firefighters Union
- New Zealand Public Service Association
- New Zealand Writers Guild
- NZ Merchant Service Guild Industrial Union of Workers
- Post Primary Teachers' Association
- Rail & Maritime Transport Union
- Service & Food Workers Union of Aotearoa
- Solidarity Union
- Unite Union

== Nicaragua ==
- Confederation of Labour Unification
- Nicaraguan Workers' Centre
- Sandinista Workers' Centre

== Niger ==
- Democratic Confederation of Workers of Niger
- General Union of Workers of Niger
- Union of Workers' Trade Unions of Niger

== North Macedonia ==
- Federation of Trade Unions of Macedonia

== Norway ==
- Confederation of Unions for Professionals, Norway
- Confederation of Vocational Unions
- EL & IT Forbundet
- Federation of Norwegian Professional Associations
- NITO
- Norwegian Civil Service Union
- Norwegian Confederation of Trade Unions(LO)
- Norwegian Post and Communications Union
- Norwegian Prison and Probation Officers’ Union
- Norwegian Seafarers' Union
- Norwegian Syndicalist League
- Norwegian Transport Workers' Union
- Norwegian Union of Food, Beverage and Allied Workers
- Norwegian Union of General Workers
- Norwegian Union of Industry and Energy Workers
- Norwegian Union of Municipal and General Employees
- Union of Employees in Commerce and Offices
- United Federation of Trade Unions

== Pakistan ==
- All Pakistan Federation of Labour
- All Pakistan Federation of Trade Unions
- All Pakistan Federation of United Trade Unions
- All Pakistan Trade Union Congress
- All Pakistan Trade Union Federation
- Pakistan Labour Federation
- Pakistan National Federation of Trade Unions
- Pakistan Trade Union Defence Campaign
- Pakistan Transport & General Workers' Federation
- Pakistan Workers Confederation
- Pakistan Workers' Federation
- Railway Worker's Union

== Panama ==
- Central National de Trabajadores de Panama
- Confederation of Workers of the Republic of Panama
- Convergencia Sindical
- General Confederation of Workers of Panama
- SUNTRACS

== Papua New Guinea ==
- Papua New Guinea Trade Union Congress

== Paraguay ==
- Central Unitaria de Trabajadores
- Confederación Paraguaya de Trabajadores
- National Workers' Central
- Paraguayan Regional Workers' Federation

== Peru ==
- Central Autónoma de Trabajadores del Perú
- Confederación de Trabajadores del Perú
- Confederación General de Trabajadores del Perú
- Confederación Unitaria de Trabajadores del Perú

== Philippines ==
- Federation of Free Workers
- May First Labour Movement Centre
- Trade Union Congress of the Philippines

== Poland ==
- All-Poland Alliance of Trade Unions
- Solidarity
- Trade Unions Forum
- Workers' Initiative

== Portugal ==
- General Confederation of Labour
- General Confederation of the Portuguese Workers
- General Union of Workers
- National Workers' Union
- Union of Independent Trade Unions

== Puerto Rico ==
- General Confederation of Workers
- Teachers' Federation of Puerto Rico

== Romania ==
- Democratic Trade Union Confederation of Romania
- General Association of All Workers of Romania

- Deșteptarea (1879)

- National Confederation of Free Trade Unions of Romania - Brotherhood
- National Trade Union Bloc
- National Trade Union Confederation
- National Trade Union Confederation - Meridian

== Russia ==
- Confederation of Labour of Russia
- Federation of Independent Trade Unions of Russia
- Sotsprof
- Union of Trade Unions of Russia

== Rwanda ==
- Trade Union Centre of Workers of Rwanda
- Union of Workers in Industry, Garages, Construction Firms, Mines and Printers

== Saint Kitts and Nevis ==
- St. Kitts and Nevis Trades and Labour Union

== Saint Vincent and the Grenadines ==
- Commercial, Technical and Allied Workers' Union
- National Labour Congress
- National Workers' Movement
- St. Vincent and the Grenadines Public Service Union

== Samoa ==
- Samoa Public Service Association
- Samoa Trade Union Congress

== San Marino ==
- Democratic Confederation of San Marino Workers
- San Marino Confederation of Labour

== São Tomé and Príncipe ==
- General Union of the Workers of São Tomé and Príncipe
- National Organization of the Workers of São Tomé and Príncipe - Central Union

== Senegal ==
- Dakar Dem Dikk Workers Democratic Union
- Democratic Union of Senegalese Workers
- National Confederation of Senegalese Workers
- National Union of Autonomous Trade Unions of Senegal

== Serbia ==
- Postmans Trade Union

== Seychelles ==
- Seychelles Federation of Workers' Unions
- Seychelles Workers Union

== Sierra Leone ==
- Sierra Leone Confederation of Trade Unions
- Sierra Leone Labour Congress

== Singapore ==
- National Trades Union Congress

== Slovakia ==
- Confederation of Trade Unions of the Slovak Republic
- Independent Christian Trade Unions of Slovakia
- Priama akcia
- Unity Trade Union

== Slovenia ==
- Association of Free Trade Unions of Slovenia
- Confederation of New Trade Unions of Slovenia
- Confederation of Trade Unions of Slovenia - Pergam
- Trade Union Confederation 90 of Slovenia

== Solomon Islands ==
- Solomon Islands Council of Trade Unions

== South Africa ==
- Confederation of South African Workers' Unions
  - Solidarity
- Congress of South African Trade Unions
  - Association of Mineworkers and Construction Union
  - Chemical, Energy, Paper, Printing, Wood and Allied Workers' Union
  - Communication Workers Union
  - Democratic Nursing Organisation of South Africa
  - Food and Allied Workers Union
  - Musicians Union of South Africa
  - National Education, Health and Allied Workers' Union
  - National Union of Metalworkers of South Africa
  - Performing Arts Workers' Equity
  - Police and Prisons Civil Rights Union
  - SASBO - The Finance Union
  - South African Agricultural Plantation and Allied Workers Union
  - South African Commercial, Catering and Allied Workers Union
  - South African Democratic Nurses' Union
  - South African Democratic Teachers Union
  - South African Football Players Union
  - South African Medical Association
  - South African Municipal Workers' Union
  - South African State and Allied Workers' Union
  - South African Transport and Allied Workers Union
  - Southern African Clothing and Textile Workers Union
- Federation of Unions of South Africa
  - Health & Other Services Personnel Trade Union of South Africa
  - Independent Municipal & Allied Trade Union
  - Public Servants Association of South Africa
  - United Association of South Africa
- National Council of Trade Unions
  - Association of Mineworkers and Construction Union
- National Professional Teachers' Organisation of South Africa

== South Korea ==
- Federation of Korean Trade Unions
- Korean Confederation of Trade Unions
- Korean Teachers & Education Workers' Union

== Spain ==
- Agrarian Trade Union Federation
- Basque Workers' Solidarity
- Confederación General del Trabajo
- Confederación Nacional del Trabajo
- Confederación Intersindical Galega
- Intersindical - Confederació Sindical Catalana
- Langile Abertzaleen Batzordeak
- Spanish Trade Union Organisation
- Typographic Workers Trade Union
- Unión General de Trabajadores
- Workers Collectives
- Workers in Struggle Collectives
- Workers' Commissions

== Sri Lanka ==
- All Ceylon United Motor Workers' Union
- Ceylon Federation of Labour
- Ceylon Mercantile Union
- GCSU Sri Lanka
- National Union of Workers
- United Corporations and Mercantile Union

== Sudan ==
- Sudanese Workers' Trade Union Federation

== Suriname ==
- Federation of Civil Service Organizations
- General Alliance of Labour Unions in Suriname
- Organization of Cooperating Autonomous Trade Unions
- Progressive Labour Federation 47

== Swaziland ==
- Swaziland Federation of Labour
- Swaziland Federation of Trade Unions

== Sweden ==
- Central Organisation of the Workers of Sweden
- Swedish Confederation of Professional Associations
- Swedish Confederation of Professional Employees
- Swedish Trade Union Confederation

== Switzerland ==
- Swiss Federation of Trade Unions
- Travail.Suisse

== Syria ==
- General Federation of Trade Unions

== Taiwan ==
- Chinese Federation of Labour
- Taiwan Confederation of Trade Unions

== Tajikistan ==
- Tajikistan Federation of Trade Unions

== Tanzania ==
- Tanzania Teachers' Union
- Trade Union' Congress of Tanzania
- Zanzibar Trade Union Congress

== Thailand ==
- Labour Congress of Thailand
- National Congress of Thai Labour
- Thai Trade Union Congress

== Timor-Leste ==
- Timor-Leste Trade Union Confederation

== Togo ==
- National Confederation of Togolese Workers
- National Union of Independent Trade Unions of Togo
- Trade Union Confederation of Togolese Workers

== Tonga ==
- Friendly Islands Teachers' Association
- Tonga Nurses' Association

== Trinidad and Tobago ==
=== Current unions ===
- Airline Superintendents Association
- Amalgamated Workers Union
- Association of Technical, Administrative and Supervisory Staff
- Aviation, Communication and Allied Workers Union
- Banking, Insurance and General Workers Union
- Communication, Transport and General Workers Union
- Communication Workers Union
- Customs and Excise Extra Guards Association
- Electronic Media Union of Trinidad and Tobago
- Estate Police Association
- Federation of Independent Trade Unions and Non-Governmental Organisations
- Fire Services Association
- Managers and Supervisors Association
- National Petroleum Staff Association
- National Trade Union Centre of Trinidad and Tobago
- National Union of Domestic Employees
- National Union of Government and Federated Workers
- National Workers' Union
- Oilfields Workers' Trade Union
- Public Services Association
- Seamen and Waterfront Workers Trade Union
- Steel Workers Union of Trinidad and Tobago
- Transport and Industrial Workers Union
- Trinidad and Tobago Airline Pilots Association
- Trinidad and Tobago Postal Workers Union
- Trinidad and Tobago Unified Teachers Association
- Union of Commercial and Industrial Workers

=== Historical unions ===
- All Trinidad Sugar Estates and Factory Workers Union
- Amalgamated Engineering and General Workers' Trade Union
- Bank and General Workers Union
- Bank Employees' Union
- British Colonial Taxpayers and All Workers Union
- Civil Service Association
- Communication Services and General Workers Trade Union
- Federated Workers Trade Union
- Government Farm and Nursery Workers Trade Union
- Industrial and Railway Employees Trade Union
- National Union of Government Employees
- Oilfields Workers Trade Union
- Public Works and Public Service Workers Trade Union
- Staff Association of Barclays Bank of Trinidad and Tobago Limited
- TTT Senior Staff Association
- Works and Hydraulics Industrial Workers Union

== Tunisia ==
- Tunisian General Labour Union (created in 1946)

== Turkey ==
- Confederation of Public Workers' Unions
- Confederation of Revolutionary Trade Unions of Turkey
- Confederation of Turkish Real Trade Unions
- Confederation of Turkish Trade Unions
- Industrial Workers of the World

== Turkmenistan ==
- National Centre of Trade Unions of Turkmenistan

== Tuvalu ==
- Tuvalu Overseas Seamen's Union

== Uganda ==
- National Organization of Trade Unions

== Ukraine ==
- Confederation of Free Trade Unions of Ukraine
- Federation of Trade Unions of Ukraine
- National Confederation of the Trade-Union Organizations of Ukraine

== United Kingdom ==
- General Federation of Trade Unions
- Scottish Trades Union Congress
- Trades Union Congress

=== Current unions ===
The following is a list of major independent trade unions, which are solely accountable to their members and free from employer domination as it stood on 31 March 2012.

- Associated Society of Locomotive Engineers and Firemen (ASLEF)
- Association of Teachers and Lecturers (ATL)
- Bakers, Food and Allied Workers Union (BFAWU)
- British Air Line Pilots Association (BALPA)
- British Medical Association (medical doctors; BMA)
- Broadcasting, Entertainment, Cinematograph and Theatre Union (BECTU)
- Ceramic and Allied Trades Union (CATU)
- Communication Workers Union (CWU)
- Community
- Community and Youth Workers' Union
- Connect - formerly the Society of Telecommunications Executives (STE)
- Doctors In Unite (medical doctors; affiliated with Unite and the TUC)
- Educational Institute of Scotland (EIS)
- EQUITY (actors)
- Fire Brigades Union (FBU)
- First Division Association (senior civil servants)
- GMB (general workers' union)
- Graphical, Paper and Media Union (GPMU)
- Hospital Consultants and Specialists Association (HCSA)
- Industrial Workers of the World (IWW)
- International Union of Sex Workers (IUSW)
- Musicians' Union (MU)
- National Association of Probation Officers (NAPO)
- National Association of Schoolmasters Union of Women Teachers (NASUWT)
- National Union of Journalists (NUJ)
- National Union of Marine, Aviation and Shipping Transport Officers (NUMAST)
- National Union of Mineworkers (NUM)
- National Union of Rail, Maritime and Transport Workers (RMT)
- National Union of Teachers (NUT)
- Offshore Industry Liaison Committee (OILC)
- Prison Officers Association (POA)
- Professional Association of Teachers (PAT)
- Professional Footballers Association (PFA)
- Prospect (engineering, scientific, management and professional staff)
- Public and Commercial Services Union (PCS)
- Royal College of Nursing (RCN; legally a professional society rather than a trade union)
- Scottish Artists Union SAU
- Sex Workers Union (SWU)
- Society of Radiographers (SoR)
- Solidarity Federation
- Transport and General Workers Union (T&G / TGWU)
- Transport Salaried Staffs' Association (TSSA)
- Undeb Cenedlaethol Athrawon Cymru (National Union of Teachers of Wales; UCAC)
- UNIFI (financial services)
- Union of Construction, Allied Trades and Technicians (UCATT)
- Union of Shop, Distributive and Allied Workers (USDAW)
- UNISON (public services)
- Unite - the Union
- University and College Union, amalgam of the AUT and NATFHE
- Writers' Guild of Great Britain (WGGB)

== United States ==
=== AFL–CIO ===
(The American Federation of Labor and Congress of Industrial Organizations)

- Air Line Pilots Association
- Amalgamated Transit Union
- American Federation of Government Employees
- American Federation of Musicians
- American Federation of School Administrators
- American Federation of State, County and Municipal Employees
- American Federation of Teachers
- American Federation of Television and Radio Artists
- American Postal Workers Union
- American Train Dispatchers Department
- Associated Actors and Artistes of America
  - Actors' Equity Association
  - American Guild of Musical Artists
  - American Guild of Variety Artists
  - The Guild of Italian American Actors
  - Screen Actors Guild - American Federation of Television and Radio Artists
- Bakery, Confectionery, Tobacco Workers and Grain Millers' International Union
- Brotherhood of Railroad Signalmen
- California Nurses Association/ National Nurses Organizing Committee
- California School Employees Association
- Communications Workers of America
- Farm Labor Organizing Committee
- Federation of Professional Athletes/National Football League Players Association
- Glass, Molders, Pottery, Plastics and Allied Workers International Union
- International Alliance of Theatrical Stage Employees
- International Association of Bridge, Structural, Ornamental and Reinforcing Iron Workers
- International Association of Fire Fighters
- International Association of Heat and Frost Insulators and Asbestos Workers
- International Association of Machinists and Aerospace Workers
- International Brotherhood of Boilermakers, Iron Ship Builders, Blacksmiths, Forgers and Helpers
- International Brotherhood of Electrical Workers
- International Federation of Professional and Technical Engineers
- International Longshore and Warehouse Union
- International Longshoremen's Association
- International Plate Printers, Die Stampers and Engravers Union of North America
- International Union of Allied Novelty and Production Workers
- International Union of Bricklayers and Allied Craftworkers
- International Union of Elevator Constructors
- International Union of Operating Engineers
- International Union of Painters and Allied Trades
- International Union of Police Associations
- Laborers' International Union of North America
- Marine Engineers Beneficial Association
- National Air Traffic Controllers Association
- National Association of Letter Carriers
- National Football League Players Association
- Office and Professional Employees International Union
- Operative Plasterers' and Cement Masons' International Association
- Professional Aviation Safety Specialists
- San Francisco Building and Construction Trades Council
- Seafarers International Union of North America
- Sheet Metal Workers International Association
- Transport Workers Union of America
- UNITE HERE
- United American Nurses
- United Association of Journeymen and Apprentices of the Plumbing, Pipefitting and Sprinkler Fitting Industry of the United States and Canada
- United Automobile, Aerospace & Agricultural Implement Workers of America International Union
- United Food and Commercial Workers
- United Mine Workers of America
- United Steel, Paper and Forestry, Rubber, Manufacturing, Energy, Allied Industrial and Service Workers International Union
- United Transportation Union
- United Union of Roofers, Waterproofers and Allied Workers
- Utility Workers Union of America
- Writers Guild of America, East

=== Change to Win Federation ===
(The Change to Win Federation)

- International Brotherhood of Teamsters
- Service Employees International Union
  - Workers United
- United Farm Workers of America

=== Independent ===
- Aircraft Mechanics Fraternal Association
- Coalition of Graduate Employee Unions
- Directors Guild of America
- Dramatists Guild of America
- Fraternal Order of Police
- Independent Pilots Association
- Industrial Workers of the World
- Jockeys' Guild
- Major League Baseball Players Association
- National Basketball Players Association
- National Education Association
- National Rural Letter Carriers Association
- National Treasury Employees Union
- NHL Players Association
- Professional Lacrosse Players' Association
- Programmers Guild
- Stage Directors and Choreographers Society
- United Brotherhood of Carpenters and Joiners of America
- United Electrical, Radio and Machine Workers of America
- US Airline Pilots Association
- World Umpires Association
- Writers Guild of America, west

=== Union reform groups ===
- Labor Notes
- Teamsters for a Democratic Union

== Uruguay ==
- Plenario Intersindical de Trabajadores - Convención Nacional de Trabajadores
- Uruguayan Regional Workers' Federation

== Uzbekistan ==
- Federation of Trade Unions of Uzbekistan

== Vanuatu ==
- Vanuatu Council of Trade Unions

== Vatican City ==
- Association of Vatican Lay Workers

== Venezuela ==
- Confederación de Trabajadores de Venezuela
- Movimiento Nacional de Trabajadores Para La Liberación
- Unión Nacional de Trabajadores de Venezuela

== Vietnam ==
- Vietnamese General Confederation of Labour

== Western Sahara ==
- General Workers' Union of Saguia el-Hamra and Río de Oro

== Yemen ==
- Yemeni Confederation of Labor Unions

== Zambia ==
- Federation of Free Trade Unions of Zambia
- Zambia Congress of Trade Unions
- Zambia Union of Financial Institutions and Allied Workers

== Zimbabwe ==
- Zimbabwe Congress of Trade Unions, which includes the defunct African Trade Union Congress

== See also ==
- List of civic, fraternal, service, and professional organizations
- List of employer associations
- List of federations of trade unions
- History of trade unions in the USSR
- List of international labor organizations
