= National Workers' Union =

National Workers' Union may refer to:

- National Workers' Union (Dominica)
- National Workers' Union (Guyana)
- National Workers Union (Jamaica)
- National Workers' Union (Saint Lucia)
- National Workers' Union (Poland)
- National Workers' Union (Portugal)
- National Workers Union (Trinidad & Tobago)
- Unión Nacional de Trabajadores de Venezuela
