= NWU =

NWU may mean:

- Nagoya Women's University, Japan
- Nara Women's University, Japan
- National Workers' Union (Dominica)
- National Workers' Union (Guyana)
- National Workers Union (Jamaica)
- National Workers' Union (Trinidad & Tobago)
- National Writers Union, an American trade union for freelance and contract writers
- Nebraska Wesleyan University, a private liberal arts college in Lincoln, Nebraska
- Northwestern University, a private university in Evanston, Illinois
- Northwestern University (Philippines), a university in Laoag City, Ilocos Norte, Philippines
- North-West University, a multi-campus institution in South Africa
- Northwest University, China, a Chinese university located in Xi'an City, Shaanxi Province, China
- Wii U, a 2012 Nintendo video game console (as in Nintendo Wii U)
- Navy Working Uniform, one of the United States Navy's uniforms
- N.W.U (album), a Japanese-language pop album by South Korean band F.T. Island
