= AWUNZ =

AWUNZ may mean:

- Northern Amalgamated Workers' Union in New Zealand
- Southern Amalgamated Workers' Union in New Zealand
