= Works and Hydraulics Industrial Workers Union =

The Works and Hydraulics Industrial Workers Union was a trade union in Trinidad and Tobago that merged in 1957 with the Government Farm and Nursery Workers Trade Union and the Industrial and Railway Employees Trade Union to form the National Union of Government Employees

== See also ==
- List of trade unions
- Federated Workers Trade Union
- National Union of Government and Federated Workers
