= SSRS =

SSRS may refer to:

- Savez Sindikata Republike Srpske, the Confederation of Trade Unions of the Republika Srpska
- Ship Security Reporting System, a counter piracy system
- SQL Server Reporting Services, a server-based report generation software system from Microsoft
- Swedish Sea Rescue Society, a Swedish search and rescue organization
- Sri Sri Ravi Shankar, Indian spiritual leader
- Barreirinhas Airport, serving Barreirinhas, Brazil, ICAO airport code SSRS
