= Government Farm and Nursery Workers Trade Union =

The Government Farm and Nursery Workers Trade Union was a trade union in Trinidad and Tobago that merged in 1957 with the Industrial and Railway Employees Trade Union and the Works and Hydraulics Industrial Workers Union to form the National Union of Government Employees

== See also ==
- List of trade unions
- Federated Workers Trade Union
- National Union of Government and Federated Workers
