= National Union Government =

A National unity government or National Union Government is a broad coalition government consisting of all major parties in a legislature.

National Union Government may also refer to:

  - National Union Government (1916)
  - National Union Government (1945)

== See also ==
- National Union of Government Employees (NUGE), a former trade union in Trinidad and Tobago
- National Union of Government and Federated Workers, a trade union in Trinidad and Tobago
