= Public Works and Public Service Workers Trade Union =

Trade union in Trinidad and Tobago

The Public Works and Public Service Workers Trade Union was a trade union in Trinidad and Tobago that merged with the National Union of Government Employees in 1959.

== See also ==
- List of trade unions
- Federated Workers Trade Union
- National Union of Government and Federated Workers
