= Trade unions in Saint Lucia =

- National organization(s): Trade Union Federation (TUF)
- Total union membership: 10,000
- Density: 25% (2013)

International Labour Organization
- St Lucia is a member of the ILO

Convention ratification
- Freedom of Association: 14 May 1980
- Right to Organise: 14 May 1980

Trade unions in Saint Lucia first emerged in the 1930s. The St Lucia Teachers' Association was established in 1934 as a professional organisation. Following the formalisation of collective bargaining on the island in 1938, the Saint Lucia Workers' Co-operative Union was founded in 1939.

All unions on the island, with the exception of the National Workers Union, are members of the Trade Union Federation (TUF), the country's national centre.

The following unions currently operate in Saint Lucia:

Union	Established	Sector
National Workers Union	1973	General
Saint Lucia Civil Service Association	1951	Public
Saint Lucia Teachers Union	1934	Education
Saint Lucia Workers' Union	1939	General
Saint Lucia Seamen, Waterfront and General Workers Union	1945	Ports
Vieux-Fort General and Dock Workers Union	1964	General
