= NCTL =

NCTL may refer to:

- National Center on Time & Learning, American educational organisation
- National College for Teaching and Leadership, United Kingdom
- National Congress of Thai Labour, Thailand
- Nembe Creek Trunk Line, a pipeline in Nigeria
