= NWM =

NWM is an initialism which can stand for:

- Nasiah Wanganeen-Milera, Australian rules footballer
- NatWest Markets, the investment banking arm of NatWest Group
- National Workers' Movement, a trade union in Saint Vincent and the Grenadines
- New Milton railway station, Hampshire, National Rail station code
