= Matica =

A Matica or Matice or Matitsa or Matka is a Slavic concept of a foundation which promotes national culture and gained prominence during the 19th-century romantic nationalism.

The Slavic words “matica”, “matice” or “matka” have the same etymological origin as Old French “matrice” or Latin “mātrīx” and are synonymous with them; in this context, the meaning is similar to the use of the term “matrice” in Christianity.

The matica structure has been particularly used among the West Slavic peoples and South Slavic peoples:

- Matica srpska, formed in the Austrian Empire in 1826
- Matice česká, formed in the Austrian Empire in 1831
- Matice moravská, formed in the Austrian Empire in 1849
- Matice opavská, formed in Austria-Hungary in 1877
- Matica hrvatska, formed in the Austrian Empire in 1842
- Maćica Serbska, formed in Kingdom of Saxony in 1847
- Matytsia Halytsko-Ruska, formed in the Austrian Empire in 1848
- Matica slovenská, formed in the Austrian Empire in 1863
- Slovenska matica, formed in the Austrian Empire in 1864
- Macierz Polska, formed in Austria-Hungary in 1882
- Polska Macierz Szkolna, formed in the Russian Empire in 1905
- Balgarska matitsa, formed in the Ottoman Empire in 1909
- Ruska matka, first formed in Democratic Federal Yugoslavia in 1945, and reformed in 1990
- Matica crnogorska, formed in Serbia and Montenegro in 1993

The term has additionally been used to refer to:

- Matica hrvatskih sindikata, Association of Croatian Public Sector Unions
- The magazine Matica, published by Matica crnogorska
