= Electronic Media Union of Trinidad and Tobago =

EMUTT
- Electronic Media Union of Trinidad and Tobago
- Headquarters: Port of Spain, Trinidad and Tobago
- Location: Trinidad and Tobago
- Affiliations: NATUC

The Electronic Media Union of Trinidad and Tobago (EMUTT) is a trade union in Trinidad and Tobago. Its main membership base was in the now defunct National Broadcasting Network (NBN) which was the state broadcasting company. It is affiliated to the National Trade Union Centre of Trinidad and Tobago.

In December 2004, NBN concluded its last collective agreement with EMUTT along with severance packages, before NBN shut down. Together with Senior Staff Association and Union of Commercial and Industrial Workers they won voluntary separation agreements worth $33 million (equivalent to US$5,238,933.74 in 2004).

== See also ==
- List of trade unions
