= British Colonial Taxpayers and All Workers Union =

The British Colonial Taxpayers and All Workers Union was a trade union in Trinidad and Tobago that merged in 1959 with the Federated Workers Trade Union.

== See also ==
- List of trade unions
- National Union of Government and Federated Workers
