= STCS =

STCS may refer to:

== Education ==
- Saginaw Township Community Schools (STCS), Michigan, USA; a school board
- Southern Tier Catholic School (STCS), Olean, NYS, USA; a Montessori school
- St. Clairsville-Richland City School District (STCS), Ohio, USA; a school board
- St. Theresa's Convent Sr. Sec. School (STCS), Karnal, Haryana, India
- Cumilla Signal Training Centre and School (STC&S), Bangladesh Army

== Other uses ==
- Society of Technical Civil Servants, British trade union
- Star Trek: Starship Tactical Combat Simulator (STCS, ST:STCS), a game

== See also ==
- St. Theresa Catholic Secondary School (STCSS), Belleville, Ontario, Canada
- STC (disambiguation), for the singular of STCs
