= LTUC =

LTUC may stand for:

- Lesotho Trade Union Congress
- London Transport Users Committee, now London TravelWatch
