= Nathaniel Crichlow =

Trinidad and Tobago politician (1922–2006)

Nathaniel “Natty” Elliott Crichlow (12 May 1922 – 18 September 2006) was born in Tunapuna, Trinidad and Tobago, and educated at the Tunapuna Roman Catholic School. He was President of the National Union of Government Employees (NUGE) from 1957 and became the first President General of the National Union of Government and Federated Workers (NUGFW) on the merger of the NUGE and the Federated Workers Trade Union in 1967. It was a position he held until his retirement in 1985.

His involvement in the broader trade union movement saw him being President of the Trinidad and Tobago Labour Congress from 1970 to 1974, 1st Vice President from 1974 to 1976 and a subsequent term as 2nd Vice President. He also served as the President of the Caribbean Congress of Labour for a period, and was part of the workers delegation to the International Labour Conference of the International Labour Organization in 1964 and then every year from 1981 to 1985.

On the political front, he was a Senator for the People's National Movement (PNM) from 1963 to 1965 and again from 1976 to 1986.

He represented labour on many state boards and in 1975 was awarded the Chaconia Medal of the Order of the Trinity (Gold).

Trade union offices
Preceded by Richard Ishmael	President of the Caribbean Congress of Labour; 1973–1977	Succeeded by Frank Walcott
