= Ship Security Reporting System =

The Ship Security Reporting System (SSRS) is a counter piracy system that has been developed to combat the increasing instances of hijack and ransom on cargo ships predominantly occurring in the Gulf of Aden and around the Horn of Africa.

Before the development of SSRS, commercial shipping was reliant on the Ship Security Alerting System (SSAS) that contributes to the International Maritime Organization’s initiative to improve maritime security through the Safety of Life at Sea (SOLAS) convention and, more recently, through the International Ship and Port Facility Security Code (ISPS).

The SSRS builds on the Ship Security Alert System (SSAS) that exists on most cargo and passenger ships over 300 gross tons flagged to SOLAS contracting governments by linking the SSAS to naval forces responsible for maritime security in a specific area. The SSRS continually monitors ship security alerts and transmits critical data to participating Naval Operations Centres. The NOC alerts the nearest naval vessel, thus initiating an almost immediate military response.

== See also ==
- International Registries
- International Maritime Organization
- International Convention for the Safety of Life at Sea
- ISPS
- Long-Range Identification and Tracking (LRIT)
- GMDSS
- Ship Security Alert System
