= Amalgamated Engineering and General Workers' Trade Union =

The Amalgamated Engineering and General Workers' Trade Union was a trade union in Trinidad and Tobago that merged in 1959 with the Federated Workers Trade Union.

== See also ==
- List of trade unions
- National Union of Government and Federated Workers
