= CCAS =

CCAS may refer to:

- Center for Contemporary Arab Studies
- Cerebellar Cognitive Affective Syndrome
- Columbian College of Arts and Sciences, the liberal arts and sciences college of The George Washington University
- Committee of Concerned Asian Scholars
- Consejo Coordinador Argentino Sindical
- Council of Colleges of Arts and Sciences
