= Antigua and Barbuda Public Service Association =

Antiguan and Barbudan trade union

ABPSA
- Antigua and Barbuda Public Service Association
- Headquarters: St. John's, Antigua and Barbuda
- Location: Antigua and Barbuda
- Affiliations: ITUC
- Website: Facebook page

The Antigua and Barbuda Public Service Association (ABPSA) is a national Trade union of Antigua and Barbuda. First recognized in the 1980s, the ABPSA is a small organization with competition from other unions in the public service sector.

== See also ==
- List of trade unions
