= Municipal Mazdoor Union =

Trade union in India

- Type: Trade Union
- Location: Mumbai, India

Municipal Mazdoor Union, a trade union of municipal workers in Mumbai. MMU is affiliated to the Hind Mazdoor Kisan Panchayat. MMU was established in December 1955 by Placid D’Mello and George Fernandes.

== Municipal Mazdoor Union ==
Municipal Mazdoor Union is a trade union based in Mumbai, India. It represents workers engaged in municipal services such as sanitation, drainage, pumping, hospitals, and other civic departments.

== Activities ==
The union has been actively involved in raising issues related to workers’ safety and public health rights.

It has organized meetings and conferences in Mumbai regarding healthcare rights.

It has also highlighted healthcare issues in municipal elections.

The union has supported public movements for health rights.

== Leadership ==
- President: Ashok Jadhav
- General Secretary: Waman Kaviskar
- Working President: Yashwantrao Desai
