= Konkan Railway Corporation Employees Union =

Trade union in India

Konkan Railway Corporation Employees Union is a trade union of employees of the Konkan Railway, India. KRCEU is affiliated to the Hind Mazdoor Kisan Panchayat.

In the union elections in 2005, KRCEU got 32% of the votes and lost its hold of the union.
