= Association of Technical, Administrative and Supervisory Staff =

Trade union

ATASS
- Association of Technical, Administrative and Supervisory Staff
- Headquarters: Couva, Trinidad and Tobago
- Location: Trinidad and Tobago

The Association of Technical, Administrative and Supervisory Staff (ATASS) is a trade union in Trinidad and Tobago with the bulk of its members in the former Caroni (1975) Ltd, the state owned sugar industry that closed in July 2003.

Litigation by the union against the company was commenced.

== See also ==
- List of trade unions
