= Aruban Workers' Federation =

Aruban trade union federation

- Federacion di Trahadornan di Aruba
- Founded: 1964
- Headquarters: San Nicolaas, Aruba, Netherlands
- Location: Aruba
- Key people: Hose Gregorio Figaroa, President; Aldrick Pontilius, Vice President
- Affiliations: ITUC

The Aruban Workers' Federation (FTA; Papiamento: Federacion di Trahadornan di Aruba, Dutch: Federatie van Werknemers van Aruba) is a national trade union center in Aruba. It is affiliated with the International Trade Union Confederation.

== See also ==
- List of trade unions
