= Estate Police Association =

- Estate Police Association
- Founded: in 1950, by amendment 15 of 1950
- Headquarters: 70-72 Batoo Avenue, Marabella, Trinidad and Tobago
- Location: Trinidad and Tobago
- Members: 3,000
- Key people: President Deryck Richardson (2018-2022)
- Affiliations: None

The Estate Police Association is a representative labour body that is located in the Republic of Trinidad and Tobago. The Estate Police Association (the Association) came into existence in 1950 by the enactment of Amendment 15 of 1950 to the Supplemental Police Act (the Act). The Association is the sole body authorized by the Act to represent all estate police officers in industrial relations matters.

== The Supplemental Police Act ==
The Supplemental Police Act, Chapter 15:02 was enacted in 1906 and subsequently amended in 1925, 1950, 1955, 1962, 1967, 1979 and 1993.

== 2014-2018 Steve Smart Administration ==
The Executive for the 2014–2018 term was elected on Monday, 8 September 2014 to a four-year term of office. The 2014-2018 Executive was headed by President Steve Smart an included 1st Vice President Paul Francis, 2nd Vice President (Tobago) Ian Baynes, 2nd Vice President (Trinidad) Ancil John-Nicholas, General Secretary Terrance Torres, Assistant General Secretary David Weeks, Education and Research Officer Richard Roopnarine, Public Relations Officer Bryan Wiltshire, Trustee Basil Lewis, Trustee Keith Ramnath, Executive Committee Member Nicholas O'Garrow, Executive Committee Member Alphonso James Daniel, Executive Committee Member Shashi Ranjit and Executive Committee Member Earnest Brown.

== National Executive election for the 2018-2022 term of office ==
Nationwide elections for the National Executive took place in November 2018 where Steve Smart was defeated by new President Deryck Richardson.

== 2018-2022 Deryck Richardson Administration ==
The National Executive for the 2018–2022 term of office consists of President Deryck Richardson, 1st Vice President Dean Richards, 2nd Vice President (Trinidad) Vedesh Bhagwandeen, 2nd Vice President (Tobago) Curtis Joseph, General Secretary Robert Ottley, Assistant General Secretary Ancil John-Nicholas, Treasurer John Hankey, Education and Research Officer Richard Roopnarine, Public Relations Officer Lyndon DeGannes, Trustee Kenneth Joseph, Trustee Hollie Prescod, Executive Committee Member Kesi Lewis, Executive Committee Member Richard Ryan, Executive Committee Member Jason Cooper, Executive Committee Member Stefan Small.

== See also ==
- List of trade unions
