= List of federations of trade unions in Europe =

Trade union federations and confederations in Europe are grouped below by country.

== Austria ==
- Österreichischer Gewerkschaftsbund (Austrian Federation of Unions)

== Czech Republic ==
- Bohemian-Moravian Confederation of Trade Unions – Českomoravská konfederace odborových svazů, ČMKOS

== Slovakia ==
- Unity Trade Union – Odborová Organizácia UNITY

== Finland ==
- Central Organisation of Finnish Trade Unions (SAK)
- Confederation of Unions for Academic Professionals in Finland (AKAVA)
- Finnish Confederation of Salaried Employees (STTK)

== France ==
- The 4 large confederations
  - Confédération Générale du Travail (CGT)
  - Force Ouvrière (FO)
  - Confédération Française Démocratique du Travail (CFDT)
  - Confédération Française des Travailleurs Chrétiens (CFTC)

== Germany ==
- German Confederation of Trade Unions (Deutscher Gewerkschaftsbund, DGB)
- German Civil Service Federation (Deutscher Beamtenbund - dbb)
- German Christian Workers' Federation (Christlicher Gewerkschaftsbund - CGB)

== Ireland ==
- Irish Congress of Trade Unions (ICTU) Note: ICTU is the umbrella organisation for unions operating in both the Republic of Ireland and Northern Ireland. British unions operate in Northern Ireland, as do some all-Ireland unions, and some Northern Ireland-only unions.

== Italy ==
- CGIL (Confederazione Generale Italiana del Lavoro)
- CISL (Confederazione Italiana Sindacati Lavoratori)
- UIL (Unione Italiana del Lavoro)
- CISAL (Confederazione Italiana Sindacati Autonomi Lavoratori)
- CONFSAL (Confederazione Generale dei Sindacati Autonomi dei Lavoratori)
- UGL (Unione Generale del Lavoro)

== The Netherlands ==
- Federatie Nederlandse Vakbeweging FNV
- Christelijk Nationaal Vakverbond CNV

== Poland ==
- All-Poland Alliance of Trade Unions (OPZZ)

== Spain ==
- Comisiones Obreras
- Confederación General del Trabajo (CGT)
- Confederación Nacional del Trabajo (CNT)
- Unión General de Trabajadores (UGT)

== Sweden ==
- The Swedish Trade Union Confederation - Landsorganisationen i Sverige (LO)
- The Swedish Confederation for Professional Employees - Tjänstemännens Centralorganisation (TCO)
- Sveriges Arbetares Centralorganisation (SAC-Syndikalisterna)

== Switzerland ==
- Schweizerischer Gewerkschaftsbund (SGB)

== United Kingdom ==
- Trades Union Congress (TUC)
