= Union of Toilers of Iran =

Former trade union

The Union of Toilers of Iran (Persian: اتحادیه زحمتکشان ایران) was a trade union organization in Iran. On May 8, 1944, it merged into the larger Central Council of United Trade Unions.
