= Haitian Trade Union Coordination =

CSH
- Haitian Trade Union Coordination
- Coordination Syndical Haitien
- Location: Haiti
- Members: 14 unions

The Haitian Trade Union Coordination (CSH) is a trade union structure in Haiti. It collects together 14 established unions. See Coordination Syndicale Haïtienne (CSH).
