= Lesotho Congress of Democratic Unions =

Trade union centre in Lesotho

LECODU
- Lesotho Congress of Democratic Unions
- Founded: May 2004
- Headquarters: Maseru, Lesotho
- Location: Lesotho
- Key people: Ts'eliso Ramochela, general secretary
- Affiliations: CTUC

The Lesotho Congress of Democratic Unions (LECODU) is a national trade union center in Lesotho. It was formed in May, 2004 by the merger of some unions of the Congress of Lesotho Trade Unions and the Lesotho Federation of Democratic Unions (LFDU). Ts'eliso Ramochela, the general secretary of the LFDU, assumed the position of general secretary in the LECODU.
