= Leeward Islands Airline Pilots Association =

Trade union

LIALPA
- Leeward Islands Airline Pilots Association
- Headquarters: Antigua
- Location(s): Antigua and Barbados
- Affiliations: IFALPA

The Leeward Islands Airline Pilots Association (LIALPA) is a trade union in the Leeward Islands and is registered in both Antigua and Barbados.

Currently, all of LIALPA's members fly for LIAT, a regional airline based in Antigua and owned by several eastern the Caribbean governments and organisations.

== See also ==
- List of trade unions
