= Ship Security Alert System =

Security alert system for ships

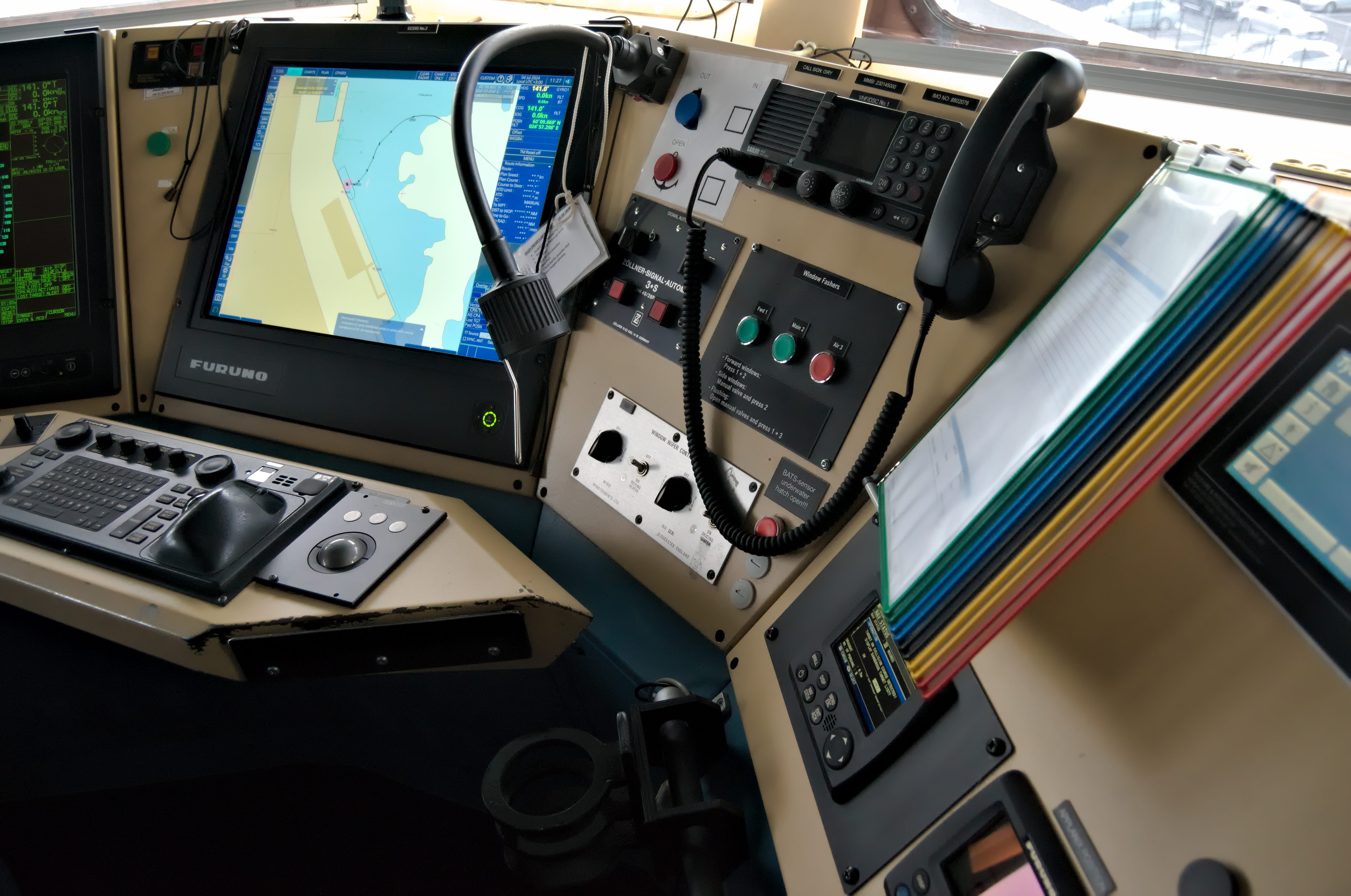
The SSAS should be capable of activation from the ship's navigation bridge

The Ship Security Alert System (SSAS) is provided to a ship for the purpose of transmitting a security alert to the shore to indicate to a competent authority (typically the ship's flag State) that the security of the ship is under threat or has been compromised. In case of a security incident, that may include attempted or actual piracy, terrorism, armed robbery and similar attacks, the ship's SSAS can be activated by the Master and responsible members of the crew to continuously send silent alerts to the flag State, as well as predefined recipients that include the ship's owner (company). The SSAS therefore forms an integral part of the security system for almost all merchant ships.

== Requirement ==
The SOLAS Convention (Chapter XI-2, Regulation 6) which enforces the International Ship and Port Facility Security (ISPS) Code on maritime security requires all ships over 500 GT to be equipped with an SSAS. Only exception are non-passenger vessels of less than 500 GT constructed before 1 July 2004.

== Operation ==
Technically, the SSAS consists of a GPS receiver linked to a transmitter, a power supply, software and activation buttons.

There must be at least two independent activation points on the ship, one on the navigation bridge and the other(s) in places immediately accessible by the crew. This may include the engine room, master's cabin or the crew lounge. The locations of the SSAS activation points and relevant procedure for use must be detailed in the ship's security plan (also required by the ISPS Code). The activation points must be so designed that they cannot be inadvertently activated.

When the ship is under attack, the crew can activate the SSAS beacon by pressing a button which automatically sends a message, usually SMS or email, over satellite connection to predefined recipients such as the ship owner, fleet manager and flag state. An SSAS report contains the ship name, unique identification numbers like MMSI, IMO number and call sign, the date and time, the ship's current position, speed and course. No audible or visible alarm is generated while the SSAS report is being transmitted to prevent discovery of the report by the intruders. Equally, an overt radio/phone acknowledgment of the alert is also not made in case it poses a threat to crew if they have been captured. Once the SSAS button is pressed, the alert will be continuously transmitted to the recipients unless it is reset or deactivated. An SSAS beacon operates with similar principles to the aircraft transponder emergency code 7500.

The alert receivers (the ship's flag State) are obliged to inform the national authorities of the coastal states where the ship is sailing, so that help from nearby coastal State security forces can be dispatched to the location of the ship.

== See also ==
- Cospas-Sarsat
- GMDSS
- Long-Range Identification and Tracking (LRIT)
