= General Union of Djibouti Workers =

Trade union centre in Djibouti

UGTD
- General Union of Djibouti Workers
- Union Générale des Travailleurs de Djibouti
- Location: Djibouti
- Key people: Kamil Diraneth Hared, general secretary

The General Union of Djibouti Workers (UGTD) is a trade union centre in Djibouti. It was the official union arm of the government until 1995, when protests and conflicts separated the two. The UGTD now works closely with the UDT.
