= TTT Senior Staff Association =

Trade union in Trinidad and Tobago

TTTSSA
- TTT Senior Staff Association
- Headquarters: Port of Spain, Trinidad and Tobago
- Location: Trinidad and Tobago

The TTT Senior Staff Association was a trade union in Trinidad and Tobago that organised senior staff at TTT, the Trinidad and Tobago Television service. TTT was merged into the National Broadcasting Network (NBN) and was later closed.

In 2004 a Senior Staff Association was one of three unions representing staff of the National Broadcasting Network in negotiations over a voluntary separation package, after the government decided to close NBN and replace it with a new state broadcaster.

== See also ==
- List of trade unions
