= Matice česká =

Czech publishing house

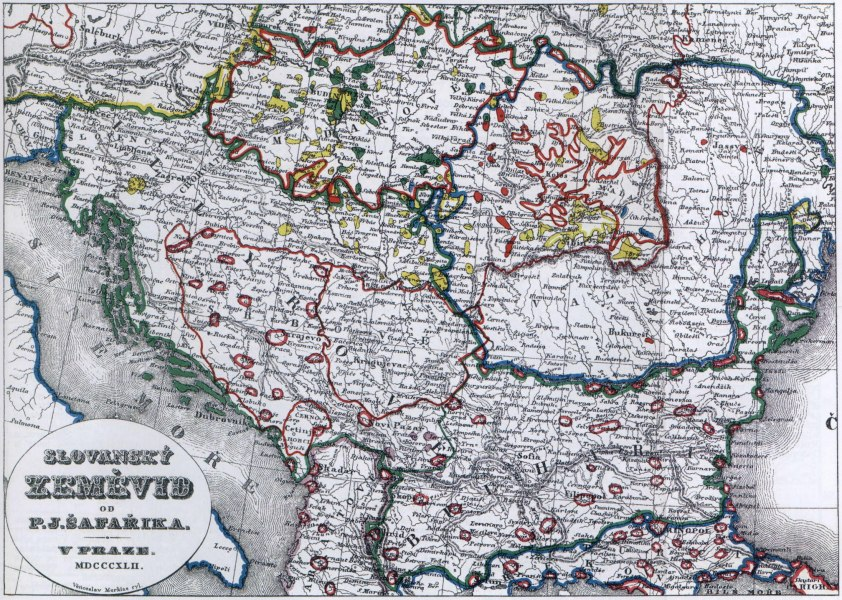
Map of Balkans by Pavel Josef Šafařík published by Matice česká

Matice česká was a Czech publishing house and cultural institution, similar to other Slavic Matice institutions. It was an important milestone in Czech National Revival.

It was established by František Palacký in 1831 at the National Museum and played an important role in preservation of the Czech language.

Counterparts of Matice česká (Bohemia) in other Czech lands were Matice moravská (Moravia) and Matice slezská (Austrian Silesia).
