= STC =

STC may refer to:

== Education ==
- Saint Theresa's College (disambiguation), several institutions
- St. Thomas' College, Matale, Sri Lanka
- S. Thomas' College, Mount Lavinia, Sri Lanka
- Scott Theological College, Kenya
- Sha Tin College, Hong Kong
- Siaʻatoutai Theological College, Tonga
- South Tama County Community School District, Iowa, US
- South Texas College, Texas, US
- South Tyneside College, Tyne & Wear, UK

== Organizations ==
- stc Group (Saudi Telecom Company), Saudi Arabia
- Scarborough Town Centre, a shopping mall in Toronto, Canada
- SeeBeyond Technology Corporation, originally Software Technology Corporation
- Shakespeare Theatre Company, Washington, D.C., US
- SHAPE Technical Centre, a former agency within NATO
- Society for Technical Communication, a former professional association
- Solidaridad de Trabajadores Cubanos (Cuban Workers' Solidarity), a Cuban trade union
- Southern Transitional Council, former secessionist organization in South Yemen
- Space Transport Corporation, a former American company
- Standard Telephones and Cables (1917–1991), a British corporation
  - Nortel F. C., a football club formerly called Standard Telephones and Cables F. C.
- STC Recordings, a record label
- STCmicro, a Chinese manufacturer of Intel MCS-51 compatible microcontrollers
- Stewart Information Services Corporation (New York Stock Exchange Ticker symbol STC)
- Student Transportation of Canada, a US–based school bus contractor
- Sydney Theatre Company, Australia
- Sydney Turf Club, an Australian horse-racing venue operator
- Storage Technology Corporation (StorageTek), a former American data storage company

== Science and technology ==
- Sensitivity time control, a radar signal processing technique
- Silicon tetrachloride, a chemical compound
- Sound transmission class, a rating of how well a building partition attenuates airborne sound
- Space–time code, used to improve the reliability of data transmission in wireless communication systems
- Spike-triggered covariance, an analysis tool for characterizing a neuron's response properties
- Standard test conditions, a measurement standard for PV solar panels
- Stanniocalcin, a hormone, and the gene encoding for it

== Transportation ==
- Singapore Traction Company, a tram, trolleybus and motor operator in Singapore
- Saskatchewan Transportation Company, a former Canadian Crown corporation
- Sistema de Transporte Colectivo, operates the Mexico City Metro mass transit system
- Supplemental type certificate, an approved major modification to an existing aircraft
- Intercity STC, a Ghanaian transport company

=== Stations, ports, depots ===
- St. Cloud Regional Airport (IATA airport code STC), Minnesota, US
- Santacruz railway station (station code STC), Mumbai, Maharashtra, India
- STC metro station, Riyadh, Saudi Arabia
- Sengkang MRT/LRT station (LRT station code STC), Singapore

== Other uses ==
- Short-title catalogue, a bibliographical resource
- Sonic the Comic, a British children's comic
- The Soundtrack Channel, a satellite television channel

== See also ==
- Dynamic Stability and Traction Control (DSTC), a type of vehicle electronic stability control
- South Thames Colleges Group (STCG), London, England, UK
- STCS (disambiguation)
- ST-100
