= Central Autônoma de Trabalhadores =

CAT
- Central Autónoma de Trabalhadores
- Headquarters: São Paulo, Brazil
- Location: Brazil
- Key people: Laerte Teixeira Da Costa, president Eduardi Gauterio Gallo, secretary general
- Affiliations: ITUC
- Website: www.cat-ipros.org.br

The Central Autónoma de Trabalhadores is a trade union federation in Brazil. It is affiliated with the International Trade Union Confederation.
