= Movimiento Nacional de Trabajadores Para La Liberación =

Venezuelan trade union

MONTRAL
- Movimiento Nacional de Trabajadores Para La Liberación
- Founded: 1974
- Headquarters: Caracas, Venezuela
- Location: Venezuela
- Key people: Dagoberto González, president
- Affiliations: ITUC

The Movimiento Nacional de Trabajadores Para La Liberación (MONTRAL) is a national trade union center in Venezuela. It was formed in 1974 and is affiliated to the International Trade Union Confederation.
