= Revolutionary Trade Unions Federation =

DEV-İŞ
- Revolutionary Trade Unions Federation
- Devrimci İşçi Sendikaları Federasyonu
- Founded: 1976
- Headquarters: Nicosia, Cyprus
- Location: Cyprus
- Key people: Koral Aşam, President
- Affiliations: WFTU
- Website: dev-is.org

The Revolutionary Trade Unions Federation (DEV-İŞ) is a trade union centre in Cyprus. It is affiliated with the World Federation of Trade Unions. The organization traces its origins to 1975, when workers founded several trade unions that form the basis of the DEV-İŞ confederation.
