= St. Vincent and the Grenadines Public Service Union =

PSU
- St. Vincent and the Grenadines Public Service Union
- Headquarters: Kingstown, Saint Vincent and the Grenadines
- Location: Saint Vincent and the Grenadines
- Key people: Elroy Boucher President; Shelly-Ann Alexander-Ross general secretary
- Website: www.psusvg.com

The St. Vincent and the Grenadines Public Service Union (PSU) is a trade union in Saint Vincent and the Grenadines.
