= Zambia Union of Financial Institutions and Allied Workers =

Dominant financial trade union in Zambia

ZUFIAW
- Zambia Union of Financial Institutions and Allied Workers
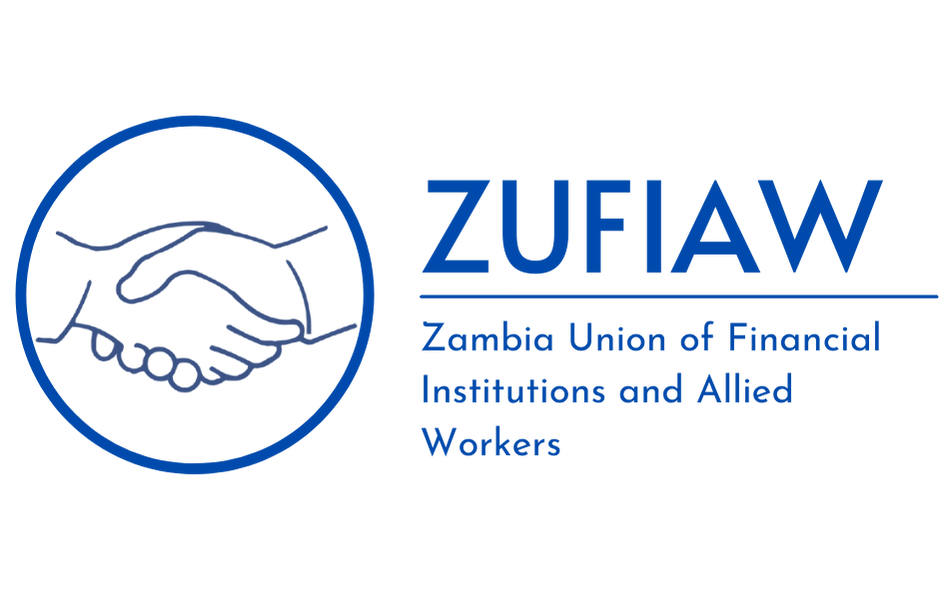
- Founded: 1961
- Headquarters: Lusaka, Zambia
- Location: Zambia
- Members: 5000
- Key people: Marina Kabonga, President; Kasapo Sundrea Kabende, Secretary General
- Affiliations: UNI Global Union Federation of Free Trade Unions of Zambia
- Website: www.zufiaw.org

Zambia Union of Financial Institutions and Allied Workers (ZUFIAW) is the dominant financial trade union in Zambia.

The union was founded on 17 November 1961 as Rhodesian Society of Bank Officials. Its name was changed to Zambia Union of Bank Officials on 23 November 1970, then Zambia Union of Financial Institutions in 1978. It was given its current name in 1984. ZUFIAW last had a countrywide strike in 1985.

ZUFIAW represents employees in the following sectors: banks, insurance, building societies, micro-finance, pensions, and all financial related and allied institutions.

It currently has 26 member unionised institutions. Joyce Nonde-Simukoko was General Secretary of ZUFIAW from 1998 to 2013. Nonde-Simukoko was later appointed as Cabinet Minister and took the office of the Minister of Labour and Social Security. At the 13th Quadrennial Conference in 2021, Kasapo Sundrea Kabende was elected General Secretary, and Alfred Chifota as President.

The ZUFIAW is affiliated to the UNI Global Union UNI Global Union and Federation of Free Trade Unions of Zambia.

== Presidents ==
- 1986: Peter Mulenga
- 1995: Bright Nyirenda
- 1998: Siisi Mutukwa
- 2002: Cephas Mukuka
- 2013: Ackim Mweemba
- 2021: Alfred Chifota
- 2024: Charles Mukuka
- 2024: Marina Kabonga (Ms.)

== General Secretaries ==
- 1971: C Chibesakunda
- 1994: G P Aliklipo
- 1998: Joyce Nonde-Simukoko (Ms.)
- 2013: Chingati Msiska
- 2021: Kasapo Sundrea Kabende
