= Bangladesh Jatiyo Sramik Jote =

National trade union federation

- Bangladesh Jatiyo Sramik Jote
- Headquarters: Dhaka, Bangladesh
- Location: Bangladesh
- Affiliations: WFTU

The Bangladesh Jatiyo Sarmik Jote (translation: Bangladesh National Workers Alliance) is a national trade union federation in Bangladesh. It is affiliated with the World Federation of Trade Unions.
