= Postmans Trade Union =

Postman Trade Union Sindikat Dostavljača PTT pošiljaka "Poštar
- Formation: December 2, 2008; 17 years ago
- Type: Trade Union
- Headquarters: Apatin, Serbia
- Location: Serbia
- President: Goran Krsman
- Secretary: Dragan Ličina
- Website: www.sdpostar.com

The Postman Trade Union "Postman" (Serbian: Sindikat Dostavljača PTT pošiljaka "Poštar") is national trade union of postmen employed in Pošta Srbije, the national Post Office of the Republic of Serbia. It was formed December 2, 2008 by Goran Krsman and Dragan Ličina. It is the youngest trade union in Serbian Post Office.
