= Kudremukh Shram Shakthi Sanghatan =

Miners' trade union in Karnataka, India

Kudremukh Shram Shakthi Sanghatan (KSSS, Kudremukh Labour Power Organization), a trade union at the Kudremukh Iron Ore Company Ltd., Karnataka, India.

KSSS is affiliated to Hind Mazdoor Sabha. The general secretary of KSSS is S. Venkataraya, and the President is M. Sureshchandra Shetty Asst General Secretary is A Rajaguru. other office bearers are S R Kubera setty Ashwathanarayana B T Padmanabha Shetty Suresh Babu Channakeshava B R.
