= Trade Union Confederation 90 of Slovenia =

KS 90
- Trade Union Confederation 90 of Slovenia
- Konfederacija sindikatov 90 Slovenije
- Founded: February 1991
- Headquarters: Ljubljana, Slovenia
- Location: Slovenia
- Key people: Boris Mazalin, president
- Website: www.sindikat-ks90.si

The Trade Union Confederation 90 of Slovenia (Slovene: Konfederacija sindikatov 90 Slovenije) (KS 90) is a trade union confederation of Slovenia. It was formed in February 1991 and is based in the south-west area of the country.
