= Tonga Nurses' Association =

Trade union in Tonga

TNA
- Tonga Nurses' Association
- Headquarters: Nukuʻalofa, Tonga
- Location: Tonga
- Key people: Pisila Sovaleni, general secretary
- Affiliations: ITUC

The Tonga Nurses' Association (TNA) is a trade union in Tonga. It is affiliated with the International Trade Union Confederation.
