= Central General di Trahadonan di Corsow =

Trade union federation in Curaçao

CGTC
- Central General di Trahadonan di Corsow
- Headquarters: Willemstad, Curaçao
- Location: Curacao, Dutch Caribbean, former Netherlands Antilles
- Key people: Roland Ignacio, Secretary General, Kenneth Valpoort, deputy secretary general
- Affiliations: ITUC

The Central General di Trahadonan di Corsow (CGTC) is a trade union federation on the island Curaçao in the Netherlands Antilles. It is affiliated with the International Trade Union Confederation.
