= Sierra Leone Confederation of Trade Unions =

Trade Union Confederation of Sierra Leone (TUC-SL)
- Sierra Leone Confederation of Trade Unions
- TUC-SL
- Founded: 1996
- Headquarters: Freetown, Sierra Leone
- Location: Sierra Leone
- Key people: Mr. Falla Ensa-N'Dayma, National President

The Sierra Leone Confederation of Trade Unions (TUC-SL) is a national trade union center in Sierra Leone. It was founded in 1996.
