= National Centre of Trade Unions of Turkmenistan =

- National Centre of Trade Unions of Turkmenistan
- Location: Turkmenistan
- Members: 1.3 million (claimed)
- Key people: Rejepbai Arazov, chairman

The National Centre of Trade Unions of Turkmenistan is the sole trade union centre in Turkmenistan. It is a continuation of the Soviet model of trade union. It claims a membership of 1.3 million.
