= Equatorial Guinea Workers' Union =

UST
- Equatorial Guinea Workers' Union
- Location: Equatorial Guinea

The Equatorial Guinea Workers' Union (UST) is an unregistered trade union in Equatorial Guinea. The Government has refused to register the UST, and it cannot operate openly in the country.
