= General Union of Workers of Niger =

UGTN
- General Union of Workers of Niger
- Union Général des Travailleurs Nigériens
- Founded: 2002
- Location: Niger

The General Union of Workers of Niger (Union Général des Travailleurs Nigériens, UGTN) is a trade union in Niger, formed in 2002 as a breakaway from the Union of Workers' Trade Unions of Niger.

== See also ==
- Trade unions in Niger
