= Maharashtra Sugarcane Cutting and Transport Workers Union =

Trade union in India

MSCTWU
- Maharashtra Sugarcane Cutting and Transport Workers' Union
- Location: India
- Key people: Dr D. L. Karad, President.
- Affiliations: Centre of Indian Trade Unions

Maharashtra Sugarcane Cutting and Transport Workers Union (SITU), a trade union at the sugarfields of Maharashtra, India. SITU as it is known, is affiliated to the Centre of Indian Trade Unions. The president of the union is D.L. Karad.

In December 2023, after a series of meetings with the sugarcane mill owners, the Union resorted to 'stop cutting' to demand increase in the commission for the labourers involved in sugarcane cutting. The general secretary of the Union, Subhash Jadhav alleged that the state sugar federation and the state government are silent about the issue resulting in this action.

The 2024 general election was announced to be held after the sugarcane harvesting season which leave about 12 lakh labours, most of whom are migrants, away from their native voting paces. These sugarcane cutters are from Marathwada, North Maharashtra and Vidarbha, who may miss voting as a result, Jeewan Rathod, the president of the association, said. A petition was filed in the Aurangabad high court bench requesting the Election Commission of India to arrange for migrating labourers to vote.

Earlier in October 2020, DL Karad led a protest demanding the Maharashtra State Cooperative Sugar Factories Federation (MSCSFF) to announce a hike in the wages of sugarcane cutters from Rs. 239 to Rs.400.
