= NLC Workers Progressive Union =

N.L.C.W.P.U.
- Neyveli Lignite Corporation Workers' Progressive Union
- Region served: India
- Key people: S. Dhandapani (President)
- Affiliations: Labour Progressive Federation

NLC Workers Progressive Union, a trade union amongst miners employed at the Neyveli Lignite Corporation, in Tamil Nadu, India. NLCWPU is affiliated to the Labour Progressive Federation. The president of NLCWPU is S. Dhandapani.
