= National Union of Government Employees =

In 1957 the National Union of Government Employees (NUGE), a former trade union in Trinidad and Tobago, was formed as a result of a merger between the Industrial and Railway Employees Trade Union, the Government Farm and Nursery Workers Trade Union and the Works and Hydraulics Industrial Workers Union. Later that same year, the Communication Services and General Workers Trade Union transferred its daily paid members to the NUGE and were followed in 1959 by the Public Works and Public Service Workers Trade Union.

The Union subsequently merged in 1967 with the Federated Workers Trade Union to form the National Union of Government and Federated Workers.

== See also ==
- List of trade unions
- Nathaniel Crichlow
