= Kerala Gazetted Officers' Federation =

Trade union in India

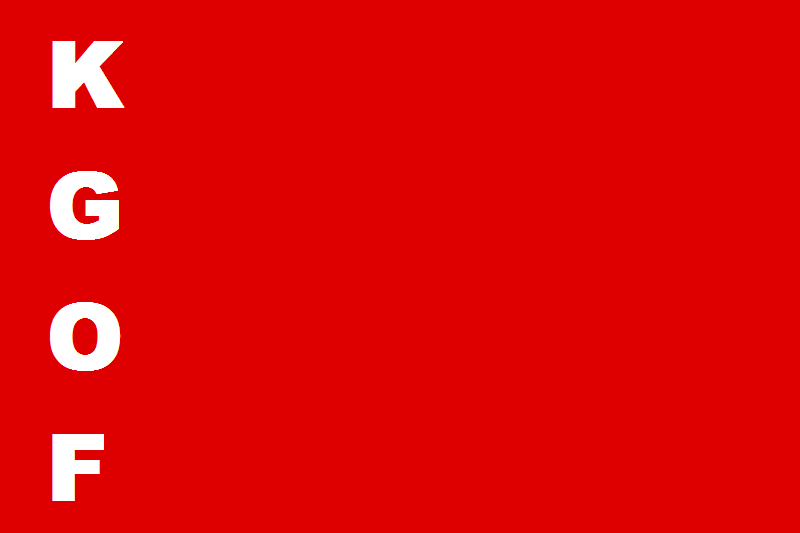
KGOF flag

Kerala Gazetted Officers' Federation is an organization of government employees in Kerala, India. It is politically connected to the Communist Party of India.

As of 2024 the General Secretary of KGOF was Dr. V.M. Harris and the State President was K.S. Sajikumar.
