= Telecommunications Employees and Staff Association =

Trade union at Mauritius Telecom

TESA
- Telecommunications Employees and Staff Association
- Location: Mauritius
- Key people: Suraj Ray, President
- Affiliations: UNI

The Telecommunications Employees and Staff Association (TESA) is a trade union which mostly represents white collar workers in senior administration at Mauritius Telecom.

In October 2017, TESA along with the Mauritius Telecom Employees Association (MTEA) and the Telecommunications Workers Union (TWU), signed a new collective agreement with Mauritius Telecom for the period 2016-20. The agreement included salary increases of up to 10% backdated to July 2016 and improvements in annual leave entitlements.

In May 2019, TESA representatives criticised the coverage of Mauritius Telecom by the newspaper L'Express as focussing too heavily on negatives and failing to report positive developments.
