= National Trade Union Promyana =

NTU Promyana
- National Trade Union Promyana
- Headquarters: Sofia, Bulgaria
- Location: Bulgaria
- Key people: Pancho Mutafchiev, president
- Affiliations: ITUC
- Website: www.promyana-bg.org

The National Trade Union Promyana is a trade union centre in Bulgaria.

It is affiliated with the International Trade Union Confederation.
