= Confederation des Travailleurs Haïtiens =

CTH
- Confederation des Travailleurs Haïtiens
- Founded: 1998
- Headquarters: Port-au-Prince, Haiti
- Location: Haiti
- Members: 110,000
- Affiliations: ITUC

The Confederation des Travailleurs Haïtiens (CTH) was founded in 1998 to provide a space for Haitian workers to organize collectively and promote a progressive agenda, such as opposing the privatization plans of international financial institutions. Trade unionists of the CTH are based in numerous professions, such as education, artisan work, informal sector, port authority, transportation, and as pastors working in rural areas with church coalitions. They have two offices in Port-au-Prince and one office in each of Haiti's ten departments.

Today the CTH is working on organizing in various sectors such as the ports, garment industry, economic development projects, educational programs, health programs, and a wide variety of worker advocacy. The CTH has a membership of 110,000 workers and runs its headquarters out of Port-au-Prince, Haiti. CTH is a member of CLAT (Central Latinoamericana de Trabajadores), CTC (Consejo de Trabajadores del Caribe), and the ITUC (International Trade Union Confederation).

== Foreign destabilization ==
In February 2004, Haiti's constitutionally elected government was overthrown. Following these events the situation for workers in Haiti deteriorated. During this time members of CTH came under increasing persecution and threats. The SAP (Structural Adjustment Program) of the neo-liberal policies of the World Bank and International Monetary Fund, who supported for years a government aid embargo, caused CTH programs, especially in health, to lose funding. The neo-liberal philosophy is that “wasteful” government programs must be tightened up and private agencies should provide such services. The end result is that those who cannot afford services, the majority, go without. CTH supported the efforts of the Jean-Bertrand Aristide government to stand up against privatization (2001–2004).

CTH members have taken a consistently anti-coup stance, calling for the restoration of constitutional democracy during both the de facto periods of 1991-1994 and 2004–2006. In May 2006 René Garcia Préval was inaugurated as president, ending twenty-six months of an illegally imposed interim government.

The CTH is formed of 11 Federations and has three national commissions on women, human rights, and youth:

1. Federation of the Workers of Industry and Subcontracting
2. Federation of the Workers Craftsmen and Professionals; (FEHATRAP)
3. National federation of the agricultural peasants (FENATAPA0)
4. National federation of Workers of press and Communication (FHTP)
5. National federation of the workers of health (FENATRAS)
6. National federation of the workers in education and culture (FENATEC)
7. National federation of the Workers of Construction (FENATCO)
8. Haitian Federation of the Co-operatives and mutual insurance companies of the workers co-operative (FEHCOMTRA)
9. National federation of the sector Commerce (FENASCOM)
10. National federation of the Public Workers of transport
11. National federation of the Workers of tourism (FENADETH)
12. Trade union of the employees of the National Harbor Authority. (SEAPN)
