= Central Amalgamated Workers' Union =

CAWU
- Central Amalgamated Workers' Union
- Headquarters: Petone, New Zealand
- Location: New Zealand

The Central Amalgamated Workers' Union (CAWU) is a trade union in New Zealand. It is one of three autonomous unions, with the Northern Amalgamated Workers' Union, and the Southern Amalgamated Workers' Union, who operate nationally as the Amalgamated Workers' Union (AWUNZ).
