= Coordination Syndicale Haïtienne =

The Coordination Syndicale Haïtienne (CSH) was the primary labor federation that backed the 2004 ousting of Haiti's democratically elected government. Starting in the late 1990s they received financial and technical aid from the ILO, ICFTU, and ORIT. Fritz Charles was the general secretary of CSH during this time. Following the 2004 coup another labor organization that agitated for the government to leave the country, the Batay Ouvriye, was found to be receiving massive funding/support from foreign agencies (AFL-CIOs Solidarity Center).
