= CITYPEG =

Organisation representing Spanish workers in Gibraltar

Círculo de Pensionistas y Trabajadores españoles en Gibraltar
- Abbreviation: CITYPEG
- Type: Trade union
- Region served: Gibraltar
- Chairman: Francisco Ponce

CITYPEG, short for Círculo de Pensionistas y Trabajadores españoles en Gibraltar ('Circle of Spanish Pensioners and Workers in Gibraltar'), is an organisation representing Spanish workers in Gibraltar. It is a rival of ASCTEG ('Socio-Cultural Association of Spanish Workers in Gibraltar'), another organisation representing Spanish workers in the territory.

The chairman of the organisation is Francisco Ponce. He was a member of the Unite District Committee in Gibraltar, but resigned from this post in March 2012 (leaving the District Committee without Spanish representation). Ponce accuses Unite of being reluctant to take actions on behalf of Spanish workers.

CITYPEG has been critical of the policies of the Gibraltarian and Spanish governments for their impact on Spanish workers in the territory. It has characterised the Spanish government's administration of the Gibraltar-Spain border as amounting to using the frontier as "a political weapon", pointing out that long border queues at the Spanish checkpoint affect "Spanish workers in Gibraltar, primarily". It has also complained that the Gibraltar government discriminates against Spanish workers by not topping-up their pensions in the same way as it does for native Gibraltarian workers, and claimed that 500 Spanish workers were laid off in the first half of 2012 as part of an "anti-Spanish policy". The Gibraltar government rejected CITYPEG's claims.

Further claims of discrimination, published in December 2012, led to a libel action against CITYPEG's head Francisco Ponce. After he claimed that Spanish workers had been banned from attending the Gibraltar Joinery and Building Services (GJBS) Christmas party – a claim that was picked up by the Spanish media – he was sued for libel by Gibraltar's Employment Minister Joe Bossano and GJBS. The case was settled in February 2013 when Ponce issued a public apology and agreed to make a symbolic €100 donation to charity.
