= Commercial, Technical and Allied Workers' Union =

Trade union in Saint Vincent and the Grenadines

CTAWU
- Commercial, Technical and Allied Workers' Union
- Headquarters: Kingstown, Saint Vincent and the Grenadines
- Location: Saint Vincent and the Grenadines
- Members: 2000
- Affiliations: ITUC

The Commercial, Technical and Allied Workers' Union (CTAWU) is a trade union in Saint Vincent and the Grenadines. It has a membership of 2000 and is affiliated with the International Trade Union Confederation.
