= Confederación General del Trabajo (Cuba) =

Trade union in Cuba

Confederación General del Trabajo ('General Confederation of Labour', abbreviated CGT) was a trade union in Cuba. It was formed in 1949 through a split in the legally recognized factions of the CTC. The split had its beginnings in the telephone and electricity workers' unions. CGT was led by Angel Cofiño. CGT reunited with the legal CTC after a short period.
