= Independent Christian Trade Unions of Slovakia =

NKOS
- Independent Christian Trade Unions of Slovakia
- Nezávislé kresťanské odbory Slovenska
- Headquarters: Trnava, Slovakia
- Location: Slovakia
- Key people: Ľubica Černá, president
- Affiliations: ITUC
- Website: www.nkos.sk

The Independent Christian Trade Unions of Slovakia (NKOS) is a trade union center in Slovakia. It has a membership of 10,000 in three affiliated unions.

Slovak legislation gives majority unions monopoly power to negotiate and conclude collective agreements. This power has limited the ability of the NKOS to advance in the country.

The NKOS is affiliated with the International Trade Union Confederation.
