= National Workers' Union (Saint Lucia) =

NWU
- National Workers' Union
- Founded: 1973
- Headquarters: Castries, Saint Lucia
- Location: Saint Lucia
- Members: 5,000
- Key people: Tyrone Maynard, president Solace Myers, deputy president general
- Affiliations: IUF, ITF, PSI, UNI, ITUC
- Website: www.nationalworkersunion.org

The National Workers' Union (NWU) is a trade union in Saint Lucia. The NWU originated as a split from the Saint Lucia Workers' Union (SLWU) in 1973 when SLWU executive committee member Tyrone Maynard was removed and subsequently started the NWU.
