= National Council of Unions of the Industrial and Lower Income Group of Government Workers =

MKTR
- National Council of Unions of the Industrial and Lower Income Group of Government Workers
- Majlis Kebangsaan Kesatuan Pekerja-Pekerja Kakitangan Rendah, Kerajaan Malaysia
- Founded: 17 May 1956
- Headquarters: Kuala Lumpur, Malaysia
- Location: Malaysia
- Members: 200,000 (45,000 dues paying)
- Affiliations: ITUC
- Website: web.archive.org/web/20060923212042/http://www.mktr.org:80/

The National Council of Unions of the Industrial and Lower Income Group of Government Workers (MKTR) is a national trade union centre in Malaysia.

The MKTR is a National Labour Centre consisting of twenty-two (22) affiliated national and state unions representing over 200,000 workers in the Lower-income Group, commonly known as category ``C and ``D or Sub-ordinate (Supportive) Groups from the Public Sector. The MKTR has 45,000 dues paying members.

The MKTR is affiliated with the International Trade Union Confederation.

== See also ==
- Trade unions in Malaysia

https://www.bernama.com/bm/news.php?id=1656752

Scams’s alert MKTR

https://sebenarnya.my/terdapat-surat-yang-menggunakan-nama-ketua-pengarah-kerja-raya-bagi-mendapatkan-tajaan-tabung-kebajikan-untuk-kakitangan-kkr-malaysia/
