= Iranian Workers' Solidarity Network =

- IWSN Logo
- Founded: 2000
- Type: Advocacy group
- Purpose: Labor rights, Trade unionism, Human rights
- Location: Global
- Method: Demonstration
- Website: http://www.iwsn.org/

Iranian Workers' Solidarity Network (Persian: شبکه همبستگی کارگری) often abbreviated as IWSN, is an international network of Iranian trade union and workers' right activists. Established in 2001, it currently has chapters in 13 countries around the world.

== See also ==
- Syndicate of Workers of Tehran and Suburbs Bus Company
- Mansour Osanlou

== Resources ==
- About Iranian Workers' Solidarity Network, IWSN website
