= Federation of Bhutanese Trade Unions =

Organization based in Nepal

FOBTU
- Federation of Bhutanese Trade Unions
- Founded: 2001
- Headquarters: Kathmandu, Nepal (Exile)
- Location: Bhutan
- Members: 14 sector unions
- Key people: Nandi K.S. Neopaney, president Nath Timsina, general secretary

The Federation of Bhutanese Trade Unions is a national trade union federation of Bhutan. It was founded in exile in Kathmandu, Nepal in 2001.

According to ICTUR, although it reports having 14 sectorial unions, there is no apparent organized labour activity within Bhutan itself.
