= Socialist Trade Union Centre =

Trade union in India

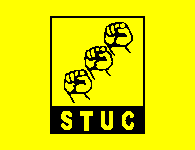
STUC flag

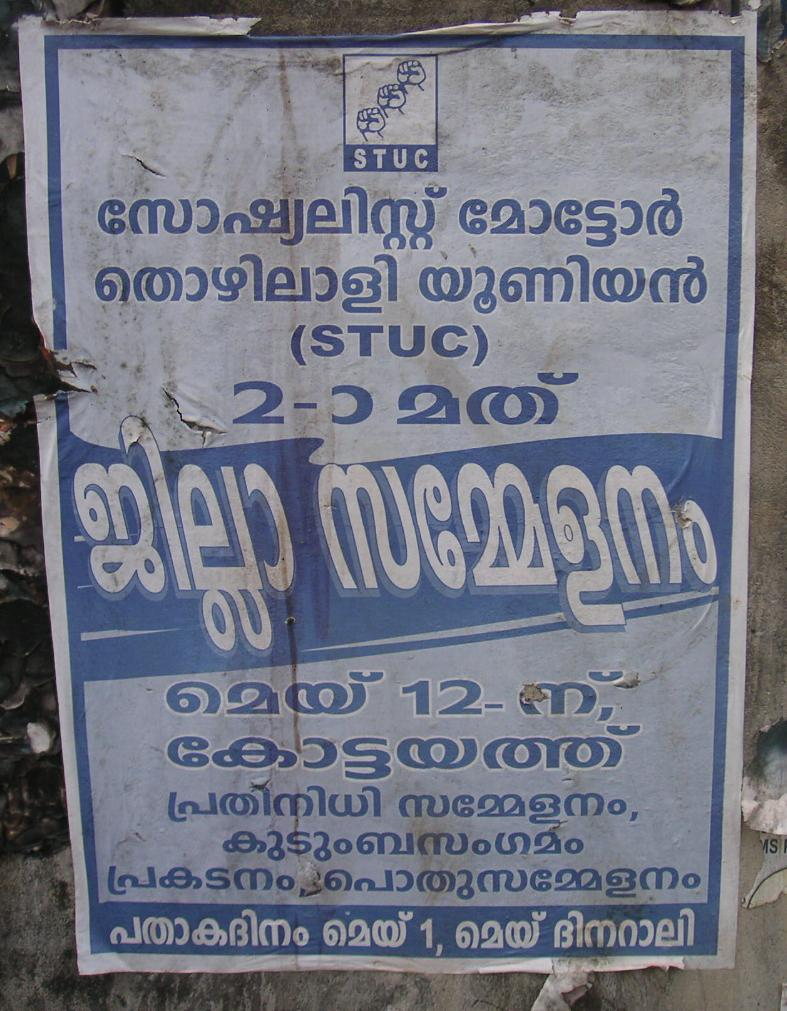
Poster for the 2nd District Conference of the Socialist Motor Thozilali Union

Socialist Trade Union Centre is a trade union federation in Kerala, India. It was started in 2003 by the Sree Narayana Dharma Paripalana, an Ezhava caste-based movement. Its first affiliated union was the Socialist Motor Thozhilali Union, a union of autorickshaw drivers in Kottayam.

The trade union is linked to Sree Naryana Dharma Paripalana Yogam.
