= Cyprus Union of Bank Employees =

ETYK
- Cyprus Union of Bank Employees
- Ενωση Τραπεζικών Υπαλλήλων Κύπρου; Kıbrıs Bankacılar Sendikası
- Founded: 1955
- Headquarters: Nicosia, Cyprus
- Location: Cyprus
- Members: 6700
- Key people: Loizos Hadjicostis, chairman
- Affiliations: UNI
- Website: www.etyk.org.cy

The Cyprus Union of Bank Employees (ETYK) is a trade union centre in Cyprus. It is affiliated with the Union Network International.
