= Association of Employees in Government Educational Administration =

Trade union of Finland

Association of Employees in Government Educational Administration (Finnish: Valtion alueellisen sivistyshallinnon virkamiehet VSV ry, Swedish: Statstjänstemännen inom den regionala bildningsförvaltningen SRB rf) is the smallest of the member trade unions of Confederation of Unions for Academic Professionals in Finland with 141 members. The union consists of civil servants working in the educational sector of the provincial boards. The union was founded in the early 20th century as the association of the Finnish school superintendents.
