= Union of Commercial and Industrial Workers =

Trade union

UCIW
- Union of Commercial and Industrial Workers
- Headquarters: Laventille, Trinidad and Tobago
- Location: Trinidad and Tobago
- Members: Approx 800 (2007)
- Key people: Kelvin Gonzales, President

The Union of Commercial and Industrial Workers is a trade union in Trinidad and Tobago which was once one of the major unions organising shop workers. It has since diminished in both size and significance.

== See also ==
- List of trade unions
