= Lal Bahini =

Left-wing militia

Lal Bahini Red Army
- লাল বাহিনী
- Other name: Red horses (Note: by Sheikh Mujibur Rahman)
- Leader: Abdul Mannan
- Dates active: March 1972 – August 15, 1975
- Country: Bangladesh
- Allegiance: Sheikh Mujibur Rahman
- Ideology: Mujibism; Vanguardism
- Part of: Bangladesh Jatiya Sramik League

Lal Bahini (Bengali: লাল বাহিনী, lit. 'Red Army'), was the paramilitary wing of the Awami League's trade union, Bangladesh Jatiya Sramik League, that was active from 1972 to 1975 until the Assassination of Sheikh Mujibur Rahman on August 15, 1975. Lal Bahini was headed by Bangladesh Jatiya Sramik League president Abdul Mannan. The force was basically a vanguard of the then Bangladesh Awami League and was used to suppress uprising among the workers.

The actual date of the formation of the force is unknown. This wing of Bangladesh Jatiya Sramik League was never recognized by the government as an official force, but in a public speech, Sheikh Mujibur Rahman called them his Red Horses.

Lal Bahini was dreaded for its ruthlessness in suppressing labor protests in the industrial areas of the country including Tejgaon, Tongi, Adamjee, Kalurghat etc. as well as for fueling riots in the industrial areas. Lal Bahini, Jatiya Rakkhi Bahini and Shecchashebak Bahini formed an unholy nexus during the Sheikh Mujib regime. Lal Bahini is responsible for hundreds of riots that took place in three years that claimed thousands of lives.

== Background ==
Bangladesh became independent after a nine-month-long Independence war of Bangladesh. After the return of Sheikh Mujibur Rahman on January 10, 1972, he directed to draft a constitution for the country which was adopted with four fundamental principles of state policy: Democracy, Socialism, Bengali Nationalism and Secularism on November 4 of the same year. These four state policies are called Mujibism all together.

The Awami League, which claimed to have been committed to establish a socialist economic structure, on March 25 nationalized all the banks, insurance, factories and mills which were previously taken over by the government after the enactment of Acting President Order 1. Almost 80 to 85 percent industries of the country came under the effective control of the government.

As a result of the acquisition of the industries, along with the administrative power the government also got the responsibility of the welfare of the labors who have been working in those industries. This made the Awami League's labor wing to be more dominative than ever. Under government support Bangladesh Jatio Sramik League soon became a major force in politics and formed the voluntary force Lal Bahini that started working from 1972.

== Ideology ==
Although Lal Bahini members had a little headache about the ideology and it was primarily formed to wipe out opposition forces from the industrial areas around the country, the public speeches of its leadership and its activities during the regime indicate that the force may have been considered themselves as revolutionary vanguards indeed and actually adopted Vanguardism as its ideology. In the context of Marxist revolutionary struggle, Vanguardism professes the idea, that only one party can truly represent working class. After the October Revolution, Bolsheviks played the role of being the representative of working class.

Lal Bahini aimed at ensuring only one representative of the working class which would be the Bangladesh Jatio Sramik League. It was neither the largest nor the most popular labor organizations of the country.

After the 1973 election, in which Bangladesh Awami League won a decisive victory, the labor front launched a campaign to drive out all other trade union leaders and workers from the industrial areas of the country. According to the Bangladesh Jatio Sramik League leaders:

In view of the fact that the Awami League had won a total victory and since the industries were nationalized for the benefits of working class and the government was establishing a social economy, so there is no need of any other trade union.

In addition after the industries were nationalized, in March 1972, the Lal Bahini chief Abdul Mannan declared that the force was created to help the government to establish socialism and economic emancipation of the working class.

Moreover, Lal Bahini men were motivated by the anti-American speeches, which made them to build an anti-American mindset. On May 3, 1973, leaders of Bangladesh Jatio Sramik League and Sheikh Fazlul Huq Moni accused Jute Mills Corporation chairman of "smuggling out jute to agents of US imperialism, Zionism and Pakistani capitalists sitting in New York".

Bangladesh Textile Workers League, a wing of the parent organization of Lal Bahini, requested for aid from the United States of America in an application signed by its General Secretary Mahbubul Alam on May 16, 1973.

== Formation ==
The exact date and time of the formation of Lal Bahini could not be determined since it was entirely a voluntary force backed by the ruling party and there was no certain table of organization of establishment for the force.

Abdul Mannan who was the head of Bangladesh Jatio Sramik League seemed to have orchestrated the formation of the force. After the resignation of two powerful labor leader Mohammad Shahjahan and Ruhul Amin Bhuiyan from the organization, Abdul Mannan tightened the grip as he became not only the all-in-all of the labor group but also the only one in the organization.

Lal Bahini, to eliminate their political opposition, whom they used to describe as 'bad elements', from the industrial hubs, launched a purification drive from March 1972 after the policy to nationalize the industries was declared. Lal Bahini leaders openly declared crusades against the organizations those were, according to them, involved in anti-government protests backed by United States of America.

In a public meeting that took place in December 1972, extending his support for the purification drive of Lal Bahini, Sheikh Mujibur Rahman threatened to deploy his 'red horses' to finish off the so-called exploiters.

== Rivalry ==
Bangladesh Jatio Sramik League had developed rivalries with almost all other labor wings of the country during the regime but it got a fresh blow after the formation of Jatiyo Samajtantrik Dal (Jasad) on October 31, 1972.

Of the most influential trio of the Bangladesh Jatio Sramik League, Mohammad Shahjahan and Ruhul Amin Bhuiyan left the organization in support of the newly formed Jasad with their thousands of followers in December that apparently compelled the only leader left in the organization Abdul Mannan to reorganize the organization.

Mohammad Shahjahan and Ruhul Amin Bhuiyan formed a new labor front of Jasad. From the beginning, Bangladesh Jatio Sramik League had rivalries with the Jasad supported Jatiyo Sramik League and even Abdul Mannan of Bangladesh Jatio Sramik League was found saying, "if the new front pronounce a single word against Mujibism I will cut off their tongue".

Moreover, the Bangladesh Jatio Sramik League in many of the industrial areas failed to create a strong support base due to the influence of left-wing Bangladesh Sramik Federation over the labors working there. Bangladesh Trade Union Kendra (Center) BTUK which was backed by the Communist Party of Bangladesh also had influence over the working class.

== Atrocities ==
=== Mongla Port massacre ===
The first ever atrocity initiated by Lal Bahini took place in the port of Khulna which is popularly known as Mongla Port where thousands of workers used to work as porters. It was assumed that the massacre might have occurred as a result of the competition for establishing dominance over the porters between left wing labor fronts and the Bangladesh Jatio Sramik League.

The massacre escalated from a riot that was ensued in March 1972, among the two groups- Lal Bahini and the leftist laborers. The massacre started when the police got involved in favor of Lal Bahini to wipe out the opposing labors. As a result of the confrontation according to the official statement of the government, some 36 labourers were killed.

But the actual toll was far bigger than the number stated by the government. According to prominent journalist Anthony Mascarenhas who was in Bangladesh during the riot, some 2,000 people were killed that day and the leftists labor wings who dared to confront the armed to teeth Lal Bahini men paid the toll.

=== Tongi violence ===
Another incident was the April 5 attack by Lal Bahini men on Bangladesh Sramik Federation workers in Tongi industrial area. The attack was aimed at the end of the influence of NAP (Bhashani) supported federation workers in Tongi who were the largest among the labor organizations of Bangladesh during those days.

Workers who supported the Bangladesh Sramik Federation were assaulted, and an unknown number killed, in an attack by armed cadres of the Lal Bahini. After law and order was restored, victims went to Dhaka, and met the Prime Minister to protest. Sheikh Mujibur Rahman assured them that justice would be done, but nothing happened. The Lal Bahini reiterated their determination to expel the "wrong type of trade unionists" from the country's industries.

=== Riots in Chittagong ===
The Lal Bahini was directly responsible for the riots in the Kalurghat industrial area and the R.R. Jute and Textiles Mill of Chittagong. The prime reason behind these riots was the 'local and non-local issue' and the 'districtism' which was introduced by the Lal Bahini men and was used to divide the workers.

Since Chittagong was a port city and was an industrial hub, many workers had to come Chittagong in search of work from the other districts. They were working for years in those factories and contributed to the production of the factories.

During May 1973, the Lal Bahini members initiated a purification campaign using the local-non local issue. Workers, who were not from Chittagong were killed en masse in the riots. Hundreds of workers were slaughtered and the survivors fled to other districts for life. Factories were closed.

A number of riots ensued eventually and the production of the mills significantly declined. Prior to these riots Sheikh Moni and Abdul Mannan addressed their followers and Lal Bahini contingents and alleged that the jutes were smuggled to imperialists by some agents. They had pledged a purification movement.

The increasing number of riots created a tension among the government and the Finance Minister Tajuddin Ahmed in a press conference on May 12 said that the production is harshly declining and the economy is on the point of collapse. He called for tighter labor discipline in factories and all out efforts to increase production.

=== Fazlur Rahman abduction ===
Lal Bahini chief Abdul Mannan on April 30, 1973, sent his henchmen to raid the home of Ahmed Fazlur Rahman, who was a co-accused, with Sheikh Mujibur Rahman, in the Agartala Conspiracy Case. He owned a small chain of petrol stations and other small-scale businesses. The Lal Bahini abducted him and took him to the Sramik League office. There he was harshly interrogated about the source of his income and property. Once Sheikh Mujib came to know about the abduction, he ordered Mannan to let Fazlur Rahman go. After Mannan complied, Sheikh Mujib assured Fazlur Rahman that suitable steps would be taken against Mannan, but he remained at liberty until arrested in January 1975 for misappropriation of funds.
