= Danish Association of Chartered Surveyors =

Trade union in Denmark

DdL
- Danish Association of Chartered Surveyors
- Den danske Landinspektørforening
- Founded: August 1875
- Headquarters: København, Denmark
- Location: Denmark
- Members: 1400
- Key people: Henning Elmstrøm, president
- Affiliations: None

The Danish Association of Chartered Surveyors is a trade union in Denmark. It has a membership of 1400.
