= Otis Elevators Employees Union =

Trade union of elevator installers and repairers in India

OEEU
- Otis Elevators Employees Union
- Founded: 1961
- Location: India
- Members: 490
- Affiliations: CITU

The Otis Elevators Employees Union (OEEU) is a trade union of elevator installers and repairers at the Otis company's Indian subsidiary in Maharashtra state. OEEU was founded in 1961 and is affiliated with the Centre of Indian Trade Unions.

== History ==
The OEEU was founded in 1961.

Throughout the 1980s, the Mumbai committee of OEEU had grown increasingly close with Otis management, until a group of militant young workers won the union elections in 1990.

In 1991, an increase in workplace accidents led to workers giving press interviews and forming an India-wide federation. In response, Otis stopped the payment of some wages and filed charges against workers.

In 1992, an Otis trainee died on the job due to orders to violate workplace safety protocols. OEEU organised protests in response, forcing the company to permanently take on 98 temporary workers and to stop their recruitment for permanent jobs. This had been a problem for several years at that point. In that year, Otis signed a bargaining agreement with rival union Bharatiya Kamgar Sena (BKS), giving management free hand. On February 2, 1994, BKS members attacked protesting workers inside the factory, after which Otis locked out all workers not willing to accept the bargaining agreement until the end of 1994. During the lockout, Otis increasingly employed unskilled contract workers to service maintenance contracts, leading to several accidents, including a fatal one, in 1994. During this time, OEEU organised temporary workers and workers coming from Mumbai's outskirts.

In 1998, two Otis workers died on the job in separate incidents in Mumbai. This led to a public discussion about the lack of safety training for contract workers at the company and an investigation by Lokhshahi Hakk Sanghatana, which demanded that company management should be prosecuted for their negligence. In another report from 2001, the organisation found that five Otis subcontractors had died on the job over the preceding two years.
