= Independent Union of Maritime and Related Workers =

SIMA
- Independent Union of Maritime and Related Workers
- Sindicato Independente dos Marítimos de Angola
- Location: Angola
- Affiliations: ITF

The Independent Union of Maritime and Related Workers (SIMA) is a small, independent trade union centre of Angola.
