= Steel Plant Employees Union =

Trade union in India

S.P.E.U.
- Location: India
- Key people: V. Dhanaraju
- Affiliations: Centre of Indian Trade Unions

The Steel Plant Employees Union (SPEU) is a trade union at the Visakhapatnam Steel Plant in Visakhapatnam, India. SPEU is affiliated to the Centre of Indian Trade Unions. The SPEU general secretary is V. Dhanaraju.
