= Darjeeling District Newspaper Sellers' Union =

Trade union in India

Darjeeling District Newspaper Sellers' Union was a trade union of newspaper sellers in the Darjeeling District, West Bengal, India. DDNSU was affiliated to the Centre of Indian Trade Unions. The union president was Nantu Paul.
