= Danish Association of Lawyers and Economists =

The Danish Association of Lawyers and Economists (Danish: Djøf, which used to be an acronym but is not anymore) is a trade union/labour union with 100,000 members. Apart from lawyers and economists the association organises graduates and students from social sciences and business economics. Employers and managers are also eligible for membership as are self-employed lawyers. Members work in law, economy, administration, management, research, teaching, communication etc. in both the public and private sector. Danish Association of Lawyers and Economists is part of the Danish Confederation of Professional Associations (AC), the Danish umbrella organisation for academics.

== History ==
In 1993, the union organization published guidelines for ethical conduct of its members with respect to public administration.

In 2005, the organization had about 20,000 members.

== Publishing ==
The association has an independent publishing company called DJØF Publishing. Each year about 150 titles are published about law, economics and other social sciences. An increasing number of the titles are in English. The association also produces a fortnightly journalistic trade magazine called Djøfbladet, which is sent to all 80,000 members. The magazine has a total of 102,000 readers.

== Pension fund ==
An independent pension fund is affiliated with the association. It's called Juristernes og Økonomernes Pensionskasse (JØP). In 2012 it had 48.000 members and a total valuation of about DKK 54 billions.

== Continuing education ==
The association offers courses about law, economics, management, communications etc. as a means of continuing education for both members and non-members. The organization also sponsors student competitions, and researches and reports about employment issues.
