= Saint Lucia Workers' Union =

SLWU
- Saint Lucia Workers' Union
- Founded: 1939
- Headquarters: Castries, Saint Lucia
- Location: Saint Lucia
- Affiliations: ITUC

The Saint Lucia Workers' Union (SLWU) is a general trade union in Saint Lucia and the first union in the country.

Originally founded in 1939 as the Saint Lucia Workers' Co-operative Union, the union was renamed in 1956. Many of St Lucia's political parties have emerged from the union.

By the late 1960s, the SLWU claimed 2,500 members.
