= Southern Amalgamated Workers' Union =

New Zealand trade union

AWUNZ
- Southern Amalgamated Workers' Union
- Headquarters: Christchurch, New Zealand
- Location: New Zealand
- Affiliations: NZCTU
- Website: www.awunz.org.nz

The Southern Amalgamated Workers' Union (AWUNZ) is a trade union in New Zealand. It is one of three autonomous unions, with the Northern Amalgamated Workers' Union, and the Central Amalgamated Workers' Union, who operate nationally as the Amalgamated Workers' Union.

The AWUNZ is a member of the New Zealand Council of Trade Unions.
