= National Workers Union (Trinidad & Tobago) =

NWU
- National Workers Union
- Founded: 15 October 2004
- Headquarters: 43 Fifth Street, Barataria, San Juan
- Location: Trinidad and Tobago
- Key people: Dave Smith, President; Carla Walcott, General Secretary
- Website: www.workersunion.org.tt

The National Workers Union is a trade union in Trinidad and Tobago. The Union was formed on 15 October 2004 and is registered with the Registrar of Trade Unions (Reg No. 501).

The NWU is a general union which specialises in representing workers from non-unionised workplaces and represents workers in bilateral meetings with employers through the Ministry of Labour to the Industrial Court.

The Union has two bargaining units at Twin Island Shipping and National Petroleum.

== See also ==
- List of trade unions
