= Confederation of Trade Unions of the Republika Srpska =

Trade union centre in Bosnia and Herzegovina

SSRS
- Confederation of Trade Unions of the Republika Srpska
- Savez Sindikata Republike Srpske
- Founded: August 1992
- Headquarters: Banja Luka, Republika Srpska
- Location: Bosnia and Herzegovina
- Members: 190,000
- Key people: Cedo Volas, president

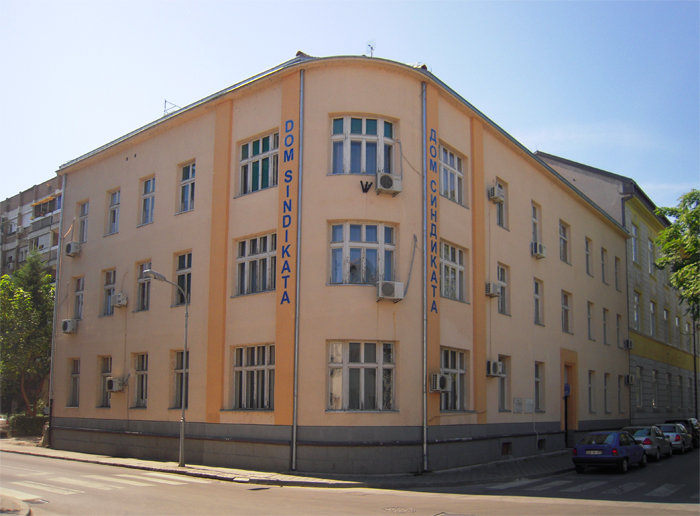
Trade Union Headquarters in Banja Luka

The Confederation of Trade Unions of the Republika Srpska (SSRS) is a trade union centre in Republika Srpska, in Bosnia and Herzegovina. It was founded in August 1992 and claims a membership of 190,000.
