= Lesotho Trade Union Congress =

LTUC
- Lesotho Trade Union Congress
- Founded: 1971
- Headquarters: Maseru, Lesotho
- Location: Lesotho
- Members: 3000
- Key people: Martha Mosoang, general secretary

The Lesotho Trade Union Congress (LTUC) is a national trade union center in Lesotho. The organisation was first established in 1971. The group's secretary general, Moletsane Jonathan is a veteran leader of pro-BNP labour federations.

The group supported a protest march against the Public Service Bill in 1995.
