= Union of Djibouti Workers =

UDT
- Union of Djibouti Workers
- Union Djiboutienne du Travail
- Founded: 1992
- Headquarters: Djibouti City, Djibouti
- Location: Djibouti
- Key people: Adan Mohamed Abdou, general secretary Hassan Cher Hared, International relation secretary
- Affiliations: ITUC
- Website: www.udt-dj.org

The Union of Djibouti Workers (UDT) - in French: Union djiboutienne du travail - is a trade union centre in Djibouti. It was founded in 1992, and is affiliated with the International Trade Union Confederation (ITUC).

== Government/union conflict ==
ICTUR reports ongoing harassment and police violence against union activities in Djibouti.

Harowo.com reported the arrest of two members of the UDT on March 11, 2006. General secretary Aden Mohamed Abdou, and Hassan Cher Hared, International Relations Secretary, were arrested and

taken to the premises of the Criminal Brigade without being presented with any form of warrant. According to the information received, the two trade union leaders were brought before an examining magistrate for questioning, charged with “supplying information to a foreign power” (Articles 137 and 139 of Djibouti’s Penal Code) and then committed to the civil prison of Gabode. They have not had access to a lawyer or a doctor.

ICFTU reported on the arrest of two union leaders on February 20, 2006.

Mohamed Ahmed Mohamed, the Legal Affairs Officer of the Union of Port Workers which is a member of an ICFTU affiliate, the Union Djiboutienne du Travail (UDT), and Djibril Ismael Egueh, the General Secretary of MTS, which is also an ICFTU affiliate, were arrested on 20 February. They were both on their way back from a training session on rural cooperatives organised and delivered by the International Institute of Histadrut, the ICFTU’s affiliate in Israel.
