= Northern Amalgamated Workers' Union =

Trade union in New Zealand

AWUNZ
- Northern Amalgamated Workers' Union
- Headquarters: Auckland, New Zealand
- Location: New Zealand
- Key people: Maurice Davis, secretary
- Website: www.awunz.org.nz

The Northern Amalgamated Workers' Union (AWUNZ) is a trade union in New Zealand. It is one of three autonomous unions, with the Southern Amalgamated Workers' Union, and the Central Amalgamated Workers' Union, who operate nationally as the Amalgamated Workers' Union.

The first iteration of the Union that was to become AWUNZ entered NZ history in 1886 when the newly formed Amalgamated Shearers Union of Australasia sent three organisers to New Zealand to enrol members and set up branches. Membership in the first year stood at 2300.

Over the years the membership of the Union has evolved and with that came a number of name changes.The Amalgamated Shearer’s Union of Australasia became in NZ the Workers Union. While holding a national character and loose federation, this organisation devolved to a regional level with three main local branches becoming the key decision making bodies for their membership. These branches worked together and had a strong history of working with the Labourers Union and the Miners Union.

The election of the National government in 1990 cut unemployed and other benefits by up to 25%. Over $1 billion taken from beneficiaries and the Employment Contracts Act effectively wrote Unions out of NZ’s employment legislation. This was seen on the NZ left as an all-out assault on the lives and conditions of working class New Zealanders. All Unions in NZ faced a struggle to survive and one of the results was many smaller Unions amalgamated in order to do so.

The NZ Workers' Union voted themselves out of existence and amalgamated with the NZ Labourers' Union. This was renamed the Amalgamated Workers' Union of New Zealand (AWUNZ). Shortly afterwards, when the true financial position of the NZ Workers' Union became evident, the decision was taken to adopt three branch structure and to become three autonomous unions (Northern, Central, and Southern) operating nationally under the AWUNZ Federation in order to cut costs. This structure remained until the process began to pull the three cooperating bodies together into a cohesive National Union under Maurice Davis in 2022.

Inclusion has always been a cornerstone of the principles of the Union. Women received the vote in NZ in 1893 and in 1894 Mrs Aileen Garmson as secretary of the Christchurch branch of the Workers' Union. At its inception (as The Amalgamated Shearer’s Union do Australasia) the Union made special efforts to recruit Maori members, who were highly represented in the shearing industry (the rules were even printed in Maori).
