= National Workers' Movement (St. Vincent) =

NWM
- NWM Solutions
- Headquarters: Kingstown, Saint Vincent and the Grenadines
- Location: England
- Key people: Noel Jackson, general secretary
- Affiliations: ITUC

The National Workers' Movement (NWM) is a trade union in Saint Vincent and the Grenadines. It is affiliated with the International Trade Union Confederation.
