= Consejo Coordinador Argentino Sindical =

CCAS
- Consejo Coordinador Argentino Sindical
- Headquarters: Buenos Aires, Argentina
- Location: Argentina
- Key people: Victor R. Huerta, secretary general
- Affiliations: ITUC

The Consejo Coordinador Argentino Sindical (CCAS) is a National trade union center of Argentina. It is led by Victor R. Huerta.

The CCAS is affiliated to the International Trade Union Confederation.
