= Batay Ouvriye =

Haitian workers movement

- May 1st - Workers' Struggle Federation
- Intersyndicale Premier Mai - Batay Ouvriye
- Founded: 1996
- Headquarters: Port-au-Prince, Haiti
- Location: Haiti
- Website: www.batayouvriye.org

Batay Ouvriye is a national workers' movement in Haiti known to be active since 1994.
