= Long-range identification and tracking =

System for global identification and tracking of ships

The long-range identification and tracking (LRIT) of ships was established as an international system on 19 May 2006 by the International Maritime Organization (IMO) as resolution MSC.202 (81). This resolution amends Chapter V of the International Convention for the Safety of Life at Sea (SOLAS), regulation 19-1 and binds all governments which have contracted to the IMO.

The LRIT regulation will apply to the following ship types engaged on international voyages:

- All passenger ships including high-speed craft,
- Cargo ships, including high-speed craft of 300 gross tonnage and above, and
- Mobile offshore drilling units.

These ships must report their position to their flag administration at least four times a day. Most vessels set their existing satellite communications systems to automatically make these reports. Other contracting governments may request information about vessels in which they have a legitimate interest under the regulation.

The LRIT system consists of the already installed (generally) shipborne satellite communications equipment, communications service providers (CSPs), application service providers (ASPs), LRIT data centres, the LRIT data distribution plan and the International LRIT data exchange. Certain aspects of the performance of the LRIT system are reviewed or audited by the LRIT coordinator acting on behalf of the IMO and its contracting governments.

Some confuse the functions of LRIT with that of AIS (Automatic Identification System), an automatic vessel information display system also mandated by the IMO, which operates in the VHF radio band, with a range only slightly greater than line-of-sight. While AIS was originally designed for short-range operation as a vessel information display system and navigational aid, it has now been shown to be possible to receive AIS signals by satellite in many, but not all, parts of the world. This is becoming known as S-AIS and is completely different from LRIT. The only similarity is that AIS is also collected from space for determining location of vessels, but requires no action from the vessels themselves except they must have their AIS system turned on. LRIT requires the active, willing participation of the vessel involved, which is, in and of itself, a very useful indication as to whether the vessel in question is a lawful actor. Thus the information collected from the two systems, S-AIS and LRIT, are mutually complementary, and S-AIS clearly does not make LRIT superfluous in any manner. Indeed, because of co-channel interference near densely populated or congested sea areas, satellites are having a difficult time in detecting AIS from space in those areas. Fixes are under development by several organizations, but how effective they will be remains to be seen.

== European implementation ==
Following the EU Council Resolution of 2 October 2007, EU Member States (MS) decided to establish an EU LRIT Data Centre (EU LRIT DC). According to the Council Resolution, the Commission is in charge of managing the EU LRIT DC, in cooperation with Member States, through the European Maritime Safety Agency (EMSA). The Agency, in particular, is in charge of the technical development, operation and maintenance of the EU LRIT DC. It also “stresses that the objective of the EU LRIT DC should include maritime security, Search and Rescue (SAR), maritime safety and protection of the marine environment, taking into consideration respective developments within the IMO context.”

== North American implementation ==
=== Canada ===
In January 2009, Canada became one of the first SOLAS contracting governments to implement a national data centre and comply with the LRIT regulation.

=== United States ===
In January 2009, the United States became one of the first SOLAS contracting governments to implement a National Data Centre and comply with the LRIT regulation. Currently the US Authorized Application Service Provider (ASP) is Pole Star Space Applications Ltd..

LRIT was proposed by the United States Coast Guard (USCG) at the International Maritime Organization (IMO) in London during the aftermath of the September 11, 2001, attacks to track the approximately 50,000 large ships around the world.

In the United States integration of LRIT information with that from sensors and enables the Coast Guard to correlate Long Range Identification and Tracking (LRIT) data with data from other sources, detect anomalies, and heighten overall Maritime Domain Awareness (MDA). The United States implementation of this regulation is consistent with the Coast Guard's strategic goals of maritime security and maritime safety, and the Department's strategic goals of awareness, prevention, protection, and response.

Every sovereign nation already has the right to request such information (and does so) for ships destined for their ports. The LRIT regulation and computer system will allow the USCG to receive information about all vessels within 1,000 nautical miles (1,900 km) of US territory providing the vessel's flag administration has not excluded the US from receiving such information.

For a more detailed description of the United States implementation of the LRIT system, please refer to the NPRM published October 3, 2007, in the US Government Federal Register (72 FR 56600).

=== Marshall Islands ===
Marshall Islands, one of the largest ship registries in the world, established one of the first prototype Data Centres, using Pole Star Space Applications.

== African States ==
Several African states have formed a LRIT Cooperative Data Centre. South Africa National Data Centre provides services to a number of African states, including Ghana and the Gambia.

=== Liberia ===
Liberia, the second largest ship registry in the world has established a LRIT Data Centre in 2008. The Recognised LRIT provider is Pole Star Space Applications.

== South American implementation ==
=== Brazil ===
In January 2009 Brazil implemented a National Data Centre and was one of the first SOLAS contracting governments to become compliant with the LRIT regulation. And in August 11th 2010 implemented the Regional LRIT Data Centre Brazil, providing services for Brazil and Uruguay. In 2014, RDC BRAZIL providing services for Namibia.

=== Venezuela ===
The Venezuelan flag registry appointed Fulcrum Maritime Systems as the sole LRIT application service provider (ASP) and national data center (NDC) provider for all Venezuelan flagged vessels.

=== Chile ===
The Chilean flag registry appointed Collecte Localisation Satellites (CLS) as the sole LRIT application service provider (ASP). This Data Center provides services for all Chilean and Mexican flagged vessels.

=== Ecuador ===
The Republic of Ecuador entered in LRIT production environment at April 15 of 2010. Ecuador owns a National LRIT Data Center (NDC) and recognize their Maritime Authority as Application Service Provider (ASP).

=== Honduras ===
Honduras Flag appointed Pole Star Space Applications as ASP.

=== Panama ===
The Panama Flag Registry appointed the Pole Star Space Applications, Inc. / Absolute Maritime Tracking Services Inc. consortium as the sole LRIT Application Service Provider (ASP) and National Data Center (NDC) provider for all Panama flagged vessels. It is widely considered to be the world’s largest vessel monitoring centre, consisting of over 8,000 SOLAS ships and small-craft. The National Data Centre is based in Panama City, and operates on a 24 x 7 x 365 basis. Panama is the first flag administration to implement such a broad range of Maritime Domain Awareness (MDA) capabilities under a single LRIT service provision, which also includes advanced small-craft monitoring, vessel vetting and sanctions compliance, port-risk mitigation, and fleet-wide Ship Security Alert Service (SSAS) management - including testing, response escalation and notifications.

== Pacific Ocean implementation ==
=== Vanuatu ===
The Vanuatu flag registry appointed Collect Localisation Satellites (CLS) as the sole LRIT application service provider (ASP) and national data center (RDC) provider for all Vanuatu flagged vessels.

=== Singapore implementation ===
Singapore established its LRIT National Data Centre with CLS as its LRIT Recognised ASP.

=== Vietnam implementation ===
Vietnam entered in LRIT production environment at October 21 of 2013. Vietnam owns a National LRIT Data Center (NDC) and recognizes VISHIPEL as Application Service Provider (ASP).

== See also ==
- Automatic Identification System
- SOLAS Convention
