= Cuban Workers' Solidarity =

STC
- Cuban Workers' Solidarity
- Solidaridad de Trabajadores Cubanos
- Headquarters: Caracas, Venezuela
- Location: Cuba
- Key people: Heriberto Fernández, secretary general
- Affiliations: ITUC
- Website: www.webstc.org

The Cuban Workers' Solidarity (STC) is a trade union organization in exile for Cuba. It is based in Caracas, Venezuela, and is affiliated with the International Trade Union Confederation.
