= National Congress of Thai Labour =

NCTL
- National Congress of Thai Labour
- Headquarters: Samut Prakan, Thailand
- Location: Thailand
- Key people: Panus Thailuan, president
- Affiliations: ITUC

The National Congress of Thai Labour (NCTL, Thai: สภาองค์การลูกจ้างแรงงานแห่งประเทศไทย) is a trade union federation in Thailand. It is affiliated with the International Trade Union Confederation.
