= Central Council of United Trade Unions =

CCUTU
- Central Council of United Trade Unions
- شورای متحده مرکزی
- Founded: May 1, 1944
- Dissolved: 1949
- Location: Iran
- Members: 400,000 (1946 claim)
- Key people: Reza Rousta
- Affiliations: World Federation of Trade Unions

The Central Council of United Trade Unions (abbreviated CCUTU, Persian: شورای متحده مرکزی اتحادیه کارگران و زحمتکشان ایران, 'Central United Council of the Trade Unions of Workers and Toilers of Iran') was a trade union centre in Iran.

== History ==
=== Founding ===
CCUTU was founded through the merger of two hitherto antagonistic unions, the Central Council (the union aligned with the Tudeh Party) and the majority faction of the Central Board. The merger was declared on May 1, 1944. On May 8, 1944, a smaller union centre, the Union of Toilers of Iran, merged into CCUTU, followed by the affiliation of the Railway Workers' Association to CCUTU on June 20, 1944.

At the time of its founding, CCUTU had sixty affiliated unions.

Gradually, the Tudeh Party consolidated its influence over the organization. On July 6, 1944, a shared leadership was announced. Ebrahim Mahzari and Resa Ebrahimzadeh (a communist and former prisoner) were assigned co-chairmen of the CCUTU. On June 18, 1945 the co-chairmen were converted to 'secretaries'. Moreover, a third secretary (Reza Rousta) was appointed. By the autumn of 1945, Rousta was referred to as the sole secretary of the organization.

=== Anti-government campaigns ===
In the autumn of 1944, CCUTU and the Tudeh Party staged a campaign against the Iranian government, demanding oil concessions for the Soviet Union in northern Iran. CCUTU and the party organized a protest, with around 12,000 participants, demanding the dismissal of Prime Minister Mohammad Sa'ed.

At the time of the end of the Second World War, an unemployment crisis emerged in Iran as war-related industries began laying off workers. The CCUTU organ Zafar called on the people to overthrow the government. In response, the offices of CCUTU and the Tudeh Party in Teheran were closed down, CCUTU and Tudeh leaders arrested and the publishing of Zafar (and 13 other newspapers) was stopped. In Mazadaran in northern Iran, workers seized large factories and railroad junctions to protest the crackdown.

=== Azerbaijan ===
On September 7, 1945 the local CCUTU branches in Azerbaijan (along with local Tudeh Party branches) declared their affiliation to the newly founded Democratic Party of Azerbaijan. The move was made without prior consultation with the CCUTU and Tudeh Party leadership in Tehran. The local CCUTU chairman, Muhammud Biriya, was elected to the Central Committee of the Democratic Party of Azerbaijan at the party congress held in October 1945.

=== 1946-1948 ===
After Ahmad Qavam had been elected Prime Minister by the Majles in January 1946, CCUTU issued a series of key demands to the new government; that the labour bill be passed, that the closed CCUTU clubs be reopened and that curbs on press freedom be lifted. In February, Qavam lifted the martial law and the closed clubs were returned to CCUTU. The curbs on the press were lifted two weeks afterwards.

As the economic situation improved in 1947-1948, the influence of the communists amongst the workers declined. There was a sharp decrease in the number of strikes, only five were organized in these years.

=== Ban ===
In early 1949 the Tudeh Party took an initiative to revive CCUTU, but these efforts were interrupted as both the party and CCUTU were banned after an assassination attempt against the Shah in February that year. Several CCUTU activists were arrested. Rousta and seven others were sentenced to death in absentia.

In 1952 the CCUTU organization was revived to some extent. Mohammad Mosaddegh didn't formally lift the ban on the organization, but allowed it to operate semi-legally. However, the movement was crushed after the August 1953 coup.

== Organization ==
=== Membership ===
CCUTU continued to grow, even after the crackdown on the organization in 1945. As of December 1945, the CCUTU leader Reza Rousta claimed that the organization had 209,750 members. A more conservative estimate, and likely more realistic, was made by the U.S. Labor Attaché, which estimated the CCUTU to around 100,000. Its strength was mainly concentrated in the industrial centres of the country. The strength of the organization reached its peak around August 1946. At the time it claimed 400,000 members; out of them 90,000 in the Khuzestan oilfields and 165,000 in the textile industries of the major cities. In total 186 unions were affiliated to CCUTU.

Whilst the organization was primarily focused on organizing the modern working class sectors, CCUTU also had a sizeable following amongst traditional wage earners in the bazaars, as well as having several professional unions at its affiliates, such as the Union of Office Employees, the Union of Teachers, the Association of Lawyers, the Syndicate of Engineers and Technicians and the Society of Doctors. However, CCUTU had virtually no members from the peasantry.

=== Press ===
CCUTU published the daily newspaper Zafar ('Victory'). It later began publishing Bashar ('Human').

=== International affiliation ===
The Iranian government tried to block CCUTU from participating in the founding conference of the World Federation of Trade Unions in Paris in the fall of 1945, by arresting various CCUTU leaders just as they were about to leave the country. In the end Iraj Eskandari (a Tudeh Party secretary and member of the Majles) and a few other delegates represented CCUTU during the final days of the conference. CCUTU became an WFTU affiliate in 1946.
