= Congress of Lesotho Trade Unions =

National trade union center in Lesotho

COLETU
- Congress of Lesotho Trade Unions
- Headquarters: Maseru, Lesotho
- Location: Lesotho
- Key people: Vuyani Tyhali, general secretary
- Affiliations: CTUC

The Congress of Lesotho Trade Unions (COLETU) is a national trade union center in Lesotho.
