= Association of Croatian Trade Unions =

Trade union association in Croatia

- Matica hrvatskih sindikata
- Founded: 27 February 1993
- Headquarters: Trg Maršala Tita 4, Zagreb, Croatia
- Location: Croatia
- Members: 93 000 (17 unions)
- Key people: Vilim Ribić, president

Matica – Association of Croatian Unions (Croatian: Matica hrvatskih sindikata) is the third largest trade union association in Croatia. Founded as Association of Croatian Public Sector Unions in 1993, Matica gathers trade unions from education, health care, graphical industry, services, and social welfare.
