= Workers Autonomous Trade Unions Confederation =

CONFSAL
- Workers Autonomous Trade Unions Confederation
- Confederazione Generale dei Sindacati Autonomi dei Lavoratori
- Founded: 1979
- Headquarters: Rome, Italy
- Location: Italy
- Members: over 1 million (2005)
- Key people: Marco Paolo Nigi, General Secretary
- Affiliations: European Confederation of Independent Trade Unions (CESI)
- Website: www.confsal.it

The Workers Autonomous Trade Unions Confederation (CONFSAL or Conf. S.A.L.; Italian Confederazione Generale dei Sindacati Autonomi dei Lavoratori, German Arbeiter Autonomous Gewerkschaft-Bündnis) is an Italian autonomous trade union association.
