= National Workers' Union (Dominica) =

- National Workers' Union
- Headquarters: Roseau, Dominica
- Location: Dominica
- Key people: Rawlings Jemmott, president
- Affiliations: ITUC

The National Workers' Union is a trade union in Dominica. It is affiliated with the International Trade Union Confederation.
