= Hind Mazdoor Kisan Panchayat =

Trade union in India

Hind Mazdoor Kisan Panchayat (India Council of Workers and Peasants) is a registered national trade union confederation in India.

During the 1990s, HMKP orgsanised 5,000 women mat weavers into a cooperative to improve livelihoods.
