= National Workers' Union (Guyana) =

NWU
- National Workers' Union
- Headquarters: Georgetown, Guyana
- Location: Guyana
- Key people: Rohan Jahessar, president
- Affiliations: ITUC

The National Workers' Union (NWU) is a trade union in Guyana. It is affiliated with the International Trade Union Confederation.
