= Federated Workers Trade Union =

Trade union in Trinidad and Tobago, 1935–1967

The Federated Workers Trade Union (FWTU) was a trade union in Trinidad and Tobago that was formed in 1935. It was registered in 1937 and became the recognised union for some workers in the private sector but also those in the Public Works Department and the Trinidad Government Railways.

In 1959 the Amalgamated Engineering and General Workers' Trade Union merged with the FWTU followed by the British Colonial Taxpayers and All Workers Union in the same year.

The FWTU merged in 1967 with the National Union of Government Employees to form the National Union of Government and Federated Workers.
