= National Union of Government and Federated Workers =

Trade union in Trinidad and Tobago

- National Union of Government and Federated Workers
- Founded: 1967; 59 years ago
- Headquarters: Port of Spain, Trinidad and Tobago
- Location: Trinidad and Tobago
- Members: Approx 20,000 (2006)
- Key people: Christopher Streete (President General); Ramesh Sookdeo (General Secretary)
- Affiliations: NATUC; PSI; IUF
- Website: nugfw.org

The National Union of Government and Federated Workers (NUGFW) is a trade union in Trinidad and Tobago. It was formed on 3 June 1967 out of a merger between the National Union of Government Employees and the Federated Workers Trade Union. It is the largest union in the country.

At the inaugural convention, union leaders declared: "It is recognised that labour unity is essential to the social, economic and political progress of all workers. It is recognised, too, that the fragmentation of the labour movement inhibits such progress."

== See also ==
- List of trade unions
- Nathaniel Crichlow
