= ITUC-Africa =

Regional organisation

ITUC Africa
- ITUC Regional Organisation for Africa
- Founded: 2007
- Headquarters: Lome, Togo
- Location: Africa
- Members: 15 million (2004)
- Key people: Kwasi Adu-Amankwah, General Secretary
- Affiliations: ITUC
- Website: www.ituc-africa.org

The ITUC Regional Organisation for Africa (ITUC-Africa) is a regional organisation of the International Trade Union Confederation, representing trade unions from countries in Africa. There are 56 national trade union federations affiliated to ITUC-Africa, from 45 countries, and representing a total of 15 million workers.

== History ==
The organisation was founded in 2007, at a congress in Accra, with the merger of the ICFTU African Regional Organisation and the World Confederation of Labour's Democratic Organization of African Workers' Trade Union.

The organisation has six main departments, handling conflict resolution, economic & social policy, education, gender & equality, HIV/AIDS, and human & trade union rights. In its own words,

ICFTU-AFRO seeks to fight poverty, unemployment and all forms of discrimination, exploitation, arbitrary unrests, detention without trial and unlawful dismissals.

== Affiliates ==
Union federation	Acronym	Country
General Centre of Independent and Free Unions of Angola	CGSILA	Angola
National Union of Angolan Workers	UNTA-CS	Angola
Botswana Federation of Trade Unions	BFTU	Botswana
Confédération Générale des Syndicats des Travailleurs de Madagascar	FI.SE.MA.	Madagasacar
Christian Confederation of Malagasy Trade Unions	SEKRIMA	Madagasacar
United Autonomous Unions of Madagascar	USAM	Madagasacar
Confédération des Syndicats des Travailleurs Malagasy Révolutionnaires	FISEMARE	Madagasacar
Malawi Congress of Trade Unions	MCTU	Malawi
Mauritius Labour Congress	MLC	Mauritius
Mauritius Trade Union Congress	MTUC	Mauritius
National Trade Unions Confederation	NTUC	Mauritius
Mozambique Workers' Organization	OTM	Mozambique
Trade Union Congress of Namibia	TUCNA	Namibia
Trade Union Congress of Swaziland	TUCOSWA	eSwatini
Zambia Congress of Trade Unions	ZCTU	Zambia
Zimbabwe Congress of Trade Unions	ZCTU	Zimbabwe
Confederation of South African Workers' Unions	CONSAWU	South Africa
Federation of Unions of South Africa	FEDUSA	South Africa
Congress of South African Trade Unions	COSATU	South Africa
National Council of Trade Unions	NACTU	South Africa
Union Interprofessionnelle de la Réunion	UIR-CFDT	Reunion
General Union of the Workers of São Tomé and Príncipe	UGT-STP	Sao Tomé and Principe
National Organization of the Workers of São Tomé and Príncipe – Central Union	ONTSTP-CS	Sao Tomé and Principe
Confederation of Cameroon Trade Unions	CSTC	Cameroon
Union of Free Trade Unions of Cameroon	USLC	Cameroon
General Confederation of Free Workers of Cameroon	CSAC	Cameroon
Confédération Syndicale des Travailleurs de Centrafrique	CSTC	Central African Republic
General Union of Central African Workers	USTC	Central African Republic
National Confederation of Central African Workers	CNTC	Central African Republic
Free Confederation of Chadian Workers	CLTT	Chad
Union of Trade Unions of Chad	UST	Chad
Congolese Trade Union Confederation	CSC	Republic of the Congo
Confédération des Syndicats Libres Autonomes du Congo	COSYLAC	Republic of the Congo
Democratic Confederation of Labour	CDT	Democratic Republic of the Congo
Union Nationale des Travailleurs du Congo	UNTC	Democratic Republic of the Congo
Confédération Syndicale du Congo	CSC	Democratic Republic of the Congo
Confédération Gabonaise des Syndicats Libres	CGSL	Gabon
Confédération Syndicale Gabonaise	COSYGA	Gabon
Confederation of Trade Unions of Burundi	COSYBU	Burundi
Trade Union Confederation of Burundi	CSB	Burundi
Confédération des Travailleurs et travailleuses de Comores	CTTC	Comoros
Union of Djibouti Workers	UDT	Djibouti
National Confederation of Eritrean Workers	NCEW	Eritrea
Confederation of Ethiopian Trade Unions	CETU	Ethiopia
Central Organization of Trade Unions	COTU (K)	Kenya
Trade Union Centre of Workers of Rwanda	CESTRAR	Rwanda
Seychelles Federation of Workers' Unions	SFWU	Seychelles
Federation of Somali Trade Unions	FESTU	Somalia
South Sudan Workers Trade Union Federation	SSWTUF	South Sudan
Trade Union Congress of Tanzania	TUCTA	Tanzania
Zanzibar Trade Union Congress	ZATUC	Tanzania
National Organization of Trade Unions	NOTU	Uganda
Centrale des Syndicats Autonomes du Bénin	CSA	Benin
Union Nationale des Syndicats des Travailleurs du Bénin	UNSTB	Benin
Confédération des organisations syndicales indépendantes du Bénin	COSI	Benin
General Confederation of the Workers of Benin	CGTB	Benin
Centrale de syndicats du privé et de l’informel du Bénin	CSIPB	Benin
Confédération Syndicale Burkinabé	CSB	Burkina Faso
Confédération Nationale des Travailleurs Burkinabé	CNTB	Burkina Faso
Organisation Nationale des Syndicats Libres	ONSL	Burkina Faso
Union Syndicale des Travailleurs du Burkina Faso	USTB	Burkina Faso
União Nacional dos Trabalhadores de Cabo Verde – Central Sindical	UNTC-CS	Cabo Verde
Centrale des Syndicats Libres de Côte d'Ivoire	DIGNITE	Côte d'Ivoire
Union Générale des Travailleurs de Côte d'Ivoire	UGTCI	Côte d'Ivoire
Federation of Autonomous Trade Unions of Ivory Coast	FESACI	Côte d'Ivoire
Centrale Syndicale Humanisme	CSH	Côte d'Ivoire
Gambia Workers' Confederation	GWC	Gambia
Ghana Federation of Labour	GFL	Ghana
Trades Union Congress of Ghana	TUC	Ghana
Confédération Nationale de Travailleurs de Guinée	CNTG	Guinea
Organisation Nationale des Syndicats Libres de Guinée	ONSLG	Guinea
Union Syndicale des Travailleurs de Guinée	USTG	Guinea
Union Nationale des Travailleurs de Guinée Bissau	UNTGB	Guinea-Bissau
Liberia Labour Congress	LLC	Liberia
Confédération Syndicale des Travailleurs du Mali	CSTM	Mali
Union Nationale des Travailleurs du Mali	UNTM	Mali
Democratic Confederation of Workers of Niger	CDTN	Niger
Confédération Nigérienne du Travail	CNT	Niger
Union des Syndicats des Travailleurs du Niger	USTN	Niger
Nigeria Labour Congress	NLC	Nigeria
Confédération des Syndicats Autonomes du Sénégal	CSA	Senegal
Union Nationale des Syndicats Autonomes du Sénégal	UNSAS	Senegal
Democratic Union of Senegalese Workers	UDTS	Senegal
National Confederation of Senegalese Workers	CNTS	Senegal
Confédération nationale des travailleurs du Sénégal – Forces du changement	CNTS-FC	Senegal
Central Confederation of Trade Unions	CCOTU	Sierra Leone
Sierra Leone Labour Congress	SLLC	Sierra Leone
Confédération syndicale des travailleurs du Togo	CSTT	Togo
Union Nationale des Syndicats Indépendants du Togo	UNSIT	Togo
Confédération Nationale des Travailleurs du Togo	CNTT	Togo
Union Général des Syndicats Libres	UGSL	Togo
Union Générale des Travailleurs Algériens	UGTA	Algeria
Confédération Générale des Travailleurs de Mauritanie	CGTM	Mauritania
Confédération Libre des Travailleurs de Mauritanie	CLTM	Mauritania
Union des Travailleurs de Mauritanie	UTM	Mauritania
Confédération Nationale des Travailleurs de Mauritanie	CNTM	Mauritania
Democratic Confederation of Labour	CDT	Morocco
Union Générale des Travailleurs du Maroc	UGTM	Morocco
Union Marocaine du Travail	UMT	Morocco
Union Générale Tunisienne du Travail	UGTT	Tunisia

== Leadership ==
=== General Secretaries ===
2007: Kwasi Adu-Amankwah
2023: Joel Akhator Odigie

=== Presidents ===
2007: Mody Guiro
2023: Martha Tinny Molema
