= Organisation of African Trade Union Unity =

Union federation for trade union centres in Africa

- Abbreviation: OATUU or OUSA
- Formation: April 1973; 53 years ago
- Type: Regional Union Federation
- Purpose: Promote Pan-Africanism while protecting African workers' rights through the promotion of social justice and economic justice throughout African workplaces.
- Headquarters: Accra, Ghana
- Coordinates: 5°37′19″N 0°11′10″W
- Region served: Africa
- Members: 25 million members
- General Secretary: Mezhoud Arezki
- Assistant Secretary General: Nzunda Titus Emmanuel and Udeh Okechukwu Valentine
- Treasurer General: Ibrahim Abrar Ibrahim
- Affiliations: 73 Trade Union Affiliates
- Website: oatuuousa.org

The Organisation of African Trade Union Unity (OATUU) (French: Organisation de L'Unité Syndicale Africaine; OUSA) is an independent regional union federation aimed at unifying trade union centres in Africa. This organisation was founded in April, 1973 as a successor to three previously competing labour union organisations in Africa: the All-African Trade Union Federation (AATUF), the African Trade Union Confederation (ATUC), and the Pan-African Workers' Congress. The process to unify a Pan-African labour union organisation also involved international labour organisations as decision-making stakeholders like the International Confederation of Free Trade Unions (ICFTU) and the World Federation of Trade Unions (WFTU). Finally, also with the help of the Organisation of African Unity (OAU), the AATUF and the ATUC merged to form the OATUU. The driving factors for this unification and the creation of the OATUU was to advance Pan-Africanism, economic justice, and social justice throughout African workplaces.

As of 2022, the OATUU has been collaborating with the International Labor organisation (ILO) to be an exclusive, overarching organisation representing African workers' interests. The OATUU has four regional sub-organisations: The Organisation of Trade Unions of West Africa (OTUWA); Organisation of Trade Unions of Central Africa (OTUCA); Southern Africa Trade Union Coordinating Council (SATUCC); and the Organisation of Trade Unions of Arab Maghreb (OTUAM). Together, they represent a total of 73 national labour union affiliates, totalling at approximately 25 million individual members. The OATUU strives to promote "social and economic justice" in Africa through projects that combat HIV/AIDS, fund women empowerment in the workplace, and support democratisation efforts in African nations. The OATUU receives financial support from the ILO to directly fund these projects as well as lobbying efforts that favour policies conducive to economic development in Africa.

== History ==
=== Prior to the Organisation of African Trade Union Unity ===
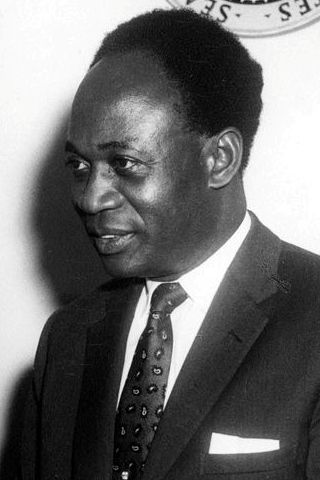
Kwame Nkrumah, Head of the AAPC in 1958, and prominent Pan-Africanist.

The first Pan-African trade union organisation, the All-African Trade Union Federation (AATUF), was founded in Casablanca, Morocco in 1961. The AATUF was born out of the resolutions from the first All-African People’s Conference (AAPC) held in 1958 at Accra, Ghana headed by prominent Pan-Africanists like Tom Mboya and Kwame Nkrumah. The AATUF aimed at promoting Pan-Africanism and being an independent federation of labour unions that prioritized the interests of all African workers throughout the continent.

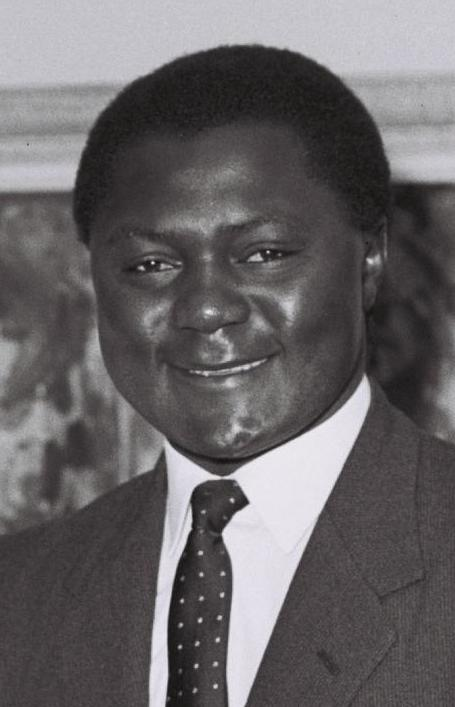
Tom Mboya in 1962, one of the original founders of the AATUF.

Following the Second World War, African workers under colonial rule were split and led to the formation of various independent trade unions across the continent. And after Decolonization of Africa in the 1950s, many regional African trade unions maintained close relations with their respective imperial centres. Following independence, early attempts at Pan-Africanism via union federation were further complicated by Cold War ideological differences. As African nations subscribed to combinations of anti-colonial nationalism, pro-Western capitalism, as well as series of Marxist and socialist alignments within the Eastern Bloc, ideological differences from the 1950s to 1970s obstructed attempts at unity.

While the AATUF was initially successful in remaining non-partisan and free from foreign intervention during the 1960s, the newly created African Trade Union Confederation (ATUC) supported by the International Confederation of Free Trade Unions (ICFTU) was beginning to grow and destabilize AATUF's resolution to be the sole representative for a Pan-African workers' trade union federation. This led to a partitioning of African trade unions along ideological lines and the AATUF began to align with the World Federation of Trade Unions (WFTU) in response to the ATUC’s creation in 1962. The several trade union federation organisations in Africa clashed and interfered with each other and provoked internal conflicts throughout the 1960s.

=== Rise of the OATUU ===
The open split between the two unions (AATUF and the ATUC) brought in the involvement of the newly formed Organisation of African Unity (OAU) as a mediator for disputes in African trade union affairs. Beginning in 1964, both the AATUF and ATUC sent delegations to OAU summits to gain exclusive recognition as the sole representative of African workers’ interests. This led to the court of African Labour Ministers, who gathered from 1966 to 1967, to discuss what role trade unions should play in Africa’s development and how to achieve unity between them. In 1967, the OAU’s Administrative Secretary-General called all national trade union centres to attend a conference aimed at reconciling AATUF and ATUC conflicts and aspirations. This conference was called the organisation of African Trade Union Unity (OATUU) held in November, 1972 in Addis Ababa, Ethiopia. In collaboration with the International Labor Organisation (ILO) in organizing the conference, the OAU Secretary General presented unity as a core principle to all trade union centres in Africa. Under the auspices of Pan-Africanism, an agreement was finally brokered in April, 1973 formally establishing the OATUU. The OATUU’s creation meant the absorption of the AATUF, ATUC, the Pan-African Congress, as well as other smaller workers’ organisations across Africa.

=== History of General Secretaries ===
1973: Dennis Akumu
1980: Ibrahim Ghandour
1986: Hassan Sunmonu
1991: Napoleon Kpoh
2012: Owei Lakemfa
2015: Mezhoud Arezki

== The OATUU Today ==
The OATUU acted first as a partner, then as a successor to ILO responsibilities in Africa. One of their most notable activities is aiding national liberation movements across Africa, such as advocating for workers’ rights during the Apartheid in South Africa. In addition to sharing mandates, the ILO supports and funds “extensive worker education programmes (WED)” which the OATUU offers at the national, regional, and continental levels. As noted, The OATUU strives to promote "social and economic justice" in Africa dealing with problems like HIV/AIDS, women empowerment in the workplace, and democratisation in African nations. The OATUU receives financial support from the ILO to directly fund these social projects, and more critically, supports lobbying efforts that would be favourable to union workers across Africa.

=== List of OATUU Conferences and Notable Events ===
Date	Conference	Location	Notable Features
April 1973	The OATUU inaugural conference	Addis Ababa, Ethiopia	The OATUU first formed.
March 18th-20th, 1975	First OATUU General Council Meeting	Accra, Ghana	All national trade union centers in Africa achieve membership in OATUU.
April 20th-23rd, 1976	Second OATUU General Council Meeting	Tripoli, Libya	It was decided that research should be conducted on how transnational companies could enhance the development of Africa.
1978	ILO’s first conference for National Liberation Movements	Lusaka, Zambia	Emphasized the need for collaboration of trade union organisations such as the OATUU with governments to achieve independence.
1980	Third OATUU General Council Meeting	Mogadishu, Somalia	Highlighting and attempting to unify the ideological and financial divides within the OATUU.
1985	Fourth OATUU General Council Meeting	Lagos, Nigeria	The conference set out to elect a new chairman, yet no conclusive election of officers took place. Controversies regarding corruption and the general effectiveness of the organisation ensued.
April 12th-14th, 1994	OATUU/ECA/ILO Seminar on Democracy and Popular Participation for African Trade Union Leaders	Addis Ababa, Ethiopia	Established the "Programme of Action to Sustain Democracy and Popular Participation in Development".

=== Key Activities and Functions ===
While there has been much coverage for the history and the formation of the OATUU, the details of their current duties and activities have not been covered as extensively by secondary publications.

As of 2022 there are 73 affiliates to The Organisation of African Trade Union Unity, 33 from former Francophone nations, 28 from former Anglophone nations, and 12 semi-regional trade unions who operate out of the OATUU's four regional sub-organisations: The Organisation of Trade Unions of West Africa (OTUWA); Organisation of Trade Unions of Central Africa (OTUCA); Southern Africa Trade Union Coordinating Council (SATUCC); and the Organisation of Trade Unions of Arab Maghreb (OTUAM).

Their key vision is to represent workers from all African countries for the “realization of social and economic justice for all”. The OATUU has 12 listed official goals all striving to strengthen the relationship and coordination of economic activities between their affiliate members. The OATUU carries out a variety of education, training, research and advisory tasks across various areas in the Africa: national defense, democracy, women empowerment, entrepreneurship, health and safety, actions against HIV/AIDS, African economic integration, and trade. Upholding the rights of African trade unions are also a big part of their mandate, and the OATUU will do so by assisting labour unions navigate the complicated bureaucratic processes of international organisations, such as filing the paperwork for labor claims with the ILO.

The OATUU acts as an agent representing the economic interests of African governments in international organisations, namely pushing back against International Monetary Fund (IMF), World Bank, and World Trade Organisation (WTO) policies that harm African domestic industry and labor standards. By also working with the African Union (AU), the OATUU attempts to continually strengthen the political, social, and economic integration throughout the continent. Together, the OATUU, the ILO, and the AU, in consultation with the United Nations (UN) have strived to strengthen the African Economic Community (AEC), promote African alternative frameworks to Structural Adjustment Programmes (SAP), and push for debt-cancellation across Africa.

=== Affiliates ===
==== Francophone ====
Country	Trade Union	Acronym
Algeria	General Union of Algerian Workers	UGTA
Angola	Union Nationale des Travailleurs d’Angola	UNTA
Benin	Union Nationale Des Syndicats des Travailleurs du Benin	UNSTB
Burkina Faso	Confédération Syndicale du Burkina Faso	CSB
Burkina Faso	Confédération Nationale des Travailleurs Burkinabé	CNTB
Burkina Faso	Organisation Nationale des Syndicats Libres	ONSL
Burkina Faso	Union Syndicale des Travailleurs du Burkina Faso	USTB
Burundi	Confédération des Syndicats du Burundi	CSB
Cameroon	Confédération Syndicale des Travailleurs du Cameroun	CSTC
Cape Verde	Union Nationale des Travailleurs du Cap-Vert	UNTC-CS
Central African Republic	Union Syndicale des Travailleurs de Centrafrique	USTC
Chad	Union des Syndicats du Tchad	UST
Comoros	Union des Syndicats des Travailleurs des Comores	USTC
Democratic Republic of Congo	Confédération Syndicale Congolaise	CSC
Democratic Republic of Congo	Union Nationale des Travailleurs du Congo	UNTC
Djibouti	Union Générale des Travailleurs Djiboutiens	UGTD
Equatorial Guinea	Union Nationale des Travailleurs de la Guinée Equatoriale	UNTG
Gabon	Confédération Syndical Gabonaise	COSYGA
Guinea Bissau	Union Nationale des Syndicats de Guinée Bissau	UNSGB
Guinea Conakry	Confédération Nationale des Travailleurs Guinée	CNTG
Ivory Coast	Union Générale des Travailleurs de Côte d'Ivoire	UGTCI
Madagascar	Fédération des Syndicats des Travailleurs de Madagascar	FISEMA
Mali	Union Nationale des Travailleurs du Mali	UNTM
Mauritania	Union des Travailleurs Mauritanie	UTM
Morocco	Union Générale des Travailleurs du Maroc	UGTM
Morocco	Confédération Démocratique du Travail	CDT
Niger	Union des Syndicats des Travailleurs du Niger	USTN
Rwanda	Centrale des Syndicats des Travailleurs du Rwanda	CESTRAR
Senegal	Union des Travailleurs du Sénégal	UTS
Senegal	Union Démocratique des Travailleurs du Senegal	UDTS
Senegal	Confédération Nationale des Travailleurs du Senegal	CNTS
Togo	Confédération Nationale des Travailleurs du Togo	CNTT
Tunisia	Union Générale Tunisienne du Travail	UGTT

==== Anglophone ====
Country	Trade Union	Acronym
Botswana	Botswana Federation of Trade Unions	BFTU
Egypt	Egyptian Trade Union Federation	ETUF
Eritrea	National Confederation of Eritrean Workers	NCEW
Ethiopia	Confederation of Ethiopian Trade Unions	CETU
Gambia	Gambia Workers Congress	GWC
Gambia	Gambia Labour Congress	GLC
Ghana	Ghana Trade Unions Congress	GTUC
Kenya	Central Organization of Trade Unions	COTU-K
Lesotho	Lesotho Trade Union Congress	LTUC
Liberia	Liberia Labour Congress	LLC
Libya	National Union of Libyan Workers	NULW
Malawi	Malawi Congress of Trade Unions	MCTU
Mauritius	Mauritius Labour Congress	MLC
Mozambique	Mozambique Workers' Organisation (Organização dos Trabalhadores de Moçambique)	OTM
Namibia	Namibia Union of Namibian Workers	NUNW
Nigeria	Nigeria Labour Congress	NLC
Seychelles	Seychelles Federation of Workers Union	SFWU
Sierra Leone	Sierra Leone Labour Congress	SLLC
Somalia	Federation of Somali Trade Unions	FESTU
South Africa	Congress of South African Trade Unions	COSATU
South Africa	National Council of Trade Unions	NACTU
Swaziland	Trade Union Congress of Eswatini	TUCOSWA
Sudan	Sudan Workers’ Trade Unions Federation	SWTUF
Sudan	South Sudan Workers’ Trade Unions Federation	SSWTF
Tanzania	Trade Union Congress of Tanzania	TUCTA
Uganda	National Organisation of Trade Unions	NOTU
Zambia	Zambia Congress of Trade Unions	ZCTU
Zimbabwe	Zimbabwe Congress of Trade Unions	ZCTU

== Criticisms ==
=== Corruption ===
The OATUU’s 4th Congress in 1985 held in Lagos, Nigeria collapsed as a number of unions accused the secretariat of misusing funds and manipulating votes. The OATUU’s Secretary General refused to resign and a thus Provisional Coordinating Committee was established within the OATUU. In 1985, the Workers Education Programme (WED) canceled a project funded by the Danish International Development Agency (DANIDA) and the ILO citing for concerns of foreign influence and the misappropriation of funds by the organisation's leadership. Thus, divides within the OATUU ensued, further jeopardizing the OATUU's official mandate of promoting Pan-Africanism and unity.

=== Lack of Finances ===
The OATUU has had difficulty in establishing their own fundraising capacities, and so the basis for the OATUU has always been under significant threat; the OATUU still persists today mostly because of its ability to continue to leverage resources through the ILO. The financial problems the OATUU experienced in their early years of establishment meant that educational programmes had to be funded by external donor participants. The financial hardships led to the OATUU becoming greatly dependent on, and beholden to the interests of other governments and political groups. For example, Libyans from the National Union of Libyan Workers (NULW) were compelled to accept substantial sources of funding from “the Palestine Liberation Organisation (PLO), the Soviet Union, and several other African governments” regardless of its conditionality throughout the 1990s.

=== Illiteracy ===
At the "Democracy and Popular Participation for African Trade Union Leaders" seminar held in Addis Ababa, Ethiopia in April 1994, trade union representatives identified mass illiteracy among the African population as an issue that was negatively impacting the growth of democratisation, a fundamental tenet of the OATUU's mission in Africa. Many felt that the socio-economic conditions had been negatively impacted by Structural Adjustment Programs (SAPs) supported by the IMF and the World Bank, ultimately reducing the capabilities for democratic developments in the continent. Representatives decided that in order to increase the level of democratisation within the continent, trade unions needed to increase levels of education and training programmes, not just for representative members but also their surrounding communities. The hope was this would put pressure on African governments to create more employment, focus on education, and promote social values.

== See also ==
- List of federations of trade unions
- African Regional Organisation of the International Trade Union Confederation (ITUC)
- Organisation of African Unity (OAU)
- Pan-Africanism
- All-African People’s Conference (AAPC)
- All-African Trade Union Federation (AATUF)
