= East African Trade Union Confederation =

Regional trade union confederation in East Africa

- Abbreviation: EATUC
- Founded: 1988 (predecessor); 2003 (contemporary)
- Type: Trade union federation
- Headquarters: TUCTA Building 3rd Floor, Azimio Street, Arusha, Tanzania
- Region served: Various countries of the East African Community
- Members: ~4.5 million (2020)
- Affiliations: East African Community
- Website: https://eatuc.org/

The East African Trade Union Confederation (EATUC) is a regional labour assembly of the national trade union centres of most East African Community-member countries, those being Kenya, Uganda, Tanzania (along with Zanzibar), Burundi, and Rwanda.

== Overview ==
EATUC's primary purpose is to serve as a collective voice for workers of the East African Community, especially in international affairs (e.g. trade deals with developed countries, etc.). It additionally advocates for various worker-related causes such as freedom of movement throughout East Africa, safety for migrant workers, autonomy for woman and child labourers, and adherence to international labour laws.

Rather than being directly subordinated to the East African Community, EATUC holds "observer" status within it, allowing the confederation to have autonomy in decision-making and other activities. The national trade union centres affiliated to EATUC are the Central Organization of Trade Unions (COTU) of Kenya, the National Organization of Trade Unions (NOTU) of Uganda, the Zanzibar Trade Union Congress (ZATUC), the Trade Union Congress of Tanzania (TUCTA), the Confédération des Syndicats du Burundi (COSYBU), and the Centrale des Syndicats des Travailleurs du Rwanda (CESTRAR).

Internationally, EATUC is a member of the International Trade Union Confederation (ITUC) and the Organisation of African Trade Union Unity (OATUU). Along with the Southern Africa Trade Union Coordinating Council, EATUC is one of the most active regional trade union federations on the continent.

== History ==
EATUC's predecessor organization, the East African Trade Union Consultative Council, was formed in 1988. In 2003, it was reorganized into the current EATUC, and it established a permanent secretariat in Arusha, Tanzania in October 2006. Burundi and Rwanda did not become members of the confederation until 2007, when they joined the East African Community.
