= Trade unions in Chad =

- National organization(s): UST; CLTT
- Primary legislation: 1996 constitution

Global Rights Index
- 4 Systematic violations of rights

International Labour Organization
- Chad is a member of the ILO

Convention ratification
- Freedom of Association: 1960
- Right to Organise: 1961

There are five recognized trade union confederations in Chad as of 2021:

- Union of Trade Unions of Chad (UST; Union des Syndicats du Tchad)
- Free Confederation of Chadian Workers (CLTT; Confédération Libre des Travailleurs du Tchad)
- Confederation of Trade Unions of Chad (CST; Confédération de Syndicat du Tchad)
- Trade Union Confederation of Workers of Chad (CSTT; Confédération Syndicale des Travailleurs du Tchad)
- Independent Confederation of Trade Unions of Chad (CIST; Confédération Indépendante des Syndicats du Tchad)

The International Trade Union Confederation (ITUC) recognizes two affiliates, Free Confederation of Chadian Workers and Union of Trade Unions of Chad. ITUC recently rejected an affiliation request from the Confederation of Trade Unions of Chad, but remains open to the Independent Confederation of Trade Unions of Chad.

The UST is seen by the UN Human Rights Committee as the most representative union in its 2013 report.

== Repression ==
The ITUC ranked Chad a score of 4 on the Global Rights Index in 2024, due its frequent repression of trade union leaders including arrests, union busting and restrictions on strikes.

== History ==
French trade unions maintained outposts in French Chad, before Chad was decolonized in 1960. The first president of the new state, François Tombalbaye was a trade unionist in the 1940s.

In 1964, under the one-party rule of the Chadian Progressive Party, the National Union of Chadian Workers (UNTT; French: Union Nationale des Travailleurs Tchadiens) was established by merging all existing unions (except Christian unions) and had a combined membership of 8,000 salaried workers. In 1968, remaining groups were absorbed into the re-branded confederation National Union of Workers of Chad (UNATRAT; French: Union Nationale des Travailleurs du Tchad). By 1972 its membership increased to 12,000. Some of the membership supported the FROLINAT insurgency group, but trade union support was not influential. In 1975 strikes were made illegal and in 1976 public-sector employees were barred from joining unions (both repealed in the 1996 Constitution).

In 1988, UNATRAT was re-launched as National Union of Unions of Chad (UNST; French: Nationale des Syndicats du Tchad) which dissolved shortly after in 1990 when President Déby rose to power. Previous members of UNST split into two directions. Dissidents formed the present day Free Confederation of Chadian Workers (CLTT; French: Confédération Libre desTravailleurs du Tchad), affiliated to the World Confederation of Labour, (Note: World Confederation of Labour merged later into the International Trade Union Confederation) while loyalists to the new Déby regime staged a general strike, in order to reinstate UNST. The government agreed, as long as UNST changed its name, so its successor Union of Trade Unions of Chad (UST; French: Union des Syndicats du Tchad) was re-established.

== See also ==
- Trade unions in Cameroon
