= Trade unions in Tanzania =

- National organization(s): Trade Union Congress of Tanzania (TUCTA); Zanzibar Trade Union Congress (ZATUC)
- Regulatory authority: Registrar of Trade Unions
- Total union membership: approx. 370,000
- Union density: General:less than 2% Formal sector:26.5%
- Proportion of women: General: 25% Leadership positions: 2%

Global Rights Index
- 4 Systematic violations of rights

International Labour Organization
- Tanzania is a member of the ILO

Convention ratification
- Freedom of Association: April 18, 2000
- Right to Organise: January 30, 1962

The trade unions of Tanzania have a total membership of approximately 370,000. 350,000 of these belong to the Trade Union Congress of Tanzania, another 15,000 to the Zanzibar Trade Union Congress, and 2,400 are members of the Tanzania Fishing Crew and Allied Workers’ Union.

== Pre-independence ==
The first Tanganyikan trade union, the Motor Drivers' Union, was founded in 1927. In 1937, Asian workers founded the Asiatic Labour Union, leading to the founding of numerous unions in the country. These early organizations were not, however, involved in many industrial conflicts, their primary activity being the organizing of mutual help among its members.

The roots of the modern Tanzanian labor movement reach back to the 1940s. By 1947, five unions had been registered with the authorities. The colonial government reacted to the creation of unions in Tanzania by enacting laws which allowed it to keep tabs on the movement – for example, the registration of unions become obligatory. Nonetheless, the labor movement grew, by 1956 there were 23 organizations with a total of nearly 13,000 members.

In 1955, seventeen trade unions finally merged to create the Tanganyika Federation of Labour (TFL). Its original two main objectives were to gain more members and to absorb smaller unions. During the country's fight for independence, the TFL collaborated with the Tanganyika African National Union (TANU), a party founded in 1954, in its fight for the nation's independence from the United Kingdom achieving this goal in 1961.

Flag of the brief Sultanate of Zanzibar

The first union in Zanzibar, where the Tanganyikan labor unions were not active, was the Seamen's Union, which was founded in 1955. There had been a strike by the island's dock workers in 1948, but no organized labor movement until 1955. A wave of union foundings followed that of the Seamen's Union, but these organizations did not have many members as Zanzibar was only scarcely populated and the socio-economic activities were few. In 1956, the Federation of Zanzibar and Pemba Trade Unions (ZPFL) was founded with assistance from Tanganyikan unionists. During the first half of the 1960s the Zanzibari labor movement flourished. During the 1964 revolution, the labor movement collaborated with peasants to overthrow the Sultan.

== NUTA, JUWATA, and OTTU ==
Flag of Tanzania

Although the joint efforts of the TANU and the TFL resulted in Tanzanian independence from the United Kingdom, trade unions presented what Edwin Babeiya has framed as "direct confrontation with the post independence TANU government over various issues such as Africanization and trade unions' autonomy." In 1962, there were a total of 182,000 workers organized in the trade unions of the newly independent Tanganyika and 152 strikes involving 48,434 workers forcing the state to react. The 1964 NUTA Act disbanded the TFL and established the National Union of Tanganyika Workers (NUTA) as the sole trade union in the country. This was the end of all labor autonomy in the country as the union's main function was to propagate the government's policies and the leadership of the NUTA was appointed by the country's president. As mentioned above, the situation in the early 1960s in Zanzibar, which had merged with Tanganyika to form Tanzania in 1964, was similar. As in mainland Tanzania, the government banned the existing trade unions, namely the ZPFL, and instituted the Federation of Revolutionary Trade Unions (FRTU) as the new union federation of Zanzibar. The FRTU was heavily involved in the government's dealings including the preparation of the new constitution. But in 1966, the FRTU was no longer needed. Thus, the government dissolved it and the Department of Labour, directed by the ASP, took over labor affairs, but it was dissolved as well as soon as 1968.

In 1977, the ruling parties of Zanzibar and mainland Tanzania, the TANU and the ASP merged to form Chama Cha Mapinduzi (CCM). Likewise, the TANU-affiliated union, the only labor organization in the country, was restructured. The Union of Tanzanian Workers or Jumuiya ya Wafanyakazi Tanzania (JUWATA) was thus founded in the following year. It continued the NUTA's tradition of complete loyalty to the ruling party, but covered all of Tanzania, including Zanzibar, although the government of the region was reluctant to allow unionist activity to resume on the island.

Following an economic crisis in the early 1980s, growing pressure for trade union autonomy in conjunction with the country's transition to a multi-party system in 1990 led to the JUWATA's dissolution and the founding of the Organisation of Tanzania Trade Unions (OTTU) in 1992. The move was approved by the country's president and parliament. The main difference between the OTTU and the JUWATA was that the former consisted of sectoral unions and allowed the creation of eleven industrial unions. Moreover, the union's internal structure was more democratic than that of its predecessor. After the President broke a promise to raise salaries in the country in 1993, the OTTU conducted a successful strike from March 1 to 3 showing that the union was no longer controlled by the government. In January 1994, a strike by high school teachers led to massive government repression including the suspension of 318 teachers as well as to the creation of the Tanzania Teachers' Union.

In 1995, the eleven national unions decided to form the Federation of Free Trade Unions (TFTU). Bruno Mpangala was its secretary general. The membership was approximately 348,000, but declined in the following years, mostly as a result of government staff reductions. Formally, the unions were still part of the OTTU and the TFTU did not have the power to negotiate with employers, this was done by the respective industrial unions.

== Trade Union Act ==
In 1998, the Trade Union Act No. 10 made trade unions independent of the government. This move was mostly supported by the unions, although some aspects of it were criticized, especially the extent of the powers of the Registrar of Trade Unions. The act allows any twenty workers to found a trade union and any two unions to create a national center. The Registrar, which is responsible for administrating the provisions of the act may, however, cancel or refuse the registration of a union.

The act does not apply to Zanzibar and Pemba. These islands have a similar law, which allows unions to be formed and registered with the Registrar of Trade Unions at Zanzibar. In general the restrictions on the labor movement on the island are much stricter than on the mainland. For example, workers are legally prohibited from striking.

== TUCTA and ZATUC ==
Logo of the TUCTA

In 2000, the Trade Union Congress of Tanzania (TUCTA) was founded as a new umbrella organization for the unions of the country. The main difference between it and its predecessor is that the TUCTA covers only mainland Tanzania, the Zanzibar Trade Union Congress being responsible for Zanzibar.
