= 2009 Nigerien constitutional referendum =

- 4 August 2009
- Do you approve of the draft Constitution submitted to your sanction?

Results
Choice	Votes	%
Yes	3,704,557	92.50%
No	300,339	7.50%
Valid votes	4,004,896	97.06%
Invalid or blank votes	121,302	2.94%
Total votes	4,126,198	100.00%
Registered voters/turnout	6,045,140	68.26%

A constitutional referendum was held in Niger on 4 August 2009. The referendum proposed the dissolution of the Fifth Republic and the creation of the Sixth Republic under a fully presidential system of government, offering a yes or no vote on the suspension of the constitution and granting President Mamadou Tandja a three-year interim government, during which the constitution of the Sixth Republic would be formulated. On 20 June, the Constitutional Court declared the plan illegal, but Tandja subsequently assumed emergency powers and dissolved the Court. The events surrounding this election led to a constitutional crisis.

Although the opposition boycotted the referendum, official results reported that turnout was 68%, with 92.5% of voters in favor. The new constitution was accordingly promulgated on 18 August 2009.

== Background ==
The full details of the referendum proposal were not finalized, but elements of the proposed constitution were outlined by government spokesmen and by a commission set up by the president to draft a proposed document. Tandja would extend his term for a transitional mandate of three years, during which a new constitution would be written and approved. The system of government would be changed from a semi-presidential system to a full presidential system, which Tandja claims is more stable. There would be no limit to presidential terms, and a bi-cameral legislature would be created with an upper house, the Senate.

On 5 June, the President and the Council of Ministers of Niger approved plans for the referendum, titled Referendum on the Project of the VIth Republic. Campaigning would take place from 13 July 2009 to 2 August 2009. The President established a commission to create a draft constitutional law upon which the population would vote. The Independent National Electoral Commission (CENI) was ordered to oversee preparations for voting. Electors would be able to choose "yes" or "no" to the text "Do you approve of the Constitutional project submitted for your assent?"

On 12 June 2009, the Constitutional Court ruled against Tandja's referendum proposal, following a non-binding advisement to the President the month before. This time the ruling was in response to a case brought by a coalition of opposition groups, which included the CDS, a governing partner in the previous government, without which the MNSD could not gain a majority in the Assembly. In such cases, the Constitution specifies that rulings of the Constitutional Court are binding and may not be appealed. Thereafter, CENI announced that National Assembly elections would take place on 20 August, and no referendum would be voted upon.

CENI chairman Moumouni Hamidou stated, following the 18 June Court decision, that they would not hold the 4 August Referendum, and were preparing almost seven million voting cards for the 20 August legislative elections. By law, Nigerien electoral officials must send out voter cards two months prior to an election.

Upon the final ruling by the Constitutional Court, Tandja declared that he had assumed "special powers" as the "independence of the nation was threatened". Interior Minister Albade Abouba announced on 28 June, following President Tandja's assumption of emergency powers, that both the 4 August referendum and the 20 August parliamentary election would go ahead.

== Conduct ==
The vote went ahead as planned on 4 August, although the opposition chose to boycott it. As the boycott made the outcome of the referendum effectively a foregone conclusion, voter turnout assumed a greater significance, as a higher turnout would enhance the referendum's appearance of legitimacy and a lower turnout would suggest that the population had followed the opposition leaders' call for a boycott. As vote counting took place on 5 August, CENI President Moumouni Hamidou said that voter turnout had varied "between 40 and 90 percent" across the country, with the higher figures found in rural areas. Marou Amadou of the opposition FDD coalition said that this was a "ridiculous" claim and that actual turnout was less than seven percent. In the Kabalewa district, from which Tandja originated, turnout was placed at the particularly high level of 94.72%; in Arlit, official turnout was only 30.8%.

Large signs from President Tandja were posted in Niamey on 6 August, reading "For your fresh show of confidence, all of you: thank you". Meanwhile, the opposition Coordination of Democratic Forces for the Republic (CFDR) described the referendum as "organised in breach of the laws of the Republic" and said that it was "rejected by the sovereign people and it is null and void". It claimed that less than five percent of the population voted and stated that "in boycotting the referendum, Niger people have clearly rejected the autocratic scheme of the President"; according to the CFDR, the turnout figures were "seriously inflated" and many of the "yes" votes were not from real voters.

== Results ==
Official results on 7 August 2009 reported a turnout of 68.26% with 92.5% of the votes in favour. Speaking on 8 August, opposition leader Mahamadou Issoufou vowed to "resist and fight against this coup d'etat enacted by President Tandja and against his aim of installing a dictatorship in our country". After calling for protests, Marou Amadou was arrested on 10 August; he was quickly released on the orders of a judge in Niamey, but according to a member of his non-governmental organization, the United Front for the Protection of Democracy (FUSAD), he was then "kidnapped ... by members of the Republican Guard at the prison in Niamey as he was trying to complete formalities for his freedom from prison".

The Constitutional Court's decision confirming the referendum results was announced on 14 August 2009, thereby legally validating the outcome. Mahamane Hamissou of the CFDR derided the validation as a "non-event" and vowed to fight on against Tandja's alleged effort to impose "dictatorship", while Issoufou's PNDS party dismissed the Constitutional Court as "a tailor-made court that merely did the work for which it was created". On 16 August, Issoufou Sidibé, the Secretary-General of the Democratic Confederation of the Workers of Niger (CDTN), announced that the CFDR would conduct nationwide protests against the "fantasy results" on 20 August.

Choice	Votes	%
For	3,704,557	92.50
Against	300,339	7.50
Invalid/blank votes	121,302	–
Total	4,126,198	100
Registered voters/turnout	6,045,140	68.26
Source: Direct Democracy

== Aftermath ==
President Tandja promulgated the new constitution on 18 August, and Prime Minister Seyni Oumarou submitted the resignation of his government to Tandja. Tandja reappointed Oumarou and the whole government without changes on 19 August. Although the composition of the government was unchanged, its reappointment marked the formal transition from a semi-presidential system (in which the President and Prime Minister share executive power) to a presidential system in which the President holds full executive power.

The opposition held a protest in Niamey on 22 August despite an official ban. Police fired tear gas and broke up the protest.

== See also ==
- 2009–10 Nigerien constitutional crisis
