= ICFTU African Regional Organisation =

- Merged into: African Regional Organisation of the International Trade Union Confederation
- Founded: 1957 (1993)
- Dissolved: 2007
- Headquarters: Lome, Togo
- Location: Africa
- Members: 15 million (2004)
- Affiliations: ICFTU
- Website: www.icftuafro.org

The ICFTU African Regional Organisation (AFRO) was a regional organisation of the International Confederation of Free Trade Unions (ICFTU), representing trade unions from countries in Africa.

== History ==
The organisation held its first congress in Accra in January 1957, but had little organisation in its early years. In 1965, the ICFTU's secretariat placed the organisation under the direct control of the ICFTU General Secretary, and it did not regain its autonomy until 1972. At that year's congress, F. T. Tekie of Ethiopia was elected as General Secretary of AFRO, but he was arrested in 1974.

but the current organisation was not fully formed until 1993. In 2007, the ICFTU merged with the World Confederation of Labour (WCL). AFRO merged with the WCL's Democratic Organization of African Workers' Trade Union, forming the African Regional Organisation of the International Trade Union Confederation.

== Affiliates ==
The following federations were affiliated in 1965:

| Union | Country |
|---|---|
| General League of Angolan Workers in Exile | Angola |
| West Cameroon Trades Union Congress | Cameroon |
| General Labour Federation of the Congo | Democratic Republic of the Congo |
| Confederation of Free Trade Unions of the Congo | Democratic Republic of the Congo |
| Confederation of Ethiopian Trade Unions | Ethiopia |
| National Confederation of Gabonese Workers | Gabon |
| Gambia Workers' Union | Gambia |
| General Union of Workers of Guinea Bissau | Guinea Bissau |
| Congress of Industrial Organisations | Liberia |
| National Federation of Trade Unions | Libya |
| Confederation of Malagasy Workers | Madagascar |
| Trades Union Congress of Malawi | Malawi |
| Mauritius Labour Congress | Mauritius |
| United Labour Congress | Nigeria |
| Somali Confederation of Labour | Somalia |
| Central Government Workers' Union | Sudan |
| General Federation of Tunisian Workers | Tunisia |
| Uganda Trades Union Congress | Uganda |
| National Organisations of Free Trade Unions | Upper Volta |

== Leadership ==
=== General Secretaries ===
1964: Momodou Jallow
1965: Post vacant
1972: Fisseha Tsion Tekie
1974: George Palmer (acting)
1979: Amos Gray
1993: Andrew Keilembo

=== Presidents ===
1960: Haroun Popoola Adebola
1964: Humphrey Luande
1965: Post vacant
1972: Alhaji Yunusa Kaltungo
1979: Boniface Kabore
1988: Sadok Allouche
1993: Madia Diop
2005: Mody Guiro

== See also ==
- ITUC Regional Organisation for Asia and Pacific
- Trade Union Confederation of the Americas
- European Trade Union Confederation
- List of federations of trade unions
