= Trade unions in Cameroon =

- Primary legislation: 1992 Labour Code

Global Rights Index
- 4 Systematic violations of rights

International Labour Organization
- Cameroon is a member of the ILO

Convention ratification
- Freedom of Association: 7 June 1960
- Right to Organise: 3 September 1962

There are six recognized trade union confederations in Cameroon as of 2021. The main federation Confederation of Cameroon Trade Union has undergone many organizational splits and attempts by the government to retain its influence.

== Repression ==
The ITUC ranked Cameroon a score of 4 on the Global Rights Index in 2024, due to its frequent repression of trade union leaders including arrests, union busting and restrictions on strikes.

Under the 1992 Labour Code, trade unions must be registered by the government, public sector teacher unions in particular have been rejected. Agriculture and informal workers – a majority of Cameroon workforce are excluded from joining or forming trade unions. Trade unions cannot mix both public and private sector workers. The right to strike

== History ==
In 1961, a unified Cameroon was established from French Cameroon and (British) Southern Cameroons. Throughout the 1960s over 100 trade unions were established. The first president, Ahmadou Ahidjo appealed for trade union unity.

4 trade union confederations, (USLC; Union des Syndicats Libres du Cameroun), (CGTC; Confédération Générale des Travailleurs Camerounais), (UGTC; Union Générale des Travailleurs Camerounais) and (USAC; Union des Syndicats Autonomes du Cameroun) merged into Trade Union Federation of Cameroon (FSC; Fédération Syndicale du Cameroun).

English speaking trade unions in Western Cameroon formed West Cameroon Trades Union Congress (WCTUC).

Separately, two Christian federations (UCTS; Union Camerounaise des Travailleurs Croyants) and (CCSC; Confédération Camerounaise des Syndicats Croyants) merged in 1962 to form (USCC; Union des Syndicats Croyants du Cameroun). USCC maintained its independence until it was merged into the UNTC (see below) at the urging of president Ahidjo in a 1969 congress of the ruling UNC party.

By 1971-1972, the remaining trade union confederations (including FSC, USCC and WCTUC) were consolidated into a single confederation which went through the following rebranded organizations:

- Unique Trade Union Center (CUT; French: Syndicat Central Unique)
- National Union of Cameroon Workers (UNTC; French: Union Nationale des Travailleurs du Caméroun) – 1972 formation
- Organization of Cameroon Workers' Union (OSTC; French: Organisation des Syndicats des Travailleurs du Camérounais)
- Confederation of Cameroon Trade Union (CSTC; French: Confédération Syndicale des Travailleurs du Caméroun)
  - Confederation of Independent Unions of Cameroon (French: Confédération des Syndicats Indépendants du Caméroun) – split by a former RDPC leader in 2000
  - Trade Union Confederation of National Workers of Cameroon (French: Confédération Syndicale Entente Nationale des Travailleurs du Caméroun) – split in 2001
  - Confederation of Autonomous Unions of Cameroon (CSAC; French: Confédération des Syndicats Autonomes du Cameroun) – split from CSTC in 2006

Prior to 1991, workers could only join trade unions that were affiliated to OSTC, which was closely linked to the national ruling party RDPC. Some leaders of OSTC even hosted "anti-democracy" rallies in 1990 during the liberalization period. In 1992, the OSTC restructured into the present day CSTC which promoted union democracy, e.g. the right of its members to affiliate with a political party of their choosing. The RDPC party continued to seek influence in CSTC. In 1994, the RDPC government officials unilaterally ousted and later arrested union democracy advocate and general secretary Louis Sambes. With external pressure from the global ICFTU and the ILO, Sambes was released and reinstated in 1995.

Following the government's failed attempt to oust Sambe and control CSTC, the RDPC set up a competing management union in 1995 called Union of Free Trade Unions of Cameroon (USLC; French: Union des Syndicates Libres du Cameroun).

Central Public Sector Union (CSP; French: Centrale Syndicale du Secteur Public) was founded in 2000 and represents 60,000 civil servants or one third of the Cameroon public sector workforce.

== See also ==
- 2016–17 Cameroonian protests
- 2008 Cameroonian anti-government protests
