= Trade unions in Togo =

- National organization(s): CNTT, CSTT, UNSIT, UGSL
- Total union membership: 255,240 (2017)
- Density: 7.4% (2017)

Global Rights Index
- 3 Regular violations of rights

International Labour Organization
- Togo is a member of the ILO

Convention ratification
- Freedom of Association: 7 June 1960
- Right to Organise: 8 November 1983

Trade unions in Togo first emerged under French colonial rule in the 1930s and 1940s. In the 1950s, unions separated from French structures as autonomous organisations. Following independence in 1960 there remained a pluralistic environment, however, with the military coup of Gnassingbé Eyadéma in 1968, all trade unions were dissolved into a single union under state control. This situation remained until the early 1990s when trade union plurality returned.

== Origins and autonomy ==
Limited trade union rights were granted in French West Africa in 1937 following the election victory of the Popular Front government in 1936. The General Confederation of Labour (CGT) was the first French trade union to engage in organising activities in West Africa, but these were halted due to the outbreak of World War II and the banning of trade unions during the Vichy Regime. Following the end of the War, the CGT created sections for West Africa, with a section for Togo established in 1946.

== Independence and suppression ==
From the early 1970s independent trade unionism was banned in Togo. In 1972 and 1973, the existing trade unions were dissolved into the CNTT and placed under government control. The Eyadéma regime banned strikes, gaoled union leaders, and replaced them with sycophants. In 1980, the CNTT was incorporated into the ruling party (the Rally of the Togolese People).

National Centres of Togo
Federation	Membership (2017)
National Confederation of Togolese Workers (CNTT)	117,327
Trade Union Confederation of Togolese Workers (CSTT)	84,093
Union Générale des Syndicats Libres (UGSL)	35,000
National Union of Independent Trade Unions of Togo (UNSIT)	9,050
Groupe des Syndicats Autonomes (GSA)	5,600
La Confédération Générale des Cadres (Syndicats Libres) du Togo (CGCT)	4,170
Synergie des Travailleurs du Togo (STT)	Unknown
