= United Workers Congress of Liberia =

The United Workers Congress of Liberia (abbreviated UWC) was a trade union centre in Liberia.

UWC was founded in 1974, after a split in the Congress of Industrial Organizations of Liberia. The most important CIO union, the National Mine Workers Union, joined the UWC. Amongst the mine workers UWC organized all mines except the Mano River Mine. Other sectors organized by UWC were timber workers, truck drivers and car mechanics.

Frank Walker served as the general secretary of UWC, Emett Harmon was its president and Esmael A. Sherif its executive vice-president. Harmon also served as Ambassador at Large. UWC was affiliated to the Organisation of African Trade Union Unity (OATUU). UWC participated in the second OATUU congress held in Tripoli, Libya in April 1976.

By 1976 UWC claimed a membership of 7,000, the National Mine Workers Union organizing 4,700 members, the Domestic and Allied Workers Union (DAWU) 1,700 members and the Wood and Timber Workers' Union 400 members.

In 1977 President William R. Tolbert Jr. urged the different trade union centres to unite into a single body. The Liberian Federation of Trade Unions (LFTU) was founded, but UWC stayed out of LFTU. In 1977, following labor agitations and accusations of corruption, the NMWU Local 3 (mine workers at LAMCO) broke away from UWC and formed an independent union.

In 1980 UWC and LFTU merged, forming the Liberian Federation of Labor Unions (LFLU).
