= SFWU =

SFWU may refer to:

- Service & Food Workers Union, a trade union in New Zealand
- Seychelles Federation of Workers' Unions, a national trade union center in Seychelles
