= Labor Congress of Liberia =

Trade union centre in Liberia

The Labor Congress of Liberia (abbreviated LCL) was a trade union centre in Liberia. It was one of the precursors of the Liberian Federation of Trade Unions (LFTU).

== 1951 foundation and 1954 re-foundation ==
LCL was founded as the first trade union centre in the country in 1951, but the organization soon became defunct. LCL was re-founded in February 1954, with Leroy Francis, a West Indian, playing a leading role. As of mid-1955 LCL had five affiliates: the General Workers' Union, the Dock Workers' Union, the Mine Workers' Union, the Railroad Workers' Union, and the Rubber Workers' Union. LCL claimed to have 50,000 members, although more conservative estimates put the number of due-paying members at around 1,000. Outside of Monrovia LCL established branches at Greenville, Sinoe County and Bomi Hills.

== 1955 strikes ==
In 1955 the LCL-affiliated GWU organized a strike of road construction workers, demanding increase in wages. Negotiations lasted for 8 weeks. The Liberian government took part in facilitating negotiations with the road construction company. Another 1955 strike, a strike at the Bomi Hills Mining Company, was put down by military police. The union leaders were jailed, and LCL went defunct.

== 1958 re-foundation ==
LCL was once again re-founded in 1958 by T. Dupigny-Leigh (Social Secretary in the Liberian government). Like the previous Labor Union of Liberia, LCL under Dupigny-Leigh was backed up by the Liberian government. LCL was led by William V.S. Tubman, Jr., the son of the Liberian president William Tubman. Union fees of LCL went directly to the governing True Whig Party. LCL was affiliated to ICFTU.

== 1959 split ==
In 1959 LCL underwent a split, and the break-away Congress of Industrial Organizations was formed. The split begun when the independent-minded Monrovia mechanics union moved away from the pro-government LCL. LCL was divided into the Leigh group (favoring close relations with the government) and the McGill group (favoring independent unions).

== Later period ==
LCL became largely defunct after the split. CIO overtook the membership in ICFTU. As of 1964 LCL was estimated to have around 1,000 members. As of the mid-1960s LCL reportedly had only one affiliated union, maintaining a presence amongst dock workers.

In 1977 President William R. Tolbert Jr. urged the different trade union centres to unite into a single body. The Liberian Federation of Trade Unions (LFTU) was founded, re-uniting LCL and CIO.
