= Trade unions in Burundi =

- National organization(s): COSYBU; CSB
- Union density: Under 3%

Global Rights Index
- 5+ No guarantee of rights due to breakdown of law

International Labour Organization
- Burundi is a member of the ILO

Convention ratification
- Freedom of Association: 25 June 1993
- Right to Organise: 10 October 1997

There are two main trade union confederations in Burundi; the Confederation of Trade Unions of Burundi (COSYBU) and the Trade Union Confederation of Burundi (CSB). Both are affiliated to the International Trade Union Confederation (ITUC).

== Repression ==
The ITUC ranked Burundi the worst possible score of 5+ in the Global Rights Index, a status shared by 11 other countries due its frequent repression of trade union leaders including arrests, union busting and usage of strike breakers.

== History ==
During Belgium colonial rule, African workers were not allowed to form or join trade unions until 1946. The trade unions that did form during this time were affiliated to the main two Belgium union confederations. The socialist General Labour Federation of Belgium (FGTB) ignored some of the restrictions on organizing African workers and by 1951 helped organized African and European workers in the affiliated FGTB-CBRU (French: Fédération Générale du Travail de Belgique-Congo Belge, Rwanda-Urundi) inside the shared colony of Belgium Congo/Ruanda-Urundi.

The Belgian Confederation of Christian Trade Unions established the Federation of Christian Workers' Unions and Rural Workers of Burundi (FSOCPB; Fédération des Syndicats de Chrétians Ouvriers et Paysans du Burundi) in 1958. Its membership was Hutu members only and driven underground in the 1960s.

Burundi reached independence from Belgium in 1962. Four trade union emerged from former Belgian trade unions, (SLTB; Syndicat Libre des Travailleurs du Burundi), (SAAB; Syndicat des Agents de l'Administration du Burundi) a civil-servant union, FTB; Fédération des Travailleurs du Burundi (formed in 1963 and banned in 1965) and (SCB; Syndicat Chrétian du Burundi).

In November 1966, Burundi came under military rule and by 1967, all previous unions were absorbed into the Union of Workers of Burundi (UTB; Union des Travailleurs du Burundi) which was Tutsi dominated and close to the single ruling party Union for National Progress.

In 1991 the present day Trade Union Confederation of Burundi (CSB) was established, followed by its smaller rival Burundi, Confederation of Trade Unions of Burundi (COSYBU) in 1995. Both are affiliated to the International Trade Union Confederation. There are 74 registered trade unions as of 2017; 36 are affiliated to CSB, 17 are affiliated to COSYBU and 21 are unaffiliated.

== See also ==
- Category:Trade unions in the Democratic Republic of the Congo
