= SWFU =

SWFU may refer to:

- Service & Food Workers Union Nga Ringa Tota (SFWU) is a trade union in New Zealand
- Seychelles Federation of Workers' Unions (SFWU) is a national trade union center in Seychelles
- Southwest Forestry University, in Kunming, Yunnan, China
- Star Wars: The Force Unleashed, video game published by LucasArts
