= Human rights in Togo =

Togo in West Africa is currently rated as "Partly Free" by Freedom House.

== Overview ==
In the past, the country was labeled "Not Free" by Freedom House from 1972 to 1998, and again from 2002 to 2006. It has been categorized as "Partly Free" from 1999 to 2001 and again from 2007 to the present (according to the government officials).

According to a U.S. State Department report based on conditions in 2010, problems include "security force use of excessive force, including torture, which resulted in deaths and injuries; official impunity; harsh and life-threatening prison conditions; arbitrary arrest and detention; lengthy pretrial detention; executive influence over the judiciary; infringement of citizens' privacy rights; restrictions on freedoms of press, assembly, and movement; official corruption; discrimination and violence against women; child abuse, including female genital mutilation (FGM), and sexual exploitation of children; regional and ethnic discrimination; trafficking in persons, especially women and children; societal discrimination against persons with disabilities; official and societal discrimination against homosexual persons; societal discrimination against persons with HIV; and forced labor, including by children."

The 2021 report notes improvements in the country's personal freedoms.

== Historical background ==
Togo, once a German protectorate, and later a French possession, won independence in 1960 and has been criticized for its human rights record ever since. Military leader Gnassingbe Eyadema took power in 1967; despite the legalization of political parties in 1991 and the ratification of a democratic constitution in 1992, the regime continued to be regarded as oppressive, and in 1993 the EU cut off aid in reaction to the regime's human rights offenses. After's Eyadema death in 2005 his son, Faure Gnassingbe, took over, then stood down and was elected in elections that were widely described as having been fixed and which occasioned violence that resulted in as many as 600 deaths and the flight from Togo of 40,000 refugees.

The following is a chart of Togo's ratings since 1972 in the Freedom in the World reports, published annually by Freedom House. A rating of 1 is "free"; 7, "not free".^{1}

Year	Political Rights	Civil Liberties	Status	President^{2}
1972	7	5	Not Free	Gnassingbé Eyadéma
1973	7	5	Not Free	Gnassingbé Eyadéma
1974	7	6	Not Free	Gnassingbé Eyadéma
1975	7	6	Not Free	Gnassingbé Eyadéma
1976	7	6	Not Free	Gnassingbé Eyadéma
1977	7	6	Not Free	Gnassingbé Eyadéma
1978	7	6	Not Free	Gnassingbé Eyadéma
1979	7	7	Not Free	Gnassingbé Eyadéma
1980	7	6	Not Free	Gnassingbé Eyadéma
1981	7	6	Not Free	Gnassingbé Eyadéma
1982^{3}	7	6	Not Free	Gnassingbé Eyadéma
1983	7	6	Not Free	Gnassingbé Eyadéma
1984	6	6	Not Free	Gnassingbé Eyadéma
1985	6	6	Not Free	Gnassingbé Eyadéma
1986	6	6	Not Free	Gnassingbé Eyadéma
1987	6	6	Not Free	Gnassingbé Eyadéma
1988	6	6	Not Free	Gnassingbé Eyadéma
1989	6	6	Not Free	Gnassingbé Eyadéma
1990	6	6	Not Free	Gnassingbé Eyadéma
1991	6	5	Not Free	Gnassingbé Eyadéma
1992	6	5	Not Free	Gnassingbé Eyadéma
1993	7	5	Not Free	Gnassingbé Eyadéma
1994	6	5	Not Free	Gnassingbé Eyadéma
1995	6	5	Not Free	Gnassingbé Eyadéma
1996	6	5	Not Free	Gnassingbé Eyadéma
1997	6	5	Not Free	Gnassingbé Eyadéma
1998	6	5	Not Free	Gnassingbé Eyadéma
1999	5	5	Partly Free	Gnassingbé Eyadéma
2000	5	5	Partly Free	Gnassingbé Eyadéma
2001	5	5	Partly Free	Gnassingbé Eyadéma
2002	6	5	Not Free	Gnassingbé Eyadéma
2003	6	5	Not Free	Gnassingbé Eyadéma
2004	6	5	Not Free	Gnassingbé Eyadéma
2005	6	5	Not Free	Gnassingbé Eyadéma
2006	6	5	Not Free	Faure Gnassingbé
2007	5	5	Partly Free	Faure Gnassingbé
2008	5	5	Partly Free	Faure Gnassingbé
2009	5	4	Partly Free	Faure Gnassingbé
2010	5	4	Partly Free	Faure Gnassingbé
2011	5	4	Partly Free	Faure Gnassingbé
2012	5	4	Partly Free	Faure Gnassingbé
2013	5	4	Partly Free	Faure Gnassingbé
2014	4	4	Partly Free	Faure Gnassingbé
2015	4	4	Partly Free	Faure Gnassingbé
2016	4	4	Partly Free	Faure Gnassingbé
2017	4	4	Partly Free	Faure Gnassingbé
2018	4	4	Partly Free	Faure Gnassingbé
2019	5	4	Partly Free	Faure Gnassingbé
2020	5	4	Partly Free	Faure Gnassingbé
2021	5	4	Partly Free	Faure Gnassingbé
2022	5	4	Partly Free	Faure Gnassingbé
2023	5	4	Partly Free	Faure Gnassingbé

== Basic rights ==
Togo's constitution and laws forbid discrimination "based on race, gender, religion, disability, language, or social status", but these prohibitions are not adequately enforced. Although Togo's constitution and laws guarantee freedom of speech and of the press, there are considerable restrictions on those rights, with many journalists being fined or sued for defamation, and some engaging in self-censorship to avoid lawsuits or violent reprisals. Libel fines can be as high as 5 million CFA francs (US$10,000), and the number of libel cases and convictions, especially involving statements about the president and his family, peaked in 2010. In 2011, journalists formed "SOS Journalists in Danger" after several of them were named in an anonymous note, supposedly from the government, which threatened torture and physical abuse.

According to a 2012 report by Freedom House, the size of Togo's private media sector "is impressive for a relatively small country, and its content is often highly politicized. There are approximately 30 privately owned newspapers that publish with some regularity, including 2 dailies, about 100 private radio stations...and 8 independent television stations." Print media do not require official licenses, but "[p]ervasive impunity for crimes against journalists has created an illiberal media environment marked by self-censorship that persisted during the tense election year of 2010 and only improved marginally in 2011".

The High Authority of Audiovisuals and Communications (HAAC) is supposed to be an independent agency that protects freedom of the press, in fact it censors the media on behalf of the government, and has the power to suspend newspapers for six months and to confiscate journalists' press cards and equipment. Also, radio stations cannot retransmit foreign programs without HAAC approval. Still, much of the press is very critical of the government, while government-owned media are heavily biased in its favor. Although the private media has grown in the last decade or so, the government still owns the media outlets with the largest audiences, including the only nationwide TV station.

In 2012, the HAAC suspended the call-in shows on Légende FM, an order that was backed up by a magistrate in Lomé. The station's news director, Guy Mario, said that it "was being punished for its shows in June in which callers had criticized the violent crackdown by security forces on anti-government protests in Lomé....Mario said that the programs, which ran for nine days, featured participants criticizing the government in uncensored language." The station was not given the chance to defend itself in court, which is contrary to Togolese law. "We were never informed, invited, or summoned to the tribunal – neither us nor our lawyers," Mario said.

During the 2010 presidential election campaign, French journalists were denied accreditation until election day; the situation on this front improved in 2011.

There are no restrictions on, or monitoring of, Internet use. A security force is maintained at the University of Lome to intimidate academics, and undercover government informants attend classes. While Togo's constitution and laws guarantee freedom of assembly, it is generally restricted, with the government preventing meetings of its opponents and using force, including deadly force, to disperse anti-government demonstrations. Likewise, though Togo technically guarantees the right to move freely around the country, travel abroad, emigrate, and repatriate, these rights are also restricted in practice, with armed forces manning checkpoints around the country at which they arbitrarily search travelers and demand bribes.

In May 2012, a law was passed requiring prior notification of public demonstrations. In the same year, security forces used excessive force to disperse a number of demonstrators, and the head of the ANC was subjected to house arrest to keep him from taking part in protests. Student activists connected to the Mouvement pour l'épanouissement des étudiants togolais (Movement for the development of Togolese students, MEET) were arrested, wounded by rubber bullets, and generally abused.

Corruption is a crime, but is rarely punished. According to the World Bank's Worldwide Governance Indicators for 2009, government corruption was a severe problem. Corruption was common among prison officials, police officers, and members of the judiciary. The 2005 presidential election was rife with fraud, intimidation, and violence, but the 2010 election was relatively peaceful and was considered generally free and fair.

The opposition began holding protests in April demanding electoral reforms, calling for an end to the Gnassingbé dynasty, and insisting on respect for human rights. Government security forces brutally put down several demonstrations in mid 2012. In October 2012, a sociology student described the situation as "very worrying", noting that the opposition "is hardening its stance and the government doesn't seem to be listening". A former economy and finance minister said at the same time that the Togolese people "are angry about the government's slip-ups in terms of human rights, acting arbitrarily and using the judiciary to cling to power".

In Togo, where 33 percent of the population is animist, 28 percent Catholic, 14 percent Sunni Muslim, and 10 percent Protestant, and where both Christian and Muslim holy days are national holidays, there have been no reports in recent years of abuses of religious freedom or of discrimination based on religious affiliation. Members of different religions regularly invite one another to worship services, according to a 2012 U.S. State Department report on religious freedom, which also notes that religious intermarriage is common.

== Human rights groups ==
Human rights groups in Togo include the Togolese League of Human Rights, the Center for Observation and Promotion of the Rule of Law, and the Togolese Association for the Defense and Protection of Human Rights. Although these groups, as well as many of their international counterparts, are allowed to operate in Togo, the government usually pays no heed to their recommendations. The national assembly also has a human rights committee, but it plays a minimal role.

En aucun cas (lit. 'under no circumstances') raises awareness of human rights issues in Togo. Its leader, Foly Satchivi, has been arrested on multiple occasions because of his activism.

== Women's rights ==
Rape is widespread and is a crime punishable by up to 10 years in prison, sometimes 20 years, for example in cases of child rape or gang rape. Victims tend not to report rapes owing to stigma and fear of reprisal. Spousal rape is not a crime, nor is domestic violence, although it is also widespread. Police tend not to get involved in domestic abuse, the government has no official program to address it, and women are unaware of their rights in such situations. Sexual harassment is also widespread, and though it is technically illegal the law against it is not enforced.

Families have the right to plan children as they wish. Under the law women are equal, but they suffer social and official discrimination on a variety of fronts, thanks to the enforcement of traditional laws. For example, husbands have the right to tell their wives not to work and have control over the money they earn. Although legally women are entitled to equal pay, this law is not respected in most sectors. Women can own property, but are not entitled to child support or any other payments if they divorce and do not have a right to inherit their husbands' property. Polygamy is common. It is the job of the Ministry of Social Action and National Solidarity to ensure that women know what their rights are.

== Children's rights ==
Female genital mutilation has been illegal since 1998, but the law is rarely enforced. According to the U.S. State Department, in 2010 the procedure was performed on about 6 percent of girls. A 2012 report by the German Federal Office for Migration and Asylum noted that the "abolition" of FGM "was officially announced and celebrated at a national ceremony in Sokodé on 29 and 30 December 2012". Thanks in part to a German NGO that has run nationwide information campaigns about FGM, and actively sought to help FGM practitioners find other work, "there has been a continual decline in female genital mutilation." The German report puts the rate of FGM in girls under 14 at 0.7 percent in 2008 and, contrary to the U.S. State Department report, at 0.4 percent in 2010." In 2012 it was believed to be even lower.

According to the 2021 United States Department of Labor report on human trafficking, Togo is a destination and source country for trafficking. The main form of trafficking into the country is for forced labour in agriculture and quarries. Within Togo, traffickers often recruit children from the northern part of the country to work in the capital city of Lomé as street vendors, servants, sex workers, or jobs involving hazardous machinery. Travel restrictions and curfews imposed due to the COVID-19 pandemic significantly increased vulnerability of children to trafficking.

== Disabled people's rights ==
Discrimination against people with disabilities is illegal, but this law is not well-enforced. Although many buildings have wheelchair ramps, there is no law requiring that public buildings be wheelchair-accessible, and inaccessible buildings or transportation can interfere with voting and civic participation. Children with disabilities often have access to education, including at schools for people with disabilities. There is a Ministry of Social Action, Women’s Empowerment and Literacy that runs awareness campaigns, offers job training, and distributes food and clothing.

== LGBT rights ==
The national law stipulates that "acts against nature committed with an individual of one’s sex", generally understood to refer to homosexuality, are punishable by up to three years in prison, but this is rarely enforced in practice; prosecutions of LGBT people are ofted predicated on other offenses, such as public urination. Transgender people do not have the right to change gender on government-issued identification documents. There is also widespread societal and institutional discrimination against LGBT people.

== HIV/AIDS rights ==
Discrimination against persons with HIV/AIDS is illegal, but widespread. The National Council for the Fight against AIDS exists to combat discrimination through training on HIV/AIDS and awareness campaigns. Family members are commonly ostracized after diagnosis with HIV, and many Togolese believe that HIV/AIDS is a form of cosmic punishment for wrongdoing.

== Employees' rights ==
Workers have the right to join unions, and most have the right to strike and bargain collectively, within certain limitations. Anti-union discrimination, forced labor and child labor are illegal, but these laws are not well enforced. Many children work as beggars, servants, farm laborers, and at other jobs, the most dangerous being in quarries, with some of them essentially being slaves, while many women are forced to work as prostitutes or domestics. Although employing children under 15 is illegal, some children as young as five years old are in employment. The Ministry of Social Action and National Solidarity is supposed to enforce the law against child labor, but enforcement is weak. There are minimum wages for various types of work, but they are very low and unenforced. There are also laws restricting work hours and the like, but these tend to be ignored and unforced.

According to a 2012 report by the U.S. Department of Labor, "Togo made a minimal advancement in efforts to eliminate the worst forms of child labor" in 2011, with local child labor committees expanding their efforts "by tracking the return of trafficking victims and improved coordination by sharing information with government officials during the reporting period". Also, Togo's government cooperates with "donor-funded projects to combat the worst forms of child labor and operates a hotline to report child abuse". Still, Togo has yet to devote "sufficient resources to enforce its child labor laws effectively" and minors "continue to work in dangerous conditions".

== Religious rights ==
In 2022, Freedom House rated Togo's religious freedom as 3 out of 4, noting that religious freedom is constitutionally protected and generally respected in practice. Islam, Catholicism and Protestantism are recognised by the state; other groups must register as religious associations to receive similar benefits. The registration process has been subject to long delays with almost 900 applications pending at the beginning of 2021.

== Rights of refugees and asylum-seekers ==
Togo works with international organizations to aid refugees, asylum seekers, and others. Although its laws do not provide for granting asylum or refugee status, the government has set up a system for providing for such persons. As of 2010 several hundred refugees from Ghana were living in Togo.

== Rights of persons under arrest ==
Police beat suspects during interrogation, routinely and with impunity. Even children are in danger of being beaten in such situations. Although arbitrary arrest and detention are against the law and constitution, they occur nonetheless. As a rule, the police are ineffective and corrupt, and routinely get away with abuses. While a variety of public officials are empowered to issue arrest warrants, persons are still often arrested without warrants and detained secretly. Although the law stipulates that persons in detention have the right to be told of the charges against them and forbids detention without charges for more than 48 (or, sometimes, 96) hours, these rules are often ignored. Political opponents of the government are often arrested arbitrarily. Debtors are also often arrested, also this too is against the law.

== Rights of persons on trial ==
In 2007, victims of abuse during the 2005 elections had to pay a sum to the court in exchange for having their cases moved forward. Some of those who paid did not get anything in return. Owing partly to a shortage of judges and other qualified judicial officials, defendants are often kept in pretrial detention for long periods, which sometimes are longer than the terms they would have been sentenced to if put on trial and found guilty. One example is the case of Abdoul-Aziz Goma, an Irish-Togolese dual citizen who has been held in pre-trial detention for more than three years, starting in 2018.

Also, there is considerable judicial corruption, with the executive branch exerting influence over judges, and lawyers bribing judges. Judges who support the ruling party are given higher positions than those who support an independent judiciary. There is no presumption of innocence; there is trial by jury; trials are open. Defendants have the right to an attorney, and are provided with one if they cannot afford to pay. This and other rights are generally respected in practice, but defendants' right to see government evidence is not. In rural villages, chiefs or elders are empowered to try minor cases.

A young British human-rights volunteer in Togo describes attending a trial at which he was pressed into service as a translator.

== Rights of persons in prison ==
Prison guards beat inmates, also routinely and with impunity. Prisons are overcrowded and unsanitary, with unsatisfactory food and medical care; sick prisoners must pay guards in order to receive treatment in the infirmary, and also pay fees to shower, use toilet facilities, or have a cot. Sexual harassment of female inmates is common. Prisoners are allowed to see visitors and practice their religions. They are also allowed to file complaints, but authorities generally do nothing in response. Investigations of prison conditions are rare, although groups like the Red Cross are allowed to inspect prison facilities. The Ministry of Justice is purportedly administrating a long-term prison reform program, the Urgent Prison Support Program, funded by the EU, but it has changed little. In June 2010, Togo abolished the death penalty, and all persons who had been sentenced to death had their sentences commuted to life imprisonment.

A 2012 report by Integrated Regional Information Network (IRIN) said that "Togo's 12 prisons – many of them dilapidated – hold more than twice their designed capacity. The congestion, as well as inadequate food, medical care and poor hygiene have led to diseases and deaths". Most of the inmates are people awaiting trial, half of whom have not been charged. The report quoted one prisoner as saying: "We sleep very close to one another, with our heads on someone else's feet, like sardines in a tin. At night we sleep in shifts, while some lie down, the others stand against the wall waiting impatiently for their turn." For example, the prison in Lomé is built to house 600 prisoners, but actually holds more than 1,800.

The watchdog group Atlas of Torture ranked Togo the world's fourth worst country when it came to the number of detainees waiting to be tried. IRIN also noted that some persons who are ordered by the courts to be released continue to be held in prison.

== See also ==
- Human trafficking in Togo
- Internet censorship and surveillance in Togo
- LGBT rights in Togo
- Matter of Kasinga, a 1996 U.S. legal case involving a Togolese teenager seeking asylum to escape a tribal practice of female genital mutilation.

== Notes ==
1.Note that the "Year" signifies the "Year covered". Therefore the information for the year marked 2008 is from the report published in 2009, and so on.
2.As of January 1.
3.The 1982 report covers the year 1981 and the first half of 1982, and the following 1984 report covers the second half of 1982 and the whole of 1983. In the interest of simplicity, these two aberrant "year and a half" reports have been split into three year-long reports through extrapolation.
