= CSTM =

CSTM may refer to:

- Canada Science and Technology Museum
- College of Saint Thomas More, a small liberal arts college located in Fort Worth, Texas.
- Workers' Trade Union Confederation of Mali
- The Mumbai metro station code for Chhatrapati Shivaji Maharaj Terminus metro station, Mumbai, Maharashtra, India
