= Trade unions in Uganda =

- National organization(s): COFTU, NOTU
- Regulatory authority: Ministry of Gender, Labour and Social Development
- Primary legislation: Labour Unions Act (2006)
- Total union membership: 968,950 (2019)
- Density: 15% (2019)
- CBA Coverage: 15% (2018)

Global Rights Index
- 4 Systematic violations of rights

International Labour Organization
- Uganda is a member of the ILO

Convention ratification
- Freedom of Association: 2 June 2005
- Right to Organise: 4 June 1963

Trade unions in Uganda have existed since the 1930s. For much of Uganda's history trade union activities have been greatly shaped by national politics and by events external to the country's labour movement. The experiences of trade unions in Uganda fall into four periods: during the British colonial period (to 1962), from independence to the rise to power of Idi Amin (1962-1971), the Idi Amin dictatorship (1971-1979) and through to the present.

== Uganda Protectorate ==
The first unions emerged with the formation of the Uganda African Motor Drivers' Association in 1939. The Uganda Trade Union Congress (UTUC), founded in 1955, was the country's first national centre.

== Independence ==
As trade unions grew in the late 1950s and early 1960s, workers from outside Uganda became involved. This was especially the case of Kenyan workers fleeing British repression during the Mau Mau Uprising. The newly independent government was fearful of the infusion of Kenyan workers who were perceived to be militant and framed trade union law in ways which were considered more draconian than during the colonial period. For example, non-Ugandans were banned from holding any position within a trade union.

== Trade unions in contemporary Uganda ==
During the second decade of the 21st Century, NOTU emerged as the largest national trade union. While initially struggling to be relevant and undergoing significant internal divisions between 2000 and 2010, by 2018 the confederation had absorbed unions which had broken away from rival COFTU and increased membership through organising. Between 2010 and 2018, NOTU's membership grew by more than three times and represents more than 90% of organised workers in Uganda. The growth is largely attributed to the organization of informal workers.
