= MCTU =

MCTU may refer to:

- Malawi Congress of Trade Unions
- Ministry of Training, Colleges and Universities, part of the Ministry of Education (Ontario)
- Marine Corps Test Unit #1
