= Amos Gray =

Liberian trade unionist (born 1933)

Amos N. Gray (born 3 March 1933, date of death unknown) was a Liberian trade unionist. Born in Pull River, Maryland County, Gray attended primary school in Pull River and secondary school in Harper. He attended college in Monrovia, studying social studies for two years and law for one year. During his college years he worked part-time at the Freeport of Monrovia. Working at the port in 1960, he joined the Maritime and Dock Workers Union. After his college years he worked at the Maritime and Dock Workers Union office in Monrovia.

In 1961, he studied at the Tel Aviv Afro-Asian Institute for Labour Studies and Cooperation for six months. In the same year he participated in the Liberian delegation to the All African Trade Union Congress in Casablanca, later participating the subsequent All African Trade Union Congress in Dakar were the African Trade Union Confederation was established.

In 1964, the Congress of Industrial Organizations of Liberia sent Gray to the ICFTU AFRO conference in Addis Ababa, where Gray was elected to the AFRO Executive Board.

On 19 February 1965, Gray was elected as president of the Petroleum, Oil and Chemical Workers' Union of Liberia. In the same year Gray led the Liberian delegation at the 8th ICFTU world congress in Amsterdam.

Gray served as the CIO Assistant Secretary-General in 1967, and he was later chosen to become its general secretary.

In December 1969, Gray was the workers' delegate from Liberia at the Third African Regional Conference of the International Labour Organization, held in Accra.

Gray was the sole Liberian delegate at the 6th International Federation of Petroleum and Chemical Workers world congress held in Istanbul in 1970. Gray was elected vice president of IFCPW at the meeting. In 1972 he was elected to the ICFTU Executive Board, as an alternate member representing Africa.

When CIO and LCL merged into the Liberian Federation of Trade Unions in 1977, Gray became the LFTU secretary-general.

When LFTU and UWC merged into the Liberian Federation of Labor Unions in 1980, Gray was elected its secretary-general, and he was re-elected at the second LFLU convention held in Monrovia in May 1988. Gray was the Liberian workers delegate at the 1989 International Labour Conference held in Geneva.

Gray represented LFLU at the All-Liberia National Conference held in Virginia, March–April 1991. Here he seconded Prince Yormie Johnson's nomination of Dr. Peter Naigow as interim Vice President of Liberia.

Gray died prior to April 2004.
