= LFLU =

LFLU may refer to:

- Liberian Federation of Labor Unions
- Valence-Chabeuil Airport in France, ICAO code LFLU
