= Kamadji Demba Karyom =

Chadian Court clerk, sociologist, trade unionist and activist

- Born: Chad
- Occupations: Trade unionist, sociologist, court clerk
- Organization(s): Union of Trade Union of chad (UST); Federation of Public Sector Trade Unions of Chad; Tournons La Page – Tchad
- Known for: Labor activism and pro-democracy advocacy

Kamadji Demba Karyom is a Chadian Court clerk, sociologist, trade unionist and activist known for her involvement in labour movement and pro-democracy in Chad.

== Early life and education ==
Kamadji Demba Karyom is trained as a sociologist and works as a court clerk. She has also actively been involved in some political and social issues in Chad, mainly that of the labor right and women's empowerment.

== Career ==
Karyom is a member of the Union of Trade Unions of Chad (UST) and the Federation of Public Sector Trade Unions of Chad (FSPT), She also serves on the independent anti-corruption authority.

She also served as the president of the Women's Committee of the Court Clerks' Union (Synagref), where she promotes women participation in union leadership. She is a member of the civil society movement (Tournons La Page-Chad) which advocates for democratic government and political reform.

== Activism ==
Karyom is known for her opposition to the government of the former president Idriss Déby and has been involved in protests austerity measures and restrictions of union freedom.

She has participated in several international conferences, mostly in Europe, where she spoke about labour rights, political repression in Chad, and the role of foreign military presence in Africa.

== Recognition ==
She is considered one of the emerging female leaders in Chad's trade union movement and has been highlighted international media for her activism.
