= Tanzania Teachers' Union =

- Chama cha Walimu Tanzania
- Wajibu na Haki (English: Responsibilities & Rights)
- Abbreviation: TTU, CWT
- Established: 1993; 33 years ago
- Type: Trade union
- Headquarters: Dodoma
- Location: Tanzania
- Field: Teaching
- Members: 200,000
- Affiliations: Federation of East African Teachers' Unions, TUCTA
- Website: www.ttu.or.tz

The Tanzania Teachers’ Union, TTU (Swahili: Chama cha Walimu Tanzania, CWT) is a teachers' trade union in Tanzania.

== History ==
The union was formed in 1993 with the intent of advocating and promoting the rights of teachers in Tanzania.

In 2006, the union's president Margaret Simwanza Sitta was appointed as Minister of Education and Vocational Training by President Jakaya Kikwete.

The union had observer status at the 17th Ordinary African Union Summit in 2011.

In 2012, 200,000 teachers went on strike after 95.7 percent of Union members voted in favour. Union chairman Gratian Mukoba said that a pay rise was necessary.

In May 2017, the union condemned the sacking of 10,000 civil servants.

== Leadership ==
Leah Ulaya is the current union president. Christopher Banda is the Vice President.

Ezekiah Oluoch was the deputy secretary general.

== See also ==
- Trade unions in Tanzania
