= Rose Omamo =

Kenyan trade unionist

Rose Aumo Omamo is a Kenyan trade unionist.

Omamo worked for nearly thirty years on a car and bus assembly line in Mombasa. One of only two women working in the plant, she decided to protect her rights by joining the Amalgamated Union of Kenya Metal Workers (AUKMW) and becoming a shop steward. She also became active in local networks of professional workers. When her husband died, she was pressured to marry her brother-in-law, but refused to do so, instead taking a second job to support her children.

In 2011, Omamo was elected as president of the AUKMW's Mombasa branch. As the union's second-largest branch, this was a prominent role, and she was regarded as highly familiar with labour law and able to effectively use it to argue for workers' rights. In 2012, she also won a seat on the national executive of the Central Organization of Trade Unions. Through this, she became known as a champion of women participating equally in the labour market and also in the trade union movement. She was soon elected to the women's committee of the African Regional Organisation of the International Trade Union Confederation.

In 2016, Omamo stood to become general secretary of the AUKMW. Although the incumbent, Justus Maina Otakwa, tried to intimidate some of her supporters and to change the rules of the election, Omamo won the election, by 28 delegate votes to 24. She was the first women to lead the union, 90% of whose members were men.

During the COVID-19 pandemic, Omamo campaigned for financial support for workers in the informal economy, and protections for workers unable to make loan repayments.

Trade union offices
Preceded by Justus Maina Otakwa	General Secretary of the Amalgamated Union of Kenya Metal Workers; 2016–present	Succeeded by Incumbent
