= MTUC =

MTUC may refer to:

- Malaysian Trades Union Congress
- Mauritius Trade Union Congress
