= CNTS =

CNTS or cnts may refer to:

- Confédération Nationale des Travailleurs Sénégalais
- Carbon nanotubes
