= 17th Ordinary African Union Summit =

The 17th Ordinary African Union Summit was held 28 June 2011 through 1 July 2011 in Malabo, the capital city of the Equatorial Guinea. In addition to the meeting of AU heads of state, the AU summit in Malabo included the 19th Ordinary Session of the Executive Council and the 22nd Ordinary Session of the Permanent Representatives Committee (PRC).

== Background ==
In January 2011, Equatorial Guinea President Teodoro Obiang Nguema Mbasogo’s election to the African Union presidency was announced by his predecessor Malawian President Bingu wa Mutharika at a heads-of-state summit in Addis Ababa, Ethiopia’s capital. Under AU rules, the bloc’s political leadership rotates annually between Africa’s five geographic regions. In a resolution adopted at the close of their 16th summit, the heads of State and government said African foreign affairs ministers would meet in the Equatorial Guinea’s capital, Malabo, on 26–27 June 2011. Held under the theme: "Accelerating Youth Empowerment for Sustainable Development", the Ordinary Session of the Summit of the African Union officially began on Thursday June 23, 2011, with the 22nd Ordinary Session of the Permanent Representatives Committee (PRC).

== Accommodation ==
Delegates at the summit were accommodated in a purpose built deluxe "city", which according to Human Rights Watch was built at a cost of $830 million, located 20 minutes from Malabo. The complex included "52 luxury presidential villas, a conference hall, artificial beach, luxury hotel and the county's first 18-hole golf course" as well as "a landing strip, heliport, hospital and buildings for banquets and events". NGOs criticised the development, calling it a "misplaced priority" for the government, considering the average income of people in Equatorial Guinea is below $1 a day.

== AU Delegations ==
- Algeria
- Angola
- Benin
- Botswana
- Burkina Faso
- Burundi
- Cameroon
- Cape Verde
- Central African Republic
- Chad
- Comoros
- Dem. Rep. of the Congo
- Rep. of the Congo
- Côte d'Ivoire
- Djibouti
- Egypt
- Equatorial Guinea
- Eritrea
- Ethiopia
- Gabon
- Gambia
- Ghana
- Guinea
- Guinea-Bissau
- Kenya
- Lesotho
- Liberia
- Libya
- Madagascar
- Malawi
- Mali
- Mauritania
- Mauritius
- Mozambique
- Namibia
- Niger
- Nigeria
- Rwanda
- Sahrawi Arab Dem. Rep.
- São Tomé and Príncipe
- Senegal
- Seychelles
- Sierra Leone
- Somalia
- South Africa
- Sudan
- Swaziland
- Tanzania
- Togo
- Tunisia
- Uganda
- United Arab Emirates
- Zambia
- Zimbabwe

=== Observers ===
At the invitation of the African Citizens and Diaspora Organization Directorate of the African Union Commission (CIDO), the following organizations had observer status for the 19th Ordinary Session of the Executive Council and the 17th Ordinary Session of the Assembly of the African Union:

- Save the Children International
- Centre for the Study of Violence and Reconciliation
- Youth Partnership for Peace and Development
- Friedrich Ebert Stiftung (FES)
- Tanzania Teachers’ Union (TTU)
- KwaZulu Natal Refugee Council
- Strategic Initiative for Women in the Horn of Africa (SIHA Network)
- First Steps Network (FSN)
- Union des personnes handicapées du Burundi (UPHB)
- Femmes Africa Solidarité (FAS)
- Water Aid (WABF)
- Development Network of Indigenous voluntary Associations (DENIVA)
- Zimbabwe Youth Organizations Network
- Consortium for Refugees and Migrants in South Africa (CoRMSA)
- African Council of Religious Leaders
- IPAS, Africa
- The General Forum for Arab-African Non-Governmental Organization
- Oxfam International

== 22nd Ordinary Session of the Permanent Representatives Committee (PRC) ==
Held under the theme: "Accelerating Youth Empowerment for Sustainable Development", the Ordinary Session of the Summit of the African Union began Thursday June 23, 2011, with the 22nd Ordinary Session of the Permanent Representatives Committee (PRC). The Ambassadors of the AU Member States met 23–24 June 2011 at their 22nd Ordinary Session. There they shared views on the report of the PRC sub-committees, budgetary and financial matters on the draft budget for 2012, and on the status of implementation of the new AU staff regulations and rules.

== 19th Ordinary Session of the Executive Council ==
The 19th Ordinary Session of the Executive Council included Ministers of External Affairs who exchanged views on various reports of the ministerial meetings organised by the AU Commission during the last six months. The Executive Council proceeded to the election of one member of the African Union Commission on International Law (AUCIL) and five Members of the African Commission on Human and Peoples' Rights (ACHPR). During the discussions, Ministers considered reports issued by the following African Union entities:

- The African Committee of Experts on the Rights and Welfare of the Child (ACERWC)
- The Pan-African Parliament (PAP)
- African Commission on Human and Peoples' Rights (ACHPR)
- The African Union Advisory Board on Corruption
- The African Union Commission on International Law (AUCIL)
- The General Assembly of ECOSOCC

=== Heads of State ===
Heads of States convened from 30 June - 1 July 2011 in Malabo to adopt decisions and recommendations of the 19th Ordinary Session of the Executive Council as well as the declarations of the summit. Presidents also agreed on the date and venue of the 18th Ordinary Session of the Assembly of the Union. Prior to the meeting, Nigerian President Goodluck Jonathan told Bloomberg's Franz Wild of his intention to discuss with the AU delegation from Algeria a timeline for constructing a trans-Sahara pipeline to take natural gas to Europe. Among the decisions reached by African Union leaders was to propose ceasefire talks in Addis Ababa, Ethiopia between the Libyan government and Libyan rebels. The proposal for Libya called for international peace keepers to monitor the cease-fire and asked the United Nations Security Council to lift a freeze on Libyan assets.
