= Foly Satchivi =

Togolese human rights activist

- Citizenship: Togo
- Occupation: Human rights activist
- Organization: En aucun cas
- Criminal charges: Apology for crime Disturbance of public order
- Criminal penalty: 36 months imprisonment
- Criminal status: Released

Foly Satchivi is a Togolese human rights activist. The leader and spokesperson of the human rights group En aucun cas, Satchivi has been detained on multiple occasions as a result of his activism.

== Biography ==
Satchivi is the leader and spokesperson of En aucun cas (lit. 'under no circumstances'), a student organisation that raises awareness of human rights issues in Togo, particularly those that happen in rural areas. This includes posting video reports on human rights abuses and criticisms of Togolese authorities. As a result of his visible role within the organisation, Satchivi has experienced threats and smears.

On 22 August 2018, Satchivi was arrested while travelling to a conference in Bè-Gakpoto that had been ruled as being illegal by Togolese authorities; on the same day, his home and workplace were seized with multiple items seized by the police. On 16 January 2019, Satchivi was sentenced to 36 months' imprisonment, with 12 months suspended, by the Lomé Criminal Court for "apology for crime and offences" and "aggravated disturbance of public order".

The World Organisation Against Torture and the International Federation for Human Rights issued a joint statement raising concerns about Satchivi's imprisonment, stating its belief that this had been in response to his peaceful human rights activism. On 10 October 2019, Satchivi's sentence was reduced on appeal to 28 months, with six months suspended. On 16 October, Satchivi was released from prison after receiving a pardon from Faure Gnassingbé, the President of Togo.

After his release, Satchivi maintained a low profile and did not make public appearances. However, by 2025 he had resumed posting videos online, and in June he took part in widespread protests in Lomé against the Gnassingbé government.

On 7 July 2025, Satchivi was arrested at his home in Bè by masked and armed plainclothes officers; a warrant was allegedly not issued for the arrest. Satchivi was taken into the custody of the Central Directorate of the Judicial Police, before being transferred on 11 July to Lomé Civil Prison. Satchivi continued to be detained without charge or public comment from Togolese authorities, leading to him taking part in a six-day hunger strike in late July.

Satchivi was subsequently charged with "spreading false news", "disturbing public order" and "inciting revolt", and remains in pre-trial detention as of September 2024. His request for provisional release was denied. Front Line Defenders expressed concerns that Satchivi's arrest was linked to the "peaceful expression of his rights to freedom of expression and assembly" and reported that he had been denied medical treatment despite having a chronic gastric ulcer and respiratory problems.
