= Sadok Allouche =

Tunisian trade union leader

Sadok Allouche (died October 2025) was a Tunisian trade union leader.

Allouche became a civil servant, working on the Caissobacto social security fund. In 1947, he joined the Tunisian General Labour Union (UGTT), and was active in the 1947 Sfax strike. He completed a bachelor's degree and then a master's degree in law, and rose to become director of Caissobacto.

Within the UGTT, Allouche rose to become head of labour relations. From 1963 to 1968, he worked in Brussels as first assistant to the general secretary of the International Confederation of Free Trade Unions (ICFTU). By 1973, he had returned to Tunisia, where he was elected as deputy general secretary of the UGTT, and also became the founding vice president of the Tunisian Human Rights League.

In 1978, Allouche was imprisoned for opposing the ruling Socialist Destourian Party government. When he was released, he helped re-establish the UGTT. In 1985, the UGTT agreed to appoint Allouche as its general secretary, as part of a deal which included the release of imprisoned trade unionists. Allouche was elected as president of the ICFTU African Regional Organisation in 1988, serving until 1993.

Trade union offices
Preceded by Boniface Kabore	President of the ICFTU African Regional Organisation; 1988–1993	Succeeded by Madia Diop
