= Madia Diop =

Madia Diop (3 October 1928 – 11 November 2008) was a Senegalese trade union leader and political activist.

Born in Bambey, Diop was educated locally and then in Thiès, where his teacher was the prominent trade unionist Doudou Ngom. He worked from an early age at Vézia, alongside his father. After completing his studies, he moved to Dakar to work in sales. He moved back to Thiès in 1947, to work on the railway, and he joined the trade union, in which he worked alongside Biram Touré.

In 1951, Diop began working as an accountant for the Société des Brasseries de l'Ouest africain, joining the General Confederation of Labour. He took part in the 1952 general strike which led to the adoption of the Overseas Labour Code, and led his union branch from 1954. He was a founder of the Food Industries Workers' Trade Union in 1956, an executive committee of the General Union of Workers of Black Africa from 1957, and the main founder of the Senegalese Workers' Union.

Diop was also politically active, joining the Senegalese Democratic Union, then in 1958 was one of the founders of the African Regroupment Party – Senegal (PRA), within which he campaigned for the country's independence, while being an opponent of Léopold Sédar Senghor. He stood as an opposition candidate in the 1963 Senegalese general election. During the campaign, he was one of the main organisers of a demonstration which was fired on by army, leaving ten people dead. Diop was framed for the murders and sentenced to 20 years' hard labour. In January 1964, he escaped from prison and disguised himself as a mechanic, reaching Mali by train. He remained there until 1966, when the PRA joined the government, and secured a pardon for Diop.

Back in Dakar, Diop founded the National Union of Workers of Senegal (UNTS). In 1968, he called for a general strike in support of student protests. The movement was defeated, and Diop was interned. The UNTS was dissolved, and a more moderate National Confederation of Senegalese Workers (CNTS) was established in its place. Diop was not a founding member, but decided soon afterwards to join the new federation, and in 1970, he was elected as general secretary of its Dakar regional federation.

In 1980, Senghor stood down, and Diop used the transition to launch a campaign for reform of the CNTS. This culminated in 1983, with his election as general secretary of the federation. He remained politically active, prominent in the Socialist Party of Senegal, and during the 1993 Senegalese presidential election he was a leading supporter of Abdou Diouf's successful campaign. However, after the election, he led a general strike against government austerity measures.

Diop retired as leader of the CNTS in 2001, becoming its honorary president. He was also president of the ICFTU African Regional Organisation from 1993 until his retirement, around 2005. He served on the International Labour Organization's governing body from 1984 until 1990, and was Worker Vice-chairperson of the International Labour Conference in 1996.

Trade union offices
Preceded by Babacar Diagne	General Secretary of the National Confederation of Senegalese Workers; 1983–2001	Succeeded by Mody Guiro
Preceded by Sadok Allouche	President of the ICFTU African Regional Organisation; 1993–2005	Succeeded by Mody Guiro
