= Mathurin Anghiley =

Gabonese politician

- Minister: Senator

Personal details
- Born: 3 June 1886 Libreville
- Died: 1 June 1949 (aged 62) Libreville
- Occupation: Politician

Mathurin Anghiley (3 June 1886 in Libreville, Gabon - 1 June 1949 in Libreville) was a Gabonese politician who was elected to the French Senate in 1947. His daughter was the trade unionist Simone Saint-Dénis.
