= Confederation of Madagascar Trade Unions =

Trade union confederation in Madagascar

FISEMA
- Confederation of Madagascar Trade Unions
- Firaisan'ny Sendikan’ny Mpiasa Eto Madagasikara
- Founded: 1956 (1938)
- Location: Madagascar
- Members: 13,615
- Secretary General: Jose Randrianasolo
- Affiliations: ITUC, OATUU
- Website: fisema.mg

The Confederation of Madagascar Trade Unions (Malagasy: Firaisan'ny Sendikan'ny Mpiasa Eto Madagasikara, French: Confédération générale des syndicats de travailleurs de Madagascar), is a Malagasy trade union confederation founded in 1956.

== Origins ==
In 1936, while the Popular Front government granted trade union freedom in the French colonial territories, local officials often blocked attempts by activists to organise. Activists associated with the French CGT attempted to create a section in Madagascar, but were met with opposition and brought up on criminal charges in 1937. These charges were dropped in 1938 and a section affiliated with the CGT was formed which brought together four unions representing peasants, agriculture, printers and health workers. During the union's congress in August 1956, the section became an independent entity and took its present name. FISEMA was a founding member of the Conference of Madagascar Workers (CTM) in 1997.
