= Simone Saint-Dénis =

Gabonese trade union leader

Simone Saint-Denis
- Born: 1934; Libreville
- Died: 2008 (aged 73–74); Libreville
- Occupations: Trade unionist; Teacher

Simone Saint-Dénis (1934 – 2008) was a trade union leader from Gabon, who played an active role in politics in the post-independence era.

== Biography ==
Saint-Dénis was born in Libreville in 1934, to parents from the Mpongwe ethnic group. Her father was Mathurin Anghiley, a politician; her mother's identity is unrecorded. Her father adopted the surname Saint-Dénis after he discovered that his birth father was a Danish sailor, rather than his mother's husband. Her father had served in the French military and the family had wine and bread at most meals.

In 1948 Saint-Dénis completed her secondary education at a Catholic mission school and immediately became engaged to Balé - a timber camp worker. At the new, her father forced her out of the house, the engagement was short and broken off by Balé; Saint-Dénis then moved in with her mother. There were few jobs for educated women in post-war Libreville, so Saint-Dénis decided to train as a teacher. In 1950 she began to teach at the school of the Catholic mission to Donguila, a village in the remote Estuaire Province, where most of the children spoke Fang.

== Trade unionism ==
The poor pay of teachers first drew Saint-Dénis to become involved with unionism through the Confédération Française des Travailleurs Chrétiens (CFTC). Through Saint-Dénis' activism, the CFTC negotiated pay increases for teachers at Catholic schools in the 1950s. Her work with the CFTC continued after Gabon's independence and from 1960-67 she represented Gabonese unions at a variety of international meetings, travelling to Copenhagen, Rome, and Bucharest. However after an attempted military coup in 1964, the Gabonese government under Léon M’ba tried to increase control over unions. His successor Oumar Bongo Ondimba consolidated control, leaving little room for trade unions and their representatives like Saint-Dénis.

In the 1970s, the Parti Démocratique Gabonais (PDG) coerced Saint-Dénis into accepting a job for them organising musical events, where women's groups representing the diversity of Gabon sang and danced to show support for the PDG. Despite this she remained involved with unionism and in 1976 was elected Joint Secretary of the Fédération Syndicale Gabonaise (FESYGA) with Owondault Berre; in 1980 she was elected Secretary.

== Personal life ==
Saint-Dénis had two children with a Gabonese diplomat. She retired from the PDG in 1981 and died in Libreville in 2008 from complications due to diabetes. In her later life she spoke to many Western researchers, whose recordings of her life provide an insightful perspective on twentieth-century Gabon.
