= General Confederation of Free Workers of Cameroon =

CGTLC
- General Confederation of Free Workers of Cameroon
- Founded: March 2003
- Location: Cameroon
- Key people: Benoît Essiga
- Affiliations: none

The General Confederation of Free Workers of Cameroon (CGTLC) is a trade union centre in Cameroon.

It was formed in March, 2003 by Benoît Essiga, a former president of the Confederation of Cameroon Trade Unions.
