= Liberian Federation of Trade Unions =

Former Liberian trade union

The Liberian Federation of Trade Unions (abbreviated LFTU) was a trade union centre in Liberia.

In 1977 the Liberian president William R. Tolbert Jr. had urged the different trade union centres to unite into a single body. Thus the Liberian Federation of Trade Unions (LFTU) was founded, uniting the Labor Congress of Liberia and the Congress of Industrial Organizations of Liberia. Nevertheless the United Workers Congress of Liberia and the United Mine Workers Union refused to join LFTU.

The LFTU president was A. Benedict Tolbert, son of president Tolbert. Amos Gray served as the secretary general of LFTU.

LFTU was a member of the International Confederation of Free Trade Unions. LFTU was given ICFTU membership at the 70th Executive Board meeting of ICFTU, held in Hamburg in May 1978. ICFTU was represented at the inauguration ceremony of LFTU on October 12, 1977. ICFTU sponsored a number of organizational trainings for LFTU.

As of January 1979 ICFTU estimated the LFTU membership at 10,000.

In August 1979 LFTU and UWC signed an agreement to work towards a merger and draft a joint constitution. The two centres were due to merge before the end of 1979, but merger talks were delayed after the death of mother and niece of the LFTU secretary-general Gray. In 1980 LFTU and UWC merged, forming the Liberian Federation of Labor Unions (LFLU). The ICFTU membership of LFTU was passed on to LFLU.
