= Mody Guiro =

Mody Guiro (born 17 November 1951) is a Mali-born Senegalese trade union leader.

Born in Kayes in Mali, Guiro trained as an electrician and moved to study in Thiès in Senegal. He became interested in communism, and joined the Thiès Union of Trade Unions, rising to become regional secretary. In 2001, the general secretary of the National Confederation of Senegalese Workers, Madia Diop, retired. Guiro contested the post, defeating Diop's preferred successor, Cheikh Diop. As a member of the Socialist Party of Senegal, he became a leading opponent of the Senegalese Democratic Party government, leading a wave of strikes. In December 2002, he signed a compact with the government, providing for regular consultation with unions.

In 2005, Guiro was additionally elected as president of the ICFTU African Regional Organisation. In 2007, this became part of the new ITUC-Africa, with Guiro continuing as president.

Trade union offices
Preceded by Madia Diop	General Secretary of the National Confederation of Senegalese Workers; 2001–present	Succeeded by Incumbent
Preceded by Madia Diop	President of the ICFTU African Regional Organisation; 2005–2007	Succeeded by Federation merged
Preceded by Federation founded	President of ITUC-Africa; 2007–present	Succeeded by Incumbent
