= Trade unions in Niger =

- National organization(s): USTN

Global Rights Index
- 3 Regular violations of rights

International Labour Organization
- Niger is a member of the ILO

Convention ratification
- Freedom of Association: 27 February 1961
- Right to Organise: 23 March 1962

Trade unions in Niger are free to engage in regular unionist activities, with constitutionally protected provisions for forming and joining trade unions. However, with 95% the working population engaged in subsistence activities, the numbers of trade union members are low.

== Trade unions ==
The Union of Workers' Trade Unions of Niger (USTN) is the largest trade union centre with a membership of 60,000. The Democratic Confederation of Workers of Niger (CDTN) was formed in 2001 as a breakaway union from the USTN. The Nigerien Confederation of Labour (CNT) is the third largest trade union centre.

== Strike actions ==
=== 2009 Constitutional crisis ===
On 25 June 2009, the CDTN trade union confederation led a 24-hour general strike across the nation to protest the President's referendum plans, after a previous strike had been indefinitely postponed on 18 June. All seven trade union confederations took part, in the first general strike since the creation of the Fifth Republic in 1999, and the first joint action by all seven major confederations. The organizers provided skeleton staffs of union workers for hospitals, water and electric utilities, and airports.
