= Confédération africaine des syndicats libres =

Confédération africaine des syndicats libres (CASL, 'African Confederation of Free Trade Unions'), initially 'Confédération africaine des syndicats libres-Force ouvrière (CASL-FO, 'African Confederation of Free Trade Unions-Workers Power'), was an Africa confederation of trade unions. CASL-FO was founded in February 1958 as the African sections of the French trade union centre CGT-Force Ouvrière separated themselves from their mother organization. The new union confederation was founded at a conference in Abidjan February 8–9, 1958, with participation of the CGT-FO branches of Senegal, French Soudan, Upper Volta, Niger, Ivory Coast, Cameroon, Moyen-Congo and Ubangui-Shari. At the time of the founding of CASL-FO, the relationship of the new structure with the International Confederation of Free Trade Unions (ICFTU) and CGT-FO, was debated. In the end the conference resolved that CASL-FO and CGT-FO should have membership of ICFTU on equal footing.

The launching of CASL-FO followed the creation of two other pan-African trade union bodies in French Africa, UGTAN and CATC. CGT-FO had opposed the formation of independent African unions, reluctantly accepting this development by 1958. However, it was stated that although CASL-FO would not be organizationally dependent on CGT-FO it would retain links to the French body. A coordination committee with three representatives of CGT-FO and three representatives of CASL-FO was to oversee the liaisons between the two bodies.

A provisional bureau for CASL-FO was formed, with one representative of French Equatorial Africa, one from French West Africa (Diadié Coulibaly from French Soudan) and one from Cameroon. Antoine Ambili, of French Equatorial Africa, was the general secretary of CASL-FO. Ambili also served as joint secretary of the African Socialist Movement.

CASL-FO was founded on three principles; defense of African personality, the ideals of the free trade union movement and the principles of the French trade union movement (Charter of Amiens). It claimed to be strictly independent of any philosophy or religion.

In 1958 CASL-FO openly called for a 'Yes' vote in the referendum on the French Community.

Shortly afterwards, at the first congress of CASL-FO in September 1959, 'FO' was removed from the name of the organization as it aspired to become the regional organization of ICFTU in sub-Saharan Africa. ICFTU did, however, not approve this request. CGT-FO also rejected these ambitions.

In Senegal CASL-FO was led by Alassane Sow and Sijh Sar. In Cameroon, CASL-FO provided nominal support to the dominant Union Camerounaise. In Upper Volta the CASL section formed the Union nationale des travailleurs de la Haute-Volta, which in 1964 evolved into the Organisation voltaïque des syndicats libres. The Ivorian section of CASL became the Union national de la CASL in 1959.
