= Union of Mauritanian Workers =

UTM
- Union of Mauritanian Workers
- Union des Travailleurs de Mauritanie
- Founded: 1961
- Headquarters: Nouakchott, Mauritania
- Location: Mauritania
- Key people: Mohamed Ely Ould Brahim, secretary general
- Affiliations: ITUC

The Union of Mauritanian Workers (UTM) is a national trade union center in Mauritania. It was formed in 1961, and was the sole trade union center until the 1990s when political reforms led to the creation of two other centers, the CLTM and the CGTM.

The UTM is traditionally seen as closely linked to the ruling Democratic and Social Republican Party (PRDS). It is affiliated with the International Trade Union Confederation.
