= Confederation of Trade Unions of Burundi =

National trade union federation in Burundi

COSYBU
- Confederation of Trade Unions of Burundi
- Confédération des Syndicats du Burundi
- Founded: 1995
- Headquarters: Bujumbura
- Location: Burundi
- Members: 53,611 (2014)
- Affiliations: International Trade Union Confederation

The Confederation of Trade Unions of Burundi (French: Confédération des Syndicats du Burundi, COSYBU) is the larger of the two national trades union federations active in Burundi. It is distinct from the Trade Union Confederation of Burundi (Confédération syndicale du Burundi, CSB). Both trade unions COSYBU and CSB are affiliated to the International Trade Union Confederation (ITUC).

COSYBU was formed in 1995 when it split from the recently established CSB. Although separate, the two organisations maintain good relations and frequently collaborate. The COSYBU reformed its structure in 2013 and its confederal governing body includes representatives from its affiliated unions as well as membership from the national provinces.

In total, 31 of the 59 officially recognised trade unions in Burundi are affiliated to the COSYBU. The two largest, representing teachers (STEB) and transport workers (SYPROTAVEBU), together constitute about 75 percent of the confederation's total membership. In total, COSYBU had 53,611 affiliated members in 2014. However, only a minority pay fees to affiliate to the union.

According to ITUC reports, labor rights are frequently violated in Burundi and the right to strike is limited. Most Burundians work in the informal economy and members of certain unions have been harassed for their affiliations. It is estimated that only 1.3 percent of the labour force are members of trade unions. Several collective bargaining agreements for workers in particular sectors covered by the COSYBU.

== See also ==
- Federation of Workers of Burundi (FTB), active 1963–1965
- Economy of Burundi
- Politics of Burundi
