= Confédération des Syndicats Libres Autonomes du Congo =

COSYLAC
- Confédération des Syndicats Libres Autonomes du Congo
- Headquarters: Brazzaville, Republic of the Congo
- Location: Republic of the Congo
- Affiliations: ITUC

The Confédération des Syndicats Libres Autonomes du Congo (COSYLAC) is a trade union centre in Republic of the Congo.

The COSYLAC is affiliated with the International Trade Union Confederation.
