= Democratic Confederation of Workers of Niger =

Trade union in Niger

CDTN
- Democratic Confederation of Workers of Niger
- Confédération Démocratique des Travailleurs du Niger
- Founded: 2001
- Location: Niger
- Members: 40,000 (est)
- Key people: Sidibé Issoufou

The Democratic Confederation of Workers of Niger (CDTN) is a trade union in Niger, formed as a breakaway from the Union of Workers' Trade Unions of Niger.

== See also ==
- Trade unions in Niger
- Union of Workers' Trade Unions of Niger
