= Christian Confederation of Malagasy Trade Unions =

SEKRIMA
- Christian Confederation of Malagasy Trade Unions
- Sendika Kristianina Malagasy
- Founded: 1938
- Headquarters: Antananarivo, Madagascar
- Location: Madagascar
- Members: 7000
- Key people: Jean Chrysostôme Razafimandimby, confederal secretary
- Affiliations: ITUC

The Christian Confederation of Malagasy Trade Unions (in Malagasy Sendika krisitianina malagasy) (SEKRIMA) is a national trade union center in Madagascar. SEKRIMA is affiliated with the International Trade Union Confederation. It is democratic and does not depend on any religious denomination or any political party.

== History ==
In 1938, the indigenous section of the French Confederation of Christian Workers (CFTC) or Confédération Française des Travailleurs Chrétiens, was created in Madagascar on the initiative of Monsignor Victor Sartre, then a Jesuit professor at the Ambatoroka Major Theological Seminary, later the Archbishop of Tananarive.

In 1956, the Malagasy section of the CFTC became the Christian Confederation of Malagasy Trade Unions (CCSM), which directly joined the International Confederation of Christian Trade Unions (CISC). In 1964, it took its Malagasy name, still in force, SEKRIMA or Sendika kristianina malagasy.

In the 1950s SEKRIMA had a membership of 100,000, but after the State effectively banned the independent unions of the National Front for the Defense of the Revolution (FNDR) in 1976 and SEKRIMA suspended its activities, its membership dropped to only 7000. It has resumed trade union activities little by little with the restoration of pluralism. It is one of the members in the Conference of Workers of Madagascar (CTM).

== Composition ==
SEKRIMA comprises seven federations:

Fekritama - Christian Federation of Malagasy Peasants (Agriculture)

Fectrasi - Christian Federation of Workers in the Informal Sector, which brings together workers such as craftsmen, street merchants, dockers, etc., resulting from the merger on July 8, 1995 of two former federations: Fekrima (Federation of artisans) and Fekrieba (Federation of informal sector agents)

Fekrisam - Christian Federation of Malagasy Services (private establishments governed by the labor code)

Fekrimpama - Federasionina Kristianin'ny Mpanabe Malagasy (teachers and other staff in the public and private school system, from kindergarten to university)

Fecpama - Christian Federation of Malagasy Artisanal Fisheries

Fekmama - Christian Federation of Malagasy Sailors, which brings together sailors and seafarers, founded in June 1993

Fekrimi - Federation of Workers of Industrial Enterprises, founded in 1987, in the (a) Wood and building, (b) Textile and clothing, (c) Agri-food, (d) Mining, (e) Energy, (f) Mechanical engineering and metallurgy, and (g) Chemical industries
