= Organisation of Trade Unions of West Africa =

Regional organisation of West African trade unions

OTUWA
- Organisation of Trade Unions of West Africa
- Founded: 1983
- Headquarters: Abuja (2015–); Abidjan (1986–2015); Conakry (1983–1986)
- Key people: John Ejoha Odah, Executive Secretary

The Organisation of Trade Unions of West Africa (OTUWA; French: Organisation des syndicats d'Afrique de l'Ouest, Portuguese: Organização dos Sindicatos da África Ocidental) is a coalition of national trade union centres in West Africa. OTUWA was founded in 1983 in Conakry, Guinea, and is currently led by executive secretary John Ejoha Odah.

== History ==
In 1986, OTUWA was accorded consultative status by the Economic Community of West African States (ECOWAS) as the representative organisation of trade unions in West Africa. OTUWA supports the integration of process of ECOWAS, while calling for reductions in unemployment, integration of young workers into labour markets and the protection of migrant workers.

In 2015, as part of a revival process, the headquarters of OTUWA was moved from Abidjan to Abuja in order to be closer to the ECOWAS secretariat. In 2017, OTUWA was critical of the ECOWAS states for the lack of growth in the region and called for measures to facilitate development. As of 2020, OTUWA has affiliates in all 15 ECOWAS states.
