= Free Confederation of Mauritanian Workers =

CLTM
- Free Confederation of Mauritanian Workers
- Confédération Libre des Travailleurs de Mauritanie
- Founded: 1995
- Headquarters: Nouakchott, Mauritania
- Location: Mauritania
- Key people: Samory Ould Beye, secretary general
- Affiliations: ITUC

The Free Confederation of Mauritanian Workers (Confédération Libre des Travailleurs de Mauritanie, CLTM) is a national trade union centre in Mauritania, headquartered in Nouakchott. It is affiliated with the International Trade Union Confederation (ITUC) and its African regional body, the African Regional Organisation. The CLTM's secretary general, Samory Ould Beye, is a prominent figure in the Haratin social emancipation movement and has been active in campaigning against slavery in Mauritania.

== Anti-slavery activism ==
The CLTM has been involved in campaigns against forced labour and the persistence of slavery in Mauritania, which continues to affect the Haratin community despite being legally abolished. In January 2016, local authorities in Dar Naim prohibited a CLTM rally organised with the support of the Spanish agency for international development cooperation (AECID) that was intended to launch an awareness-raising campaign on slavery, claiming the event was "political" in nature.

In 2018, the CLTM signed a protocol of agreement with the Mauritanian Ministry of Public Service and Labour and other trade union centres, committing to implement an action plan to eradicate forced labour and child labour following the recommendations of the International Labour Organization (ILO) Commission of Experts. Secretary general Samory Ould Beye has spoken at the ILO's annual Conference Committee on the Application of Standards regarding the continuation of slavery practices in Mauritania. On May Day 2018, Beye warned of human trafficking of Mauritanian women as domestic workers to Saudi Arabia, describing the issue as one of the CLTM's priorities.

== Trade union rights ==
The CLTM has faced significant government interference and repression. Following the military coup of August 6, 2008, which overthrew the democratically elected president Sidi Ould Cheikh Abdallahi, the CLTM joined five other national trade union centres in protesting for the restoration of constitutional order. On August 19, 2008, although a demonstration had been authorised, Samory Ould Beye and other trade unionists were forcibly taken to a police station in Nouakchott before being released. In October 2008, the six trade union centres attempted to organise a demonstration in Nouadhibou to mark the International Day for the Eradication of Poverty but were prevented by the junta's ban on all demonstrations. In December 2008, the CLTM participated in the formation of a coalition of democratic forces alongside political parties and civil society organisations, aimed at restoring democratic freedoms.

In December 2018, Beye was detained by the director of national security after publishing a Facebook post that authorities claimed incited hatred. The CLTM denounced the detention as a manipulation intended to distract from an incident the previous day, during which a participant at a meeting with the Minister of Public Service had brandished a pistol at Beye.

== See also ==
- Trade unions in Mauritania
- Slavery in Mauritania
- Haratin
