= Mauritius Labour Congress =

MLC
- Mauritius Labour Congress
- Founded: 1963
- Headquarters: Port Louis, Mauritius
- Location: Mauritius
- Members: 30,000
- Key people: Bholanath JEEWUTH, general secretary President: M.Haniff PEERUN
- Affiliations: ITUC, OATUU

The Mauritius Labour Congress is a national trade union center in Mauritius. It was created in 1963 from a merger of the Mauritius Trade Union Congress and the Mauritius Confederation of Free Trade Unions.

The MLC is affiliated with the International Trade Union Confederation.
