= Labor Union of Liberia =

The Labor Union of Liberia (abbreviated LUL) was the first trade union in Liberia. LUL was founded in 1949. A legislation paving the way for the foundation of LUL was passed by the legislature of Liberia on December 22, 1949. LUL was not limited to any specific profession, and organized clerks, merchants, truck drivers, laundry workers, store workers and typists. LUL was dependent on the Liberian government.

After a short period of existence LUL went defunct.
