= General Union of the Workers of São Tomé and Príncipe =

Trade union in São Tomé and Príncipe

UGT/STP
- General Union of the Workers of São Tomé and Príncipe
- União Geral dos Trabalhadores de São Tomé and Príncipe
- Headquarters: São Tomé, São Tomé and Príncipe
- Location: São Tomé and Príncipe
- Key people: Manuel da Costa Carlos, secretary general
- Affiliations: ITUC

The General Union of the Workers of São Tomé and Príncipe (UGT/STP) is a national trade union center in São Tomé and Príncipe.

The UGT/STP is affiliated with the International Trade Union Confederation.
