= Nigerien Confederation of Labour =

Trade union in Niger

CNT
- Nigerien Confederation of Labour
- Confédération Nigérienne du Travail
- Founded: 1996
- Headquarters: Niamey, Niger
- Location: Niger
- Members: 15,000
- Key people: Seybou Issou, secretary general
- Affiliations: ITUC

The Nigerien Confederation of Labour (CNT) is a trade union federation in Niger. Founded in 1996, the CNT unites 5 unions, and is affiliated with the International Trade Union Confederation.

== See also ==
- Trade unions in Niger
