= Margaret Simwanza Sitta =

Tanzanian politician

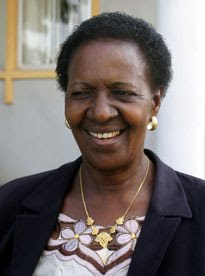

Urambo MP
- Incumbent
- Assumed office 12 November 2015
- Appointed by: Jakaya Kikwete and John Magufuli
- Constituency: Urambo

Personal details
- Born: 24 July 1946 (age 80) Njombe, Iringa, Tanganyika
- Party: CCM
- Spouse: Samuel Sitta
- Education: Mzumbe University (AdvDip)

Military service
- Allegiance: United Rep. of Tanzania
- Branch/service: National Service
- Military camp: Mafinga and Oljoro
- Duration: 1 year

Margaret Simwanza Sitta (born 24 July 1946) is a Tanzanian Chama Cha Mapinduzi politician elected as a member of parliament for Urambo, serving from 2015 to 2020. She previously served as Minister of Education and Vocational Training as well as Minister of Community Development, Gender and Children. Prior to joining politics, she worked as a teacher in government schools.

== Early life and education ==
Margaret Simwanza Sitta was born on 24 July 1946. She was educated at Tabora Town Primary School from 1954 to 1957, then attended Ussoke Girls Middle School from 1958 to 1961. She completed her schooling at the Tabora Girls Secondary School in 1965 and received her Certificate of Grade "A" from the Mpwapwa Teachers College in 1967; she later received her diploma at the same college in 1985. She finally received a Ba ED Hons-Degree at the University of Dar es Salaam in 1988.

== Career ==
After teaching school, she worked as a secondary school teacher at Tabora Girls, Azania, Mwanza and Forodhani throughout the years 1968 to 1980. In 1980, she held District Education Officer positions of Urambo, Moshi and Kinondoni Municipal from 1990 to 1995. In 1996, she became Head of Workers Education Department - DSM, hired by Trade Unions Confederation of Tanzania (TUCTA) Institution, where she worked for four years. In 2000, she served the Ministry of Education and Vocational Training as Officer-Office of the Commissioner of Education DSM. She was the president of the Tanzania Teachers’ Union before being appointed as Minister of Education and Vocational Training by President Jakaya Kikwete in 2006, a position she held until 2008. From 2008 to 2010, she continued to hold her minister position, but in the Ministry of Community Development, Gender and Children office.

== Political career ==
Margaret Simwanza Sitta first took on a political role in 2005 when she became a member of Chama Cha Mapinduzi (CCM) party. She was nominated to the parliament in 2005 representing Urambo constituency. She served CCM as a Member of Ward Political Committee-Msasani DSM from 2005 to 2010 and later as a Member of the National Executive Council in 2017. From 2012 to date, she has served her political party as a Member-NEC Urambo. She was reelected as a member of parliament in 2010 and 2015.

=== Family life ===
Margaret Simwanza Sitta married Samuel John Sitta who was the Speaker of the National Assembly of Tanzania from 2005 to 2010 and Minister of East African Cooperation from 2010 to 2015. Samuel Sitta died at around 3 am on 7 November 2016 at TUM School of Medicine (Klinikum rechts der Isar) in Munich (Germany) after falling ill for a short period.
