= Federation of Autonomous Trade Unions of Ivory Coast =

FESACI
- Federation of Autonomous Trade Unions of Ivory Coast
- Fedération des Syndicats Autonomes de Côte d'Ivoire
- Founded: 1992
- Location: Ivory Coast
- Members: 30 trade unions
- Key people: Marcel Ette, secretary general

The Federation of Autonomous Trade Unions of Ivory Coast (FESACI) is a trade union federation in Ivory Coast.

It was founded in 1992, and has a membership of 30 affiliated trade unions.
