= Gabonese Confederation of Free Trade Unions =

CGSL
- Gabonese Confederation of Free Trade Unions
- Confédération Gabonaise des Syndicats Libres
- Headquarters: Libreville, Gabon
- Location: Gabon
- Affiliations: ITUC

The Gabonese Confederation of Free Trade Unions (CGSL) is a trade union centre in Gabon. It is affiliated with the International Trade Union Confederation.
