= United Autonomous Unions of Madagascar =

USAM
- United Autonomous Unions of Madagascar
- Union des Syndicats Autonomes de Madagascar
- Headquarters: Antananarivo, Madagascar
- Location: Madagascar
- Key people: Norbert Rakotomanana, president
- Affiliations: ITUC

The United Autonomous Unions of Madagascar (USAM) is a national trade union center in Madagascar. It is affiliated with the International Trade Union Confederation.
