= Trade Union Confederation of Burundi =

CSB
- Trade Union Confederation of Burundi
- Confédération syndicale du Burundi
- Founded: 1991
- Headquarters: Bujumbura
- Location: Burundi
- Members: 5,500 (2014)
- Affiliations: International Trade Union Confederation

Trade Union Confederation of Burundi (French: Confédération syndicale du Burundi, CSB) is the smaller of the two national trades union federations active in Burundi. It is distinct from Confederation of Trade Unions of Burundi (Confédération des Syndicats du Burundi, COSYBU). Both the COSYBU and CSB are affiliated to the International Trade Union Confederation (ITUC).

The CSB was founded in 1991. COSYBU was founded in 1995 after seceding from the CSB, but the two organisations cooperate. In total, 10 of the 59 officially recognised trade unions in Burundi are affiliated to the CSB. In total, the CSB had 5,500 affiliated members in 2014.

According to ITUC reports, labor rights are frequently violated in Burundi and the right to strike is limited. Most Burundians work in the informal economy and members of certain unions have been harassed for their affiliations. It was estimated that only 1.3 percent of the labour force were trade union members in 2014.

== See also ==
- Federation of Workers of Burundi (FTB), active between 1963–65
- Economy of Burundi
- Politics of Burundi
