= Union of Free Trade Unions of Cameroon =

USLC
- Union of Free Trade Unions of Cameroon
- Union des Syndicats Libres du Cameroun
- Founded: 1995
- Headquarters: Yaoundé, Cameroon
- Location: Cameroon
- Members: 50,000 (2006)
- Key people: Flaubert Moussole, president M'Bom Mefe, secretary general
- Affiliations: ITUC, OATUU

The Union of Free Trade Unions of Cameroon (Union des syndicats libres du Cameroun or USLC) is a trade union centre in Cameroon. The USLC is affiliated with the International Trade Union Confederation, and the Organization of African Trade Union Unity.

== History ==
Trade unions are permitted in Cameroon under the 1992 labor code. The Union of Free Trade Unions of Cameroon was created in 1996 by the government. The creation of the USLC was seen as a strategy by the government to weaken the influence of the Confederation of Cameroonian Trade Unions, the only labor union at the time.

In 2006, the USLC was estimated to have 50,000 members, and was then presided by Flaubert Moussolê.
