= Workers' Trade Union Confederation of Mali =

- Confédération Syndicale des Travailleurs du Mali
- Abbreviation: CSTM
- Headquarters: Bamako, Mali
- Location: Mali
- Members: 15,000 (2003 est.)
- Key people: Hammadoun Amion Guindo, secretary general
- Affiliations: ITUC

The Workers' Trade Union Confederation of Mali (French: Confédération Syndicale des Travailleurs du Mali, CSTM) is a national trade union center in Mali. It is composed of four trade unions which broke from the National Workers' Union of Mali (UNTM) in 1997.

The CSTM is affiliated with the International Trade Union Confederation.
