= General Workers Union in Ivory Coast =

National trade union federation in Ivory Coast

UGTCI
- General Workers Union in Ivory Coast
- Union Générale des Travailleurs de Côte d'Ivoire
- Founded: 1962
- Headquarters: Abidjan, Ivory Coast
- Location: Ivory Coast
- Members: 231 trade unions
- Key people: Adiko Niamkey, secretary general
- Affiliations: ITUC, OATUU

General Workers Union in Ivory Coast (in French: Union Générale des Travailleurs de Côte d'Ivoire), a national trade union federation in Ivory Coast. UGTCI was created in 1962 by PDCI, and was to become the sole legal trade union centre of the country for many years.
