= National Organization of the Workers of São Tomé and Príncipe – Central Union =

Trade union in São Tomé and Príncipe

ONTSTP-CS
- National Organization of the Workers of São Tomé and Príncipe - Central Union
- Organizaçâo Nacional dos Trabalhadores de São Tomé and Príncipe - Central Sindical
- Headquarters: São Tomé, São Tomé and Príncipe
- Location: São Tomé and Príncipe
- Key people: João Sousa Pontes Tavares, secretary general
- Affiliations: ITUC

The National Organization of the Workers of São Tomé and Príncipe – Central Union (ONTSTP-CS) is a national trade union center in São Tomé and Príncipe.

The ONTSTP-CS is affiliated with the International Trade Union Confederation.
