= Issoufou Sidibé =

Nigerien labour leader

Issoufou Sidibé is a Nigerien labour leader and politician who is the Secretary-General of the Democratic Confederation of the Workers of Niger (CDTN).

== Political involvement ==
Speaking on Radio Kakaki in late September 2004, CDTN Secretary-General Sidibé urged Nigerien workers to vote against President Mamadou Tandja in the November 2004 presidential election, accusing Tandja of treating workers' demands with contempt. He was a leader in the coalition against the high cost of living; in late March 2005, after the coalition called for a general strike on 5 April 2005, Sidibé was wanted by the police.

On 5 March 2007, Sidibé criticized the composition of a new government that he said retained figures who were involved in political and financial scandals. He said that Nigeriens wanted a government composed of "new and technically competent men and women", and he also criticized the expansion of the government from 26 to 31 members, saying that this burdened the taxpayer with the needless expense of additional ministerial salaries.

=== Events since 2009 ===
Amidst Tandja's efforts to call a referendum on a new constitution that would enable him to run for re-election indefinitely, Sidibé became a leading member of the Front for the Defence of Democracy (FDD), a large coalition opposing Tandja's move, when it was formed in May 2009. He alleged that Tandja had "left the door wide open for a slide into authoritarian rule" and called for "a united front ... to stop the referendum". After Tandja dissolved the National Assembly on 26 May 2009, Sidibé said that Tandja had done so because he feared the government would lose its parliamentary majority. He said that the FDD would campaign across Niger "to help raise awareness about the grave threats [Tandja] poses to our democratic achievements"; according to Sidibé, a tour was necessary because Tandja controlled or dominated the media and "there is no freedom of expression in the country". He also expressed surprise at Tandja's move to remove term limits, noting that Tandja had previously been critical when such moves were taken by other African leaders.

Later, after Tandja dissolved the Constitutional Court, the opposition called for the people to stay home and effectively shut down the country as a form of protest; however, the call seemed to be largely ignored, as business reportedly continued as usual in Niamey on 1 July 2009. Apparently unconcerned by the failure of the protest, Sidibé argued that it had fizzled because the call had been "spontaneous" and there had only been two days notice for the protest. He also warned that if Tandja abandoned the legal framework in his efforts to hold the referendum, then the opposition might also abandon the legal framework in its efforts to stop him. Later in the month, Sidibé told The New York Times that Tandja had "made us miss our entrance into the great court of democratic nations, like Ghana and Mali.... It's made every Nigerien who is proud of his country very angry."

Speaking on the radio on 22 July 2009, Sidibé announced a call by labor unions for "all public sector, parastatal, private and even the informal sector workers to embark on a mass strike" for 48 hours, beginning on 23 July; this was intended as a way of protesting the referendum plans and pressuring Tandja. After the strike was declared illegal by the government, Sidibé said that despite the ban, "thousands of workers in all sectors are following the strike, especially in the countryside", although daily life was reportedly continuing as normal in Niamey. The government banned the strike because it deemed the strike's goals to be "purely political" and unrelated to labor issues.

Sidibé and the opposition called for the people to boycott the referendum, which was scheduled for 4 August 2009, instead of participating and voting "no". The referendum was held as planned, and in the absence of opposition participation it passed by an overwhelming margin. Following the arrest of opposition leader Marou Amadou on 10 August 2009, Sidibé said that the arrest was intended to intimidate the rest of the opposition. Sidibé announced on 16 August that the Coordination of Democratic Forces for the Republic (CFDR) opposition coalition would conduct nationwide protests against the referendum's "fantasy results" on 20 August.

The opposition also boycotted the October 2009 parliamentary election, which was held under the new constitution. Sidibé dismissed the government's estimate of 51% voter turnout, claiming that the real voter turnout rate was anemic—less than 5%.
