= Free Confederation of Chadian Workers =

CLTT
- Free Confederation of Chadian Workers
- Confédération Libre des Travailleurs du Tchad
- Founded: 1991
- Headquarters: N'Djaména, Chad
- Location: Chad
- Key people: Brahim Bakass, president
- Affiliations: ITUC

The Free Confederation of Chadian Workers (CLTT) is a trade union centre in Chad. It was formed in 1991 by members from the dissolved National Confederation of Trade Unions of Chad.

The CLTT is affiliated with the International Trade Union Confederation.
