= National Workers' Union of Mali =

UNTM
- National Workers' Union of Mali
- Union Nationale des Travailleurs du Mali
- Founded: 1963
- Headquarters: Bourse du Travail; BP 169; Bamako
- Location: Mali
- Members: 122,000 (2003 est.)
- Key people: Siaka Diakité, secretary general
- Affiliations: ITUC, OATUU

The National Workers' Union of Mali (UNTM, Union Nationale des Travailleurs du Mali) is a national trade union center in Mali. The union is affiliated with the International Trade Union Confederation and the Organisation of African Trade Union Unity.

== History ==
UNTM was formed in 1963. It was initially closely supervised by the Keïta and Traoré regimes. In 1986, UNTM was the only recognised trade union in the country. It was affiliated to the governing party, but claimed to retain a degree of autonomy.

However, in the 1990s the relationship between the union and government deteriorated. In 1991, UNTM participated in large-scale protests against the Traoré regime. Amadou Toumani Touré consulted with Bakary Karambe, then-president of the UNTM, before arresting Traoré in March of that year. UNTM then formed part of the committee responsible for the transition to democracy.

UNTM supported the Union of Cotton Producers of Kita in its infancy. In 1997, police occupied the union's headquarters and sealed the general secretary's office.

In November 2020, UNTM threatened a general strike over a large amount of demands including the reopening of railroads, post services, reducing the cost of living and pay. The strike was conducted as threatened from December 14–18, especially impacting Mali's gold mines. However, some mining corporations such as Barrick Gold and B2Gold said they were able to continue production.
