= General Confederation of Mauritanian Workers =

National trade union in Mauritania

CGTM
- General Confederation of Mauritanian Workers
- Confédération Générale des Travailleurs de Mauritanie
- Founded: 1993
- Headquarters: Nouakchott, Mauritania
- Location: Mauritania
- Members: 25,000
- Key people: Abdallahi Ould Mohamed, secretary general
- Affiliations: ITUC
- Website: www.cgtm.org

The General Confederation of Mauritanian Workers (CGTM) is a national trade union center in Mauritania that was founded in 1993. It has a membership of 25,000 and is affiliated with the International Trade Union Confederation.
