= Confederation of Cameroon Trade Unions =

Trade union centre in Cameroon

CSTC/CCTU
- Confederation of Cameroon Trade Unions
- Confédération Syndicale des Travailleurs du Cameroun
- Headquarters: Yaoundé, Cameroon
- Location: Cameroon
- Key people: Andre Jule Mousseni, president
- Affiliations: ITUC, OATUU

The Confederation of Cameroon Trade Unions (CCTU/CSTC) is a trade union centre in Cameroon.

It is affiliated with the International Trade Union Confederation, and the Organization of African Trade Union Unity.
