= Malawi Congress of Trade Unions =

MCTU
- Malawi Congress of Trade Unions
- Founded: 1964
- Headquarters: Lilongwe, Malawi
- Location: Malawi
- Members: 45,000
- Key people: Robert Mkwezalamba, general secretary
- Affiliations: AFRO

The Malawi Congress of Trade Unions (MCTU) is a national trade union center in Malawi. It has a membership of 45,000 and is affiliated with the ICFTU African Regional Organisation.
