= Union of Workers' Trade Unions of Niger =

National trade union center in Niger

USTN
- Union of Workers' Trade Unions of Niger
- Union des Syndicats des Travailleurs du Niger
- Founded: 1960
- Headquarters: Niamey, Niger
- Location: Niger
- Members: 60,000
- Key people: Abdou Maigandi, secretary general
- Affiliations: ITUC, OATUU

The Union of Workers' Trade Unions of Niger (USTN) is a national trade union center in Niger. Formed in 1960 as the Union Nationale des Travailleurs du Niger (UNTN), the union was renamed in 1978 as the USTN.

The 1988 establishment of the National Movement of the Development Society (MNSD) in Niger saw close ties between the USTN and the MNSD. However, the USTN's support for the pro-democracy movement lead to tension, including police raids, and the 1990 detention of then secretary general Laouali Moutari.

The USTN is affiliated with the International Trade Union Confederation, and the Organization of African Trade Union Unity.

== Notable members ==
- Fatou Djibo - Treasurer, 1971.

== See also ==
- Trade unions in Niger
