= National Union of Independent Trade Unions of Togo =

UNSIT
- National Union of Independent Trade Unions of Togo
- Union Nationale des Syndicats Indépendants du Togo
- Headquarters: Lomé, Togo
- Location: Togo
- Key people: Tétévi Gbikpi-Benissan, secretary general
- Affiliations: ITUC

The National Union of Independent Trade Unions of Togo (UNSIT) is a national trade union center in Togo. It is affiliated with the International Trade Union Confederation.
