= Liberian Federation of Labor Unions =

LFLU
- Liberian Federation of Labor Unions
- Founded: 1980
- Headquarters: Monrovia, Liberia
- Location: Liberia
- Members: 60,000
- Key people: Aloysius S. Kie, president G. Isaac William, secretary general
- Affiliations: ITUC

The Liberian Federation of Labor Unions (LFLU) is a national trade union center in Liberia. It was formed in 1980 by the merging of the United Workers' Congress and the Liberian Federation of Trade Unions.

The LFLU is affiliated with the International Trade Union Confederation.
