= Gabonese Trade Union Confederation =

Trade union centre in Gabon

COSYGA
- Gabonese Trade Union Confederation
- Confédération Syndicale Gabonaise
- Founded: 1969
- Headquarters: Libreville, Gabon
- Location: Gabon
- Key people: Martin Allini, secretary general
- Affiliations: ITUC

The Gabonese Trade Union Confederation (COSYGA) is a trade union centre in Gabon.

Founded in 1969 under the name Fédération Syyndicale Gabonaise, it changed its name to COSYGA in 1978. The COSYGA was closely linked with the government until 1991, when it affiliated with the International Trade Union Confederation.

== Notable people ==
- Simone Saint-Dénis (1930-2008)
