= National Organisations of Free Trade Unions =

Trade union centre in Burkina Faso

ONSL
- National Organisations of Free Trade Unions
- Organisation nationale des syndicats libres
- Founded: 1960
- Headquarters: Ouagadougou, Burkina Faso
- Location: Burkina Faso
- Members: 6000
- Key people: Abdoulaye Yra, secretary general
- Affiliations: ITUC

The National Organisations of Free Trade Unions (ONSL) is a trade union centre in Burkina Faso. It was founded in 1960, evolving out of the Confédération africaine des syndicats libres (CASL). It was initially named Union nationale des travailleurs de la Haute-Volta (UNTHV), adopting the name Organisation voltaïque des syndicats libres in 1964.

The ONSL is affiliated with the International Trade Union Confederation.
