= National Confederation of Togolese Workers =

CNTTS
- National Confederation of Togolese Workers
- Confédération Nationale des Travailleurs du Togo
- Founded: January 1973
- Headquarters: Lomé, Togo
- Location: Togo
- Members: 35,000
- Affiliations: ITUC

The National Confederation of Togolese Workers (CNTT) is a national trade union center in Togo. It was created in January, 1973 and included the Union Nationale des Travailleurs du Togo (UNTT) and the Confédération Syndicale des Travailleurs du Togo (CSTT), both of whom had been dissolved by the government in 1972.

The CNTT is still seen as being the trade union center most closely affiliated with the Government of Togo.

The CNTT is affiliated with the International Trade Union Confederation.
