= Zanzibar Trade Union Congress =

National trade union in Tanzania

- Solidarity Forever
- Abbreviation: ZATUC
- Founded: 2002
- Type: Trade union center
- Headquarters: Mapinduzi Road, Kikwajuni; Zanzibar, Tanzania
- Location: Zanzibar
- Members: 14,000
- Key people: Makame Launi Makame, secretary general
- Affiliations: ITUC
- Website: zatuc.org

The Zanzibar Trade Union Congress (ZATUC) is a national trade union center in Tanzania. It was formed in 2002 from a merger of 9 unions in the Zanzibar region.

The ZATUC is affiliated with the International Trade Union Confederation.
