= Mauritius Trade Union Congress =

Trade union centre in Mauritius

MTUC
- Mauritius Trade Union Congress
- Founded: 1946
- Headquarters: Port Louis, Mauritius
- Location: Mauritius
- Members: 29,000
- Key people: Dewan Quedou, President
- Affiliations: ITUC
- Website: www.mtucmauritius.org

The Mauritius Trade Union Congress (MTUC) is a national trade union center in Mauritius. It was founded by Emmanuel Anquetil in 1946. MTUC is affiliated with the International Trade Union Confederation.
