= Fédération des Travailleurs du Burundi =

The Federation of Workers of Burundi (French: Fédération des travailleurs de Burundi, or FTB) was a national trade union federation in Burundi active in the years immediately after independence. It was founded in 1963 and was affiliated to the All-African Trade Union Federation. Its general secretary was Augustin Ntamagara. The FTB claimed to have 3,000 members in 1963, and was connected to the ruling Union for National Progress (UPRONA) party. It was banned by the Minister of Justice in 1965.
