= National Confederation of Senegalese Workers =

CNTS
- National Confederation of Senegalese Workers
- Confédération Nationale des Travailleurs Sénégalais
- Founded: 1969
- Headquarters: Dakar, Senegal
- Location: Senegal
- Members: 60,000
- Key people: Mody Guiro, secretary general
- Affiliations: ITUC; ILPS
- Website: www.cnts.sn

The National Confederation of Senegalese Workers (CNTS) is a national trade union center in Senegal, It was founded in 1969 and has a membership of 60,000.

The CNTS is affiliated with the International Trade Union Confederation.

== General Secretaries ==
1969: Sogui Konaté
1977: Babacar Diagne
1982: Madia Diop
2001: Mody Guiro
