= Trade Union Centre of Workers of Rwanda =

National trade union centre in Rwanda

CESTRAR
- Trade Union Centre of Workers of Rwanda
- Centrale Syndicale des Travailleurs du Rwanda
- Founded: 1985
- Headquarters: Kigali, Rwanda
- Location: Rwanda
- Key people: Eric Manzi, general secretary
- Affiliations: ITUC
- Website: www.cestrar.org

The Trade Union Centre of Workers of Rwanda is a national trade union center in Rwanda. It was founded in 1985 as the sole national center.

Since the 1991 establishment of a multi-party political system CESTRAR has declared its political independence.

CESTRAR is affiliated with the International Trade Union Confederation.
