= Trade Union Congress of Tanzania =

TUCTA
- Trade Union' Congress of Tanzania
- Founded: 2000
- Headquarters: Dar es Salaam, Tanzania
- Location: Tanzania
- Members: 320,000
- Key people: Margaret Sitta, president Nestory Ngula, secretary general
- Affiliations: ITUC
- Website: Tucta.net

The Trade Union Congress of Tanzania (TUCTA) is a national trade union center in Tanzania. It has a membership of 320,000 and was formed in 2000 after the dissolution of the Tanzania Federation of Free Trade Unions (TFTU).

The TUCTA is affiliated with the International Trade Union Confederation.
