= Seychelles Federation of Workers' Unions =

SFWU
- Seychelles Federation of Workers' Unions
- Founded: 1964
- Headquarters: Victoria, Seychelles
- Location: Seychelles
- Key people: A. Robinson, general secretary
- Affiliations: ITUC

The Seychelles Federation of Workers' Unions (SFWU) is a national trade union center in Seychelles. It was founded in 1964 as the National Workers' Union and was subordinated to the Seychelles People's United Party.

The SFWU is affiliated with the International Trade Union Confederation.
