= Union of Trade Unions of Chad =

UST
- Union of Trade Unions of Chad
- Union des Syndicats du Tchad
- Founded: 1991
- Headquarters: N'Djaména, Chad
- Location: Chad
- Members: 25,000
- Key people: Djibrine Assali Hamdallah, secretary general Boukinebe Garka, chairman
- Affiliations: ITUC

The Union of Trade Unions of Chad (UST) is a trade union centre in Chad. It was formed originally in 1988 as the National Union of Chadian Workers (UNST). The UNST was dissolved briefly in 1990 and reemerged as the UST.

The UST is affiliated with the International Trade Union Confederation.
