= National Organization of Trade Unions =

Federation of trade unions in Uganda

NOTU
- National Organization of Trade Unions
- Founded: 1973
- Headquarters: Kampala
- Location: Uganda
- Members: 935,000 (2018)
- Key people: Wilson Owere, Chairman General; Peter Christopher Werikhe, Secretary General
- Affiliations: ITUC
- Website: notu.or.ug

The National Organization of Trade Unions (NOTU) is the largest national trade union center in Uganda with 25 affiliated unions representing 935,000 workers in 2018.

== Affiliates and membership ==
2018
Affiliate	Members
Amalgamated Transport and General Workers Union (ATGWU)	101,350
Uganda Beverage Tobacco and Allied Workers Union (UBTAWU)	3,962
Uganda Building Construction, Civil Engineering, Cement & Allied Workers’ Union (UBCCECAWU)	6,000
Uganda Government and Allied Workers’ Union (UGAWU)	5,300
National Union of Clerical, Commercial, Professional and Technical Employees (NUCCPTE)	213
National Union of Education Institutions (NUEI)	6,400
Uganda Mines, Metal and Allied Workers′ Union (UMMAWU)	10,000
National Union of Plantation and Agricultural Work (NUPAWU)	129,00
Uganda Communication Employees’ Union (UCEU)	221
Uganda Public Employees Union (UPEU)	10,500
Uganda Electricity and Allied Workers′ Union (UEAWU)	3,600
Uganda Railways Workers Union (URWU)	3,00
Uganda Hospitality Leisure and Allied Workers Union (UHLAWU)	23
Uganda Media Union (UMU) 1,104 4	1,104
Uganda Nurses and Midwives Union (UNMU)	5,000
Uganda Fisheries and Allied Workers Union (UFAWU)	1,500
Uganda National Teachers' Union (UNATU)	160,000
National Union of Co-operative Movement Workers’ Union (NUCMWU)	3,545
Uganda Horticultural, Industrial, Service Providers and Allied Workers Union (UHISPAWU)	1,000
Uganda Mine, Metal, Oil, Gas and Allied Workers’ Union (UMMOGAWU)	1,767
National Union of Theatrical, Domestic and General Workers (NUTDGW)	17,500
National Union of Infrastructural, Civil Works and Wood Workers (NUICWWW)	2,929
Uganda Hotels, Food, Tourism and Allied Workers Union (UHFTAWU)	52,000
Uganda Printers, Polyfibre and Allied Workers Union (UPPAWU)	1,329
National Union of Government and Allied Workers (NUGAW)	5,000
Uganda Private Teachers Union (UPTU)	500
Uganda Bakers, Brewers, Millers and Allied Workers Union (UBBMAWU)	10,005
Uganda Local Government Workers Union (ULGWU)	1,200
Uganda Civil Society Organizations Workers’ Union (UCSOWU)	1,214
National Union of Creative, Performing Artists and Allied Workers (NUCPAAW)	755
Uganda Journalists Union (UJU)	1,000
Uganda Markets and Allied Employees Union (UMAEU)	400,00
