= Timeline of New Orleans =

Coordinates: 29.966667°N 90.05°W

The following is a timeline of the history of the city of New Orleans, Louisiana, USA.

Historical affiliations

Kingdom of France 1718–1763
Kingdom of Spain 1763–1802
French First Republic 1802–1803
United States of America 1803–1861
State of Louisiana 1861
Confederate States of America 1861–1862
United States of America 1862–present

== 18th century ==
- 1718 – La Nouvelle-Orléans founded by Jean-Baptiste Le Moyne de Bienville of the Mississippi Company.
- 1722 – Capital of La Louisiane is relocated to New Orleans, from Biloxi.
- 1724 - Code Noir implemented in Congo Square gave enslaved Africans Sundays off "to dance".
- 1734 – Ursuline Convent built.
- 1752 – Modern-day Ursuline Convent building is finished, today the oldest and finest French Colonial building in the U.S.
- 1762 – French colony ceded to Spain under Alejandro O'Reilly.
- 1768 - Population: 3.200. (approx).
- 1769 - New Orleans City Archives established.
- 1770s – Lafitte's Blacksmith Shop was built, one of the oldest extant buildings in New Orleans.
- 1779–1781 – Governor-general Bernardo de Gálvez successfully wages the Gulf Coast campaign against British West Florida, as part of the Anglo-Spanish War (1779–83) and in support of the American Revolutionary War.
- 1788
  - Great New Orleans Fire.
  - Lafayette Square laid out (approximate date), by the Surveyor-general Charles Trudeau, who would later serve as interim mayor.
  - Madame John's Legacy was built, today a rare example of a raised cottage in the French Quarter.
- 1789 – Saint Louis Cemetery established.
- 1792 – Theatre de la Rue Saint Pierre opened.
- 1794
  - 2nd Great New Orleans Fire
  - St. Louis Cathedral built on the site of an earlier Catholic church.
  - Carondelet Canal constructed.
- 1799 – Cabildo (seat of Spanish colonial city hall ) rebuilding completed.

== 19th century ==
=== 1800s–1840s ===
- 1801 – France regains power, on paper.
- 1803
  - Napoleon sells a huge swath of North America to the U.S. via the Louisiana Purchase. Formalities of the Spanish transfer to France and the French cession to the United States do not take place until November and December, at the Cabildo; with Upper Louisiana (St. Louis)'s ceremony occurring in the spring of 1804.
  - Etienne de Boré becomes the first mayor, under territorial Governor William C. C. Claiborne.
  - Population: 10,000. (approx).
- 1804
  - Orleans Gazette newspaper begins publication.
  - The Territory of Orleans (future state of Louisiana) is established, with the seat of government in New Orleans.
- 1805 – New Orleans incorporated as a city
- 1806 – New Orleans Mechanics Society instituted.
- 1810 – Population: 17,242.
- 1811 – Largest slave revolt in American history occurs nearby, with Orleans Parish involved in its aftermath.
- 1812
  - April – Louisiana becomes a state, with New Orleans as its first capital.
  - August – 1812 Louisiana hurricane
- 1813 – The Presbytere built.
- 1815
  - January – Battle of New Orleans
  - Charity Hospital built.
  - Théâtre d'Orléans opens.
- 1816 – First licensed pharmacist in the United States, Louis J. Dufilho Jr.
- 1817 – First Congregational Church built.
- 1818 – Fort Pike built.
- 1822 – Fort Macomb built.
- 1824
  - American Theatre built.
  - Pontchartrain Hotel built at Spanish Fort.
  - Camp Street Theatre becomes the first English language theater constructed in New Orleans.
- 1827
  - L’Abeille de la Nouvelle-Orléans newspaper begins publication.
  - Algiers ferry in operation, which has run continuously to the present day.
  - Students dance through the streets in masks in the first recognized New Orleans Mardi Gras.
- 1830 – Introduction of natural gas
- 1831 – Pontchartrain Railroad begins operating.
- 1832 – First steam-powered cotton press
- 1833 – Lafayette Cemetery is founded.
- 1834 – Medical College of Louisiana and U.S. Mint established.
- 1835
  - New Orleans and Carrollton Railroad begins operating, which became today's streetcar lines.
  - U.S. military barracks and First Presbyterian Church built.
  - St. Charles Theatre in operation.
  - Convent of the Holy Family founded.
- 1836
  - City is divided into three municipalities, which system existed for about twenty years.
  - St. Louis Hotel in business.
  - Female Orphan Asylum in operation.
- 1837
  - The Picayune newspaper begins publication.
  - U.S. economic recession begins with the Panic of 1837.
  - Christ Church built.
- 1838
  - St. Charles Hotel in business.
  - New Basin Canal opens, connecting uptown and the lakefront.
  - St. Vincent De Paul Church built.
- 1840
  - Population reaches approximately 102,000 or double the 1830 population. At this point, New Orleans is the wealthiest city in the nation, the third-most populous city, and the largest city in the South. (New York City's population was 312,000. Baltimore and New Orleans were the same size, with Baltimore showing only 100 more people.)
  - Beginning of the city's public school system
  - 25th anniversary celebration of the Battle of New Orleans victory, with former President Andrew Jackson in attendance
  - Antoine's restaurant in business.
  - St. Patrick's Church built.
  - Cypress Grove Cemetery and First German Lutheran Congregation established.
- 1841
  - The Boston Club formed.
  - St. Augustine Church founded.
- 1842
  - St. Augustine Church dedicated.
  - Holy Family Sisters founded.
- 1844 - 824 Canal Street built by James Gallier for Dr William Newton Mercer, a planter from Mississippi who served as a surgeon in the War of 1812.
- 1845 – City Hall built.
- 1846
  - Public School Library, 1st District, established.
  - Jackson monument erected.
  - De Bow's Commercial Review begins publication.
- 1847 – University of Louisiana Law School opens.
- 1849
  - State capital is relocated to the then-small-town of Baton Rouge.
  - Flood.

=== 1850s–1890s ===
- 1850's - St. Louis Cathedral rebuilding completed.
- 1852
  - Lafayette becomes part of city.
  - Union Race Course opens.
  - Touro Infirmary founded.

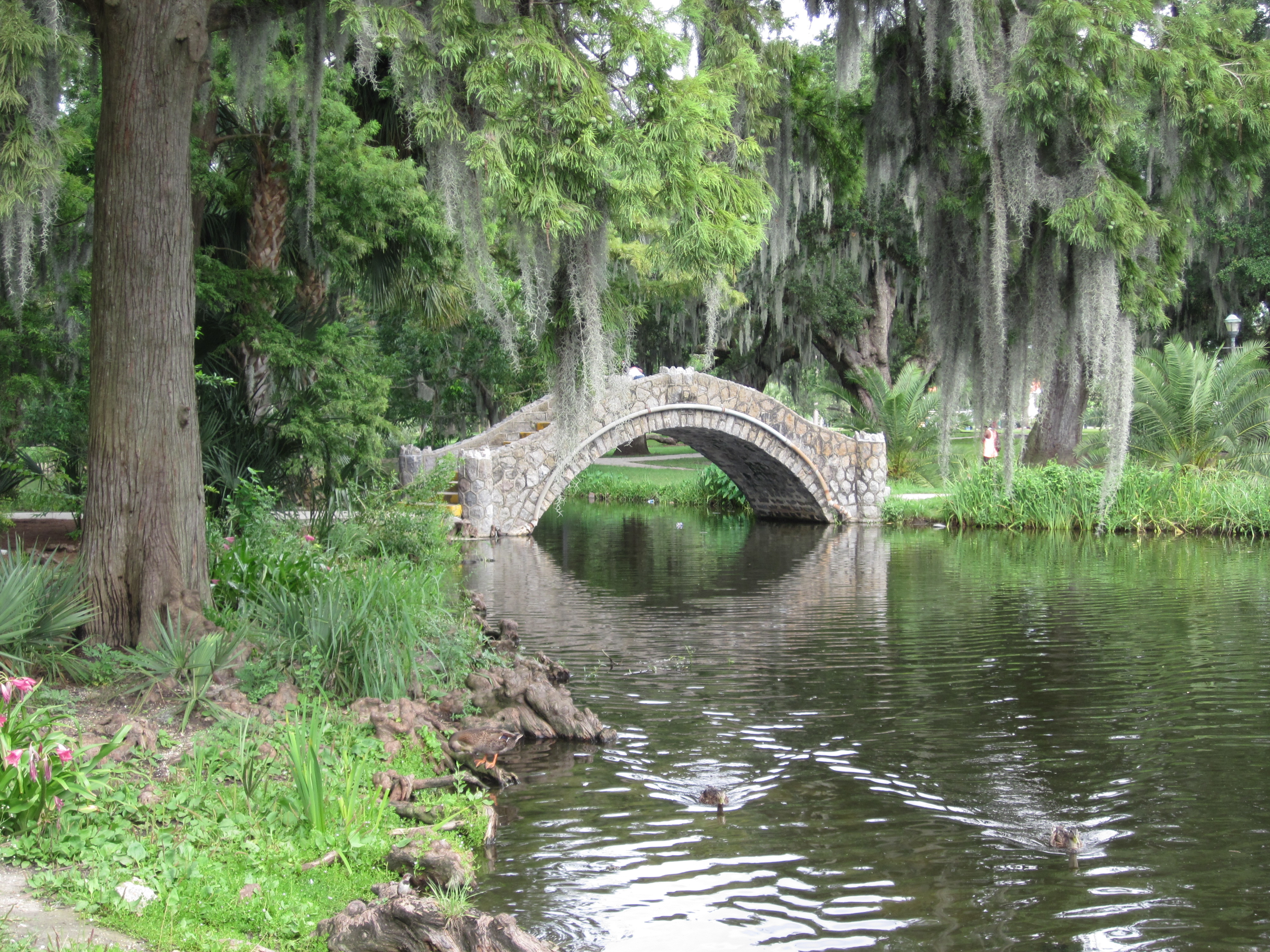
City Park, Bayou Bridge

- 1853
  - City Park established.
  - Major yellow fever epidemic.
- 1855 – Swiss Benevolent Society founded.
- 1856
  - Mistick Krewe of Comus founded.
  - Last Island hurricane dumps 13 inches of rainfall on the city.
  - Texas and New Orleans Railroad founded.
- 1857
  - Saint Alphonsus Church built.
  - The Pickwick Club formed.
- 1859
  - French Opera House opens.
  - Locust Grove Cemetery established.
- 1860
  - Louisiana Historical Society incorporated.
  - St. Mary's Assumption Church built.
  - Population: 168,675.
- 1861 – January – Louisiana votes to secede from the Union.
- 1862
  - Capture of New Orleans by Union forces.
  - Café du Monde in business.
  - Harmony Club formed.
- 1863 – New-Orleans Times newspaper begins publication.
- 1866 – New Orleans riot
- 1867 – Another in the long series of yellow fever epidemics; this one took its toll in Texas, as well.
- 1868
  - Louisiana readmitted to the Union.
  - Straight University founded.
- 1869 – New Orleans University founded.
- 1870
  - Algiers and Jefferson City annexed.
  - Leland College established.
  - Population: 191,418.
- 1871
  - New Orleans Cotton Exchange established.
  - Audubon Park established.
- 1874
  - Carrollton annexed.
  - Battle of Liberty Place, white insurrection against the Reconstruction government.
- 1876
  - St. Roch Cemetery chapel dedicated.
  - New Orleans Lawn Tennis Club and Athénée Louisianais founded.
- 1879 – Unsightly beggar ordinance effected.
- 1880 – Population: 216,090.
- 1881 – Southern University opens.
- 1882 - Flood.
- 1883 – Theatre built at Spanish Fort.
- 1884 – World Cotton Centennial held.
- 1886
  - Christ Church Cathedral founded.
  - New Orleans Camera Club organized.
- 1887 – Howard Memorial Library built.
- 1889 – Louisiana Historical Association founded.
- 1890
  - Confederate Memorial Hall built. Commander's Palace restaurant opens.
  - Jefferson City Buzzards Mardi Gras Marching Club formed and will live to become the oldest marching club.
  - Population: 242,039.
- 1891
  - Jackson Brewery building constructed.
  - Liberty Monument erected.
  - Italian troubles of 1891.
- 1892
  - New Orleans Union Station opens.
  - Street Railway Union established.
  - June – Homer Plessy arrested.
  - 1892 New Orleans general strike.

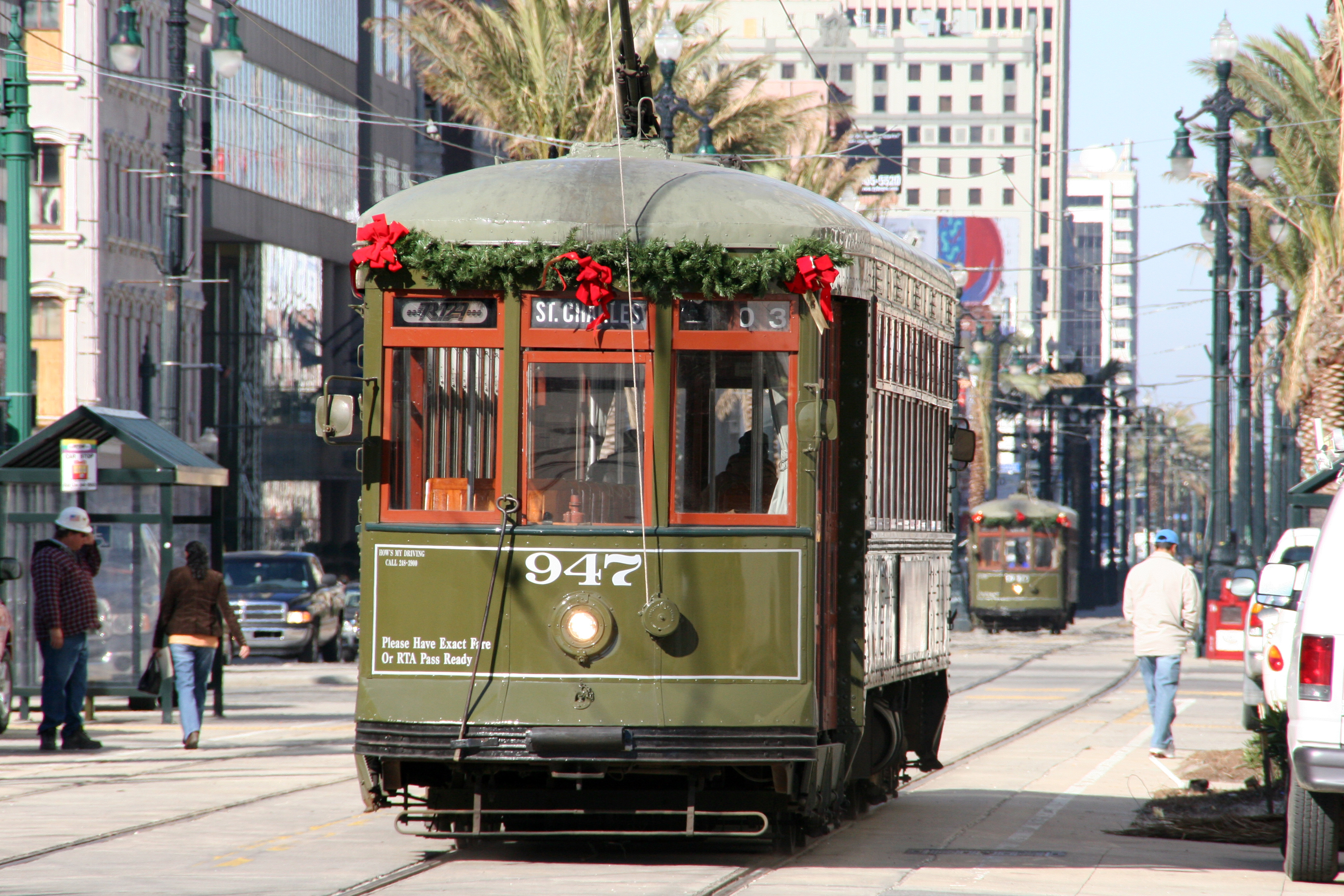
Electric streetcars introduced to Louisiana

- 1893
  - Electric streetcars begin operating.
  - The Roosevelt New Orleans Hotel opens as Hotel Grunewald.
- 1894 – U.S. Naval Station built.
- 1895
  - 1895 New Orleans dockworkers riot
  - Hennen Building completed.
- 1896 – Fisk Free and Public Library opens.
- 1897 – Storyville district established.
- 1898 - City Board of Health created.
- 1900
  - Robert Charles Riots
  - Art Association of New Orleans founded.
  - Development of Garden District concluded.
  - Population: 287,104.

== 20th century ==
=== 1900s–1940s ===
- 1901 – Louisiana hurricane causes much flooding in the city, due partly to the overflowing Carondelet Canal.
- 1904 – Loyola College established.
- 1905 – Galatoire's restaurant in business.
- 1906
  - Louisiana State Museum founded.
  - Beth Israel synagogue opens.
- 1907
  - Dixie Brewing Company in business.
  - New Orleans Library Club formed.
  - White City amusement park in business.
- 1908 – New Orleans Public Library main branch building opens.
- 1909 – The Grand Isle hurricane causes much New Orleans flooding.
- 1910 – Population: 339,075.
- 1911 – Delgado Museum of Art and Young Women's Christian Association (YWCA) of New Orleans established.
- 1914 – Audubon Zoo established.
- 1915
  - Xavier College established.
  - 1915 New Orleans hurricane inflicts great wind damage, destroying churches and the Presbytere's cupola.
- 1916 – Our Lady of Holy Cross College and Zulu Social Aid & Pleasure Club established.
- 1917
  - Livery Stable Blues recorded by the Original Dixieland Jass Band.
  - Storyville closed.
- 1918
  - 1918 influenza epidemic.
  - Arnaud's restaurant in business.
- 1919 – The French Opera House is destroyed by fire
- 1920
  - Broussard's restaurant in business.
  - Population: 387,219.
- 1921
  - Delgado Central Trades School opens.
  - Orpheum Theater in operation.
  - Hibernia Bank Building constructed.
- 1922 - WWL radio begins broadcasting.
- 1923
  - WDSU radio begins broadcasting.
  - Notre Dame Seminary founded.
  - Roosevelt Hotel in business.
  - Industrial Canal Lock built.
  - Isidor "Izzy" Einstein investigates the city's adherence to Prohibition.
- 1924
  - New Orleans Item-Tribune newspaper begins publication.
  - Women's "Petit Salon" organized.
- 1925
  - WSMB radio begins broadcasting.
  - Lakeview Presbyterian Church built.
- 1926
  - WBNO and WJBW radio begin broadcasting.
  - State Palace Theatre built.
  - Tulane Stadium opens.
- 1927
  - Saenger Theatre opens.
  - First National Bank of Commerce Building constructed.
  - Pontchartrain Hotel in business.
  - Rainiest Mardi Gras ever
  - Good Friday Flood
  - St. Bernard Parish and east bank of Plaquemines Parish flooded by demolition of the Caernarvon levee.
- 1928 – Pontchartrain Beach amusement park opens.
- 1929
  - National American Bank Building constructed.
  - New Orleans streetcar strike.
- 1930
  - Dillard University chartered.
  - Municipal Auditorium opens.
  - Broadmoor Improvement Association formed.
  - Population: 458,762.
- 1932 – Bureau of Governmental Research established.
- 1933
  - O'Brien's in business.
  - Krewe Rex cancels parade due to weather - only time.
- 1935 – Sugar Bowl begins.
- 1936 – New Orleans Botanical Garden opens.
- 1937 – New Orleans Roosevelt Review begins publication.
- 1938
  - Zurich Classic of New Orleans golf tournament begins.
  - Vieux Carré Property Owners, Residents, and Associates preservation group incorporated.
- 1939
  - Charity Hospital built.
  - Lincoln Beach amusement park in business.
- 1943 - New Orleans Opera Association formed.
- 1946
  - Moisant International Airport opens.
  - Foreign trade zone established in the Port of New Orleans.
  - New Orleans Baptist Theological Seminary formed.
- 1947
  - Joy Theater opens.
  - New Orleans Emergency Medical Services established.
  - September hurricane creates tremendous flooding, shutting down Moisant Airport.
- 1948 - WDSU-TV (television) begins broadcasting.
- 1949 – Middle South Utilities in business.

=== 1950s–1990s ===
- 1950 – New Orleans Pharmacy Museum opens.
- 1951 - St. Augustine High School opens to educate African-American young men preparing for college.
- 1953 - WJMR-TV (television) begins broadcasting.
- 1954
  - McDonogh Day Boycott
  - New Orleans Union Passenger Terminal opens.
- 1956
  - Louisiana State University in New Orleans and Southern University at New Orleans established.
  - Lake Pontchartrain Causeway opens.
- 1957
  - Pontchartrain Expressway opens.
  - Harvey Tunnel built.
- 1958 – Greater New Orleans Bridge opens.
- 1959 - WVUE-TV (television) begins broadcasting.
- 1960 – November 14: Desegregation of New Orleans Public Schools begins, with The New Orleans Four (Gail Etienne, Ruby Bridges, Leona Tate and Tessie Prevost) Gail, Leona and Tessie enrolled at McDonogh 19 Elementary and Ruby enrolled at William Frantz Elementary.
- 1965
  - Annual Marathon race begins.
  - I-10 Twin Span Bridge opens.
  - Hurricane Betsy causes great damage to the city, the worst before Katrina 40 years later.
- 1966 – Historic New Orleans Collection and Amistad Research Center established.
- 1967
  - New Orleans Saints football team formed.
  - International Trade Mart building constructed.
- 1969
  - Plaza Tower built.
  - Hurricane Camille inflicts $320 million damage in Louisiana.
- 1970 – Jazz Fest begins.
- 1972 – One Shell Square built.
- 1973
  - UpStairs Lounge arson attack
  - Sniper Mark Essex attacks police in a shooting spree at a Howard Johnsons hotel.
  - New Orleans Center for Creative Arts opened.
- 1974
  - New Orleans Jazz basketball team formed.
  - Preservation Resource Center founded.
- 1975
  - Superdome opens.
  - WYLD-FM begins airing in an R&B format.
- 1978
  - Ernest N. Morial is elected as city's first African-American mayor.
  - New Orleans Academy of Fine Arts established.
- 1979
  - K-Paul's Louisiana Kitchen in business.
  - Annual Crescent City Classic running race begins.
  - New Orleans Regional Transit Authority established.
  - New Orleans Jazz basketball team relocates to Utah and becomes the Utah Jazz.
- 1980
  - Longue Vue House and Gardens opens.
  - Radio WWOZ begins broadcasting.
- 1981 – New Orleans Mint museum active.
- 1983
  - Lakefront Arena opens.
  - Luling Bridge opens.
  - Pontchartrain Beach amusement park closes.
- 1984
  - French Quarter Festival begins.
  - Convention Center opens.
  - 1984 Louisiana World Exposition
  - Place St. Charles built.
- 1986 – Tennessee Williams/New Orleans Literary Festival begins. Ends a few months later
- 1988 – 1988 Republican National Convention
- 1989 – New Orleans Film Society founded.
- 1990
  - Emeril's restaurant in business.
  - Aquarium of the Americas opens.
  - Bayou Sauvage National Wildlife Refuge established.
  - Population: 496,938.
- 1991 – Louisiana Philharmonic Orchestra formed.
- 1994 – New Orleans Jazz National Historical Park created.
- 1995
  - Essence Music Festival begins.
  - May 1995 Louisiana flood
- 1998 – City website online (approximate date).
- 1999 – Voodoo Fest of music begins
  - Mother's Day bus crash
- 2000
  - National World War II Museum opens.
  - Six Flags New Orleans theme park opened (closed 2005); initially called Jazzland.
  - Population: 484,674.

== 21st century ==
=== 2000s ===
- 2001 – New Orleans Bowl begins.
- 2002
  - Charlotte Hornets basketball team relocates to New Orleans and becomes the New Orleans Hornets.
  - New Orleans VooDoo football team formed.
- 2003
  - Iron Rail Book Collective founded.
  - Ogden Museum of Southern Art established.
  - John McDonogh High School shooting
- 2004 – Christmas Eve snowstorm
- 2005
  - August – Hurricane Katrina; levee failures.
  - September – Hurricane Rita.
  - Bring New Orleans Back Commission formed.
  - Big Easy Rollergirls established.
- 2006
  - World Cultural Economic Forum begins.
  - January – Chocolate City speech.
- 2008
  - Hurricane Gustav
  - Prospect New Orleans art exhibit begins.
  - Audubon Insectarium opens.
- 2009 – Joseph Cao becomes U.S. Representative for Louisiana's 2nd congressional district, Congress's first Vietnamese American member.

=== 2010s ===
- 2010
  - Population: 343,829. The New Orleans Saints win Super Bowl XLIV on February 7, 2010, bringing home the city's first ever major professional league sports title.
  - Mitch Landrieu elected mayor
  - Treme (TV series) debuts
  - Deepwater Horizon oil disaster
- 2011 - Cedric Richmond becomes U.S. representative for Louisiana's 2nd congressional district.
- 2012
  - BlightStatus city app launched.
  - Hurricane Isaac creates widespread power outages.
- 2013 - New Orleans Hornets basketball team renames themselves the New Orleans Pelicans in an effort to localize its name and identity.
- 2014
  - Former mayor Nagin sentenced to prison.
  - Fictional program NCIS New Orleans debuts premiere episode on WWL, part of the wider NCIS franchise set in the city
- 2015
  - 200th anniversary commemoration of the Battle of New Orleans.
  - Population: 386,617 (estimate).
- 2016 - Population: 387,200
- 2017
  - August-Solar Eclipse during August 21, 2017
  - Population: 389,157
  - Removal of Robert E. Lee Statue and other prominent monuments to the Confederacy
- 2018
  - Population: 392,120
  - LaToya Cantrell elected mayor
- 2019
  - Population: 395,429 (estimation)
  - A new Hard Rock Hotel and Casino being constructed in the city partially collapses, causing a large search effort.

=== 2020s ===
- 2021 - Hurricane Ida makes landfall in Louisiana, passing through New Orleans on the 16th anniversary of Hurricane Katrina.
- 2025 - Population : 421,987 (estimate)

== See also ==
- History of New Orleans
- List of mayors of New Orleans
- List of National Historic Landmarks in Louisiana
- National Register of Historic Places listings in Orleans Parish, Louisiana
- Timeline of Louisiana
- Other cities in Louisiana:
  - Timeline of Baton Rouge, Louisiana
  - Timeline of Shreveport, Louisiana

== Bibliography ==
=== Published in 19th century ===
- "New Orleans". Kimball & James' Business Directory for the Mississippi Valley. Cincinnati: Printed by Kendall & Barnard. 1844. hdl:2027/chi.20799213 – via HathiTrust.
- New Orleans annual and commercial register of 1846, New Orleans: E.A. Michel & Co., 1845, OCLC 17557024, OL 7000660M
- Benjamin Moore Norman (1845), Norman's New Orleans and environs, New Orleans: B.M. Norman, OCLC 27113724, OL 13488380M
- Cohen's New Orleans Directory. Printed at the Office of the Picayune. 1855.
- New Orleans Business Directory. A. Mygatt & Company. 1858.
- Catalogue of the Library of the Lyceum and Library Society, First District, City of New Orleans, New Orleans: Printed by R. C. Kerr, 1858, OCLC 2582485, OL 6914356M
- "Mississippi River: New Orleans". James' River Guide ... Mississippi Valley. Cincinnati: U.P. James. 1860. hdl:2027/nyp.33433081817672. 1871 ed.
- Gardner's New Orleans Directory, New Orleans: Charles Gardner, 1861, OL 24351366M
- Gardner's New Orleans Directory, New Orleans: Charles Gardner, 1866 – via Google Books
- "New Orleans". Commercial Directory of the Western States. St. Louis: Richard Edwards. 1867.
- Edwin L. Jewell (1874), Jewell's Crescent City Illustrated, New Orleans: Arcadia Publishing, OL 23363731M
- New Orleans City Directory. L. Soards & Co. 1875 – via HathiTrust.
  - 1878
  - 1883
- Joseph Sabin, ed. (1881). "New Orleans". Bibliotheca Americana. Vol. 13. New York: J. Sabin. OCLC 13972268.
- Cable, George Washington (1884). "New Orleans" . Encyclopædia Britannica. Vol. 17 (9th ed.).
- Street railway guide to the city of New Orleans and its suburbs, New Orleans: Fountain & Christian, 1884, OCLC 6152208, OL 6905239M
- Historical sketch book and guide to New Orleans and environs, New York: W.H. Coleman, 1885, OL 14553933M

=== Published in 20th century ===
- Robert C. Brooks (1901), "New Orleans", Bibliography of Municipal Problems and City Conditions, Municipal Affairs, vol. 5 (2nd ed.), New York: Reform Club, OCLC 1855351
- The Picayune's guide to New Orleans (6th ed.), New Orleans, La: The Picayune, 1904, OCLC 17833074, OL 6937573M
- Henry C. Castellanos (1905). New Orleans as It Was: Episodes of Louisiana Life (2nd ed.). L. Graham Company, Limited.
- "New Orleans" . Encyclopædia Britannica. Vol. 19 (11th ed.). 1910. pp. 526–532.
- New Orleans Association of Commerce (1911), New Orleans, what to see and how to see it, New Orleans: Louisiana Printing Co., Ltd., OL 22887754M
- New Orleans City Directory. Soards Directory Co. 1912 – via HathiTrust.
  - 1913
- Edward Hungerford (1913), "Old French Lady of the Riverbank", The Personality of American Cities, New York: McBride, Nast & Company
- John Smith Kendall (1922), History of New Orleans, Chicago: The Lewis publishing company, OCLC 1836396, OL 6649193M
- Federal Writers' Project of the Works Progress Administration for the city of New Orleans (1938). "Chronology". New Orleans City Guide. Boston: Houghton Mifflin.
- Federal Writers' Project (2007) [1941]. "New Orleans". Louisiana: a Guide to the State. American Guide Series. NY: Hastings House. p. 316+. hdl:2027/uc1.$b727648. ISBN 9780403021697.
- Albert A. Fossier. New Orleans, the Glamour Period, 1800–1840. New Orleans, La.: Pelican, 1957.
- L. Vaughan Howard; Robert S. Friedman (1959). Government in metropolitan New Orleans. Tulane Univ.
- Robert Reinders and John Duffy. End of an Era: New Orleans, 1850–1860. New Orleans, La.: Pelican, 1964.
- Martin Siegel (1975), Howard B. Furer (ed.), New Orleans: a Chronological & Documentary History, 1539–1970, American Cities Chronology Series, Dobbs Ferry, N.Y.: Oceana Publications, ISBN 0379006014
- Ory Mazar Nergal, ed. (1980), "New Orleans", Encyclopedia of American Cities, New York: E.P. Dutton, OL 4120668M
- Holli, Melvin G., and Jones, Peter d'A., eds. Biographical Dictionary of American Mayors, 1820-1980 (Greenwood Press, 1981) short scholarly biographies each of the city's mayors 1820 to 1980. online; see index at p. 409 for list.
- Walter G. Cowan et al. New Orleans Yesterday and Today: A Guide to the city. Baton Rouge: Louisiana State University Press, 1983.
- Arnold R. Hirsch and Joseph Logsdon, eds. Creole New Orleans: Race and Americanization. Baton Rouge: Louisiana State University Press, 1992.
- Leonard V. Huber (1997), New Orleans Architecture Vol III: Cemeteries, Pelican Publishing Company, ISBN 9781565542709, OCLC 58427192, OL 8665182M, 1565542703
- Virginia Meacham Gould (2000). "New Orleans". In Paul Finkelman (ed.). Encyclopedia of the United States in the Nineteenth Century. Charles Scribner's Sons. ISBN 0684805006.

=== Published in 21st century ===
- New Orleans (3rd ed.), Melbourne: Lonely Planet, 2003, OL 23010391M
- Oren M. Levin-Waldman (2004). The Political Economy of the Living Wage: A Study of Four Cities. M.E. Sharpe. ISBN 978-0-7656-3705-5. (Baltimore, Detroit, Los Angeles, New Orleans)
- David Marley (2005), "United States: New Orleans", Historic Cities of the Americas, vol. 2, Santa Barbara, California: ABC-CLIO, p. 565+, ISBN 1576070271
- "Guide to Genealogical Materials in the New Orleans Public Library's Louisiana Division & City Archives" (4th ed.). New Orleans Public Library. 2005.
- Richard Campanella (2006). Geographies of New Orleans: Urban Fabrics Before the Storm. Lafayette: University of Louisiana, Center for Louisiana Studies
- David Goldfield, ed. (2007). "New Orleans, Louisiana". Encyclopedia of American Urban History. Sage. ISBN 978-1-4522-6553-7.
- Anna Hartnell (2009), "Katrina Tourism and a Tale of Two Cities: Visualizing Race and Class in New Orleans", American Quarterly, vol. 61
- Michael E. Crutcher Jr. Tremé: Race and Place in a New Orleans Neighborhood (Athens, GA: University of Georgia Press, 2010)
- Lake Douglas. Public Spaces, Private Gardens: A History of Designed Landscapes in New Orleans (Baton Rouge: Louisiana State University Press, 2011)
- Raj Chetty; Nathaniel Hendren (2015), City Rankings, Commuting Zones: Causal Effects of the 100 Largest Commuting Zones on Household Income in Adulthood, Equality of Opportunity Project, Harvard University, archived from the original on May 6, 2015, "Rank #99: New Orleans"
- Southern Foodways Alliance, University of Mississippi (2015), New Orleans: Past, Prospect, and Pop (bibliography)
