= Labour movement =

Economic and political movement seeking to advance workers

The labour movement (Note: Alternatively labor; See American and British English spelling differences.) is the collective organisation of working people to further their shared political and economic interests. It consists of the trade union or labour union movement, as well as political parties of labour. It can be considered an instance of class conflict.

- In trade unions, workers campaign for higher wages, better working conditions and fair treatment from their employers, and through the implementation of labour laws, from their governments. They do this through collective bargaining, sectoral bargaining, and when needed, strike action. In some countries, co-determination gives representatives of workers seats on the board of directors of their employers.
- Political parties formed to represent the interests of organised labour campaign for labour rights, social security and the welfare state. They are often called a labour party or a workers' party. Some parties using the name social democratic party or socialist party are also of this type, with affiliated unions having a role in party structure, although such parties may be independent of the trade union movement.
- The cooperative movement campaigns to replace capitalist ownership of the economy with worker cooperatives, consumer cooperatives, and other types of cooperative ownership. This is related to the concept of economic democracy.

The labour movement developed as a response to capitalism and the Industrial Revolution of the late 18th and early 19th centuries, at about the same time as socialism. The early goals of the movement were the right to unionise, the right to vote, democracy, safe working conditions and the 40-hour week. As these were achieved in many of the advanced economies of Western Europe and North America in the early decades of the 20th century, the labour movement expanded to issues of welfare and social insurance, wealth distribution and income distribution, public services like health care and education, social housing and in some cases common ownership.

== History ==
Labor is prior to, and independent of, capital. Capital is only the fruit of labor, and could never have existed if labor had not first existed. Labor is the superior of capital, and deserves much the higher consideration.

— Abraham Lincoln, December 3, 1861

=== Origins in the United Kingdom ===
The labour movement has its origins in Europe during the Industrial Revolution of the late 18th and early 19th centuries, when agricultural and cottage industry jobs were replaced as mechanization and industrialization moved employment to more industrial areas like factory towns, causing an influx of low-skilled labour and decline in living standards for workers in urban areas. Prior to the industrial revolution, economies in Europe were dominated by the guild system, each of which were expected to protect the interests of its owners, labourers, and consumers through the regulation of standard business practices.

However, as the increasingly oligarchic guild system deteriorated in the 16th and 17th centuries, spontaneous formations of journeymen within the guilds would occasionally united to demand better wages and conditions, and these ad hoc groupings can be considered the forerunners of the modern labour movement. Nevertheless, without the continuous technological and international trade pressures during the Industrial Revolution, these trade unions remained sporadic and localised only to certain regions and professions—including trade unions formed in the United Kingdom during the 18th century—as there was not yet enough impetus for the formation of a widespread labour movement. Therefore, the labour movement is usually marked as beginning concurrently with the Industrial Revolution in the United Kingdom, roughly around 1760–1830.

==== 16th and 17th centuries ====
In England the guild system was usurped in its regulation of wages by parliament in the 16th century with the passage of the Elizabethan Era apprentice laws such as the Statute of Artificers 1562 which placed the power to regulate wages and employment in the hands of local officials in each parish. Parliament had been responding to petitions made by English weavers in 1555 who asserted that the owners were "giving much less wages and hire for weaving of clothes than they did in the past." This legislation was intended to ensure just compensation for workers throughout the country so they could maintain a "competent livelihood". This doctrine of parliamentary involvement remained in place until about 1700 at which point the practice of wage regulation began to decline, and in 1757 Parliament outright rescinded the Weavers Act 1756, abandoning its power of wage regulation and signalling its newfound dedication to laissez-faire economics.

The Elizabethan Apprentice Laws lasted in England until the early 19th century, but were becoming increasingly dead letter by the mid 18th century. Consequently, from 1760 on, real wages began to fall and food prices began to rise giving increased motivation for political and social agitation. As the guild system became increasingly obsolete and parliament abolished the old medieval labour protections, forswearing responsibility for maintaining living standards, the workers began to form the earliest versions of trade unions. The workers on the lowest rungs found it necessary to organise in new ways to protect their wages and other interests such as living standards and working conditions.

==== 18th century ====
There is no record of enduring trade unions existing prior to the 18th century. Beginning from 1700 onward there are records of complaints in the United Kingdom, which increase through the century, that show instances of labourers "combining" together to raise wages had become a phenomenon in various regions and professions. These early trade unions were fairly small and limited in scope and were separated from unions in other geographical areas or unions in other professions. The unions would strike, collectively bargain with employers, and, if that did not suffice, petition parliament for the enforcement of the Elizabethan statues. The first groups in England to practice early trade unionism were the West of England wool workers and the framework knitters in the Midlands. As early as 1718 a royal proclamation was given in opposition to the formation of any unsanctioned bodies of journeymen attempting to affect wages and employment. Despite the presumption that unionising was illegal, it continued throughout the 18th century.

Strikes and riots by miners and framework knitters occurred throughout England over the course of the 18th century, often resorting to machine breaking and sabotage. In 1751 wool-combers in Leicestershire formed a union which both disallowed hiring non-members and provided aid for out-of-work members. In the Spitalfields area of London, weavers went on strike and rioted in 1765, 1769, and 1773 until parliament relented and allowed justices in the area to fix wage rates. Artisans and workers would also create small craft clubs or trade clubs in each town or locality and these groups such as the hatters in London, shipwrights in Liverpool, or cutlers in Sheffield could use their clubs to unionize. Workers could also use the ubiquitous friendly societies, which had increasingly cropped up British society since 1700, as cover for union activities.

In politics, the MP John Wilkes used mass appeal to workers through public meetings, pamphleteering, and the popular press, in order to gain their support as he advocated for an increase in the voting franchise, popular rights, and an end to corruption. When he was imprisoned for criticizing King George III, his followers protested and were fired upon by the government at the Massacre of St George's Fields in 1768, which resulted in a round of strikes and riots throughout England. Other notable radicals at the time included John Jebb, Major Cartwright, and John Horne.

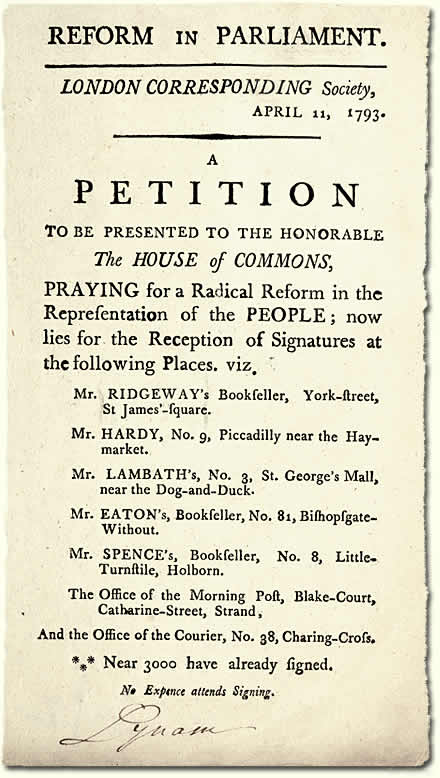
A handbill for the London Corresponding Society, the first political society in the United Kingdom focused on working-class politics

With the advent of the French Revolution, radicalism became even more prominent in English politics with the publication of Thomas Paine's The Rights of Man in 1791 and the foundation of the working-class focused London Corresponding Society in 1792. Membership in the society increased rapidly and by the end of the year it may have had as many as three thousand chapters in the United Kingdom.

Fearful of this new English Jacobinism, the government responded with wide-scale political repression spearheaded by prime minister Pitt the Younger. Paine was forced to flee the country after his work was deemed to be seditious, booksellers selling Paine's or other radical works were arrested, the Scottish reformers Thomas Muir, Rev. Thomas Fyshe Palmer, Joseph Gerrald, and Maurice Margarot were transported, and, in 1794, the leadership of the L.C.S was arrested and tried. Speech and public gatherings were tightly restricted by the Two Acts of 1795 which made certain words acts of treason, limited public gatherings to fifty people or fewer, and enforced licensing for anyone who wanted to speak in a public debate or lecture hall. In 1797 the L.C.S was outlawed by parliament, temporarily crushing the British labour movement. Additionally, forming unions or combinations was made illegal under legislation such as the 1799 Combination Act. Trade unionism in the United Kingdom illegally continued into the 19th century despite increasing hardship. Determined workers refused to allow the law to entirely eradicate trade unionism. Some employers chose to forgo legal prosecution and instead bargained and cooperated with workers' demands.

==== 19th century ====
The Scottish weavers of Glasgow went on strike around 1805, demanding enforcement of the old Elizabethan laws empowering magistrates to fix wages to meet the costs of living; however, after three weeks the strike was ended when the police arrested the strike leaders. A renewed stimulus to organised labour in the United Kingdom can be traced back to the 1808 failure of the 'Minimum Wage Bill' in parliament which supporters had seen as a needed countermeasure for the endemic poverty among the working classes of industrial United Kingdom. After the failure of the Minimum Wage Bill displayed the government's commitment to laissez-faire policy, labourers expressed their discontent in the form of the first large scale strikes in the new factory districts. Agitation did not end until it was agreed that weavers would receive a 20% increase in wages. In 1813 and 1814 Parliament would repeal the last of the apprentice laws which had been intended to protect wage rates and employment, but which had also fallen into serious disuse many decades before.

The United Kingdom saw an increasing number of large-scale strikes, mainly in the north. In 1811 in Nottinghamshire, a new movement known as the Luddite, or machine-breaker, movement, began. In response to declining living standards, workers all over the Midlands started to sabotage and destroy the machinery used in textile production. As the industry was still decentralized at the time and the movement was secretive, none of the leadership was ever caught and employers in the Midlands textile industry were forced to raise wages.

In 1812 the first radical, socialist, pro-labour society, the 'Society of Spencean Philanthropists', named after the radical social agitator Thomas Spence, was formed. Spence, a pamphleteer in London since 1776, believed in the socialized distribution of land and changing England into a federalized government based on democratically elected parish communes. The society was small and had only a limited presence in English politics. Other leaders such Henry Hunt, William Cobbet, and Lord Cochrane, known as Radicals, rose to the head of the labour movement demanding the lowering of taxes, the abolition of pensions and sinecures, and an end to payments of the war debt. This radicalism increased in the aftermath of the end of the Napoleonic Wars, as a general economic downturn in 1815 led to a revival in pro-labour politics. During this time, half of each worker's wages was taxed away, unemployment greatly increased, and food prices would not drop from their war time highs.

After the passage of the Corn Laws there was mass rioting throughout United Kingdom. Many working-class papers started being published and received by a wide audience, including Cobbet's "Weekly Political Register, Thomas Wooler's The Black Dwarf, and William Hone's Reformists's Register. In addition, new political clubs focused on reform, called Hampden Clubs, were formed after a model suggested by Major Cartwright. During a speech by Henry Hunt, a group of Spenceans initiated the Spa Fields riots. This outbreak of lawlessness led to a government crackdown on agitation in 1817 known as the Gagging Acts, which included the suppression of the Spencean society, a suspension of habeas corpus, and an extension of power to magistrates which gave them the ability to ban public gatherings. In protest of the Gagging Acts, as well as the poor working conditions in the textile industry, workers in Manchester attempted to march on London to deliver petitions in a demonstration known as the Blanketeers march, which ultimately failed.

From this point onward the British government also began using hired spies and agent provocateurs to disrupt the labour movement. The most infamous early case of government anti-labour espionage was that of Oliver the Spy who, in 1817, incited and encouraged the Pentrich Rising, which led to the leadership being indicted on treason charges and executed.

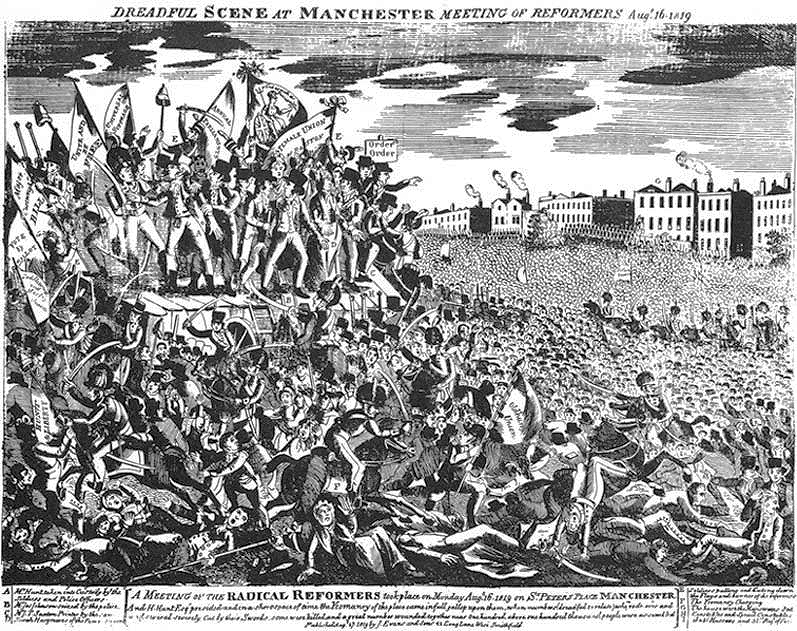
A contemporary depiction of the Peterloo Massacre which occurred on 16 August 1819

In spite of government suppression, the labour movement in the United Kingdom continued, and 1818 marked a new round of strikes as well as the first attempt at establishing a single national union that encompassed all trades, led by John Gast and named the "Philanthropic Hercules". Although this enterprise quickly folded, pro-labour political agitation and demonstrations increased in popularity throughout industrial United Kingdom culminating in 1819 with an incident in St. Peter's field, Manchester, known as the Peterloo Massacre. The British government responded with another round of draconian measures aimed at putting down the labour movement, known as the Six Acts.

In 1819 the social reformer Francis Place initiated a reform movement aimed at lobbying parliament into abolishing the anti-union Combination Acts. Unions were legalised in the Combination Acts of 1824 and 1825, however some union actions, such as anti-scab activities were restricted.

Chartism was possibly the first mass working-class labour movement in the world, originating in England during the mid-19th century between 1838 and 1848. It takes its name from the People's Charter of 1838, which stipulated the six main aims of the movement as:

- Suffrage for all men age 21 and over
- Voting by secret ballot
- Equal-sized constituencies
- Pay for Members of Parliament
- An end to the need for a property qualification for Parliament
- Annual election of Parliament

Eventually, after Chartism died out, the United Kingdom adopted the first five reforms. The Chartist movement had a lasting impact in the development of the political labour movement.

In the United Kingdom, the term "new unionism" was used in the 1880s to describe an innovative form of trade unionism. The new unions were generally less exclusive than craft unions and attempted to recruit a wide range of unskilled and semi-skilled workers, such as dockers, seamen, gasworkers and general labourers.

=== Worldwide ===
The International Workingmen's Association, the first attempt at international coordination, was founded in London in 1864. The major issues included the right of the workers to organize themselves, and the right to an 8-hour working day. In 1871 workers in France rebelled and the Paris Commune was formed. From the mid-19th century onward the labour movement became increasingly globalised:

Labour has been central to the modern globalization process. From issues of the embodied movement of workers to the emergence of a global division of labour, and organized responses to capitalist relations of production, the relevance of labour to globalization is not new, and it is far more significant in shaping the world than is usually recognized.

The movement gained major impetus during the late 19th and early 20th centuries from the Catholic Social Teaching tradition which began in 1891 with the publication of Pope Leo XIII's foundational document, Rerum novarum, also known as "On the Condition of the Working Classes", in which he advocated a series of reforms including limits on the length of the work day, a living wage, the elimination of child labour, the rights of labour to organise, and the duty of the state to regulate labour conditions.

Throughout the world, action by labourists has resulted in reforms and workers' rights, such as the two-day weekend, minimum wage, paid holidays, and the achievement of the eight-hour day for many workers. There have been many important labour activists in modern history who have caused changes that were revolutionary at the time and are now regarded as basic. For example, Mary Harris Jones, better known as "Mother Jones", and the National Catholic Welfare Council were important in the campaign to end child labour in the United States during the early 20th century.

Historically labour markets have often been constrained by national borders that have restricted movement of workers. Labour laws are also primarily determined by individual nations or states within those nations. While there have been some efforts to adopt a set of international labour standards through the International Labour Organisation (ILO), international sanctions for failing to meet such standards are very limited. In many countries labour movements have developed independently and represent those national boundaries.

== Overview ==
=== Political parties ===
Modern labour parties originated from an increase in organising activities in Europe and European colonies during the 19th century, such as the Chartist movement in the United Kingdom during 1838–48.

In 1891, localised labour parties were formed, by trade union members in British colonies in Australasia. In 1899, the Labour Party for the Colony of Queensland briefly formed the world's first labour government, lasting one week. From 1901, when six colonies federated to form the Commonwealth of Australia, several labour parties amalgamated to form the Australian Labor Party (ALP).

The British Labour Party was created as the Labour Representation Committee, following an 1899 resolution by the Trades Union Congress.

While archetypal labour parties are made of direct union representatives, in addition to members of geographical branches, some union federations or individual unions have chosen not to be represented within a labour party and/or have ended association with them.

Many individuals and political groups otherwise considered to represent ruling classes may be part of, and active in, the labour movement.

== Culture ==
=== Labour festivals ===
Labour festivals have long been a part of the labour movement. Often held outdoors in the summer, the music, talks, food, drink, and film have attracted hundreds of thousands of attendees each year. Labour festival is a yearly feast of all the unionism gathering, to celebrate the fulfillment of their goals, to bring solutions to certain hindrances and to reform unjust actions of their employers or government.

== Topics ==
=== Racial equality ===
A degree of strategic biracial cooperation existed among black and white dockworkers on the waterfronts of New Orleans, Louisiana during the early 20th century. Although the groups maintained racially separate labour unions, they coordinated efforts to present a united front when making demands of their employers. These pledges included a commitment to the "50-50" or "half-and-half" system wherein a dock crew would consist of 50% black and 50% white workers and agreement on a single wage demand to reduce the risk of ship owners pitting one race against the other. This cooperative framework, though exceptional for its time, was driven largely by the dockworkers' shared vulnerability to exploitative labour practices. The "half-and-half" rule became a symbol of solidarity and a practical mechanism to prevent racial division being used as a tool for wage suppression. Despite institutional segregation, joint action during strikes and negotiations fostered a culture of mutual dependence that challenged prevailing norms in the Jim Crow South. These alliances were not without tension, but they succeeded in stabilizing labour conditions and resisting employer manipulation. Over the decades, such practices influenced later union efforts to integrate labour representation and contributed to broader struggles for racial and economic justice in the American labour movement.

Black and white dockworkers also cooperated during protracted labour strikes, including the general levee strikes in 1892 and 1907 as well as smaller strikes involving skilled workers such as screwmen in the early 1900s:

Negroes in the United States read the history of labour and find it mirrors their own experience. We are confronted by powerful forces telling us to rely on the good will and understanding of those who profit by exploiting us [...] They are shocked that action organizations, sit-ins, civil disobedience and protests are becoming our everyday tools, just as strikes, demonstrations and union organization became yours to insure that bargaining power genuinely existed on both sides of the table [...] Our needs are identical to labor's needs: decent wages, fair working conditions, livable housing, old age security, health and welfare measures [...] That is why the labor-hater and labor-baiter is virtually always a twin-headed creature spewing anti-Negro epithets from one mouth and anti-labor propaganda from the other mouth.

— Martin Luther King, Jr, "If the Negro Wins, Labor Wins", December 11, 1961

== Contemporary ==
=== Development of an international labour movement ===
With ever-increasing levels of international trade and increasing influence of multinational corporations, there has been debate and action among labour movements to attempt international co-operation. This has resulted in renewed efforts to organize and collectively bargain internationally. A number of international union organizations have been established in an attempt to facilitate international collective bargaining, to share information and resources and to advance the interests of workers generally.

== See also ==
Labour federations:
- AFL–CIO
- Canadian Labour Congress
- General Confederation of Labour (France)
- Industrial Workers of the World
- List of international labour organizations

Political ideologies:

- Anarchism
- Anarcho-syndicalism
- Catholic social teaching
- Christian socialism
- Communism
- Council communism
- De Leonism
- Democratic socialism
- Marxism
- Syndicalism
- Social democracy
- Workerism

Topics:

- Catholic trade unions
- Class conflict
- Corporatism
- Critique of work
- International labour law
- Labour law
- Labour history including art and culture
- Left-wing politics
- Living wage
- New Unionism
- Social criticism

National movements

- Trade unions in Albania
- Trade unions in Algeria
- Trade unions in Andorra
- Trade unions in Angola
- Trade unions in Antigua and Barbuda
- Trade unions in Argentina
- Trade unions in Armenia
- Australian labour movement
- Trade unions in Benin
- Trade unions in Botswana
- Trade unions in Burkina Faso
- Trade unions in Egypt
- Trade unions in Ethiopia
- Trade unions in Germany
- Trade unions in Ghana
- Trade unions in India
- Iraqi Federation of Trade Unions
- Trade unions in Ireland
- Labour unions in Japan
- Trade unions in Malaysia
- Trade unions in Maldives
- Trade unions in Nauru
- Trade unions in Niger
- Trade unions in Oman
- Trade unions in Pakistan
- Trade unions in Qatar
- Trade unions in Senegal
- Trade unions in South Africa
- Trade unions in Spain
- Swedish labour movement
- Trade unions in Switzerland
- Labour movement in Taiwan
- Trade unions in Tanzania
- Trade unions in the United Kingdom
- Labor unions in the United States
