= Trade unions in Andorra =

International Labour Organization
- Andorra is not a member of the ILO
- Freedom of Association: Not ratified
- Right to Organise: Not ratified

Trade unions in Andorra have had a brief existence, with the first trade union, the Andorran Workers' Union (AWU), being formed in 1990.

The history of foreign trade unionism's involvement and effect on Andorran politics can be traced to 1933

== The Revolution of 1933 ==
=== The FHASA Strikes ===
The Revolution of 1933 is otherwise referred to and known as the "huelgas de FHASA" or the "FHASA strikes". The FHASA is a company that was created with the intention of building a hydroelectric plant in Andorra and help Andorran employment. Andorra wanted to bring in Industrialization. The revolution of 1933 can be seen as a followup to the revolution of 1881. Andorra had been operating under a decommodified society of economy that revolved around the pre-industrial economy throughout the 19th century. This pre-industrial economic model continued and overtime more Andorran citizens became vocal about their discontent with their country's economy calling for reform in their government. Social unrest grew and led to the beginnings of the revolution of 1881. The revolution of 1881 signifying a new turning point in the Andorran political sphere, driving Andorran representatives in the General Council (Andorran Parliament) to look for alternative economic models like industrialisation, in order to bring about economic resurgence. However, the government's interventions in the economy during this time period led to a further damage to the Andorran economy. With the turn of the 20th century, it was viewed that little progress was made since the 1881 revolution because nearly the same representatives were in the same seats of the General Council. These particular members of the General Council turned to the creation of an electric company known as FHASA in order to take steps towards the industrialization and stabilization of the economy.

The General Council asked FHASA to make Andorran citizens priority in the hiring process in order to reach an economic stability of Andorran households. However, labor jobs ended up consisting of a variety of people, a mix of Spanish, French, Galician, and Catalan. However, most of the technical well paying jobs belonged to Swiss. Many people of the Andorran public consequently marched. The mass of discontented people had alarmed the General Council to create Andorra's first police force in response to the protests to use as well as whenever it was deemed necessary, known as the Order Service in 1931. In the same year following Order Service's creation, the General Council passed another law establishing the creation of a registry where all foreigners would be recorded, as the country's first attempt at regulating immigration. Andorra's neighbors had also been undergoing a political transformation of their time known as the Labor Movement. This furthermore cultivated the Andorran citizens feelings towards reform amid political change. And due to growing poverty levels in Catalonia and France, the people upset with the state of their economy had mobilized and created their respective country's first unions. Andorran workers belonged to some of these Unions, such as the “Confederació Regional del Treball catalana”, otherwise known as a subsidiary branch of the CNT (el sindicat anarquista). This great membership of another Union outside of Andorra having influence on another country created problems for the General Council's leaders that held the beliefs of foreign workers not having labor rights. The council members also had not fully shared the ideas their workers. Andorran workers had steadily become more influential due to their cooperation as a growing political group of people known as d'Unió Andorrana (Andorran Union, advocating universal male suffrage, Labor rights, and the right to an education). But The Andorran Union was not influential enough to reform the government on its own through the Andorran political system. All workers, native and foreign, had advocated for worker rights and expected the government to meet their demands, but they had not. This led to an escalation led to the first strike of FHASA workers occurring in 1931. Strikes continued to 1933 until the General Council, with the assistance of the French police force, had begun to quell the protests. The demands rose out of anger against the poor working conditions that laborers were in due to the lack of existing legislation within the government that could serve as protection for workers against firms intending to abuse their power over employees. The employers such as the FHASA could change the employee's working conditions without consensus. Employees consequently received less than a livable wage, had increased work hours leading to an upset workforce banding together to voice their discontent.

== Foreign trade unions in Andorran politics (1970 – 1993) ==
Andorra had an increasing amount of foreign workers who joined trade unions in their respective country. These trade unions from Spain and France had then advocated for the rights of their member workers in Andorra. Andorra accepted the UN's Universal Declaration for Human Rights (UDHR) in April 1988. The UDHR describes “everyone has the right to form and join trade unions” in Article 23 Section 4. And because both sides of Andorra's borders had the nations of Spain and France forming unions with twenty thousand “guest workers” in Andorra, their respective unions advocated the laborer's given freedom of expression and right to strike as well as form unions. If Andorra accepts and acknowledges the right to form unions, then these unions would then be able to negotiate with the firms employing the guest workers. This development of foreign workers advocating for worker rights led to their Andorran native fellow workers also pushing for their own rights as laborers and demanding their rights of freedom of expression. This social development led to the General Council deciding to go back on the country's acceptance of the UDHR in order to maintain the status quo. This impending issue only grew in time since there was increasing amounts of immigration. Drastic increases in immigration over the years only made the workers' more vocal and prominent in their demands as the population spiked advocating for their workers rights. Andorra had passed increasing amounts immigration control precautions since their first anti-immigration reform of regulating immigration. Until 1970, only male third generation Andorran citizens above the age of twenty-five were allowed to vote. But in the year of 1970, the law became more inclusive by changing, allowing second generation Andorran citizens to vote, male or female. In 1977, art of the Andorran political referendum included first-generation citizens twenty-eight and older were given the right to vote. And in the year 1985, second generation citizens were allowed to be as young as twenty-one and have the right to vote. Andorra would later be called to create a written constitution that included the right of association and easier access to citizenship with the intervention of The Council of Europe's Commission for Political Affairs, in order to embody citizens' rights, called for rescinding the initial acceptance of the UDHR in 1988. The General Council reiterated the ban on unions and warned foreign workers would be expelled from the country if any worker joined a union. In 1989 a referendum was called. The Constitution of 1993 for Andorra permits the joining of unions for Andorran residents, as well as the organization of political parties.

Demographic Population Over Time
1950	1960	1970	1980	1990	2000
6,176	8,392	19,545	54,507	78,549	85,015
Department of Statistics of Andorra

== Modern day ==
Andorra is not a member of the International Labour Organization and ICTUR reports that the Constitution of Andorra recognizes general trade union rights, but there is no legal protection against anti-union activities, nor is the right to strike explicitly confirmed.

== See also ==
Politics of Andorra

Human Rights in Andorra
