= New Orleans dock workers and unionization =

Union group

Dockworkers in New Orleans at the turn of the 20th century often coordinated their unionization efforts across racial lines. The nature of that coordination has led some scholars to conclude that the seeming interracial union activity was in fact biracial: a well-organized plan of parallel concerted activity with coordination and support between the groups, but with a clear divide along racial lines.

Under this framework, cooperation was seen less a matter of ideological interracial solidarity among the working class and more a matter of pragmatism so that the working conditions of each distinct group would improve.

As discussed below, several factors may have allowed biracial union efforts to succeed at the port of New Orleans, including (a) the independent strength of the black unions that compelled whites to enter into collaborative agreements with them; (b) the prior history of racial division or segmentation of labor; (c) the relative power of employers to control jobs; and (d) overall employment relations.

Because dock work was generally unskilled (with the notable exception of screwmen) and of a short-term contractual nature, an employer could readily replace workers who refused to bend to the employer's terms. Black laborers were both numerous and available for work. In this type of competitive market, blacks and whites were pitted against each other by ship owners in an effort to keep wages down: if whites would not work for a lower wage, owners would look to blacks who would. Following this reasoning, "[o]nly control of the labor supply and solidarity across trade and racial lines could reduce this possibility. That meant that alliances between unions and, most importantly, between black and white unions, were essential to reducing competition between different groups for jobs." Alliances between the groups allowed both to exercise more control over the terms and conditions of their work, including wage rates and production expectations. Union leaders of both races recognized the difference that an alliance made in those terms and conditions, prompting a pragmatic continuation of the biracial system.

== 50-50 or half-and-half ==
New Orleans dockworkers maintained a long-standing tradition known as "50-50" or "half-and-half." Under this arrangement, both black and white workers insisted that any work crew hired by ship owners be 50% black and 50% white. Workers would labor side by side, performing the same work for the same pay. This was generally seen as a way to prevent employers from undermining one group by playing to the other: both black and white union leaders recognizes that when blacks and whites were hired in alternating groups as they were in the mid-1890s, unions weakened and race riots or other tensions could – and did – flare up.

In October 1901 the separate black and white unions created a Dock and Cotton Council that overarched unions of black and white screwmen, longshoremen, teamsters, loaders, and other work classifications at the waterfront. Leadership positions on the council were generally divided according to the 50-50 system, with the presidency and financial secretary position held by white workers and the vice-presidency and corresponding secretary position held by black workers. Committee positions were similarly assigned. By 1903, the council oversaw eight separate unions of black and white dockworkers with a total of approximately 10,000 members and helped ensure that all unions adhered to the 50-50 rule. Over time, it also assisted the member unions in negotiations with employers and were kept informed of the unions' organizational and racial relationships. As the overarching union body, the council was also empowered to call for a general port strike.

== Limits on racial cooperation ==
Both black and white unions insisted that they had no interracial equality or ideological leanings. Black workers announced that they wanted a stable waterfront, not social equality with white men, and did not want to be used by employers to drive a wedge between the races. The structure and operation of the Dock and Cotton Council has also been seen as racially stratified by some scholars. Although black and whites were elected equally to officer positions and conference committees, and work operated under the 50-50 system, white workers consistently held the presidency and were the only ones allowed to hold foreman positions. Black workers vehemently protested their exclusion from foreman jobs, but faced resistance from white waterfront laborers who did not want to take orders from a black man. In order to preserve the overall alliance, black unions retreated from the foreman controversy.

== Screwmen ==
New Orleans screwmen were responsible for tightly compressing and packing cotton bales into the holds of ships. This critical task put them at the top of the labor force on the docks and allowed them to insist on the highest wages; their work was highly skilled, required immense strength, and was indispensable to the smooth operation of the waterfront. However, in contrast to other waterfront laborers, white screwmen had resisted cooperation with their black counterparts. In the 1880s, the white screwmen refused the 50-50 arrangements and voted for a quota system that allowed only 20 black screwmen crews per day. Another account put the limit at 100 black screwmen at any one time. The locals had separate contracts with different terms, and there was no way to support workers in labor disputes. In addition, rumors began to spread that shipping agents were trying to find ways to remove the 75-bale per day limit instituted by white screwmen by using black screwmen who would work for lower wages with no limit on bales stowed. A black shipping company also emerged. Such types of racial divisions led to riots in the mid-1890s as black screwmen attacked their white counterparts, whites responded with equal violence, and numerous deaths resulted.

By the turn of the twentieth century, however, screwmen of both races faced new pressures and demands from employers with the advent of new shipping technologies, larger ship size, and the shippers' search for non-union labor. Now, "speed, not skill, was central to profitability." In part as a response to the high wages that screwmen commanded (regardless of how many bales were stowed) and the results of cooperation between black and white workers overall on the waterfront, employers introduced a new system of loading known as 'shoot-the-chute.' This system required crews of 4 to 5 men to throw down between 400 and 700 bales or more of cotton per day into the holds of the ships where other workers waited to pack them. Moreover, in contrast to earlier years, no limit was placed on the number of bales required to constitute a day's work – men would work until told to stop, not until they reached a set number of bales. There was also concern that the faster pace would mean that there would be less work left for subsequent days, leaving workers idle (and unpaid).

The definition of a fair day's work was central to the dispute, and in April 1902 the employers' Steamship Conference declared that (1) the employer had the right to direct where employees work; (2) that the employer's orders must be obeyed, even if the employer's agent was not a union member; (3) only Conference members could determine the "character of the stowage of the cotton"; and (4) the employer had the right to expect as much work as could reasonably be done.

Both black and white screwmen fiercely resisted shoot-the-chute and the lower working conditions it represented for them, as well as the Conference's view of a day's work. In order to effectively stand against their employers, the two screwmen unions agreed to a uniform wage scale in April 1902. This contract also provided for equal work distribution among black and white screwmen, but forbade them from engaging in sympathy strikes or striking for higher wages. As scholar Eric Arnesen analyzed the situation, "white workers reasoned accurately that success lay in reducing all possible divisions between black and white workers and preventing a revival of a split labor market on the docks." Black screwmen found a somewhat different reason for joining with their white counterparts, namely, a sense that they were being unfairly used by owners as a way to attack the white workers and starve them out of work – and being paid lower wages in the process.

In the fall of 1902, the black and white screwmen unions agreed that they would present all demands to employers jointly, renew the 50-50 work-sharing agreement from the spring, and maintain mixed-race work crews. Embracing 50-50 even further, they insisted that they would not recognize a foreman who was not a member of either the black or white screwmen's union. Moreover, 100 to 120 bales of cotton would be a day's work – not the 400 and 700 demanded under shoot-the-chute.

The screwmen's alliance was deemed generally successful and firmly adhered to by both black and white unions. From 1902 through 1903, they launched a series of strikes (and responding lockouts from employers) that ended in the realization of their production rate and 50-50 demands. Notably, the screwmen enjoyed the backing of other waterfront unions – both black and white – and the newly formed Dock and Cotton Council. The first strike began on November 3, 1902, when screwmen struck all employers who did not adhere to the new joint contract demands. Despite the fact that employers accused black unions of breaking the terms in their earlier separate contract and threatened them, the strike remained united and ended in early December 1902; by December 25, screwmen were packing on average 110 bales per day.

In response to the screwmen's success, employers instituted two lockouts in 1903, again centering on the shoot-the-chute system and the required number of bales that screwmen would have to stow. In April, employers demanded no limits on the number of bales stowed, the end of 50-50, restoration of shoot-the-chute, and a restoration of the power to give work assignments. When both black and white workers refused and described the demand as "so objectionable and so inimical" that they could not accept, they were locked out for approximately three weeks. Negotiations continued through the spring and summer, with employers agreeing on 50-50 but insisting on the higher pace and threatening to move work elsewhere. Although rumors of a split between the black and white unions surfaced, no break actually occurred. With no contract by September and no definition of a fair day's work, workers worked at their own pace and, again, the black and white unions affirmed their cooperation.

The screwmen were again locked out on October 1, 1903, this time supported by black and white longshoremen. Shippers filed several lawsuits and restraining orders against the screwmen, and city leaders (including Mayor Paul Capdevielle) unsuccessfully attempted to mediate. Scholar Daniel Rosenberg noted that even imported strikebreakers sometimes quit when they learned of the lockout and both protests and violence rapidly broke out. Ultimately, the two-week lockout ended when employers proposed terms requiring screwmen to produce 160 hand-stowed bales per day. After intense debate in a joint meeting of the black and white screwmen, the proposal was accepted and the shipping lines admitted defeat. Shippers experienced more than $400,000 in losses while screwmen lost $50,000 in wages and prevented any bales of cotton from leaving the port of New Orleans between October 1 and October 10, 1903.

== The 1907 general levee strike ==
1907 general levee strike
- Part of Labor Unions
- Date: October 5–25, 1907 (118 years ago)
- Location: New Orleans
- Caused by: Increase of loading quota from 160 bales to +200 bales per day
- Result: 187 bales per day settlement

Parties
Dockworkers	Dock Companies

Number
+8,000	

In the autumn of 1907, both black and white longshore workers launched an extended general strike against their shipping company employers. As in 1902–03, screwmen were the focus of the initial conflict, which one scholar identifies as resentment on the part of shippers and steamship agents that the screwmen (and other dockworkers) had nearly seized complete control over their terms of work and won the 160-per-day bale limit. When the 1903 contract expired on September 1, 1907, employers employed a 'parity' argument, demanding that New Orleans screwmen stow as much cotton as their counterparts in Galveston, Texas – a rate which employers initially claimed to be 200 bales per day but quickly escalated to what scholars peg at 240, or even 300 bales per day. On October 4, all of the shipping lines locked out the screwmen, black and white alike. Pursuant to a call from the Dock and Cotton Council, 9,000 dockworkers, black and white, struck the New Orleans port that evening in a show of solidarity with the screwmen. Freight handlers from the Southern Pacific line also struck, ending any work on the port. Individual black and white waterfront unions reinforced the council's message, asking their members to stay away from the ports, insisting that they would hold firm across racial lines, and noting that if the employers played one racial group against the other, they would all face starvation wages.

Employers responded by immediately bringing in thousands of black and white strikebreakers. During the first week of the strike, the breakers unloaded freight trains and stowed cotton. Although some crews worked at a 200 bale per day rate, they could not keep up that rate and were considered by some to be less efficient than expected. Some of the replacements quit when they learned they were being used as strikebreakers, and others quit in response to the protests of the New Orleans waterfront workers. The families of dockworkers also confronted strikebreakers, as did some members of the strikebreakers' own families who felt solidarity with the dockworkers. Yet the New Orleans strikers remained generally peaceful.

During the second week of the strike, employers launched strong attempts to create a racial break among the black and white strikers. Some employers began calling for an end to the screwman trade altogether (to be replaced by general dock labor); a combination of events that led some observers to conclude that the employers' goal was not to reach settlement but rather to destroy the screwmen's union. They also appealed to the non-screwmen, noting that they were losing wages over a battle that was not their own. Shippers also revived the White League, a group designed to intimidate black strikers. Despite the attempts, strikers remained united.

On October 11, black and white screwmen proposed a return to work at the rate of 160 bales per day, pending an investigation into port charges and conditions. The New Orleans mayor endorsed this proposal, but employers refused and insisted on the 200 bale per day rate. In turn, the screwmen rejected the employers' demand and held to the 160 bale rate. During this process, rumors began to spread claiming that the black and white screwmen had begun to splinter, as had the unity between the screwmen and the other waterfront job classification; however, no split materialized. Instead, the union agreed that it would accept the mayor's proposal of 180 bales per day on the condition that this rate stand as a final settlement, pending no further action or investigation. This was rejected by management, and prompted claims in the newspapers that the workers were inflexible.

The general strike ended on October 24, 1907, with a compromise plan endorsed and urged by the city's mayor, who was under pressure due to ongoing financial losses resulting from the disruption of work. Under the proposal, screwmen would agree to return to work at the rate of 180 bales per day pending binding arbitration of their conflict; shipping agents reluctantly agreed as well. In response to union demands, the agreement also included provisions for an investigation into the port's viability and conditions based on workers' allegations that they were unfairly being blamed for general economic and trade problems. Racial divisions quickly formed as the screwmen appointed their representatives to the investigatory committee along the 50-50 principle – and white ship owners refused to work with the black representatives. After no resolution could be reached, the mayor and Louisiana governor Newton C. Blanchard instructed the state assembly to form a five-person committee to investigate all charges and regulations affecting the New Orleans port, including labor and related elements. This committee began work in January 1908 and continued through mid-May of the same year. A particular focus was the nature of cross-racial action; they viewed the screwmen's 50-50 rule as undesirable, particularly as it risked fostering what they considered inappropriate social equality. White supremacy rhetoric also existed, but although the commission called for an end to cross-racial cooperation, the workers ignored the instructions and the commission could not enforce their position. Ultimately, the commissioners concluded that labor was not overpaid and worked under the same conditions as their counterparts in other locations. On the question of bale-rate, it ruled that 187 bales of loose cotton per work crew would constitute a day's work.

== See also ==
- 1892 New Orleans general strike
- 1895 New Orleans dockworkers massacre
- Labor history of the United States
- Labour movement and racial equality
- Colored National Labor Union

== Sources ==
- Eric Arnesen, "Biracial Waterfront Unionism" in Waterfront Workers, ed. Calvin Winslow, (University of Illinois Press: 1998).
- Bernard Cook, "The Use of Race to Control the Labor Market in Louisiana" in Racism and the Labour Market: Historical Studies, eds. Marcel van der Linden and Jan Lucassen, (Peter Lang: 1995).
- Eric Arnesen, "It Ain't Like They Do in New Orleans: Race Relations, Labour Markets, and Waterfront Labor Movements in the American South, 1880-1923" in Racism and the Labour Market: Historical Studies, eds. Marcel van der Linden and Jan Lucassen, (Peter Lang: 1995).
- Rick Halpern, "Organized Labor, Black Workers, and the Twentieth Century South: The Emerging Revision" in Race and Class in the American South since 1890, eds. Melvyn Stokes and Rick Halpern (Berg: 1994).
- Eric Arnesen (1987) "To rule or ruin: New Orleans dock workers' struggle for control 1902–1903," Labor History, 28:2, 139–166.
- Arnesen, Eric, Waterfront Workers of New Orleans: Race, Class, and Politics Oxford University Press, New York (1991).
- Rosenberg, Daniel, New Orleans Dockworkers: Race, Labor, and Unionism 1892-1923 SUNY Press, Albany (1988).
