= 1978 Andorran political reform referendum =

A referendum on political reforms was held in Andorra on 16 January 1978. Voters were presented with two options, but the none of the above option received the most votes.

== Background ==
In February 1977 the General Council and the Co-Princes agreed to political reforms, putting forward six options to voters in a referendum in October 1977. However, none of the options received a majority of the vote, and 30% of votes cast were left blank.

A second referendum was planned with voters offered a choice between the proposal that received the most votes in the 1977 referendum, and a new proposal. Proposal 6 had received the most votes in the 1977 referendum, and had been put forward by the Democratic Agrupament d'Andorra. They proposed having the General Council elected by proportional representation with regional lists, together with a directly elected prime minister. The prime minister would then appoint a deputy and four ministers. The General Council put forward a new Proposal 7, which would increase the number of parishes from 6 to 7. Each parish would elect four members to the General Council and the Prime Minister would be directly elected.

== Results ==
Choice	Votes	%
Proposal 6	647	31.55
Proposal 7	673	32.81
None of the above	731	35.64
Total	2,051	100.00
Valid votes	2,051	97.34
Invalid/blank votes	56	2.66
Total votes	2,107	100.00
Registered voters/turnout	3,235	65.13
Source: Direct Democracy
