= Trade unions in Nauru =

Trade unions in Nauru do not have a significant presence or formal structure. While there are organizations that offer some support to workers in specific sectors, these are not legally recognized as trade unions. A primary reason for this is Nauru's small population and limited private-sector employment opportunities.

== Trade union rights ==
The Constitution of Nauru provides for the general right to form associations, including trade unions. However, the 2020 Registration of Associations Act—which formalized rights for certain civil organizations—specifically excluded trade unions from official recognition.

Employers in Nauru may dismiss workers for participating in union activity, although those affected can file a civil complaint. The right to strike is neither explicitly protected nor banned. Nevertheless, civil servants—who make up a significant portion of the national workforce—may face legal prosecution and dismissal for engaging in strikes or organizing such activities.

While collective bargaining is not outlawed, it is not legally protected, and there is no established practice of collective negotiation between employers and workers in Nauru. Historical attempts to create formal trade unions have reportedly met with government resistance.

== Worker affiliation ==
Unlike in some countries, political parties in Nauru do not engage in promoting organized labor, due in part to the weak development of a formal party system.

Nauru is not a member of the International Labour Organization (ILO).

== Foreign workers ==
A large proportion of workers in Nauru are foreign nationals, including a notable number from Tuvalu. The prevalence of foreign labor, combined with the country's economic instability, further inhibits the development of organized labor. Reports have highlighted that some foreign workers have faced delayed wages or back pay. In general, the rights of expatriate workers appear to be a lower political priority within Nauru.
