= 1895 New Orleans dockworkers massacre =

Labor riot in Louisiana

The 1895 New Orleans dockworkers massacre was an attack against black, non-union dockworkers by unionized white workers on March 11 and 12, 1895. The mob killed six black workers. The incident had its roots in both economic pressure and racial hatred. The riot marked the end of fifteen years of racially unified unions in New Orleans, for example in the successful 1892 New Orleans general strike just three years before.

In the economic slowdown following the Panic of 1893, the Harrison Line of Liverpool led a number of other shippers in announcing, in February 1895, that they were letting 300 organized white workers go, and replacing them with unskilled non-union black workers. Union workers had just displayed racial unity in the general strike, even in the face of provocations and harassment from the strongly anti-union New Orleans Times-Democrat, for one example.

But this time, under pressure, a "race to the bottom" bidding war between white and black groups developed into violence. Gangs of white screwmen and longshoremen began organized assaults in March. On the 11th, a black dock worker named Philip Fisher was wounded by gunfire. The next dawn, a mob of several hundred whites descended on an ocean-going ship being loaded and started firing on black longshoremen. Between this site and a coordinated attack on another cotton vessel upriver, six were killed.

The men killed in the massacre were Henry James, Jules Calise Carrebe, Leonard Mallard, William Campbell and two unknown men.

Governor Murphy J. Foster called in the state militia to reinstate order.

Despite continuing tensions and the race riot of 1900, in the 20th century New Orleans black and white dockworkers would implement racially cooperative work rules, for example, 50/50 representation on jobs.

== See also ==
- List of incidents of civil unrest in the United States
- 1892 New Orleans general strike
