= Depiction of Italian immigrants in the media during Prohibition =

Italian Immigrants in Prohibition media refers to the public perception of Italian Americans from 1920 to 1933, when the Eighteenth Amendment was in force. Anti-Italian sentiment was prevalent in the United States before Prohibition, as seen in the 1891 New Orleans Lynchings. The rise in popularity of feature films led to an increase in the exposure of Italian stereotypes. The image of the Italian gangster was promoted by such films as Little Caesar (1931) and Scarface (1932). These films were associated with bootlegging and organized crime that was seen as on the rise during Prohibition.

Many academics believe that the portrayal of Italian Americans in media and film has damaged their image in the public eye. Stereotypes surrounding the love of food, family honor, possessing certain political opinions, and propensity to commit crime were portrayed often in film, newspapers, and other forms of media. According to scholars, these stereotypes continue to be associated with Italian Americans, due in part to the coverage of these stereotypes during the Prohibition Era.

== Formation of Stereotypes ==
=== The Mafia ===
Beginning in the 1880s, Italian immigrants began arriving in the United States, mostly in the Mid-Atlantic region. From 1880 to 1915, almost 15 million Italians would immigrate to the United States, the largest mass migration in modern history. Many immigrants came from the troubled island of Sicily, where crime and disorder were rampant. The large-scale immigration of Italians to North America brought elements of the Sicilian Mafia. While these criminal elements were ultimately a minority within the large Italian immigrant community, the influence of yellow journalism tied Italian immigrants with criminality.

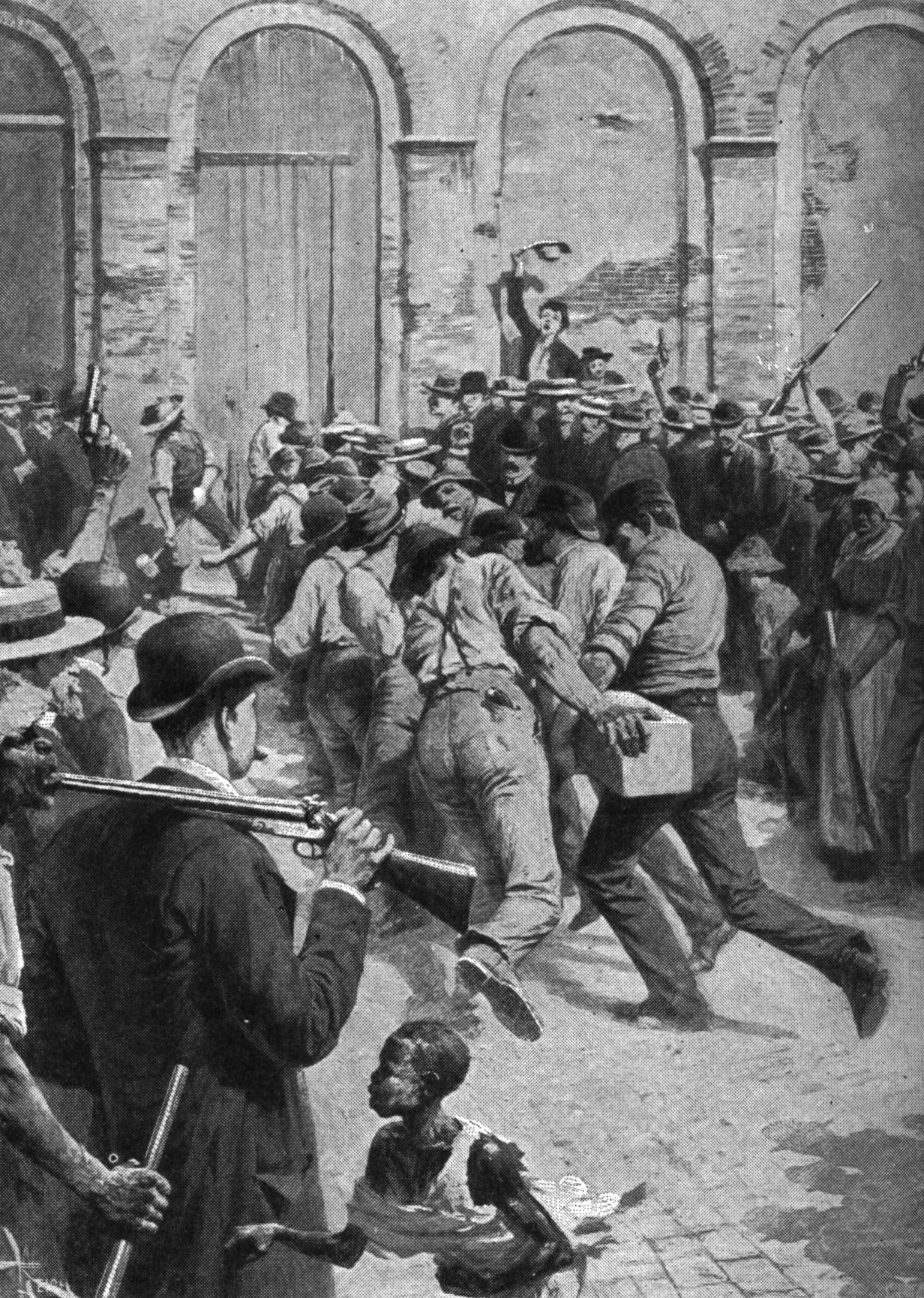
The lynching of 11 Italian Americans, suspected of Mafia connections, in New Orleans, 1891.

Organized crime in the United States is referred to as La Cosa Nostra (Italian for "our thing"). Traditions of organized crime in the United States trace their roots to similar organizations in Sicily and southern Italy during the late 19th century. As Italian Americans normally lived in ethnic neighborhoods, often known as "Little Italy," many traditions and customs from Italy continued over generations. Anti-Italian sentiment was linked to the Mafia, as in the infamous lynchings of 11 Italian Americans in New Orleans on March 14, 1891. Accused of murdering a New Orleans police chief, the suspected Mafia soldiers were assaulted and lynched while in prison awaiting sentencing. The news coverage from the event helped publicize the term "Mafia" in the United States, and from 1891 on, Italian Americans would be associated with the Mafia in the media.

=== Anarchism ===
Militant anarchism was considered a significant danger to the United States in the late 19th century and early 20th century. Although the anarchist who assassinated President William McKinley in 1901 was Polish, anarchism was often associated with Italian immigrants and Italian Americans. Italian anarchists were generally immigrants, fueling the anti immigrant feelings of many Americans. Italian American anarchist Luigi Galleani was responsible for multiple assassination attempts on powerful American figures during the Prohibition Era. However, by the 1930s, the association of Italian immigrants with anarchists faded as militant activities became less frequent.

=== The Sacco and Vanzetti Case ===
On July 14, 1921, known Italian anarchists Nicola Sacco and Bartolomeo Vanzetti were tried and convicted for the 1920 murder of two people during an armed robbery. The two Italian immigrants were convicted based on circumstantial evidence, and there were allegations of anti-Italianism among the jury and the presiding judge. Multiple appeals for clemency were denied, and on August 23, 1927, were executed by electric chair, along with the confessed culprit to the crime, Celestino Medeiros. The case of Sacco and Vanzetti is considered an example of anti-Italianism, including prejudice because of their anarchist political beliefs. The press reported extensively on the case, and reports were given of the anti-Italian bias of Judge Thayer. Later newspaper reports were almost entirely silent on the Medeiros confession.

The Sacco and Vanzetti Case is considered a miscarriage of justice, in that the defendants were found guilty over circumstantial evidence, and that the jury held strong biases against the defendants. Many Italian Americans resented the decision and felt that the media unfairly. portrayed them as violent criminals.

=== Papism and anti-Catholicism ===
The majority of Italian immigrants to the United States were Catholic, and subject to widespread anti-Catholic discrimination. Nativist movements in the United States in the 1840s opposed Irish immigration mainly on religious grounds, as Nativists were overwhelmingly Protestant. Anti-Catholic movements, notably the Ku-Klux-Klan, opposed Catholics out of fear of papal political control in the United States. Catholics in the United States were often referred to as "Papists," a term which connoted political allegiance to the Pope first, and the United States second. Anti-Catholicism did not factor in the Sacco and Vanzetti Case, as the two defendants were self-professed atheists.

== Depictions of Italian Americans by the Media ==
=== Film ===
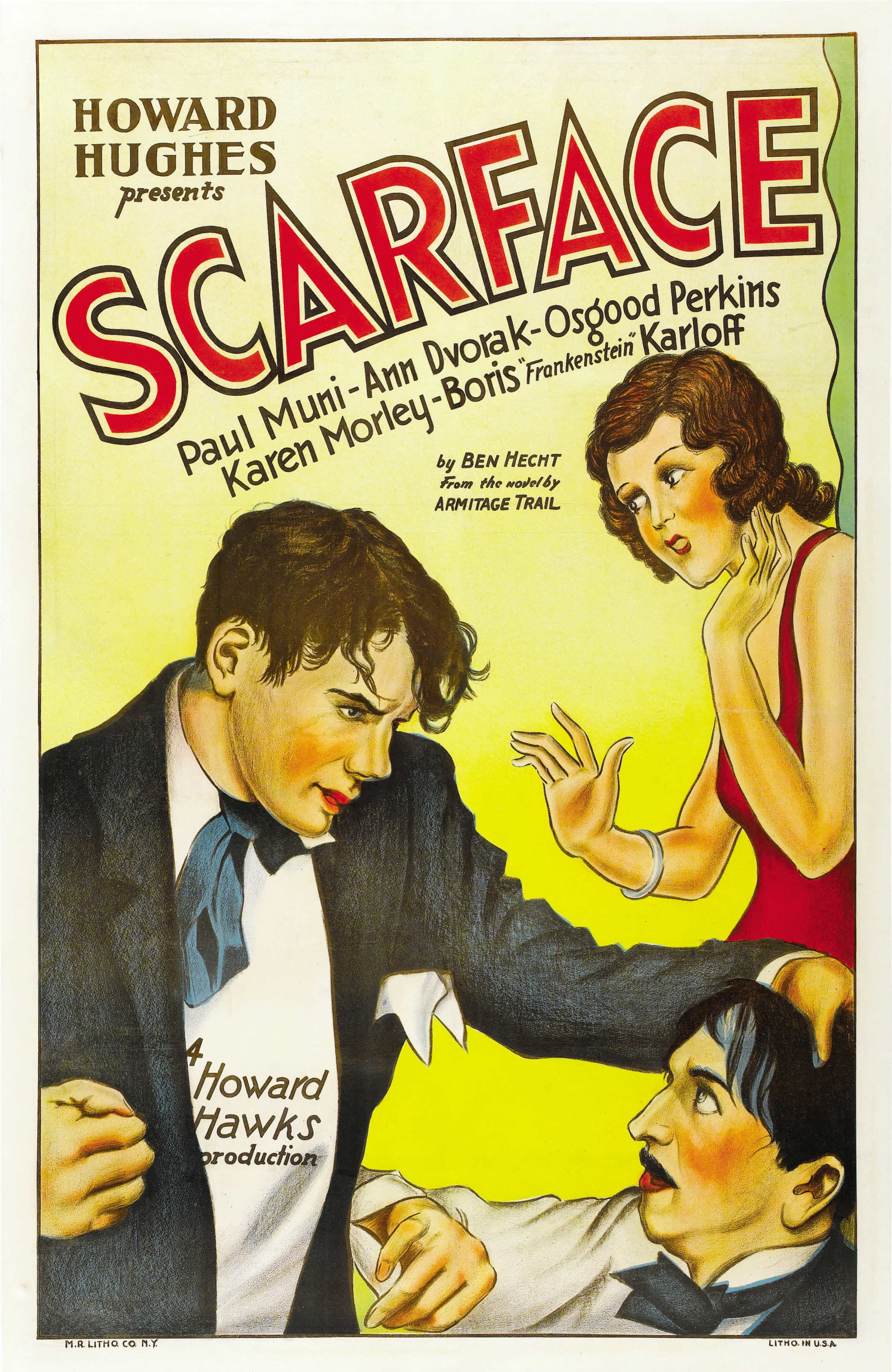
Scarface (1932) was a film based on the life of Al Capone and shows how Italian Americans were seen in popular cinema.

The Prohibition Era, during which the sale of liquor was banned in the United States, is often identified with the rise of bootlegging and organized crime. Hollywood movies depicting the Mafia became extremely popular during this period, from around 1920 to 1933. Films such as Little Caesar (1931) Scarface (1932) and featured Italian American characters and relied on common stereotypes of Italians, especially connections with the Mafia and organized crime. In particular, the film Little Caesar was based on the real life exploits of Chicago gangster Al Capone. The films are generally remembered as important contributions to the gangster film genre, and would go on to inspire later gangster films about Italian Americans, especially The Godfather (1972), GoodFellas (1990), and Casino (1995).

=== Print Media ===
Print media was an important proving ground with regard to the question of Italian American identity. Newspapers publicized and sensationalized stories of crimes committed by Italian Americans causing issues of crime and race to be confused in public opinion. This confusion was fueled by strong xenophobic sentiments, sensationalized by publications like William Randolph Hearst’s New York Journal and magazines such as Puck. These publications also featured illustrations depicting the wave of immigration as the arrival of refuse and undesirables from other counties. These illustrations fueled anti-Italian sentiment among the American public.

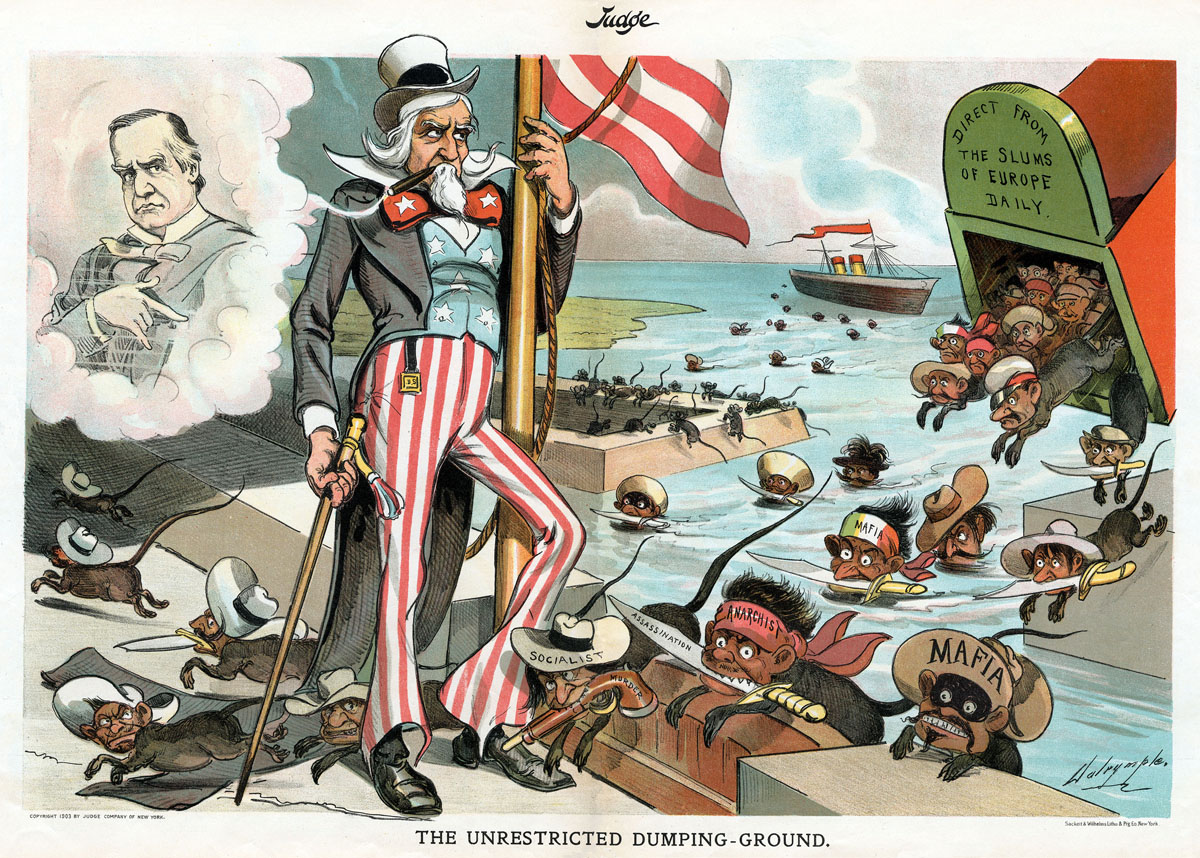
This political cartoon published in the magazine Judge in 1903 is an early example of anti-Italian sentiment in print media.

Early anti-Italian publications insisted that Italian immigrants were incapable of being integrated to American culture or adopting American values. This wholesale rejection of Italian immigrants would cement the formation of stereotypes associating Italian immigrants with the criminal activities perpetrated by a minority segment of the population.

While popular print media would depict Italian Americans as inseparably connected to crime, socialism, and anarchy, the Italian American press worked to change the narrative. Italian language print media celebrated the work of Giuseppe Petrosino, who was the only Italian American detective with the NYPD, and popularized the archetype of the Italian detective. These stories were published by Italian American writers to push back against the stereotypes that tied them with the criminal minority and emphasize their ability to adopt the values of their new home.

Despite these efforts to demonstrate integration with their new home, Italian American immigrants often walked a fine line between assimilation in their new home. The Italian poet and author Pascal D’Angelo wrote realist poems and stories depicting the life of the Italian immigrant in America. These writings did more than gain popularity among the Italian population, in 1922 Carl Van Doren, discovered D’Angelo's writings and started publishing his works. D’Angelo's newfound success would lead up to the publication of his autobiography A Son of Italy in 1924. Other Italian writers would follow in the footsteps of D’Angelo including Constantine Panunzio and Emanuel Carnevali whose writings would contain similar themes to D’Angelo's use of realism to depict the lives of Italian immigrants.
