= 1977 Andorran political reform referendum =

A referendum on political reforms was held in Andorra on 28 October 1977. Voters were presented with six options, but none received a majority and over 30% of votes cast were left blank. A second referendum on political reform was held the following year.

== Background ==
In February 1977, the General Council and the Co-Princes agreed to political reforms, putting forward six options to voters:

Proposal	Proposed by	Details
1	General Council	Prime Minister elected by the General Council; Prime Minister appoints Deputy Prime Minister and four Ministers; Motions of no confidence possible
2	General Council	Prime Minister directly elected; Prime Minister appoints Deputy Prime Minister and four Ministers; Motions of no confidence results in fresh elections; Each parish to have 8 seats in the General Council
3	General Council	16 Council members elected nationally and two by each parish; Bicameral Council elects six-member government; Motions of no confidence results in fresh elections
4	Comú de la Massana	Increase number of parishes from six to seven; Each parish to have 4 seats in the Council; Parishes guaranteed seats in government; Motions of no confidence results in fresh elections
5	Quart de Les Escaldes	Increase number of parishes from six to seven; Each parish to have 4 seats in the Council; Prime Minister directly elected; Parishes not guaranteed seats in government; Motions of no confidence results in fresh elections
6	Democratic Agrupament d'Andorra	General Council elected by proportional representation with regional lists; Prime Minister directly elected; Prime Minister appoints Deputy Prime Minister and four Ministers; Parishes not guaranteed seats in government

== Results ==
Choice	Votes	%
Proposal 1	28	1.46
Proposal 2	41	2.14
Proposal 3	13	0.68
Proposal 4	173	9.04
Proposal 5	393	20.54
Proposal 6	668	34.92
None of the above	597	31.21
Total	1,913	100.00
Valid votes	1,913	98.76
Invalid/blank votes	24	1.24
Total votes	1,937	100.00
Registered voters/turnout	3,206	60.42
Source: Direct Democracy
