= Vieux Carre Property Owners, Residents and Associates =

- Vieux Carre Historic District
- U.S. National Register of Historic Places
- U.S. Historic district
- Location within East New Orleans Location within Louisiana Location within the United States
- Location: Bounded by the Mississippi River, Rampart and Canal Sts., and Esplanade Ave., New Orleans, Louisiana
- Coordinates: 29°57′26″N 90°3′50″W
- Built: 1734
- Architect: Multiple
- NRHP reference No.: 66000377
- Added to NRHP: October 15, 1966

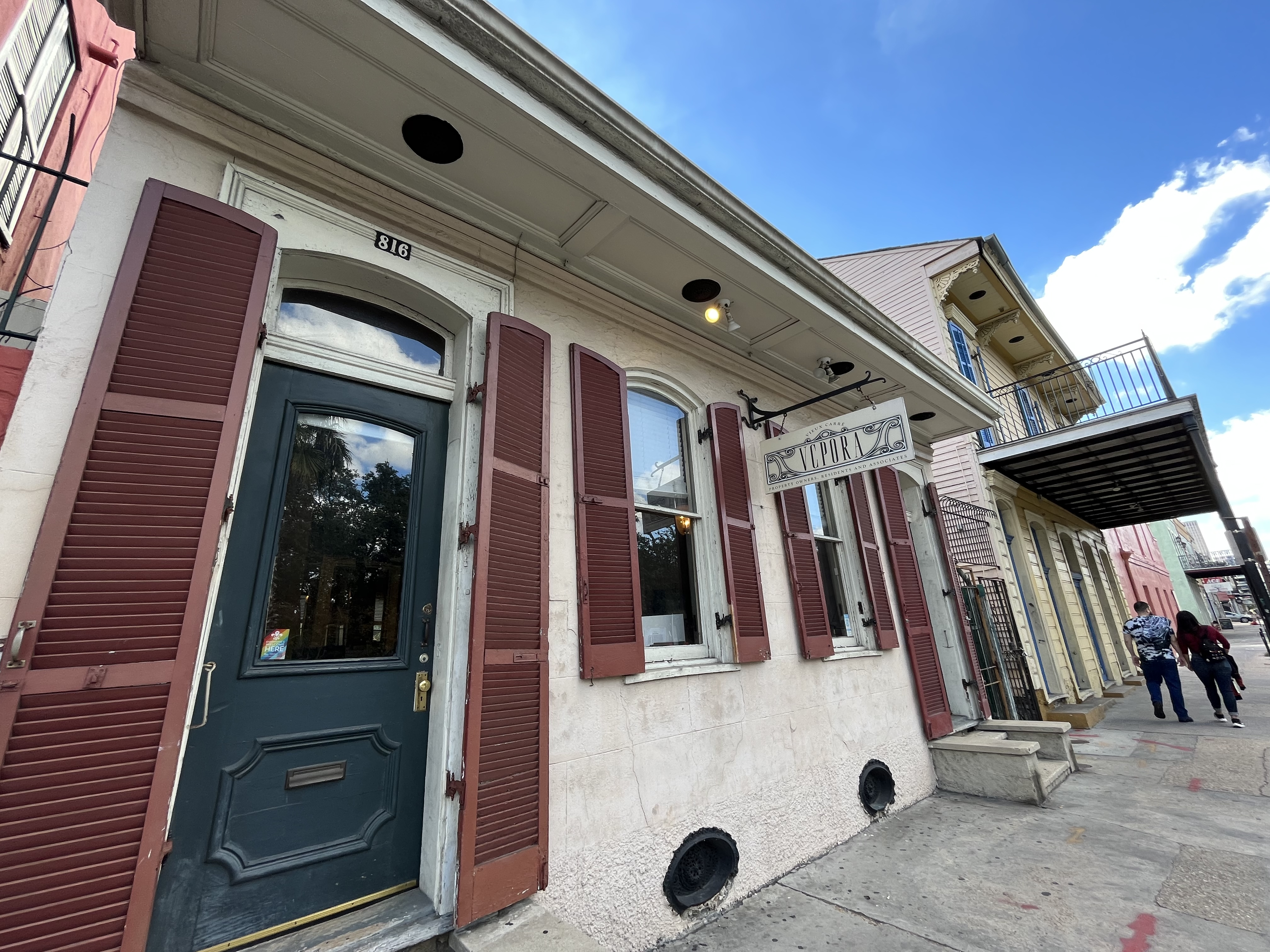
Organization headquarters

Vieux Carré Property Owners, Residents, and Associates (VCPORA), organized in the 1920s, is a pioneer organization in the historic preservation movement that grew out of several grass roots efforts to protect the 200-year-old Vieux Carré from decay and demolition. In 1936 the Louisiana state legislature passed a constitutional amendment authorizing the historic preservation of the Vieux Carré. Two years later on June 8, 1938 the neighborhood organization incorporated as a non-profit dedicated to the preservation, restoration, beautification and general betterment of the Vieux Carré.

The Vieux Carré is commonly known as the New Orleans, Louisiana's French Quarter district and is the site of the French Colony established in 1718.

VCPORA's affiliate memberships include the National Trust for Historic Preservation, the Louisiana Landmarks Society, and the Preservation Resource Center of New Orleans

== See also ==
- Vieux Carré Riverfront Expressway
- Vieux Carre Historic District
