= Trade unions in Antigua and Barbuda =

- National organization(s): ABWU, ATLU
- Regulatory authority: Department of Labour

International Labour Organization
- Antigua and Barbuda is a member of the ILO

Convention ratification
- Freedom of Association: 2 February 1983
- Right to Organise: 2 February 1983

Trade unions in Antigua and Barbuda have a significant presence in the workforce, representing approximately 75% of Antigua and Barbuda's workers.

Trade unions operate freely, and the labour code recognizes the right to collective bargaining and strike action. However, many industries are classified as "essential services", and may be restricted from striking or subject to enforced mediation.
