= Alfred Braunthal =

Alfred Braunthal (10 February 1897 – 4 February 1980) was an Austrian trade unionist and social scientist.

Born in Vienna to a Jewish family, Alfred was the younger brother of Julius and Bertha Braunthal, who both later became prominent in the workers' movement. Alfred studied philosophy, history and economics in Vienna and Berlin, receiving a doctorate in 1920.

In 1921, he became working for the Leipziger Volkszeitung newspaper, writing about finance, and also teaching at the Tinz Heimvolkshochschule. From 1925 until 1928, he was the principal at this social democratic school. He also wrote about economics from a Marxist viewpoint, and from 1929 worked at the Research Center for Economic Policy.

When the Nazis came to power in Germany, Braunthal fled to Belgium, where he spent time as Hendrik de Man's assistant. In 1936, he emigrated to the United States, settling in New York City. There, he began as research director of the United Hatters, Cap and Millinery Workers International Union, his writing on economics becoming more concerned with immediate, practical matters, and becoming influenced by John Maynard Keynes. He was also active in the German Labour Delegation.

In 1949, Braunthal became the first head of the economic and social department of the International Confederation of Free Trade Unions, based in Brussels. From 1960, he also served as an assistant general secretary of the federation. He retired in 1968.

Trade union offices
| Preceded by Hans Gottfurcht | Assistant General Secretary of the International Confederation of Free Trade Unions; 1960–1968; With: Stefan Nędzyński (1961–1964); Herbert Tulatz (1961–1968); Morris Paladino (1967–1968) | Succeeded by Morris Paladino |
