= Woman of Tehuantepec =

Woman of Tehuantepec may refer to

- Woman of Tehuantepec (Modotti), a c. 1929 photograph by Tina Modotti
- Woman of Tehuantepec (sculpture), a 1935 fountain and sculpture by Donal Hord
