= Heribert Maier =

Austrian trade union leader (1932–2007)

Heribert Maier (7 February 1932 – 6 November 2007) was an Austrian trade union leader.

Born in Graz, Maier studied at the local gymnasium and then the University of Vienna, from which he obtained a doctorate in economics.

Maier began working for the Austrian Trade Union Federation in 1955, then in 1958 moved to Brussels to work for the International Confederation of Free Trade Unions (ICFTU). In 1972, he was appointed as assistant general secretary of the ICFTU, but he left the following year to become general secretary of the International Federation of Commercial, Clerical and Technical Employees (FIET).

As leader of FIET, Maier focused on recruiting unions and supporting workers' struggles in Latin America, Asia and Africa. He became a worker representative at the International Labour Organization (ILO), jointly drafting its Tripartite Declaration on Multinationals in 1977, and championing the Health and Safety in Mines Convention.

In 1989, Maier left FIET to become deputy director-general of the ILO. He retired in 1996, and was awarded the Grand Decoration of Honour in Silver with Star by the Austrian government. In retirement, he served on the Education International's Committee of Experts.

Trade union offices
Preceded by Morris Paladino	Assistant General Secretary of the International Confederation of Free Trade Unions; 1972–1973	Succeeded by John Vanderveken
Preceded by Erich Kissel	General Secretary of the International Federation of Commercial, Clerical and Technical Employees; 1973–1989	Succeeded by Philip Jennings
