= Eddy Laurijssen =

Belgian former trade union official (born 1945)

Eddy Laurijssen (born 22 September 1945) is a Belgian former trade union official.

Born in Merksem, Laurijssen studied at the Antwerp Higher School for Social Studies, and the Emile Vandervelde Foundation. He then began working for the Union of Clothing Workers and Kindred Trades in Belgium, and in 1964 moved to work for the International Confederation of Free Trade Unions (ICFTU).

In 1972, Laurijssen was placed in charge of the ICFTU's youth work. He set up a new youth committee, and was elected as its first secretary. From 1981, he was based in the ICFTU's Geneva office, later becoming director there, and in 1988 he was elected as secretary of the workers' group on the governing body of the International Labour Organization (ILO).

In 1993, Laurijssen was elected as the deputy general secretary of the ICFTU. He served until 2001, when he moved to work for the ILO as director of its Brussels office, retiring in 2008.

Since retirement, Eddy Laurijssen is Board Member of the prestigious think tank the European Institute for Asian Studies.

Trade union offices
Preceded by Enzo Friso	Deputy General Secretary of the International Confederation of Free Trade Unions; 1993–2001	Succeeded by Zé Olívio
