= Morris Paladino =

Morris Paladino (1920–1991) was an American labor movement official.

Paladino attended the College of the City of New York. In 1937, he joined Local 91 of the International Ladies Garment Workers Union. He soon became the representative of the local, and received a union scholarship to study economics at Harvard University. In 1958, he was appointed as assistant manager of Local 91, then in 1959 he was transferred to Local 25 on what was described as a "special assignment. In 1960 the AFL–CIO asked him to undertake a special assignment, travelling around Brazil.

In 1961, Paladino was appointed as Director of Education for the ICFTU Inter American Regional Organisation of Workers, then in 1962 he became its assistant general secretary and director of organization. In 1964, he moved to become deputy assistant director of the American Institute for Free Labor Development, with responsibility for planning and organization.

In 1967, Paladino was appointed as assistant general secretary of the International Confederation of Free Trade Unions (ICFTU), with the strong support of AFL–CIO President, George Meany. He was given charge of the Department of Organization, with responsibility for relationships with the international trade secretariats, vocational training and co-operative enterprises. In 1970, the AFL–CIO withdrew from the ICFTU, and Paladino resigned his post, instead becoming director of the Asian-American Free Labor Institute. He retired in 1985, and died in 1991.

Philip Agee alleged that Paladino worked as a Central Intelligence Agency agent while holding his labor movement posts.

Trade union offices
Preceded by Alfred Braunthal and Herbert Tulatz	Assistant General Secretary of the International Confederation of Free Trade Unions; 1967–1970; With: Alfred Braunthal and Herbert Tulatz (1967–1968)	Succeeded by Heribert Maier
