= Der Kuckuck =

Weekly political magazine in Austria (1927–1934)

- Editor-in-chief: Julius Braunthal
- Categories: Political magazine
- Frequency: Weekly
- Founder: Siegfried Weyr; Julius Braunthal
- Founded: 1929
- First issue: February 1929
- Final issue: 10 February 1934
- Country: Austria
- Based in: Vienna
- Language: German

Der Kuckuck (German: The Cuckoo) was a weekly leftist political magazine which was published in Vienna between 1929 and 1934. It was one of the publications affiliated with the Austrian Social Democratic Party (SDAP). The magazine is known for its use of high-quality photographs.

== History and profile ==
Der Kuckuck was established by Siegfried Weyr and Julius Braunthal, a member of the SDAP, in February 1929. Braunthal also edited the magazine. The inauguration of Der Kuckuck was announced in Der Kampf, another publication of the SDAP.

Der Kuckuck was headquartered in Vienna and came out weekly. The magazine had 16 pages and a format of 43x32 cm. The weekly targeted the working class readers to offer them an alternative instead of mainstream tabloid weeklies. It featured short illustrated articles on politics, art, culture, technology and sport. It also published serialized novels. Der Kuckuck covered articles on sports, but these articles were limited to the sporting activities of the working class.

Many Austrian and international photojournalists worked for Der Kuckuck such as Hans Popper, Nikolaus Schwarz, Edith Suschitzky, Rudolf Spiegel, Ferdinand Hodek, Willi Zwacek, Leo Ernst, Albert Hilscher, Lothar Rübelt, Bruno Völkel, Ernst Kleinberg, Tina Modotti, Paul Wolff, Willy Riethof, Hans Casparius, Martin Imboden and Edith Tudor-Hart. Over time the magazine became known for its photomontages and introduced the concept of worker’s photography. The editors regarded the worker's photography as a weapon of the workers' struggle. Der Kuckuck organized photographic contests among its readers to "reflect human life in all its manifestations."

Der Kuckuck was also distributed in Germany and had higher levels of readership. It was banned by the newly elected Nazi government in 1933. In Austria Der Kuckuck managed to sell 50,000 copies in its first year. However, its circulation began to decrease partly due to the decrease in the popularity of the SDAP. The circulation of Der Kuckuck was just 29,000 copies in 1932. Both the SDAP and its publications, including Der Kuckuck, were banned in February 1934. The last issue of the magazine appeared on 10 February 1934.

In 1995 Stefan Riesenfellner and Josef Seiter published a book on Der Kuckuck entitled Der Kuckuck. Die moderne Bildillustrierte des Roten Wien (German: Der Kuckuck. The modern picture magazine of Red Vienna).
