= Stefan Nędzyński =

Polish economist (1919–2008)

Stefan Nędzyński (1919 – 10 January 2008) was a Polish trade union official and economist.

Born in Poznań, Nędzyński was arrested by Soviet troops at the start of World War II, and spent three years in a labour camp. He was released in 1941, and served in the Polish Army, fighting in the Middle East and in Italy.

At the end of the war, instead of returning to Poland, Nędzyński moved to England, where he completed a doctorate at the University of London. He then began working for the Post Office Engineering Union, then in the early 1950s found work with the economics department of the International Confederation of Free Trade Unions (ICFTU). In 1958, he moved to work for the Postal, Telegraph and Telephone International, soon becoming its assistant general secretary. He returned to the ICFTU in 1961, directly recruited by its leader, Omer Becu, and made assistant general secretary with responsibility for organisation.

In 1964, Nędzyński returned to the PTTI, as its general secretary. When Becu retired from the ICFTU in 1967, Nędzyński was a leading candidate to replace him, but George Woodcock vetoed his candidacy, on the grounds that Nędzyński had already quit two jobs with the ICFTU.

Nędzyński remained with the PTTI until his retirement, in 1989. He then began representing Solidarity overseas.

Trade union offices
| Preceded by Alfred Braunthal | Assistant General Secretary of the International Confederation of Free Trade Unions; 1961–1964; With: Alfred Braunthal and Herbert Tulatz | Succeeded by Alfred Braunthal and Herbert Tulatz |
| Preceded by Fritz Gmür | General Secretary of the Postal, Telegraph and Telephone International; 1964–1989 | Succeeded by Philip Bowyer |
