= Herbert Tulatz =

German trade unionist (1914–1968)

- Born: 21 June 1914; Breslau, Poland
- Died: 28 June 1968 (aged 54)
- Occupation: trade unionist

Herbert A. Tulatz (21 June 1914 – 28 June 1968) was a German trade unionist and anti-Nazi activist.

Born in Breslau, Tulatz became a bank clerk, also joining the Social Democratic Party and becoming active in the trade union movement. He continued working for the movement after it was banned by the Nazis. In 1936, he was arrested by the Gestapo, and spent the next 3 1/2 years in prisons and labour camps. On release, he found work with a publishing house, but in 1942 was then conscripted into the 999th Light Afrika Division, a penal battalion. He was captured by the American forces in Tunisia in 1943 and spent 2 1/2 years as a prisoner-of-war. For much of this period, he was in Fort Devens with other anti-Nazi activists, and became the camp spokesman.

After World War II, Tulatz returned to publishing work, then began working for the German Trade Union Confederation. In 1952, he became the director of the confederation's trade union training college, in Oberursel. In 1959, he went to Nigeria, on a fact-finding mission for the International Labour Organization. In 1961, he began working for the International Confederation of Free Trade Unions, as its Assistant General Secretary, with responsibility for education. In 1967, he organised the first ICFTU World Congress on Education, in Montreal. He died, still in office, in 1968.

Trade union offices
Preceded by Alfred Braunthal	Assistant General Secretary of the International Confederation of Free Trade Unions; 1961–1968; With: Alfred Braunthal; Stefan Nędzyński (1961–1964); Morris Paladino (1967–1968)	Succeeded by Alfred Braunthal and Morris Paladino
