= Nude, 1925 (2) =

Photograph by Edward Weston

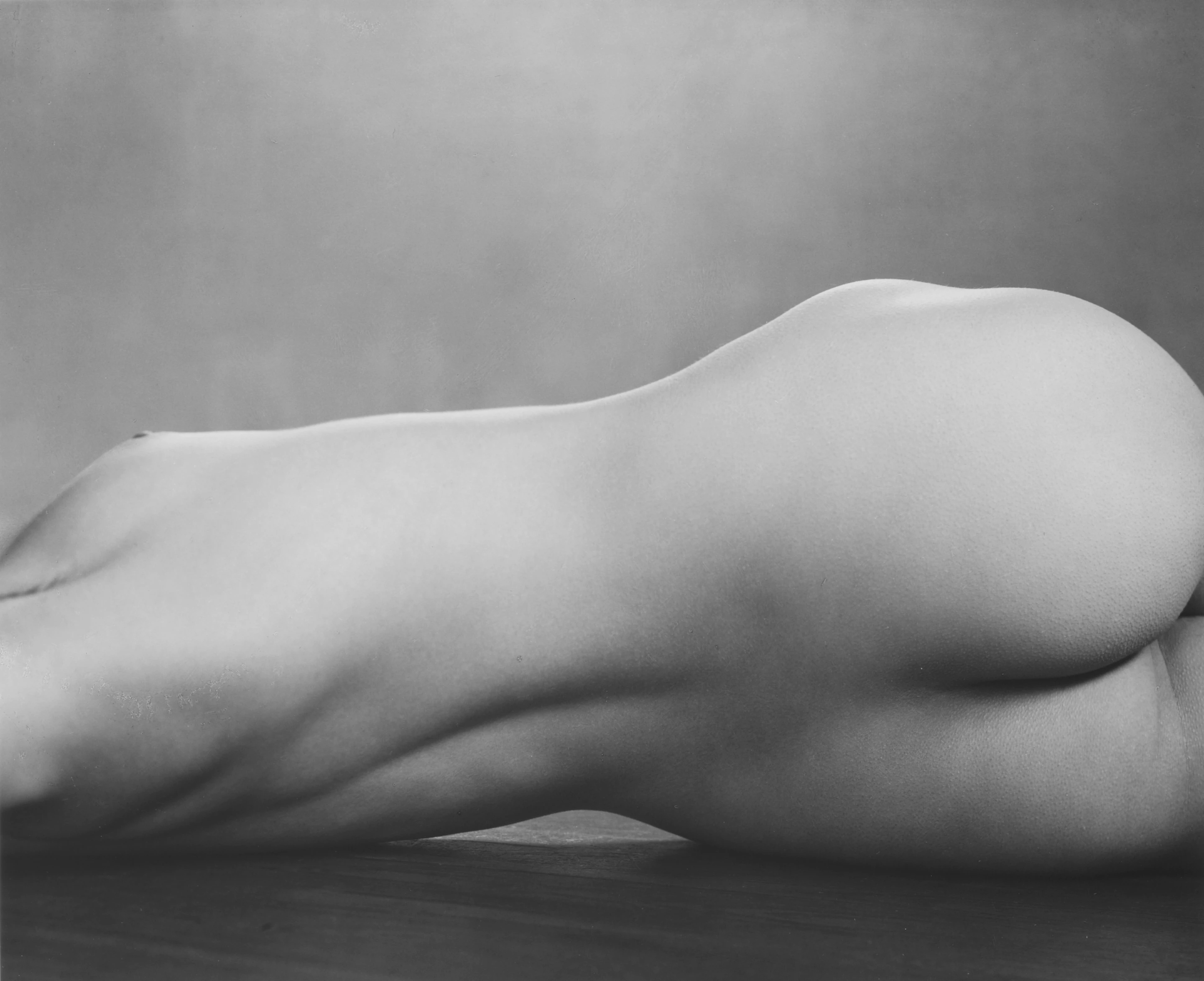
Edward Weston: Nude, 1925

Nude, 1925, also known as Torso, is a black and white photograph taken by American photographer Edward Weston in 1925. It is part of a series of six nude photographs of his model and lover, Miriam Lerner.

== History and description ==
Weston returned to California from Mexico after a three years residence, in 1925. The time spent in Mexico had a great influence on him, specially in the artistic, cultural and political fields, since he got to meet artists like Diego Rivera and Frida Kahlo, and had a relationship with the photographer Tina Modotti. He settled in California, and met Miriam Lerner, who soon became his model and lover. Weston admitted that after his return from Mexico, he found himself in "a new period in my approach and attitude towards photography". He took great inspiration from his relationship with Lerner, especially for a series of six nudes, the first important body of work that he made after his return to the United States. He mentioned how he was affected by "the full bloom of Miriam’s body — responsive and ever-stimulating".

His pictures are impressive and innovative because of their high degree of cropping. Weston chose to focus in the torso and hands of Lerner, unlike his previous work with a female model, Tina Modotti, also a fellow photographer, which consisted mostly of close-up portraits and often depicted her surroundings. Weston pictures of Lerner, by the contrary, focus in photographic croppings, bringing the viewer to a closer proximity with the model. In this case, the lighting and the twisted position of the nude torso gives it a sense of movement, and also a particular sculptural quality.

Weston decided to print this picture in palladium, and not in platinum, despite the fact that he used back then both mediums. By using palladium, he allowed not only for the depiction of a lustrous surface, but also for a bigger range of gray mid-tones.

== Art market ==
A print of this photograph, the only known to be in a private collection, was sold by $871,500 at Christie's, on April 6, 2017.

== Public collections ==
There are prints of this photograph at the J. Paul Getty Museum, in Los Angeles, at the Los Angeles County Museum of Art, and at the Special Collections at the University of California, Santa Cruz.
