= Ettehadiyeh-ye Sendika-ye Kargaran-e Iran =

ESKI
- Ettehadiyeh-ye Sendika-ye Kargaran-e Iran
- اتحادیه سندیکای کارگران ایران
- Merged into: Iranian Trade Union Congress
- Founded: September 1946
- Dissolved: 1951
- Location: Iran
- Members: 75,000 (claim, December 1947)
- Key people: Mehdi Sharif-Emami, Khosrow Hedayat
- Affiliations: ICFTU

Ettehadiyeh-ye Sendika-ye Kargaran-e Iran (Persian: اتحادیه سندیکای کارگران ایران, known by its acronym 'اسکی', ESKI) was a trade union centre in Iran. It was founded on the initiative of the Ministry of Labour and Propaganda in September 1946, with the explicit purpose of competing with the Tudeh-led Central United Council of the Trade Unions of Workers and Toilers of Iran (CUC). The task of setting up ESKI had been delegated to Mehdi Sharif-Emami, the director of the Dispute Settlement Department of the Ministry of Labour and Propaganda. ESKI published the newspaper Kargaran-e Iran. ESKI was a founding member of the International Confederation of Free Trade Unions.

== Profile ==
The Tudeh Party sharply criticized the launching of ESKI, denouncing it as a 'yellow union'.

In state companies, workers were obliged to join ESKI in order to keep their jobs. In other sectors, coercion and bribes were used to pressure workers to join ESKI. The strength of ESKI was concentrated in railway plants, munition factories and the tobacco industry.

However, ESKI had limited success. There was a distinct gap between official membership figures (as the largest union centre in terms of membership in the country at the time) and the number of genuine followers. ESKI leaders were generally not experienced labour organizers. In the analysis of the U.S. labour attaché, William J. Handley, ESKI was in the hands of government functionaries who, in Handley's view, were 'socially illiterate'.

On November 12, 1946, Tudeh mobilized a 24-hour general strike to condemn the murder of a railway worker. Tudeh accused ESKI of having hired thugs to carry out the assassination.

== Shift in leadership ==
When the Tudeh-led CUC was suppressed in May 1947, ESKI hoped to be able to fill the void, but such a breakthrough never occurred. ESKI was also caught up in the political intrigues between Ahmad Qavam's Democratic Party of Iran on the one hand and the royal court and army on the other. Sharif-Emami was removed as head of ESKI, and replaced by Khosrow Hedayat (Director-General of the State Railways Organization, and a court loyalist of aristocratic background).

== Cooperation with EMKA ==
On August 30, 1947, ESKI, EMKA (another trade union centre, formed through a split from ESKI in 1947) and another small union signed an agreement to coordinate their activities. CUC had refused to join the cooperation. However, the deal only lasted for two weeks, after which ESKI and EMKA excluded the third grouping. On October 28, 1947, ESKI and EMKA organized a labour congress in Teheran. Present were 84 ESKI delegates and 46 EMKA delegates. The cooperation between ESKI and EMKA did not last, however. And in December 1947, shortly after the break between the two centers, ESKI thugs carried out an attack on an EMKA club building. The attack on EMKA further discredited ESKI.

== Latter period ==
As of December 1947, ESKI claimed a membership of 75,000.

At the first congress of ESKI, held in November 1949, 21 out of 36 delegates were engineers. Only two delegates were workers.

At the labour congress held in February 1951, a new trade union centre called the Iranian Trade Union Congress was formed. Both ESKI and EMKA merged into the ITUC. ITUC inherited ESKI's ICFTU membership.
