= Zé Olívio =

José Olivio Miranda Oliveira (1947 – 10 December 2008), often known as Zé Olívio, was a Brazilian trade unionist.

Oliveira worked as a civil engineer, working for the Highway Consortium, and also became a professor at the Federal University of Bahia. In 1981, he was elected as president of the Union of Engineers of Bahia, and in 1983 he took this into the new Central Única dos Trabalhadores (CUT), the largest national trade union federation in the country. He became the first president of CUT in Bahia state, and also served on the federation's executive, with responsibility for education. He was a leading figure in uniting many engineers' trade unions into the Interstate Federation of Engineers' Unions (FISENGE).

From 1996, Oliveira served on the governing body of the International Labour Organization (ILO). In 2002, he was elected as the assistant general secretary of the International Confederation of Free Trade Unions, serving until 2006, when it merged into the new International Trade Union Confederation. He then became the ILO's co-ordinator of workers' activities in Latin America and the Caribbean.

Trade union offices
Preceded by Eddy Laurijssen	Assistant General Secretary of the International Confederation of Free Trade Unions; 2002–2006	Succeeded by Union merged
