= Hans Gottfurcht =

Hans Gottfurcht (7 February 1896 – 18 September 1982) was a German trade unionist and resistance member.

Born to a Jewish family in Berlin, Gottfurcht worked in the textile industry, joining a trade union when he was 17. In 1919, he began working full-time for the Central Association of Employees. In 1933, the Nazis closed the unions, and Gottfurcht became an insurance agent. This enabled him to create an illegal trade union organisation in Saxony, Thuringia and Silesia. He was arrested in 1937 and charged with treason, but was released due to a lack of evidence, and in 1938, he was able to emigrate to the United Kingdom.

In the UK, Gottfurcht joined the Labour Party and tried unsuccessfully to influence British government policy on Germany after the war. He also joined the Union of German Socialist Organisations in Great Britain. He was briefly interned in 1941, but on release set up an organisation of German trade unionists, and broadcast on the German language programmes of the BBC. He was able to help plan the future structure of German trade unions.

When the war ended, Gottfurcht returned to Germany, where he acted as a liaison officer for the British Trades Union Congress. In 1949, the International Confederation of Free Trade Unions (ICFTU) was established, and he was appointed to its secretariat, with responsibility for education. In 1952, he was elected as assistant general secretary of the ICFTU, serving until 1960, when he retired, due to poor health.

In retirement, Gottfurcht wrote a history of the international trade union movement. He died in 1982.

Trade union offices
Preceded by New position	Assistant General Secretary of the International Confederation of Free Trade Unions; 1952–1960	Succeeded by Alfred Braunthal
