= Central Union of Workers and Peasants of Iran =

- اتحادیه مرکزی کارگران و کشاورزان ایران
- Merged into: Iranian Trade Union Congress
- Founded: 1947
- Dissolved: 1951
- Location: Iran
- Members: 28,000 workers and 50,000 farmers and agricultural labourers

The Central Union of Workers and Peasants of Iran (Persian: اتحادیه مرکزی کارگران و کشاورزان ایران, abbreviated امکا, EMKA) was a central trade union organization in Iran. EMKA was founded in 1947, after a split from the government-sponsored ESKI. They attempted to work with other unions, such as ESKI, but soon their cooperation turned to open aggression and armed conflict. The EMKA survived for a few more years as an independent union before merging into the new Iranian Trade Union Congress in 1951.

== History ==
EMKA declared itself as an independent trade union centre, free from affiliations with any political party. EMKA was led by Ali-Asghar Noureddin Ashtiani.

EMKA claimed to represent around 28,000 workers and 50,000 farmers and agricultural labourers. Whilst the Labour Attaché at the British Embassy considered this claim as somewhat reliable, his American counterpart in Teheran considered that the numbers were highly inflated. According to the U.S. Labor Attaché, EMKA membership could not have exceeded 10,000.

On August 30, 1947, ESKI, EMKA and another small union signed an agreement to coordinate their activities. The Tudeh Party-led CUC had refused to join the cooperation. However, the deal only lasted for two weeks, after which ESKI and EMKA excluded the third grouping. On October 28, 1947, ESKI and EMKA organized a labour congress in Teheran. Present were 84 ESKI delegates and 46 EMKA delegates. The cooperation between ESKI and EMKA did not last, however. On December 14, 1947, shortly after the break between the two centers, ESKI thugs carried out an attack on an EMKA club building. EMKA was attacked as its leader Ashtiani was seen as pro-Qavam. The ESKI leader Khosrow Hedayat motivated, in a statement one year later, the attack by stating that the EMKA club was used for political activities in favour of the deposed prime minister Qavam.

On July 10, 1948, a coup took place within EMKA. Ashtiani and his close associate Dr. Afrashteh were expelled from the organization, accused of having tried to steer the organization into a political direction. The new leaders of the organization were Majid Mohiman (Manager of the state-owned Teheran Silos) and Amir Amirkeyvan. The Ministry of Labour supported the take-over by Mohiman.

At the labour congress held in February 1951, a new trade union centre called the Iranian Trade Union Congress was formed. Both ESKI and EMKA merged into the ITUC.

== Bibliography ==
Notes

References

- Floor, Willem (2003). "The Brickworkers of Khatunabad: A Striking Record (1953–1979)". International Review of Social History. 48 (3). Cambridge University Press: 427–455. doi:10.1017/S0020859003001147.
- Ladjevardi, Habib (1985). Labor Unions and Autocracy in Iran (1985 ed.). Contemporary issues in the Middle East. Syracuse, N.Y.: Syracuse University Press. ISBN 0-8156-2343-7. - Total pages: 328
