= Philip Jennings (trade unionist) =

Welsh trade union leader

Philip J. Jennings (born 24 March 1953) is a Welsh trade union leader.

Born in Cardiff, Jennings studied at Bristol Polytechnic and the London School of Economics. In 1976, he began working for the Banking, Insurance and Finance Union. In 1980, he became the secretary of the bank and insurance sections of International Federation of Commercial, Clerical, Professional and Technical Employees, also serving as secretary of its European Regional Organisation. In 1986, he additionally became the federation's executive secretary. In 1989, he was elected as general secretary of FIET. He took the federation into a merger which formed the UNI Global Union, and served as its general secretary until 2018.

In his union roles, Jennings was noted for his strong performance in media interviews, his support for the anti-apartheid movement, and his work on ethical supply chains. In 2019, he was elected as co-president of the International Peace Bureau.

Trade union offices
Preceded by Heribert Maier	General Secretary of the International Federation of Commercial, Clerical and Technical Employees; 1989–1999	Succeeded by Federation merged
Preceded by New position	General Secretary of the UNI Global Union; 2000–2018	Succeeded by Christy Hoffman
