= John Vanderveken =

Belgian former trade union leader (born 1930)

John Vanderveken (born 4 February 1930) is a Belgian former trade union leader.

== Life ==
Born in Antwerp, Vanderveken's family were involved in trade unionism, and were friendly with Omer Becu. They were also involved in the Belgian Resistance during World War II.

In 1951, Vanderveken began working for the International Confederation of Free Trade Unions (ICFTU), on the recommendation of Becu. From 1956, he took time out to study at Ghent University, also working for the American labour attaché.

Vanderveken returned to the ICFTU in 1960, working in the Economic and Social Policy Department, then in the organisation's Geneva office. He proved successful, and in 1974 won election as the confederation's assistant general secretary. In 1982, he was made acting general secretary of the ICFTU, and was elected to the post on a permanent basis in 1983. He retired in 1992, becoming an adviser to the Education International.

Trade union offices
| Preceded by Heribert Maier | Assistant General Secretary of the International Confederation of Free Trade Unions; 1974–1982 | Succeeded by Enzo Friso |
| Preceded by Otto Kersten | General Secretary of the International Confederation of Free Trade Unions; 1982–1992 | Succeeded by Enzo Friso |
