= Otto Kersten (trade unionist) =

German trade unionist

Otto Kersten (1928–1982) was a German trade union official.

Born in Altjessnitz, Kersten joined the Social Democratic Party of Germany (SPD) and a trade union in 1946. He then studied economics at the University of Rostock and in East Berlin. The SPD in East Germany was merged into the Socialist Unity Party of Germany, but Kersten remained part of a social democratic opposition group in the party. In 1953, he was sentenced to fifteen years hard labour for this activity, although he was released after three years. He then moved to Frankfurt in West Germany, and found work with the Bundesbank.

Kersten retained his interest in trade unionism, and in 1960 he began working for the European Trade Union Secretariat, then in 1965 moved to the German Trade Union Confederation, where he reorganised the international department. He became the secretary of the department, and also the chair of the confederation's International and European Committee. In 1972, he was elected as general secretary of the International Confederation of Free Trade Unions, serving until 1982, when he retired, due to poor health. He died a few weeks after his retirement.

Trade union offices
Preceded by Harm Buiter	General Secretary of the International Confederation of Free Trade Unions; 1972–1982	Succeeded by John Vanderveken
