= Enzo Friso =

Italian former trade union leader (1927–2025)

Enzo Friso (1927–2025) was an Italian trade union leader.

== Life and career ==
Born in Padua, Friso became a metal worker and, in 1945, when trade unions were re-legalised, he joined the Italian General Confederation of Labour. In 1954, he began working full-time for the union as its secretary for the Aosta Valley, then in 1960 became its provincial secretary for Pavia. He represented the union at the 1962 Congress of the International Confederation of Free Trade Unions (ICFTU), and soon afterwards began working for the ICFTU as director of its Beirut office. In 1968, he was transferred to Jakarta, then Brussels in 1970. This was the headquarters of the confederation, and Friso became its lead on unions in Latin America.

In 1984, Friso was elected as assistant general secretary of the ICFTU, then in 1992 he became general secretary, but he took early retirement at the end of 1994.

Friso died in 2025.

Trade union offices
Preceded by John Vanderveken	Assistant General Secretary of the International Confederation of Free Trade Unions; 1984–1992	Succeeded by Eddy Laurijssen
Preceded by John Vanderveken	General Secretary of the International Confederation of Free Trade Unions; 1992–1994	Succeeded by Bill Jordan
