= Bertha Braunthal =

German politician (1887–1967)

Bertha Braunthal Bertha Braunthal-Clark
- Born: 1 February 1887; Vienna, Austria-Hungary
- Died: Q2 1968; Islington, London, England
- Occupations: activist, journalist and politician
- Political party: SPÖ; USPD; KPD; CPGB
- Spouse: Willie Norby Clark
- Parent(s): Maier Braunthal (1836-1914); Klara Zoller/Braunthal (1862-1940)

Bertha Braunthal (1 February 1887 – 1968) was a communist politician in Germany from the party's creation in 1920 till her emigration to London in 1933. She was also a first-wave feminist.

Sources sometimes identify her as Bertha Braunthal-Clark, reflecting her marriage in or before 1933 to the Scottish born communist Willie Norby Clark.

== Life ==
Braunthal was the eldest of six children born into a Jewish family in Vienna. Her father, Maier Braunthal (1836–1914), originally from Odessa, worked as an accountant. Two of her younger brothers, Julius Braunthal (1891–1972) and Alfred Braunthal (1897–1980) would also grow up to become notable as pioneers of twentieth century socialism.

During the First World War she moved to the Netherlands and obtained a clerical job with a manufacturing company (the Netherlands managed to avoid direct involvement in the First World War.) After that, instead of moving back to what remained of Austria, she took a job in Berlin. Before the war, in Austria, she had been a member of the Social Democratic Party. In 1917 its German equivalent split, primarily over the question of whether or not to continue supporting the government in its determination to continue with the war. Braunthal became a member of the breakaway Independent Social Democratic Party ("Unabhängige Sozialdemokratische Partei Deutschlands" / USPD). After the war ended, at the Party Conference which took place at Leipzig in December 1919, she was one of six people elected to the secretariat of the USPD Central Committee. During the later war years she may also have been involved with the Spartacus League. She played a part in the revolutionary turbulence that followed the war, working in Berlin as secretary to the propaganda department of the Greater Berlin Executive Council of the Workers' and Soldiers' Councils. (Note: "Vollzugsrat des Arbeiter- und Soldatenrates Groß-Berlin" "Greater Berlin Executive Council of the Workers' and Soldiers' Councils")

Braunthal positioned herself on the left wing of the USPD. From March 1920 she took a leading role on party propaganda work that focused on women. She worked on the party newspaper, Die Kämpferin (Note: Die Kämpferin "The [female] battler" / The Woman Warrior). As further realignment of the political left approached, in October 1920 she attended the "breakup party congress" ("Spaltungsparteitag") in Halle and was elected to the four person Secretariat of the USPD Central Committee. Two months later, at the "unification party congress" in Berlin, the left wing majority of the USPD agreed to unite with the recently created Communist Party of Germany. Braunthal was elected to the party executive and took over leadership of its Women's Secretariat, a post she retained till 1923, when she was succeeded in the post by Erna Lang. During this period she was working alongside Clara Zetkin, Hertha Sturm and Martha Arendsee editing the party newspaper, Die Kommunistin ("The Woman Communist").

Braunthal participated at the Second International Communist Women's Conference in June 1921 before travelling on to Moscow to join in at the World Congress of the Communist Third International. As the German communists sustained their reputation for factionalism, during the internal party crisis of 1921 she was part of the left-wing majority on the Party Executive that voted through the expulsion of Paul Levi. In August 1921 at the Seventh Party Conference at Jena, and again at the Eighth Party Conference at Leipzig in January/February 1923, she was re-elected to the Party Executive and mandated to lead the party's Women's Secretariat.

Later Bertha Braunthal-Clark and her Scottish born husband worked together on the Comintern newspaper Inprekorr ("International Press Correspondence") which had been set up in 1921 by Gyula Alpári. It is not clear whether Bertha accompanied Willie Clark when he was working for Inprecor in Vienna in 1929, but he relocated to Berlin in 1930.

The Nazis took power in January 1933 and lost little time in converting the German state into a one-party dictatorship. Party political activity (unless in support of the Nazi party) became illegal. Willie and Bertha moved to London. They had already been working on creating an English language edition of Inprecor, and now they worked on a weekly newspaper entitled "World News and Views" which was in effect an English successor to that. While retaining her membership of the exiled German Communist Party, Bertha Clark now also joined its British counterpart.

According to one left-leaning source, Willie and Bertha Clarks were subject to constant surveillance by the British security services after they moved to London, and there is certainly a file with their names on it. No source has been located to suggest that they were arrested and detained by the British authorities in 1940, however.

After the unexpected dissolution of the Comintern in 1943, Bertha Clark undertook translation work for the British Communist Party. She died in the London quarter of Islington during the early summer of 1968. Some sources give the year of her death as 1967.
