= Der Kampf (magazine) =

Monthly political magazine in Austria (1907–1938)

- Categories: Political magazine
- Frequency: Monthly
- Publisher: Verlag der Wiener Volksbuchhandlung
- Founded: 1907
- First issue: October 1907
- Final issue: 1938
- Country: Austria
- Based in: Vienna; Prague; Brno
- Language: German
- OCLC: 1716851

Der Kampf (German: The Struggle) was a monthly political magazine published in the period between 1907 and 1938. It was first headquartered in Vienna and then in Prague and Brno. It was affiliated with the Austrian Social Democratic Party (SDAP), and its subtitle was Sozialdemokratische Monatsschrift (German: Social democratic monthly).

== History and profile ==
Der Kampf was launched by the Austrian social democrats, including Otto Bauer, Adolf Braun and Karl Renner in October 1907. It was modeled on Die Neue Zeit which had been founded by Karl Kautsky. Its major goal was to provide a platform for the discussions about the theoretical issues and those regarding the Austrian workers' movement. Der Kampf supported modern science and the methods of social research.

The editors of Der Kampf included Otto Bauer, Adolf Braun and Karl Renner. It was published by Georg Emmerling on a monthly basis in Vienna until February 1934 when it was banned.

From 1934 to 1938 Der Kampf was published illegally and was first based in Prague and then in Brno.

== Content and contributors ==
In February 1933 Der Kampf published an exchange between Friedrich Adler and Karl Kautsky about the socialist democracy. Its leading contributors included Max Adler, Friedrich Austerlitz, Robert Danneberg, Julius Deutsch, Wilhelm Ellenbogen, Ludo Hartmann, Rudolf Hilferding, Engelbert Pernerstorfer, Pavel Axelrod, August Bebel, and Emile Vandervelde. A short article on terrorism by Leon Trotsky was also featured in Der Kampf. Otto Bauer published a total of 152 articles in the journal which were mostly concerned with the national and international political events as well as problematic issues regarding the international workers’ movement and the Social Democratic Party. Bauer used various pseudonyms such as Karl Mann and Heinrich Weber, but he also used his name in these articles. One of the articles written by Max Adler was about the effects of the unemployment on the class consciousness of working class.

Julius Braunthal was among the members of the editorial board of Der Kampf. He also contributed to the magazine and published the first article on Fascism entitled "Der Putsch der Fascisten" in November 1922 shortly after the March on Rome, an organized mass demonstration and a coup d'état by Benito Mussolini's National Fascist Party.
