= Woman of Tehuantepec (Modotti) =

Photograph by Tina Modotti

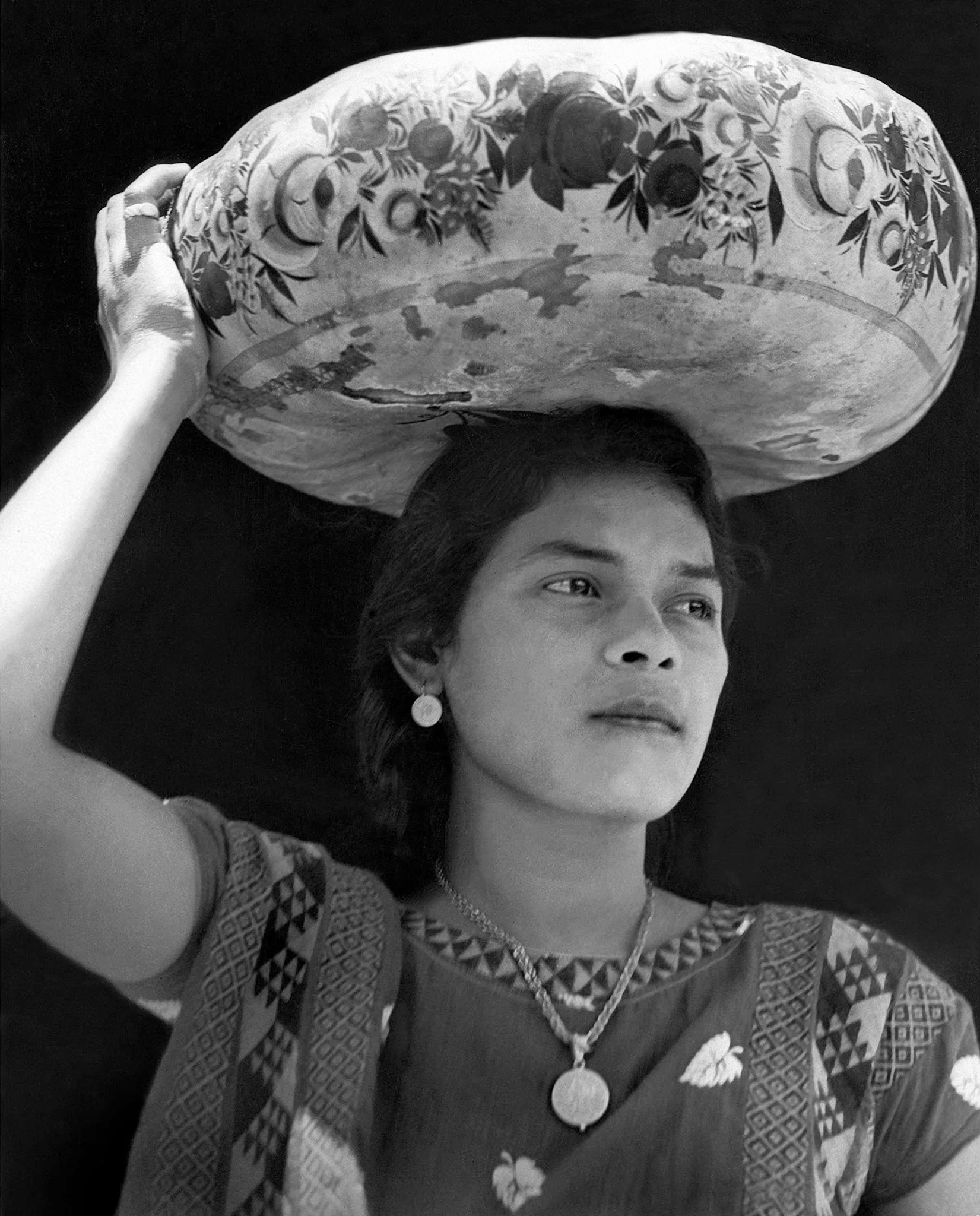
- Woman of Tehuantepec, by Tina Modotti, copy from Getty
- Artist: Tina Modotti
- Year: circa 1929

Woman of Tehuantepec is a photograph by the Italian photographer Tina Modotti. Taken circa 1929 in Tehuantepec, Oaxaca, Mexico, it is included in the Life publication 100 Photographs that Changed the World.

The image depicts a woman in Tehuantepec, carrying a calabash on her head. The photograph is known for capturing the traditional dress of Tehuantepec women, which was also adopted by Frida Kahlo.

It is in the public domain in most countries, as the photographer died more than 80 years ago, and it was published more than 95 years ago.

== See also ==
- List of photographs considered the most important
