= Tina Modotti =

Italian-born photographer and actress, active in the US and Mexico

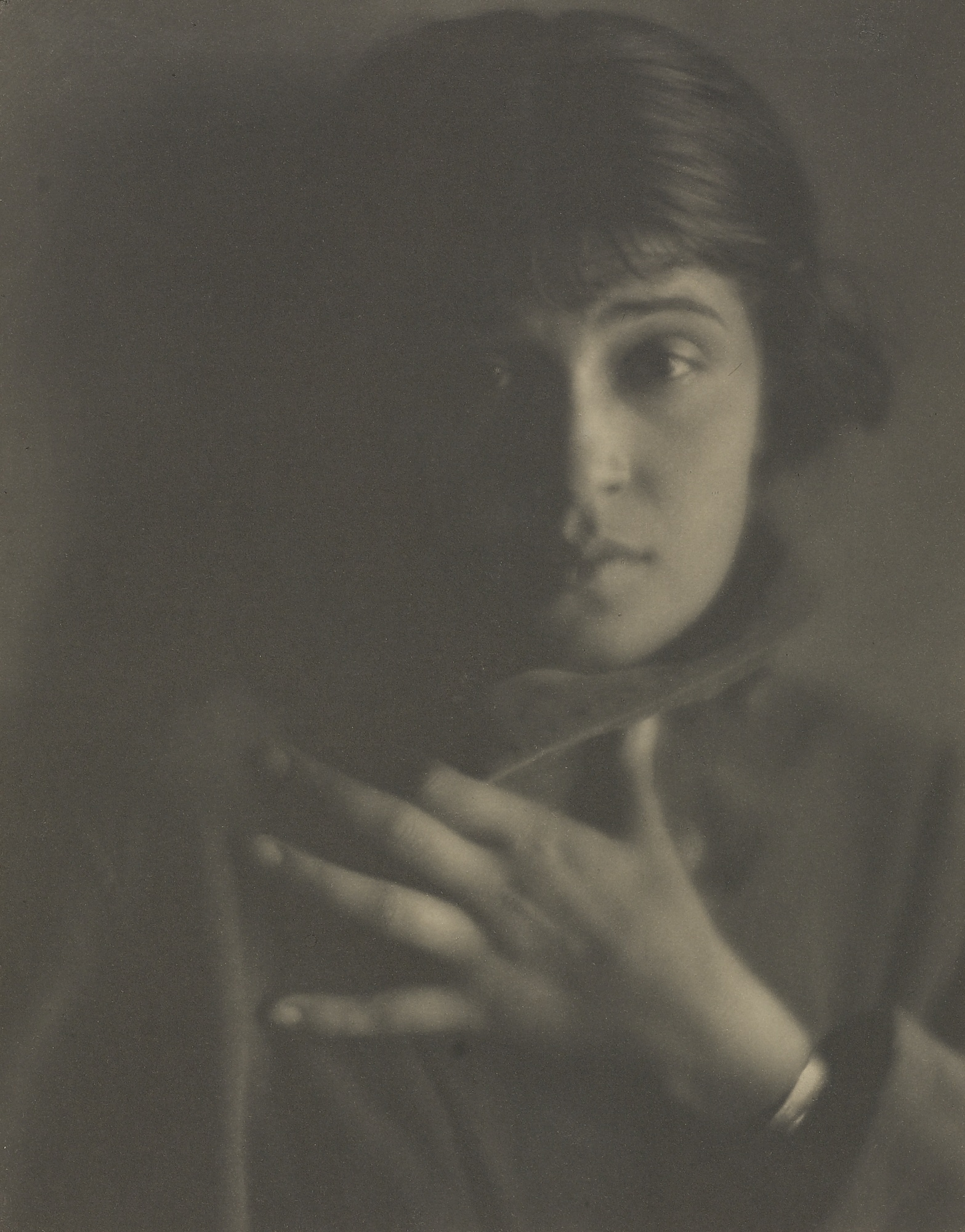
- Tina Modotti photographed by Edward Weston in 1921
- Born: Assunta Adelaide Luigia Modotti Mondini; August 16/17, 1896; Udine, then part of the Kingdom of Italy
- Died: January 5, 1942 (aged 45); Mexico City, Mexico
- Known for: Photography
- Partner(s): Roubaix de l'Abrie Richey (1918–1922, his death); Edward Weston (1921–1927)

Tina Modotti (born Assunta Adelaide Luigia Modotti Mondini, August 16/17, 1896 – January 5, 1942) was an Italian and American photographer, model, actor, and revolutionary political activist for the Comintern. She left her native Italy in 1913 and emigrated to the United States, where she settled in San Francisco with her father and sister. In San Francisco, Modotti worked as a seamstress, model, and theater performer and, later, moved to Los Angeles where she worked in film. She later became a photographer and essayist. In 1922 she moved to Mexico, where she became an active member of the Mexican Communist Party.

== Early life ==
Modotti was born Assunta Adelaide Luigia Modotti Mondini in Udine, Friuli, Italy. Her mother, Assunta, was a seamstress; her father, Giuseppe, was a mason. After spending time living in Austria, where her parents were migrant workers, the family returned to Udine, where the young Modotti worked in a textile factory. In 1913, at the age of 16, she emigrated to the United States to join her father in San Francisco, California. Departing from Genoa aboard the SS Moltke on June 24, she traveled alone, according to Letizia Argenteri, author of Tina Modotti: Between Art and Revolution, arriving on July 8 at Ellis Island, where she "declared herself to be single, five feet one inch tall, in good mental and physical health, and a student." She carried with her "100 dollars and a train ticket for San Francisco, where her father and her sister Mercedes resided."

== Acting career ==
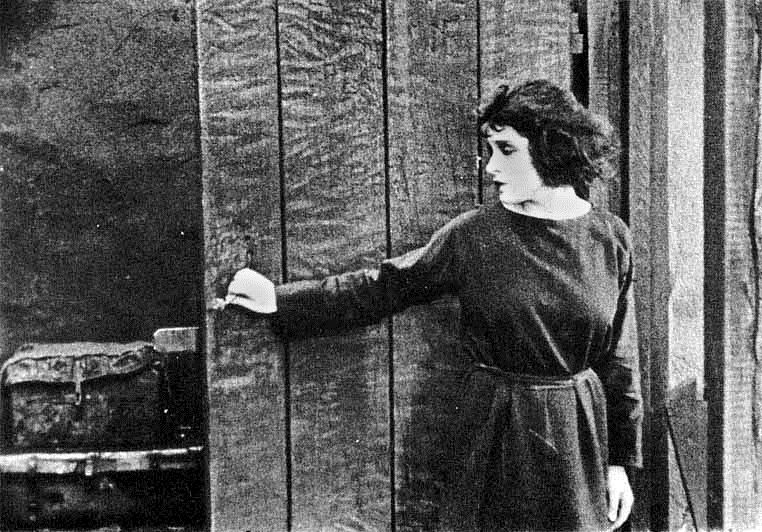
Tina Modotti in the film The Tiger's Coat (1920)

Attracted to the performing arts supported by the Italian émigré community in the San Francisco Bay Area, Modotti experimented with acting. She appeared in several plays, operas, and silent movies in the late 1910s and early 1920s, and also worked as an artist's model.

In 1917, she met Roubaix "Robo" de l'Abrie Richey. Originally a farm boy from Oregon named Ruby Ritchie, the artist and poet assumed the more bohemian name Roubaix. In 1918, Modotti began a romantic relationship with him and moved with him to Los Angeles to pursue a career in the motion picture industry. Although the couple cohabited and lived as a "married couple", they were not married. She was listed as a U.S. citizen in the 1920 Los Angeles township census. Often playing the femme fatale, Modotti's movie career culminated in the 1920 film The Tiger's Coat. She had minor parts in two other films.

The couple entered into a bohemian circle of friends. One of these fellow bohemians was Ricardo Gómez Robelo. Another was the photographer, Edward Weston.

== Photography career ==
As a young girl in Italy her uncle, Pietro Modotti, maintained a photography studio. Later in the U.S., her father briefly ran a similar studio in San Francisco. While in Los Angeles, she met the photographer Edward Weston and his creative partner Margrethe Mather. It was through her relationship with Weston that Modotti developed as an important fine art photographer and documentarian. By 1921, Modotti was Weston's lover. Ricardo Gómez Robelo became the head of Mexico's Ministry of Education's Fine Arts Department, and persuaded Robo to come to Mexico with a promise of a job and a studio.

Robo left for Mexico in December 1921. Perhaps unaware of his affair with Modotti, Robo took with him prints of Weston's, hoping to mount an exhibition of his and Weston's work in Mexico. While she was on her way to be with Robo, Modotti received word of his death from smallpox on February 9, 1922. Devastated, she arrived two days after his death. In March 1922, determined to see Robo's vision realized, she mounted a two-week exhibition of Robo's and Weston's work at the National Academy of Fine Arts in Mexico City. She sustained a second loss with the death of her father, which forced her to return to San Francisco later in March 1922. In 1923, Modotti returned to Mexico City with Weston and his son Chandler, leaving behind Weston's wife Flora and their youngest three children. She agreed to run Weston's studio free of charge in return for his mentoring her in photography.

Together they opened a portrait studio in Mexico City. Modotti and Weston quickly gravitated toward the capital's bohemian scene and used their connections to create an expanding portrait business. Together they found a community of cultural and political "avant-gardists", which included Frida Kahlo, Lupe Marín, Diego Rivera, and Jean Charlot. In general, Weston was moved by the landscape and folk art of Mexico to create abstract works, while Modotti was more captivated by the people of Mexico and blended this human interest with a modernist aesthetic, all the while shunning the term 'artist', insisting she merely wanted to "capture social realities". Modotti also became the photographer of choice for the blossoming Mexican mural movement, documenting the works of José Clemente Orozco and Diego Rivera. Between 1924 and 1928, Modotti took hundreds of photographs of Rivera's murals at the Secretariat of Public Education in Mexico City. Modotti's visual vocabulary matured during this period, such as her formal experiments with architectural interiors, blooming flowers, urban landscapes, and especially in her many beautiful images of peasants and workers during the depression. In 1926, Modotti and Weston were commissioned by Anita Brenner to travel around Mexico and take photographs for what would become her influential book Idols Behind Altars. The relative contributions of Modotti and Weston to the project has been debated. Weston's son Brett, who accompanied the two on the project, indicated that the photographs were taken by Edward Weston.

In 1925, Modotti joined International Red Aid, a Communist organization. In November 1926, Weston left Mexico and returned to California. During this time Modotti met several political radicals and Communists, including three Mexican Communist Party leaders who would all eventually become romantically linked with her: Xavier Guerrero, Julio Antonio Mella, and Vittorio Vidali.

Starting in 1927, a much more politically active Modotti (she joined the Mexican Communist Party that year) found her focus shifting and more of her work becoming politically motivated. Around that time her photographs began appearing in publications such as Mexican Folkways, Forma, and the more radically motivated El Machete, the German Communist Party's Arbeiter-Illustrierte-Zeitung (AIZ), and New Masses. From 1929 she contributed to Der Kuckuck, a publication of the Austrian Social Democratic Party.

Mexican photographer Manuel Álvarez Bravo divided Modotti's career as a photographer into two distinct categories: "Romantic" and "Revolutionary", with the former period including her time spent as Weston's darkroom assistant, office manager and, finally, creative partner. Her later works were the focus of her one-woman retrospective exhibition at the National Library in December 1929, which was advertised as "The First Revolutionary Photographic Exhibition In Mexico".

== Life as an activist ==
Modotti began a relationship with Xavier Guerrero, who was a member of the Mexican Communist Party, in 1927. Guerrero was sent to Moscow for a year to take part in political party training, and by 1928 Modotti had met and begun a relationship with the exiled Cuban activist Julio Antonio Mella. During this same period, economic and political conflicts within Mexico and indeed much of Central and South America were intensifying and this included increased repression of political dissidents. In 1929, Mella was assassinated while walking in the street with Modotti from the offices of Red Aid, a Comintern-attached organization that offered relief to and defended victims of political repression. Modotti was immediately arrested, but later released and cleared of his murder. Shortly thereafter, an attempt was made on the life of the Mexican President Pascual Ortiz Rubio. Modotti – who was a target of both the Mexican and Italian political police — was questioned about both crimes amidst a concerted anti-communist, anti-immigrant press campaign, that depicted "the fierce and bloody Tina Modotti" as the perpetrator (a Catholic zealot, Daniel Luis Flores, was later charged with shooting Ortiz Rubio. José Magriñat was arrested for Mella's murder).

As a result of the anti-communist campaign by the Mexican government, Modotti was exiled from Mexico in 1930. She first spent several months in Berlin, followed by several years in Moscow. Traveling on a restricted visa that mandated her final destination as Italy, Modotti initially stopped in Berlin and from there visited Switzerland. The Italian government made concerted efforts to extradite her as a subversive national, but with the assistance of International Red Aid activists, she evaded detention by the fascist police. She apparently intended to make her way into Italy to join the anti-fascist resistance there. In response to the deteriorating political situation in Germany and her own exhausted resources, however, she followed the advice of Vittorio Vidali and moved to Moscow in 1931. After 1931, Modotti no longer photographed. Reports of later photographs are unsubstantiated.

During the next few years she engaged in various missions on behalf of the Workers International Relief organizations as a Comintern agent in Europe. When the Spanish Civil War erupted in 1936, Vidali (then known as "Comandante Carlos") and Modotti (using the pseudonym "Maria") left Moscow for Spain, where they stayed and worked until 1939. She worked with Canadian Dr. Norman Bethune during the disastrous retreat from Málaga in 1937. In 1939, following the collapse of the Republican movement in Spain, Modotti left Spain with Vidali and returned to Mexico under a pseudonym.

== Death ==
In 1942, at the age of 45, Modotti died from heart failure while on her way home in a taxi from a dinner at Hannes Meyer's home in Mexico City, under what are viewed by some as suspicious circumstances. After hearing about her death, Diego Rivera suggested that Vidali had orchestrated it. Modotti may have 'known too much' about Vidali's activities in Spain, which included a rumoured 400 executions. An autopsy showed that she died of a natural cause, congestive heart failure. Her grave is located within the vast Panteón de Dolores in Mexico City. Poet Pablo Neruda composed Modotti's epitaph, part of which can also be found on her tombstone, which also includes a relief portrait of Modotti by engraver Leopoldo Méndez:

Pure your gentle name, pure your fragile life,
bees, shadows, fire, snow, silence and foam,
combined with steel and wire and
pollen to make up your firm
and delicate being.

== Murals by Diego Rivera that include Modotti ==
- The Abundant Earth, The National Agricultural School, Chapingo, 1926

In 1926, Diego Rivera's wife Lupe Marín asserted that her separation from her husband was caused by his affair with Modotti, which had arisen from Modotti's nude modeling for him for the murals as the Abundant Earth at the National Agricultural School in Chapingo, near Texcoco [1926–27]. Their affair lasted for about a year and he painted her five times in the Chapingo murals, including as The Earth Enslaved, Germination, and Virgin Earth.

- In the Arsenal, Secretaría de Educación Pública Building, Mexico City, 1928

This painting was part of the break between Modotti and Rivera caused by his expulsion from the Communist Party. The mural depicts Modotti passing out ammunition, perhaps for the revolution of Augusto Sandino in Nicaragua, perhaps for the "invasion" of Cuba that Mella was planning at that time hoping to overthrow the regime of General Gerardo Machado, or perhaps just in support of insurrection against injustice everywhere. She is shown gazing at her then lover Mella while Vidali peers over her shoulder. Modotti objected to Rivera's use of her private life in such a public manner. She wrote to Weston, "Recently Diego has taken to painting details with an exaggerated precision. He leaves nothing to the imagination." The central figure in this painting is Rivera's then-lover, the artist Frida Kahlo. Kahlo, who had first met Rivera as a schoolgirl in 1922 when he was painting his first mural The Creation in the Bolívar Auditorium of the National Preparatory School in Mexico City, is reputed to have been reintroduced to Rivera in 1928 at a party in Modotti's home, although there are other versions of the tale of their meeting. Modotti hosted Kahlo and Rivera's wedding party on August 21, 1929. The final rift between Modotti on the one hand and Rivera and Kahlo on the other, less than a month later, appears to have been political rather than personal. Modotti supported Rivera's expulsion from the Communist Party. Modotti's internationalism, and her belief that this was best advanced by adherence to the line of the Mexican Communist Party and the Communist International, were deeply held. Later, she explained her decision to abandon photography for political work following her expulsion from Mexico thus (inverting an outlook stated to her years earlier by Edward Weston): "I cannot solve the problem of life by losing myself in the problem of art". Rivera's expulsion started him on a trajectory which was to lead to his later association with Leon Trotsky and the Fourth International.

== Select photography exhibitions ==
In 1996 the Philadelphia Museum of Art organized a large-scale retrospective dedicated to the artist, entitled Tina Modotti: Photographs. Martha Chahroudi, the museum's curator of photography, organized the exhibition. To raise funds for the show, the singer Madonna auctioned her 1963 Mercedes-Benz. Madonna has become a major collector of Modotti's work. In 2006, the San Francisco Museum of Modern Art organized an exhibition entitled Mexico as Muse: Tina Modotti and Edward Weston.

Prior to the presentation of her work in the U.S., Modotti's photographs have been shown in Italy, Poland, Germany, Austria, and other countries. In 2010, the largest exhibition of her work, Tina Modotti Photographer and Revolutionary opened at the KunstHausWien in Vienna, Austria. It presented 250 photographs, many never shown before. The exhibition is based on the collections of Galerie Bilderwelt, Berlin and Spencer Throckmorton, NYC and curated by Reinhard Schultz. In 2015 the exhibition Tina Modotti: Photographs of Mexican Murals was organized at the Richard Norton Gallery. The State Museum and Exhibition Center ROSPHOTO in Saint Petersburg, Russia, organized an exhibition of Modotti's work entitled "Tina Modotti. Art. Love. Revolution" from 20 September 2019 to 18 November 2019. In Italy, Palazzo Ducale in Genoa organized the exhibition "Donne, Messico e Libertà" from 8 April 2022 to 9 October 2022.

== Collections ==
Modotti's work is held in the following permanent collections:

- Art Institute of Chicago, Chicago, IL
- The Museum of Modern Art, New York
- San Francisco Museum of Modern Art, San Francisco, CA
- Metropolitan Museum of Art, New York
- Philadelphia Museum of Art, Philadelphia, PA
- Baltimore Museum of Art, Baltimore, MD

== In popular culture ==
Modotti was portrayed by Ashley Judd in the 2002 film Frida, about fellow artist Frida Kahlo. 2018 announcement by AG Studios, England to make a TV mini-series titled Radical Eye: The Life and Times of Tina Modotti, creatively helmed by Paula Alvarez Vaccaro and starring Monica Bellucci.

Google Doodles honored Modotti on what would have been her 121st birthday, showing on August 16, 2017. The doodle appears on Mexico's Google webpage.

== Gallery ==
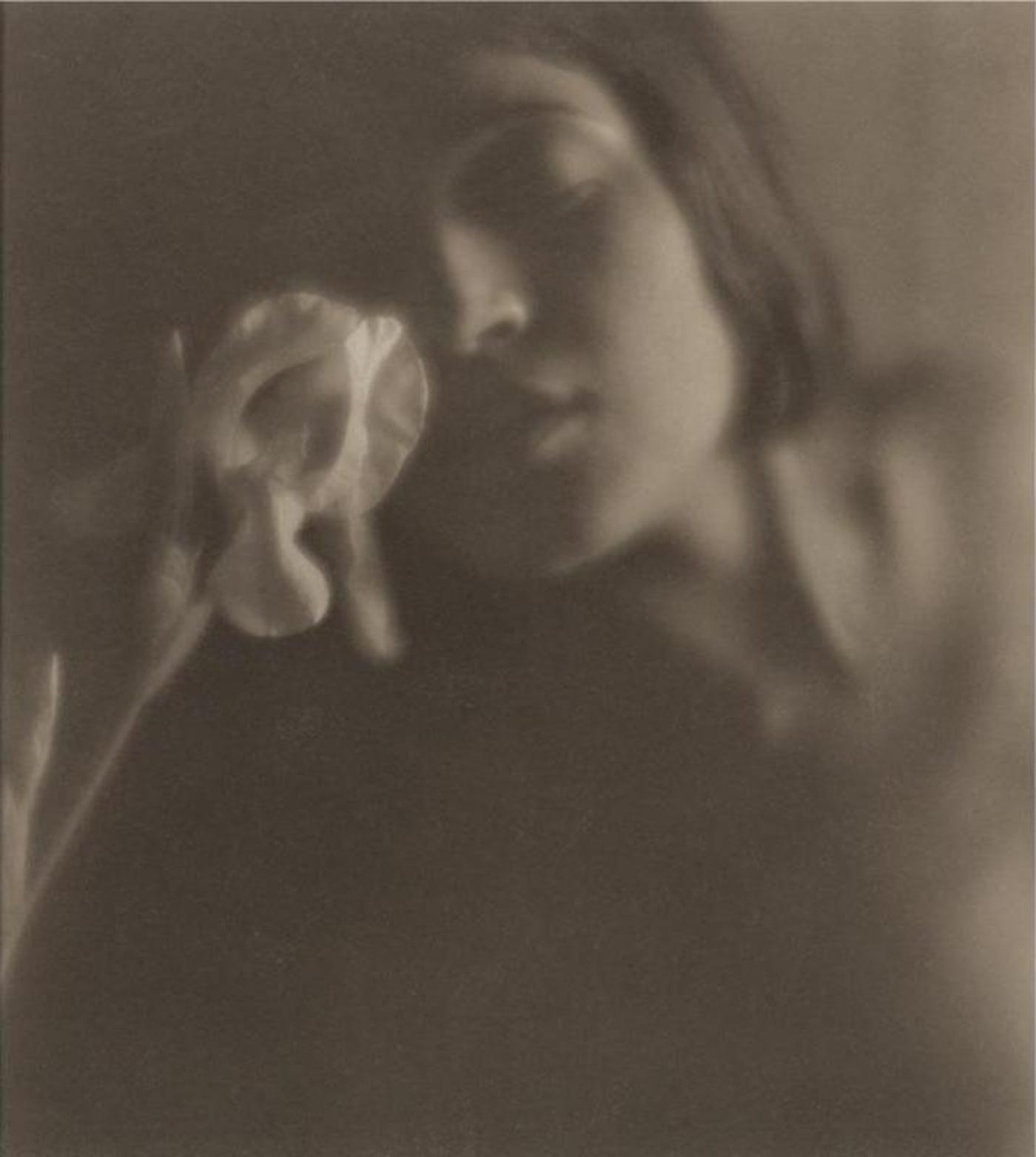
Modotti by Weston in 1921

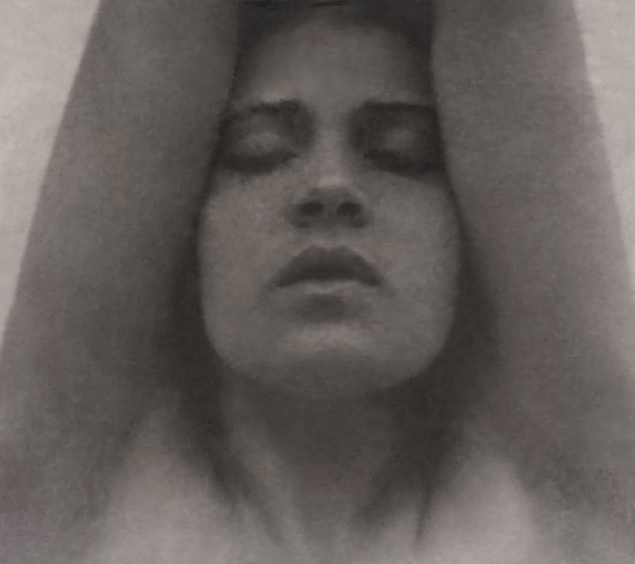
Tina Modotti with arms raised - Edward Weston, c. 1921

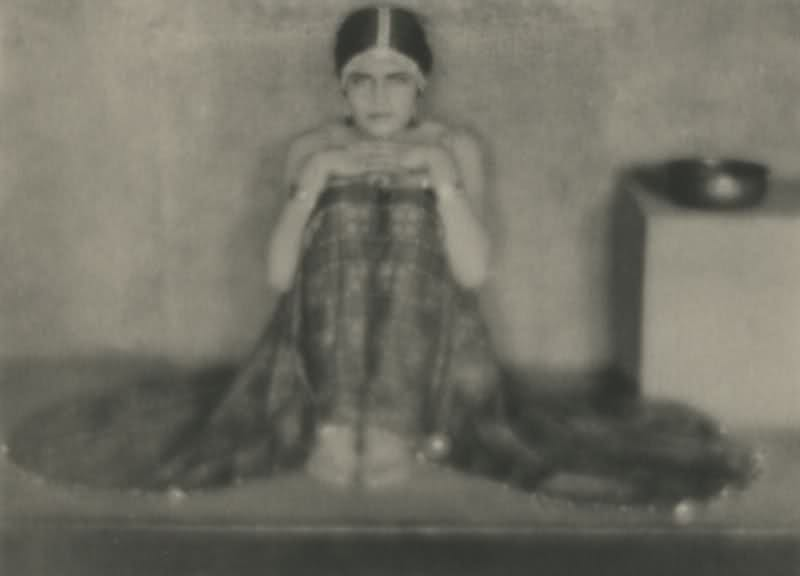
Tina Modotti by Jane Reece c. 1919

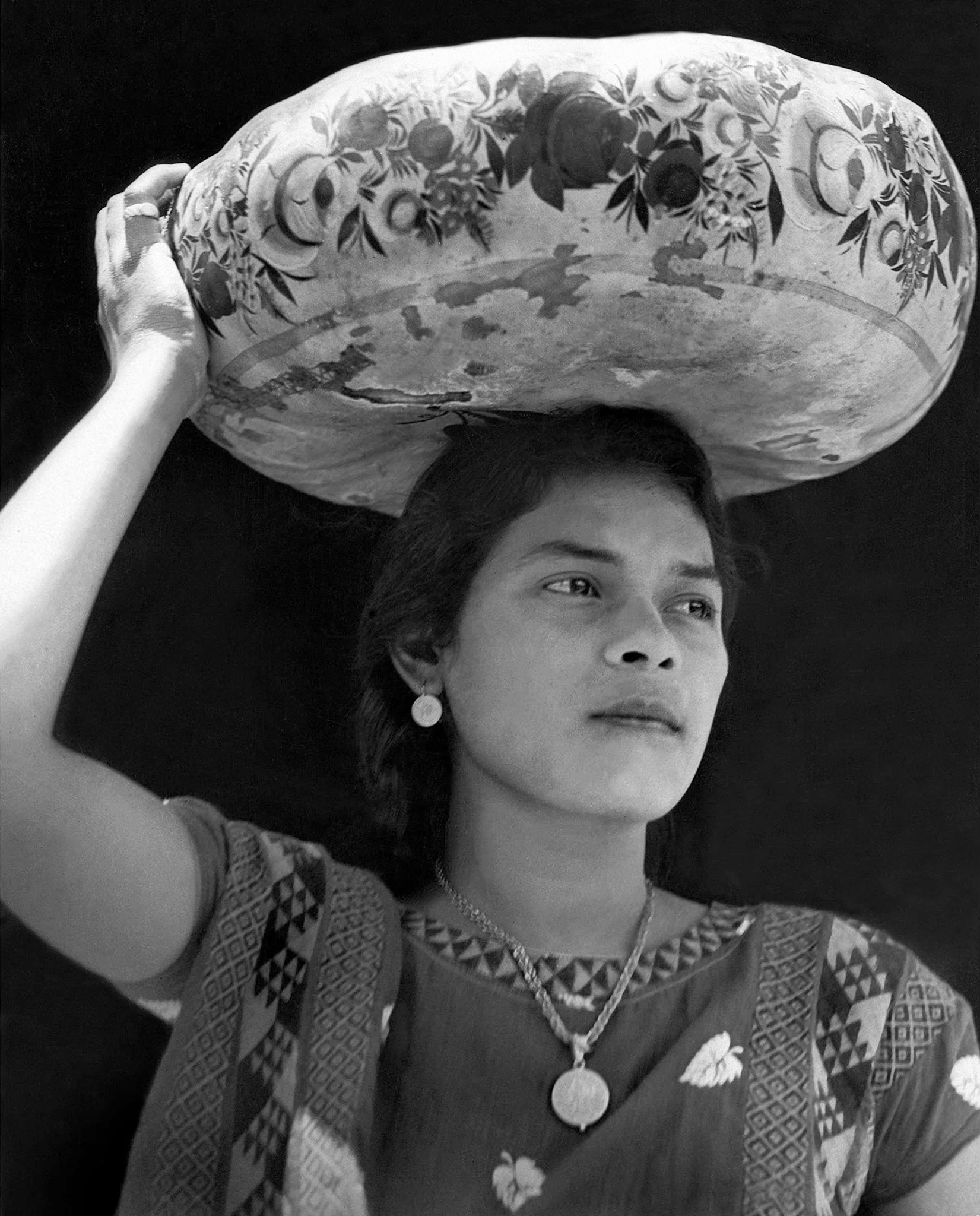
Woman of Tehuantepec, photograph by Modotti, 1929

== Filmography ==
- The Tiger's Coat (Lubin Studios, 1920)
- Riding With Death (Fox Film Corporation, 1921) as "Tina Medotti"
- I Can Explain (Pathe Exchange, 1922)
- Tina Modotti (Channel 4 1992 Documentary) 52 minutes, directed by Ceri Higgins and produced by Helen Kelsey
