= Julius Braunthal =

Austrian-born Jewish historian, magazine editor, and political activist

Julius Braunthal (1891–1972) was an Austrian-born historian, magazine editor, and political activist. Braunthal is best remembered as the Secretary of the Socialist International from 1951 to 1956 and for his massive three volume History of the International, first published in German between 1961 and 1971.

== Biography ==
=== Early years ===
Julius Braunthal was born in Vienna, Austria-Hungary on 5 May 1891.

During World War I Braunthal was an officer in the Austro-Hungarian army, winning a decoration for valor and rising to the rank of lieutenant by the end of the war.

=== Interwar period ===
After the war Braunthal served as an Assistant Secretary of State for the newly established Republic of Austria from 1918 to 1920.

A committed socialist, following his departure from government service Braunthal edited several socialist publications. He published the first article on Fascism entitled "Der Putsch der Fascisten" in Der Kampf, a theoretical monthly journal of the Socialist Party of Austria (SPÖ), in November 1922 shortly after March on Rome which was an organized mass demonstration and a coup d'état by Benito Mussolini's National Fascist Party. In 1924 Braunthal was editor of the Arbeiter-Zeitung, the official organ of the SPÖ. From 1927 to 1934 he served as editor of the popular socialist newspaper, Das Kleine Blatt (German: The Little Leaf), also published by the SPÖ. He also founded and edited the illustrated magazine Der Kuckuck (The Cuckoo) between 1929 and 1934.

Austrofascism began to rise in the middle 1930s and Brauthal was soon embroiled with difficulties with the new right wing regime. In 1934 Braunthal was arrested and jailed, charged with treason. He was ultimately expelled from the country in 1935, narrowly escaping the annexation of Austria to Nazi Germany three years later.

In 1938, Braunthal went into exile in Great Britain, where his elder sister Bertha Clark (1887–1967) had been living and working with her Scottish born husband since 1933, and where he would remain for the rest of his life.

Julius Braunthal was named an assistant secretary of the Labour and Socialist International in 1938, remaining in that capacity until the outbreak of World War II.

=== World War II and after ===
During World War II, Braunthal was the editor of the journal of the Labour and Socialist International, International Socialist Forum. He would serve in that capacity until 1948. Thereafter Braunthal was named as the Secretary of the International Socialist Conference, a transitional organization which preceded establishment of the new Socialist International. In 1951 Braunthal was named the first Secretary General of this new international institution. He would hold this post until 1956.

Following the end of his time as the head of the Socialist International, Braunthal turned his attention to the writing of history. He authored a three volume History of the International, detailing the institutional development of international socialism from the First International until the present day. The first volume of this work was published in 1961, with the third and final volume seeing print in 1971.

=== Death and legacy ===
Julius Braunthal died on 24 April 1972 in Teddington, England. He was 78 years old at the time of his death.

Braunthal's papers reside at the International Institute of Social History in Amsterdam, Netherlands.

== Works ==
- Die Arbeiterräte in Deutschösterreich. Vienna, 1919.
- Die Sozialpolitik der Republik. Vienna: Wiener Volksbuchhandlung, 1919.
- Kommunisten und sozialdemokraten. Vienna: Verlag der Wiener Volksbuchhandlung, 1920.
- Die Wiener Julitage 1927. Vienna: Verlag der Wiener Volksbuchhandlung, 1927.
- 40 Jahre 1. Mai. Vienna, 1929.
- Festschrift zur 2. Arbeiter-Olympiade. Vienna: Rotationstiefdruck: "Vorwärts," 1931.
- Need Germany Survive? London: Victor Gollancz, 1943.
- The Future of Austria: A Plea for the United States of Europe. London: Victor Gollancz, 1943.
- In Search of the Millennium. London: Victor Gollancz, 1945.
- The Paradox of Nationalism: An Epilogue to the Nuremberg Trials: Common-Sense Reflections in the Atomic Age. London: St. Botolph Publishing Co., 1946.
- The Tragedy of Austria. London: Victor Gollancz, 1948.
- "The Rebirth of Social Democracy," Foreign Affairs, vol. 27, no. 4 (July 1949), pp. 586–600. In JSTOR
- Der gegenwärtige Stand der sozialistischen Literatur. Bielefeld : Verlag Neue Gesellschaft, n.d. [c. 1955].
- Yearbook of the International Socialist Labour Movement. London: Lincolns-Prager, 1956.
- The Significance of Israeli Socialism and the Arab-Israeli Dispute. With J.B. Kripalani. London: Lincolns-Prager, 1958.
- Sozialistische Weltstimmen. Berlin: Verlag nach J.H.W. Dietz, 1958.
- Geschichte der Internationale, Vol. 1. Hannover, Germany: Verlag J.H.W. Dietz, 1961.
- Geschichte der Internationale, Vol. 2. Hannover, Germany: Verlag J.H.W. Dietz, 1963.
- Auf der Suche nach dem Millennium. Vienna: Europa Verlag, 1964.
- Socialism. The First 100 Years. Rome: Centre for Labour and Social Studies, 1964.
- Victor und Friedrich Adler; zwei Generationen Arbeiterbewegung. Vienna: Verlag der Wiener Volksbuchhandlung, 1965.
- History of the International: Volume 1: 1864-1914. New York: Frederick A. Praeger, Publishers, 1967.
- History of the International: Volume 2: 1914-1943. New York: Frederick A. Praeger, Publishers, 1967.
- Geschichte der Internationale, Vol. 3. Hannover, Germany: Verlag J.H.W. Dietz, 1971.
- History of the International: Volume 3: 1943-1968. London: Victor Gollancz, 1980.
