= International Confederation of Free Trade Unions =

International trade union federation

ICFTU
- International Confederation of Free Trade Unions
- Merged into: ITUC
- Founded: 7 December 1949
- Dissolved: 31 October 2006
- Headquarters: Brussels, Belgium
- Location: International
- Members: 155 million in 148 countries (2006)
- Affiliations: International
- Website: www.ituc-csi.org

The International Confederation of Free Trade Unions (ICFTU) was an international trade union. It came into being on 7 December 1949 following a split within the World Federation of Trade Unions (WFTU), and was dissolved on 31 October 2006 when it merged with the World Confederation of Labour (WCL) to form the International Trade Union Confederation (ITUC).

Prior to being dissolved, the ICFTU had a membership of 157 million members in 225 affiliated organisations in 148 countries and territories.

== History ==
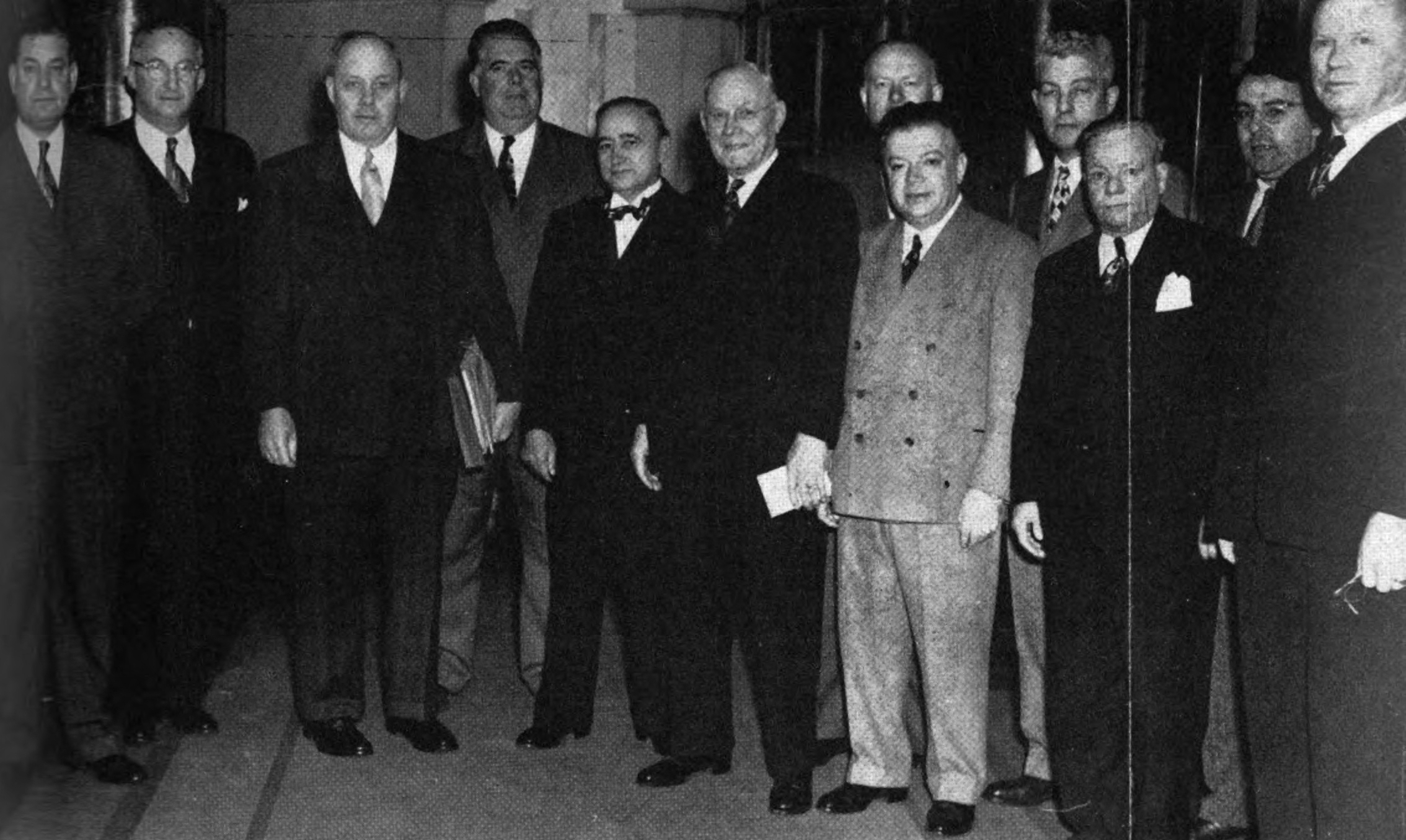
American Federation of Labor delegates to the ICFTU's founding conference in London, 1949. (L-R): George McGregor Harrison, Jay Lovestone, George Meany, William C. Doherty, Matthew Woll, William Green, Henry Rutz, David Dubinsky, George P. Delaney, James A. Brownlow, Irving Brown and Taylor Buchanan.

In 1949, early in the Cold War, alleging Communist domination of the WFTU's central institutions, a large number of non-communist national trade union federations (including the U.S. Congress of Industrial Organizations (CIO), the British TUC, the French FO, the Italian CISL and the Spanish UGT) seceded and created the rival ICFTU at a conference in London attended by representatives of nearly 48 million members in 53 countries.

Throughout its existence, the ICFTU had internal disputes over what approach to hold to communism.

From the 1950s the ICFTU actively recruited new members from the developing regions of first Asia and subsequently Africa. Following the collapse of Communist party government in the Soviet Union and eastern Europe, the Federation's membership has risen steeply from 87 million in 1988 and 100 million in 1992, as trade union federations from former Soviet bloc countries joined the ICFTU.

In 1975 former CIA agent Philip Agee claimed in his book "Inside the Company: CIA Diary" that the ICFTU was a "Labor center set up and controlled by the CIA to oppose the World Federation of Trade Unions (WFTU)."

The ICFTU was formally dissolved on 31 October 2006 when it merged with the World Confederation of Labour (WCL) to form the International Trade Union Confederation (ITUC).

== Organisation ==
The ICFTU had four regional organisations. APRO covered Asia and the Pacific, AFRO in Africa, and ORIT for the Americas. Until 1969, the ERO covered Europe, but it became increasingly marginal and was dissolved. The ICFTU later maintained close links with the European Trade Union Confederation (ETUC), which included all ICFTU European affiliates). It also worked closely with many Global Union Federations, which link together national unions from a particular trade or industry at international level.

Central to the ICFTU's work was the struggle to defend workers' rights. The ICFTU lobbied for the ratification of the so-called "core labour standards"—eight key conventions of the International Labour Organization concerning freedom of association, the abolition of child labour and forced labour and the elimination of discrimination in the workplace.

The ICFTU has staff which are devoted entirely to the monitoring and defence of workers rights, and they issue—almost on a daily basis—alerts and calls to action. The ICFTU published its "Annual Survey of Violations of Trade Union Rights" every June, the publication of which was usually accompanied by extensive press coverage of the violations of trade union rights around the world. The report often focused on the numbers of people killed for being members of unions.

In its constitution, the organisation pledged itself to "champion the cause of human freedom, promote equality of opportunity for all people, seek to eliminate everywhere in the world any form of discrimination or subjugation based on race, religion, sex or origin, oppose and combat totalitarianism and aggression in any form".

That constitution listed no fewer than seventeen aims of the organisation and it has been argued that the ICFTU from its very beginning set itself goals that would be impossible to achieve—particularly with a small staff and budget. For example, the organisation's constitution required it "to carry out a programme of trade union and workers' education" as well as to give "assistance to those suffering from the consequences of natural and industrial disasters".

In 2004 Australian union leader Sharan Burrow was elected as the first female president of the ICFTU.

== Annual survey of violations of trade union rights ==
ICFTU published an annual report which documents violations by governments, industries, and military and police forces against both workers and related trade unions.

=== 2006 report ===
Released on 7 June 2006 the report reprised the year 2005. The press release from ICFTU OnLine reports, "115 trade unionists were murdered for defending workers' rights in 2005, while more than 1,600 were subjected to violent assaults and some 9,000 arrested ... Nearly 10,000 workers were sacked for their trade union involvement, and almost 1,700 detained."

The report is divided into five regional sections, with detailed reports by country.

==== Africa ====
ICFTU wrote that, "One of the most striking features of the violations that took place in Africa is the failure of governments to respect the rights of their own employees, both through the restrictions in law on organising, collective bargaining and strike action, and repression in practice." The report continues on to detail violations such as the lack of the right to organise unions in the public service in Lesotho; the police use of stun guns, rubber bullets and tear gas at workers' strikes and protests in South Africa; and the death of a Djibouti drivers' union member during a demonstration by striking minibus and lorry drivers.

==== Americas ====
The report of violence in the Americas details a total of 80 deaths, more than half of the number reported worldwide. 70 of those deaths were in Colombia, while an additional 260 Colombian workers received death threats. In Ecuador 44 workers at the San Jose plantation were fired for forming a union. In Canada a collective agreement was imposed by law on members of the BCTF.

==== Asia and Pacific ====
ICFTU singled out Bangladesh, Cambodia, China, India, South Korea and the Philippines as having "particularly" violent episodes. In Bangladesh three trade unionists were killed when police intervened in a Sinha Textile Mill protest. In South Korea, Kim Tae-hwan from the Federation of Korean Trade Unions was run over and killed while on the picket line.

In the Philippines, Diosdado Fortuna, leader of the Food and Drug Industry Union, was shot dead by two unidentified gunmen, Victoria Ramonte of the Andres Soriano College Employees' Union was stabbed to death, and Ricardo Ramos, President of the Sugar Workers' Union was shot and killed.

==== Europe ====
The report on Europe begins by noting "Strong resistance to the creation of independent trade unions was a common trait across Central and Eastern Europe, both by employers and the State." Examples include an organised government attempt to coerce workers to leave independent trade unions in Moldova. Belarus is highlighted as wanting to return to Soviet-era trade union centres, with the ensuing close ties to the government.

The death of one trade unionist in Russia is reported. Although there are no details concerning the exact circumstances, he had previously received threats, and his house had been set on fire.

==== Middle East ====
In Iraq, during the first two months of 2005 Hadi Salih, international secretary of the Iraqi Federation of Trade Unions (IFTU) was brutally tortured and killed. Talib Khadim and Saady Edan, both also from the IFTU were attacked and kidnapped. Two attempts were made on the life of the president of the IFTU's Kirkuk branch. Ali Hassan Abd of the Oil and Gas Workers' Union was shot and killed in front of his children, and Ahmed Adris Abas of the Transport and Communications Union, was shot dead.

The report also details the difficulties faced by migrant workers in many countries, such as Kuwait, Lebanon, Oman, Qatar and Saudi Arabia, where they are a major portion of the labour force, but have few rights.

Qatar is singled out as a source of good news, with the country adopting a new labour code which, although still below international standards, allowed for the establishment of free trade unions.

== Leadership ==
=== General Secretaries ===
1949: Jacobus Hendrik Oldenbroek
1960: Omer Becu
1967: Harm Buiter
1972: Otto Kersten
1982: John Vanderveken
1992: Enzo Friso
1995: Bill Jordan
2002: Guy Ryder

=== Presidents ===
1949: Paul Finet
1951: Vincent Tewson
1953: Omer Becu
1957: Arne Geijer
1965: Bruno Storti
1972: Donald MacDonald
1975: P. P. Narayanan
1992: Roy Trotman
2000: Fackson Shamenda
2004: Sharan Burrow

== See also ==
- International Trade Union Confederation
- World Confederation of Labour
- World Federation of Trade Unions
- American Institute for Free Labor Development
- Global union federations
