= Federation of Trade Unions =

Federation of Trade Unions can refer to:

- All-China Federation of Trade Unions
- Federation of Independent Trade Unions of Russia
- Federation of Trade Unions of Belarus
- Federation of Trade Unions of Burma
- Federation of Trade Unions of Macedonia
- Federation of Trade Unions of the Republic of Kazakhstan
- Federation of Trade Unions of Ukraine
- Federation of Trade Unions of Uzbekistan
- General Federation of Trade Unions (Syria)
- Hong Kong Federation of Trade Unions
- International Federation of Trade Unions
- Kyrgyzstan Federation of Trade Unions
- World Federation of Trade Unions

== See also ==
- List of federations of trade unions
- Confederation of Trade Unions (disambiguation)
