= FTU =

FTU may refer to:

== Education ==
- Florida Technological University, now the University of Central Florida
- Foreign Trade University (Vietnam)
- Frederick Taylor University, in California, United States
- Frequent Traveler University, an annual convention and training symposium for users of travel vendors' loyalty programs

== Other uses ==
- Ultimate tensile strength
- Family Tracing Unit (Sri Lanka)
- Federation of Trade Unions (disambiguation)
- Fiji Teachers Union
- Finger tip unit
- First-time user experience
- Formazin Turbidity Unit
- Frascati Tokamak Upgrade
- Free the Universe, a 2013 album by Major Lazer
