= AGEP =

AGEP may refer to:

- Acute generalized exanthematous pustulosis
- AGEP Association Management, a Belgium-based consultancy for trade unions
- Platelet-activating factor, sometimes abbreviated as AGEPC
