= KFTU =

KFTU may refer to:

- KFTU-DT, a television station (channel 36) licensed to serve Douglas, Arizona, United States
- KFTU-CD, a low-power television station (channel 18) licensed to serve Tucson, Arizona, rebroadcasting KFTU-TV
- Kyrgyzstan Federation of Trade Unions, the national trade union center of Kyrgyzstan
