= Azerbaijan Trade Unions Confederation =

National trade union center of Azerbaijan

ATUC
- Azerbaijan Trade Unions Confederation
- Headquarters: Baku, Azerbaijan
- Location: Azerbaijan
- Members: 1.3 million
- Key people: Sahib A. Mammadov, chairman
- Affiliations: ITUC, GCTU
- Website: http://ahik.org/?language=en

The Azerbaijan Trade Unions Confederation (ATUC, in Azeri Azərbaycan Həmkarlar İttifaqları Konfederasiyası) a National trade union center of Azerbaijan. It has a membership of 1,338,000 and is led by Sattar S. Mehbaliyev as chairman.The Confederation covers 17,430 trade unions including Nakhchivan Autonomous Republic and 26 Area Trade Unions.

== Legislation ==
A law of Azerbaijan "On trade unions" which was adopted on 24 February 1994, defines the rights of trade unions and their members to protect their labor, social, and economic rights and legitimate interests in accordance with the Universal Declaration of Human Rights, the Convention and Recommendation of the International Labor Organization and the European Social Charter. Trade union legislation includes the Constitution of Azerbaijan and other legislative acts relating to the activities of trade unions of Azerbaijan. Trade unions may have local, regional, and national status.

== The bodies of ATUC ==
Congressional Assembly consists of 5 members from every member organization. Executive Committee includes just one member from every member organization. ATUC press body is Ulfet newspaper. The newspaper is member of ITUC since 2000.

ATUC's I Congress was held in 1998, II Congress in 2003, the III Congress in 2008, the IV Congress in 2013.

== Member organizations of ATUC ==
Trade Union Council of the Autonomous Republic of Nakhchivan was established on December 4, 1921. The Council includes 3 regional and 27 city/district, as well as 3 joint trade union committees.

Trade Union Federation “KEND-GIDA-ISH” - was established in 1906 as Trade Union of Manufacturers of Food Products with 230 members for the first time. In 1986, it was renamed Trade Union of Agrarian Industrial Complex` Workers, in 1991 Azerbaijan Trade Union of Agrarian Industrial Complex` Workers, and “KEND-GIDA-ISH” Trade Union Federation in 2000.

Trade Union Federation"Khidmeti-ISH"- was established on September 29, 2000. The Federation includes 5 republican committees: Trade union committee of trade, public catering and cooperative workers, health centers, tourism, sports, hotels, fishing, grain, Nakhchivan Autonomous Republic, Baku, Ganja and Sumgayit town trade union committees, 5 educational institutions, trade union committees of the National Culinary Center, and 52084 trade union members.

"Metal-Ish" Trade Union Federation- was established in 1996. It incorporates mining, metallurgy, heavy and general mechanical engineering, instrumentation, radio-electronic, automotive and agricultural machinery and other relevant field workers. Trade Union of Auto Transport and Road facilities Workers –was founded in XX century and has 14 000 members and incorporates 176 primary organizations. The trade union joined ISTU, as well as IFTW.

Trade Union Republican Committee of Municipal Workers- was established on 4 April 2002 in accord with the Constitution of Azerbaijan Republic, "Trade Unions" on law of Azerbaijan, legislative acts related to trade union activities to protect labor, social, and economic rights, in parallel lawful interests of the workers of this sector.

Trade Union of "Baku Steel Company" JSC Workers – was established on 6 October 2004. It gained the title LLC Trade Union Workers in 2010. The trade union has 1800 members working at "Baku Steel Company" and "Baku Oxygen Company" OJSC.

Trade Union Republican Committee of the workers of Government Agencies and Public Service unites trade union members working as public servants, as well as civil servants in the field of law enforcement, in banks and service areas. The trade union including 10 united, 75 city/rayon and 1475 primary organizations, has approximately 68 thousand members (25000 women and 13000 young people).

Trade Union Republican Committee of Railway Workers The first railway trade union organization of Azerbaijan Railways was established on 7 October 1905, in the conference of Transcaucasia, Vladikavkaz and Central Asia Railway Workers. After the establishment of the USSR the trade union was a part of the Transcaucasia Railway Trade Union. Once the Independent Azerbaijan Railway was organized on October 13, 1955, trade union of railway workers of Azerbaijan continued its activity independently. In 2001 it was called Independent Trade Union Republican Committee of Railway Workers including of 170 enterprises and organizations. It has about 30 thousand members.

Trade Union of Azerbaijan National Academy of Sciences was established in October 1992. The trade union with 9877 members includes 45 primary organizations. It joined Azerbaijan Trade Union Confederation in 1998. Once every 5 years a congress of the trade union is held which is organized by the Assembly.

Trade Union Republican Committee of Defense Industry Workers - was established in 1991. It connects the employees of defense industry and related enterprises, the areas of the Ministry of Defense of Azerbaijan dealing with similar activities, Institutions of State Special Engineering and Conversion Committee.

Trade Union Republican Committee of Cultural Workers - was founded on December 25, 1992, and joined ATUC in 1993. The trade union with 53.238 members includes 781 trade union organizations.

Trade Union of Metropolitan Workers - was established in 2003 and incorporated into the ATUC. 13 primary trade union committees, 41 workshop trade unions and 89 trade union organizations operate under TUMW. The trade union has 4657 members.

Trade Union Republican Committee of Oil and Gas Industry Workers - was reestablished in 1997. The trade union with 88667 members includes 6 committees on organizational and social-economic issues, collective agreements, labor and health protection, labor disputes, women and gender.

“Azersu” Trade Union of Workers of Water Economy - was established in accord with Azerbaijan's Constitution, and law of Azerbaijan “On Trade Unions” in March 2006 in order to represent and defend the labor rights of its members.

Trade Union of Natural Recourses and Ecology - was founded in 2002. The trade union has 11632 members and it includes 160 branches.

Free Trade Union Republican Committee of Local Industry and Communal Workers - was established in 1920 and joined ATUC in 1993. Approximately 22000 members joined the Trade Union which covers 235 trade union organizations it has.

== International Relations of ATUC ==
ATUC joined International Trade Unions Confederation (ITUC) in 2000 and General Trade Unions Confederation in 2004. The Confederation attends all seminars of ITUC. In parallel it has a representative in Executive Committee of ITUC. Azerbaijan Trade Unions Confederation cooperates with trade union centers of 70 countries such as NIS countries, Turkey, France, Belgium, England, Germany, Egypt, Japan, Bulgaria, and Chine.

Azerbaijan Trade Unions Confederation cooperates with international organizations such as Turkish Trade Union Confederations", Ukraine Trade Union Federation, Federation of Independent Trade Unions of Russia, Trade Union Federation of Sverdlovsk, Belarusian Congress of Democratic Trade Unions, Uzbekistan Trade Union Federation, Trade Union Federation of Kazakhstan, National Trade Union Confederation of Moldova, Poland Trade Union Confederation, Confederation of Labor of Bulgaria, Democratic League of Independent Trade Unions, General Labor Confederation of France, Congress of Trade Unions of Great Britain, Germany Trade Unions Confederation, Trade Unions of Egypt, Brazil, Denmark, Switzerland, Portugal, Japanese, Sweden, Finland, Latvian, Lithuanian, Estonian, Norwegian, Italy, Romania, Netherlands, Greek General Confederation of Labor.

At the same time ATUC signed an agreement with International organizations and national trade union centers such as Ukraine Trade Union Federation, Federation of Independent Trade Unions of Russia, Turkish trade union confederations, Trade Union Federation of Sverdlovsk, Georgian Trade Union Confederation, and Trade Union Federation of Kazakhstan.
