= Search Bureau for Missing Relatives =

Department to aid Holocaust survivors in locating loved ones

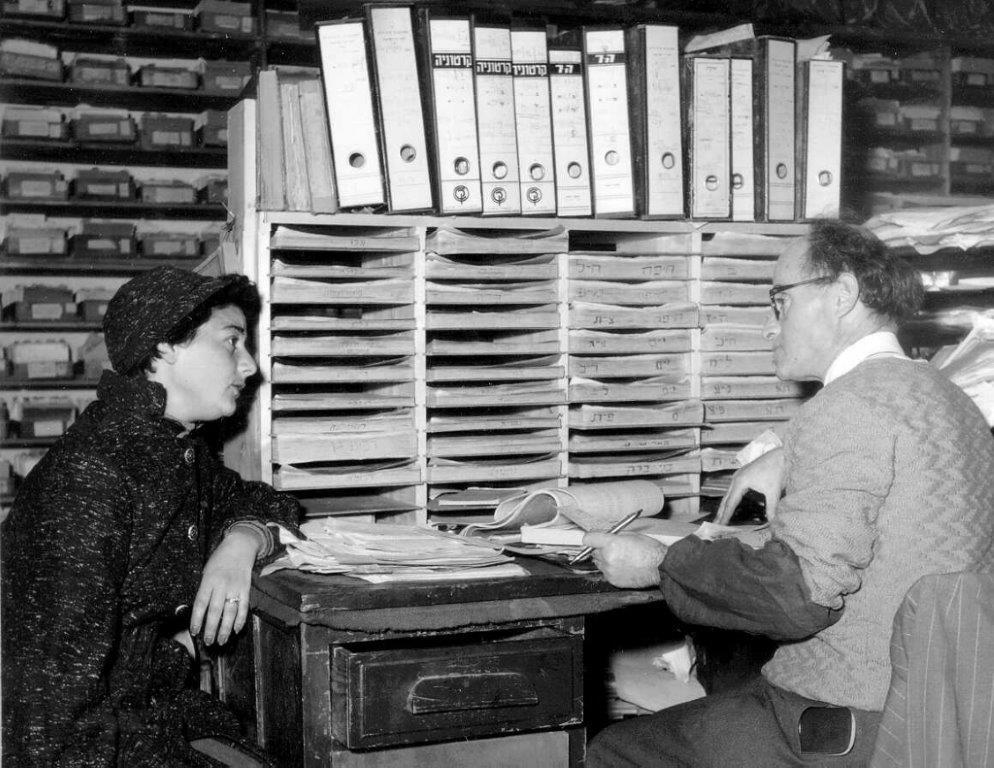
Search Bureau for Missing Relatives, 1957

Search Bureau for Missing Relatives (or Relatives Search Department; Hebrew: המדור לחיפוש קרובים) was a department in the Jewish Agency that was active between 1945 - 2002 with the purpose of helping Holocaust atrocities' survivors locate lost relatives and acquaintances.

== Inquiries to the Bureau ==
During the years the Bureau was active it recorded more than a million inquiries. The Bureau kept a record of these inquiries, and in the 1990s computerized these records. After the Bureau was closed, the database of these records, from the 1940s to the 1970s, was transferred to the Central Zionist Archives.

The Bureau's activities expanded over the years to include also search for missing relatives even not as a result of the Holocaust. For example, the Bureau acted during the mass Aliyah to Israel of the 90s, to trace in Israel the relatives of Jews in the former Soviet Union.

The inquiries of the missing relatives' seekers were filed into folders, and included data regarding the Applicant (usually name, address, date of birth, country of origin) and concerning the people it should locate. If there were any communications regarding the application or any attached documents, it was also filed into the folder along with the original application.

Inquiries portfolios were saved in the archives of the Jewish Agency. These portfolios are not open for public viewing, however, one can contact the Central Zionist Archives for information from the database of records and from the Bureau's portfolios.

== Relatives' search advertising and Survivors details ==
Relatives Search requests were published in the media in Israel and abroad. At the beginning, in Mandatory Palestine, these search requests were broadcast by Kol Yerushalayim (The Voice of Jerusalem) that later turned into Kol Yisrael (The Voice of Israel) after the establishment of the state of Israel. Abroad, these requests were broadcast by Kol Zion La Golah ("The Voice of Zion to the Diaspora"), a radio especially established to Broadcast from Israel to the Jewish diaspora. These broadcastings were both in Hebrew and Yiddish in order to reach the widest audience possible. Yael Ben-Yehuda, one of the announcers of "Search Bureau for Missing Relatives" program at Kol Yisrael radio, said in 2006 that for many years she avoided participating in advertisements for German companies after participating in this program.

Search requests were also published on the weekly Lakarov velarahok ("To [those] near and far"), produced by the Bureau in collaboration with the rescue committee. The Newsletter included details of the names of Holocaust survivors at Displaced persons camps in various European cities, lists of immigrants to Israel, Relatives Search requests, greeting messages on the radio etc. Overall, 73 editions were published (and one special supplement issued between the 38th and 39th edition), which included more than 180,000 names of survivors.

The Bureau also published the "Pinkas ha-Nitzolim" ("Register of Jewish Survivors.") booklets with the names of survivors. Volume I contained 60,000 names, and Volume II 58,000 names.

== Sources for tracing relatives ==
Among the sources of information used by the Bureau to locate relatives:

- Immigration certificates ("Pinkas Oleh"). From 1919, immigrants' lists were recorded, which chronologically documented the Jewish Immigration ("Aliyah") to Mandatory Palestine and later to the state of Israel. These lists included names, age and country of origin of immigrants by date of arrival of ships, aircraft or by pedestrian crossings. Apart from these Jewish immigrants, the records included passenger who arrived as tourists or as returning residents. It also included a column of "non-Jewish" or "Christian". Today, Immigration certificates are being reserved in the Central Zionist Archives and the Israel State Archives.
- ITS archives. The International Tracing Service (ITS), which existed in various incarnations since 1943, and from 1954 is managed by the Red Cross, and supervised by a committee of representatives of the governments of member states, including the State of Israel. These archives consists of millions of documents from Nazi Germany, including documents found in concentration camps after the camps were liberated, including documents about the deportation of civilians, forced laborers, refugees etc.

== The next-generation successors of the Search Bureau for Missing Relatives ==
- An Israeli radio show in the format of the Search Bureau for Missing Relatives was aired between 2000 and 2002 in cooperation with Kol Yisrael, the Jewish Agency, and the Central Zionist Archives. The search in the Zionist Archives, which included eight million documents, was carried out by the Sherut Leumi girls serving there.
- In 2007, an Israeli radio program in the same format and with the same name: "Search Bureau for Missing Relatives", was renewed by Yaron Enosh on KolYisrael, which is broadcast five times a week. The program is based on inquiries of listeners to the show, about 150 a day. The inquiries for missing persons are from the period of the Holocaust, however there are also inquiries for MIAs, and even for the resumption of relations that were cut off in different times and for different circumstances. In April 2012, the show moved to the presentation and editing of Izzy Mann.
- The Israeli Ministry of Immigrant Absorption provides search services for new immigrants in search of their relatives in Israel.
- The International Tracing Unit of Magen David Adom is the present-generation successor of the Search Bureau for Missing Relatives, under the authority of the Red Cross and the International Tracing Service.
