= Eva Blasco García =

Spanish lawyer and businesswoman (born 1964)

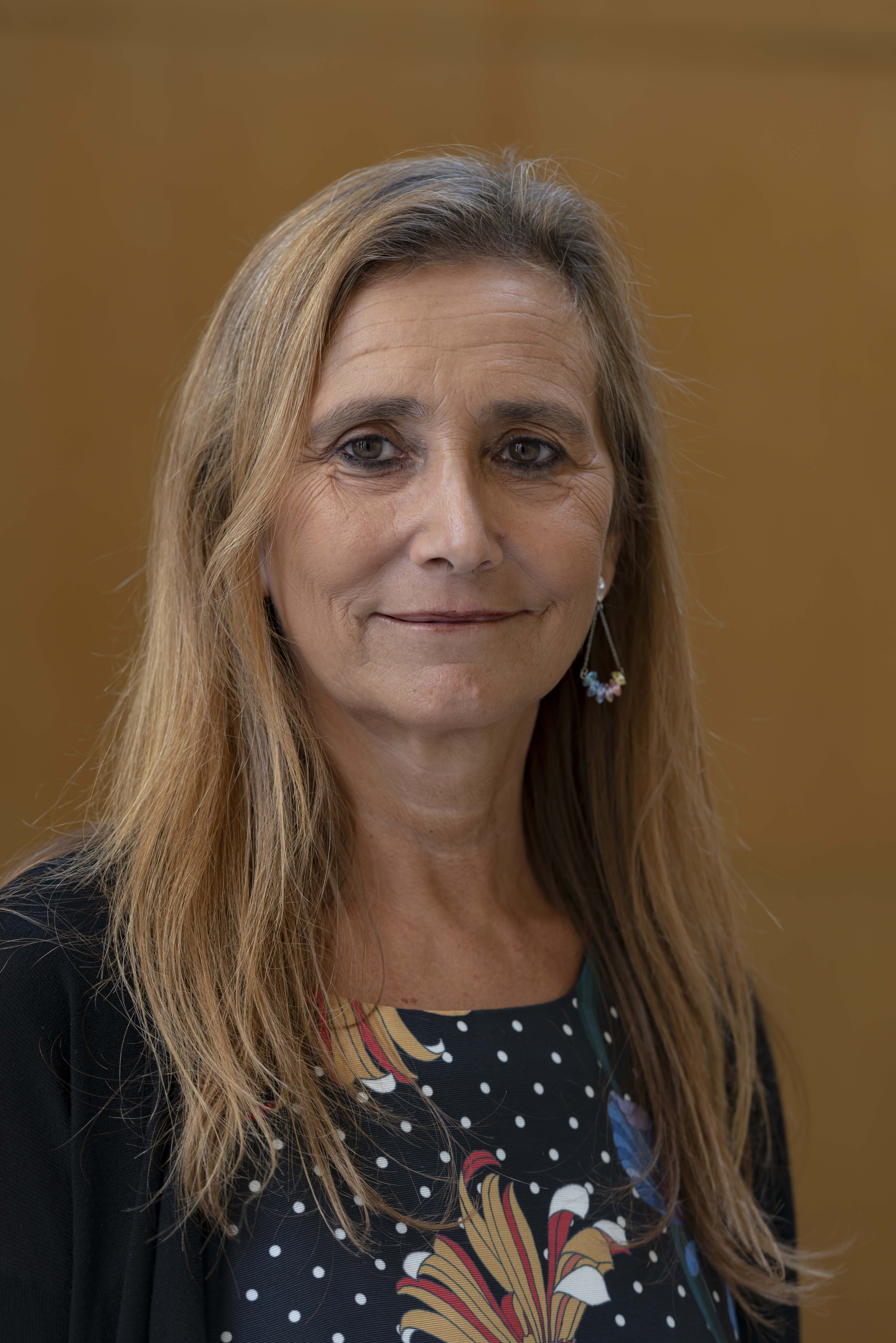
- Born: 1964 (age 61–62); Valencia, Spain
- Education: University of Valencia (Law degree)
- Occupations: Lawyer; businesswoman

Eva Blasco García (born 1964) is a Spanish lawyer and businesswoman linked to the tourism sector and business associationism. She has served as president of the Valencia provincial division of the Confederación Empresarial de la Comunitat Valenciana (CEV) since 2018, becoming the first woman to hold the position in the organisation's history. She is also the CEO of Europa Travel, a Valencia-based travel agency, and since 2025 has served as chair of the World Travel Agents Associations Alliance (WTAAA), the main global alliance of travel agency associations.

== Early life and education ==
Blasco García was born in Valencia in 1964. She graduated in law from the University of Valencia, receiving the Premio Extraordinario (Outstanding Achievement Award) for her graduating class.

== Career ==
=== Public sector and international trade ===
Blasco García began her career at the Department of Industry, Commerce and Tourism of the Generalitat Valenciana, while also practising law and teaching tourism and administrative law at the University of Valencia's tourism studies programme. In 1993, she joined the Instituto Valenciano de Exportación (IVEX) as head of the Far East division. In 1998, she was appointed director of the IVEX office in New York City, a position she held until 2002.

=== Europa Travel ===
In 2003, Blasco García joined Europa Travel, a travel agency founded by her father Vicente Blasco Infante in 1978, as assistant to the presidency and head of marketing. She subsequently became the company's CEO.

=== Business associations ===
==== CEV Valencia ====
In March 2018, Blasco García was elected president of the Valencia provincial council of the Confederación Empresarial de la Comunitat Valenciana (CEV), becoming the first woman to hold this post. She was re-elected in January 2022 and again in November 2025. She also serves as vice president of the CEV at the regional level.

==== ECTAA ====
In 2012, Blasco García was elected vice president of the European Travel Agents' and Tour Operators' Associations (ECTAA), becoming the first Spanish person to hold a vice presidency in the organisation. She was subsequently re-elected and held the position until 2020.

==== WTAAA ====
In November 2025, Blasco García was elected chair of the World Travel Agents Associations Alliance (WTAAA) at its 8th World Summit of Travel Agents held in Jaén. The WTAAA is headquartered in Brussels and represents 12 regional associations across 59 countries, which collectively handle over 70% of global air sales through the agency channel. She was the first Spaniard to lead the organisation.

==== Other positions ====
Between 2016 and 2023, Blasco García served as president of the Asociación de Empresarias y Profesionales de Valencia (EVAP), a businesswomen's association in Valencia. In December 2023, she was elected president of BPW Spain (Federación de Mujeres Empresarias, Directivas y Profesionales de España), a federation representing over 5,000 businesswomen across 15 territorial associations in Spain. She also serves as vice president of international relations of the Confederación Española de Agencias de Viajes (CEAV) and is a member of the Tourism Council of the Generalitat Valenciana.

== Gender equality advocacy ==
Under her leadership at CEV Valencia, women's representation on the organisation's governing board increased significantly. As president of BPW Spain, she has addressed the role of women in the tourism sector at international trade fairs including FITUR.
