= General Confederation of Trade Unions =

International trade union federation

GCTU
- General Confederation of Trade Unions
- Всеобщая Конфедерация Профсоюзов
- Founded: 16 April 1992
- Headquarters: 42, Leninsky Prospekt, 119119, Moscow, Russian Federation
- Location: Russia
- Members: 75 million
- Key people: Mikhail Shmakov, president
- Website: www.vkp.ru

The General Confederation of Trade Unions or GCTU (Russian: Всеобщая Конфедерация Профсоюзов, Vseobshchya Konfederatsya Profsoyuzov or VKP) is an international trade union confederation. It was founded on 16 April 1992 and incorporates members from the Commonwealth of Independent States.

The GCTU claims a membership of 75 million and is led by Mikhail Shmakov as president.

== Member Unions ==
=== National Trade Union Centers ===
The national trade union centers affiliated with the GCTU as of 2009 included:

- Federation of Independent Trade Unions of Russia
- Federation of Trade Unions of Ukraine
- Federation of Trade Unions of Belarus
- National Trade Union Confederation of Moldova
- Georgian Trade Union Confederation
- Confederation of Trade Unions of Armenia
- Azerbaijan Trade Unions Confederation
- Federation of Trade Unions of the Republic of Kazakhstan
- Kyrgyzstan Federation of Trade Unions
- Federation of Independent Trade Unions of Tajikistan

=== Industrial Trade Union Internationals ===
The industrial trade union internationals with the GCTU as of 2009 included:

- International Association of Civil Aviation Workers' Unions
- International Amalgamation of Unions of Automobile and Farm Machinery Workers
- International Organisation of Agro-Industrial Trade Unions
- International Confederation of Atomic Energy Workers' Unions
- International Confederation of Water Transport Workers' Unions
- Trade Union International of Workers in Geology, Geodesy and Cartography
- Federation of Mining and Metallurgical Workers' Unions
- International Trade Union Federation of State and Public Employees
- International Confederation of Railway Workers' and Transport Builders' Unions
- International Trade Union Alliance of Public Utilities, Local Industry and Services Workers
- International Confederation of Health Workers' Unions
- Consultative Council of Cultural Workers' Unions
- Federation of Timber and Related Industries Workers' Unions of the Commonwealth of Independent States
- International Organisation of Metalworkers' Unions
- International Association of Trade Unions of Workers in Scientific Research and Production Co-operatives and Enterprises
- International Confederation of Trade Unions of Workers in the Oil and Gas Industries and Construction Workers in the Oil and Gas Complex
- International Community of Defence Industry Workers' Unions
- International Organisation of Trade Unions of Educational and Scientific Workers. (IOTU "Education & Science")
- Trade Union International of Workers in Radio-electronic Industry
- International Association of Fishing Industry Workers' Unions
- International Organisation of Communications Workers' Unions
- International Confederation of Joint Venture Workers' Unions
- International Confederation of Construction and Building Materials Industry Workers' Unions
- International Association of Textile and Light Industry Workers' Unions
- International Public Organisation "Confederation of Unions of Workers in Commerce, Restaurants, Consumers' Co-operatives and Various Forms of Business"
- International Federation of Transport and Road Construction Workers' Unions
- International Association of Chemical and Allied Workers' Unions
- International Trade Union Association "ELEKTROPROFSOYUZ"("ELECTROUNION")

== See also ==
- World Federation of Trade Unions
