= Trade unions in Armenia =

- National organization(s): CTUA
- Primary legislation: Article 28 of the Armenian Constitution

International Labour Organization
- Armenia is a member of the ILO

Convention ratification
- Freedom of Association: 2 January 2006
- Right to Organise: 12 November 2003

Trade unions in Armenia are afforded the right to organize by the Constitution of Armenia. Armenian workers in most sectors have the right to form and join labor unions and the right to strike is enshrined in Armenia’s constitution.

== History ==
In Armenia, the first trade unions were formed between 1905-1907 in Yerevan, Alexandropol, Kars, and Alaverdi. In 1905, the trade union of home-workers was formed in Yerevan. In 1906, the trade unions of the tanner-workers (Yerevan), the rail-way workers (Alexandropol, Kars), the miners (Alaverdi), the typists, the bakers, and the post-office workers (Yerevan) were formed. In Armenia, the concept of organized trade unions began to be spread on a mass scale in 1921.

On 6 February 1921, in Yerevan, at the first Conference, the Council of trade unions of Armenia was formed and G.Azatyan was elected the first secretary, G.Anesoglyan was elected secretary. In the summer of 1921, provincial trade union bureaus were formed in Alexandropol, Bayazet, Dilizhan, Karaklis, and in Yerevan. In 1921, 16 000 industrial and office workers were affiliated in the trade unions.

The primary trade union centre is the Confederation of Trade Unions of Armenia (CTUA), which is the reconstituted remains of the former Soviet trade union structure. The 18th Congress of the Trade Unions of Armenia (1992) which was attended by 335 delegates and 24 branch republican trade unions signed the Declaration on the foundation of the Confederation of Trade Unions of Armenia. The chairpersons of the respective 24 branch republican trade unions signed the Declaration on the foundation of the Confederation of Trade Unions of Armenia. The Congress approved the fundamental principles of the foundation and the procedures of its activity. On 29 April 1997, the 2nd Congress of the Confederation of Trade Unions of Armenia took place. On 23 November 2012, the 3rd Congress of the Confederation of Trade Unions of Armenia was held. Eduard Tumasyan was reelected Chairman of the CTUA, Boris Kharatyan and Khachik Arakelyan were reelected Deputy Chairmen.

== Legal provisions ==
The Law on Trade Unions and the Labor Code of Armenia regulates trade union rights and obligations, and reinforce their legal status and mode of operation. The Law deals with regulatory issues concerning the formation of trade unions, their activities, relations with public and private bodies, and the protection of members’ rights. The Labor Code also regulates relations between employers and trade union representatives.

Unions which are involved in state run enterprises still benefit from check-off dues, but organization and strike action in the private sector is more subdued, in part because of a lack of protection against reprisals.

== Recent developments ==
Since the 2018 Velvet Revolution, several new labor unions have formed, and government officials and unions have stated that labor unions should be strengthened. There is current opportunity to advance labor rights in Armenia. As government agencies have been creating initiatives in social and labor rights, the government has emphasized its political will to conduct labor reforms, and adopted a law to reinstate authority of the labor inspectorate in July 2021.

On 11 June 2021, an event took place in Yerevan officially launching several European Union supported projects on enhancing labor rights protection in Armenia. The projects aim at enhancing capacity of public administration and civil society organizations to strengthen and expand protection of labor rights and building strategic institutional capacity within the Government towards social protection and labor reforms. The project also aims to enhance the individual, collective, and state mechanisms of labor and social rights protection and their application in Armenia through empowerment of employees and labor unions and advocacy for legislative framework reform.

== See also ==
- Economy of Armenia
- List of trade unions
- Social protection in Armenia
- Trade unions in Europe
