= Confederation of Trade Unions of Armenia =

National trade union center in Armenia

CTUA
- Confederation of Trade Unions of Armenia
- Հայաստանի արհմիությունների կոնֆեդերացիա
- Founded: 1992
- Headquarters: Yerevan
- Location: Armenia
- Members: 208,000
- Key people: Eduard Tumasyan, Chairman
- Affiliations: GCTU
- Website: www.hamk.am

The Confederation of Trade Unions of Armenia (CTUA) (Armenian: Հայաստանի արհմիությունների կոնֆեդերացիա, romanized: Hayastani arhmiut’yunneri konfederats’ia) is a national trade union center of Armenia. It is led by Chairman Eduard Tumasyan.

== About ==
The Confederation was established on 1 October 1992 and currently unites 23 trade union branches, which includes over 730 organizations. As of April 2016, there are approximately 208,000 trade union members (17.4% of all employees).

== International cooperation ==
The Confederation is a full member of the General Confederation of Trade Unions and the International Trade Union Confederation. In addition, Chairman Eduard Tumasyan is a member of the executive committee of the Pan-European Regional Council.

Armenia is a member of the International Labour Organization and has ratified 23 conventions of the ILO. Armenia has also committed itself to adhering to international standards such as Article 11 of the European Convention on Human Rights, which includes the right to form trade unions and guarantees their basic rights.

== See also ==
- List of trade unions
- Trade unions in Armenia
- Trade unions in Europe
