= ATUG =

ATUG may refer to:

- Amalgamated Trade Unions of Georgia
- Autonomous Territorial Unit of Gagauzia, Moldova
