= Trade unions in Azerbaijan =

- National organization(s): ATUC

International Labour Organization
- Azerbaijan is a member of the ILO

Convention ratification
- Freedom of Association: 19 May 1992
- Right to Organise: 19 May 1992

Trade unions in Azerbaijan are governed under the Act on Trade Unions (1994) and the Labour Code (1999). Trade unions may be formed with seven or more members, although those in military service or in management positions may not form unions. The constitution provides for a right to strike, although essential services are excluded from this right. Trade unions are prohibited from carrying out political activities and may not associate with political parties or receive finances from political parties. The International Trade Union Confederation (ITUC) notes, "such a general prohibition is deemed contrary to the principles of freedom of association." The Azerbaijan Trade Union Confederation (ATUC) is the sole national centre.
