= Tajikistan Federation of Trade Unions =

Trade union federation in Tajikistan

TFTU
- Tajikistan Federation of Trade Unions
- Федератсияи Иттифоқҳои Касабаи Тоҷикистон
- Headquarters: Dushanbe, Tajikistan
- Location: Tajikistan
- Members: 1.5 million
- Key people: Murodali Salikhov, president
- Affiliations: GCTU

The Tajikistan Federation of Trade Unions (TFTU), (Russian: Федерация независимых профсоюзов Таджикистана; Tajik: Федератсияи Иттифоқҳои Касабаи Тоҷикистон, ФИКТ) is a national trade union center in Tajikistan. It is the successor to the Soviet trade union system and claims a membership of 1.5 million, although a portion of members are found in many enterprises which are not functioning, due to economic conditions.

The TFTU is affiliated with the General Confederation of Trade Unions.
