= National Trade Union Confederation of Moldova =

CNSM
- National Trade Union Confederation of Moldova
- Confederația Națională a Sindicatelor din Moldova
- Founded: 7 June 2007
- Headquarters: Chişinău
- Members: 350,000
- Key people: Oleg Budza, President
- Affiliations: ITUC, GCTU
- Website: sindicate.md

The National Trade Union Confederation of Moldova (Romanian: Confederația Națională a Sindicatelor din Moldova, CNSM) is the sole national trade union center in the country, consisting of 25 federated members. It was founded in June 2007 as a merger between the Confederation of Trade Unions of the Republic of Moldova (CSRM) and the Confederation of Free Trade Unions Moldova (Solidarity).

== History ==
The CNSM traces its history to the first independent unions of the glasnost period and the emergence of Moldova as an independent republic following the breakup of the Soviet Union in 1991.

In 1990, Soviet law reforms allowed trade unions to act independently. Following the 11th Congress of trade unions of the Moldovan SSR, the Moldovan Federation of Trade Unions (MFTU) was declared independent and became vocal in advocating the right to strike and to defend labour rights and standards. On 28 September 1990, 25 industry unions from the MFTU held their first Congress as an independent organisation. In 1992, the MFTU was renamed the Federation of Independent Trade Unions of Moldova following the end of the Soviet Union. In 1993, the organisation was again change name to the General Federation of Trade Unions of the Republic of Moldova (FGSRM).

In the 1990s the FGSRM struggled to maintain membership - in 1990 the MFTU had 2.15 million members, in January 1999 the FGSRM reported slightly less than 1 million members. The decline was attributed to multiple factors, including the loss of more than 300,000 members in the break-away region of Transdinistr, the disappearance of social services (holidays, education, training) provided by the Federation during the Soviet-period, widespread privatization of state-assets and subsequent losses of employment, anti-union actions of company owners and managers, failures to oppose government measures liberalising the economy and internal conflict between the Federation's leadership and affiliated unions.

== Affiliates ==
- Trade Union Federation of Education and Science of the Republic of Moldova
- National Trade Union Federation of Agriculture and Food (AGROSIND)
- Trade Union Federation Sănătatea
- Trade Union Federation of Public Services Employees (SINDASP)
- Trade Union Federation of Workers from Sphere of Social Service and Manufacture of Goods (SINDINDCOMSERVICE)
- Trade Union Federation of Communication Workers
- Trade Union Federation of Culture Workers
- Trade Union Federation from Moldova (SINDLEX)
- Trade Union Federation of Energy Workers of Moldova
- Trade Union Federation of Constructions and Building Materials Industry (SINDICONS)
- Trade Union Federation of Railway Men of Moldova
- Trade Union Federation of Chemical Industry and Energy Resources Workers
- Trade Union Federation of Workers in Banking and Insurance Institutions
- Trade Union Federation in the Field of Consumers' Cooperative, Trade and Business (MOLDSINDCOOPCOMERT)
- Trade Union Federation of Workers from Light Industry
- Trade Union Federation of Air Transport (SINDTRANSAERO)
- Trade Union Federation of Machine and Devices Building and Vocational Education (SINDRAUTMAS)
- Trade Union Federation of Transport and Road Workers
- Trade Union Federation "Moldova-business-sind"
- Trade Union Federation from Forestry (SINDSILVA)
- Trade Union Federation of Energy and Industry
- Trade Union Federation of Workers from Cadaster, Geology and Geodesy (SINDGEOCAD)
- Trade Union of Workers of Trade, Public Catering, Consumers Cooperative, Services, Restaurants and Hotels (SindLUCAS)
- Trade Union of Workers from Building Automobile and Agricultural Machinery Industry
- Trade Union of Workers from Forestry and Environmental Protection Branches
