= Jeyranbatan Ultrafiltration Water Treatment Plants Complex =

Water filtration plant in Azerbaijan

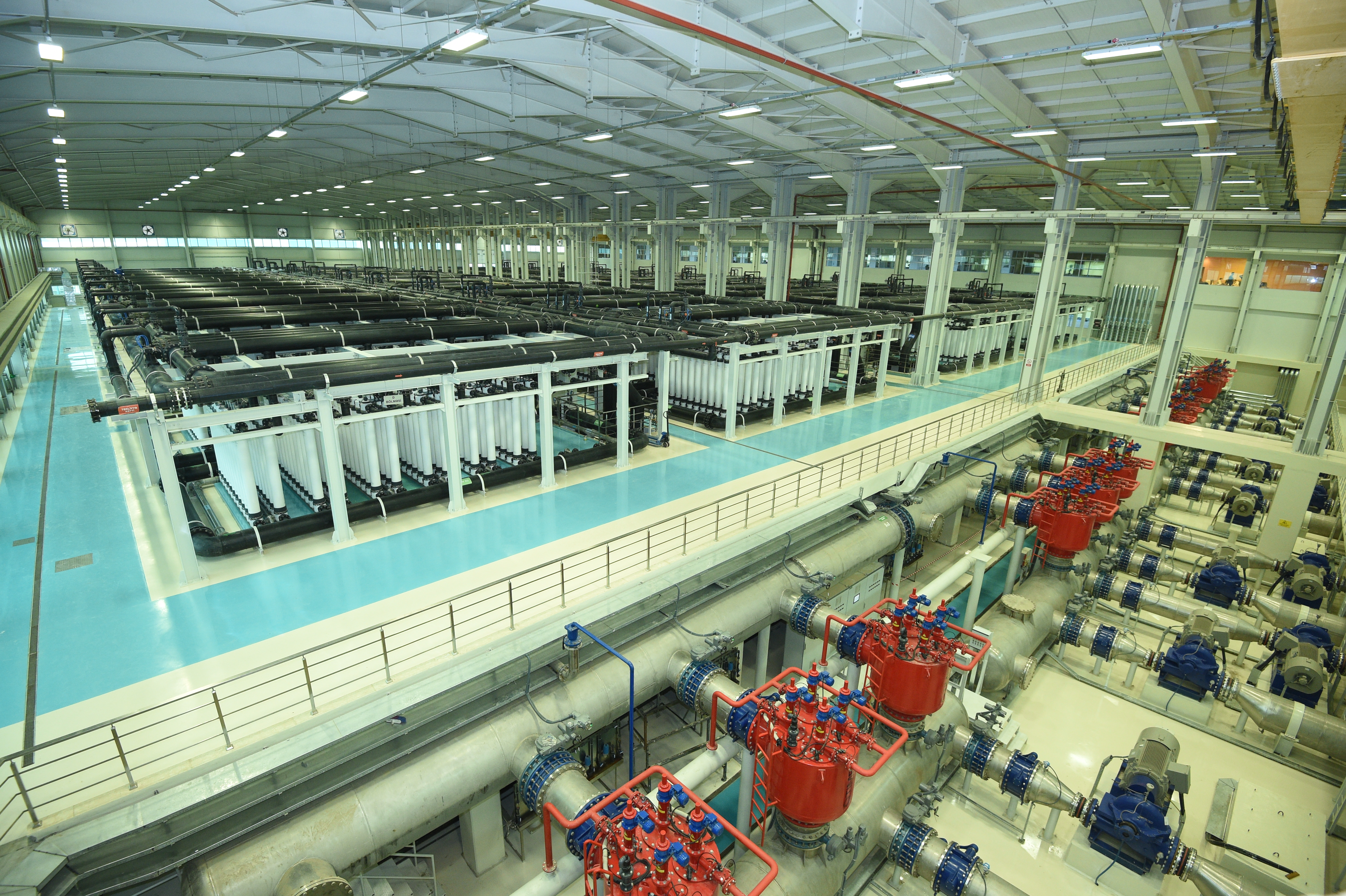
Jeyranbatan Ultra Filtration Water Treatment Plant

The Jeyranbatan Ultrafiltration Water Treatment Plants Complex is a water filtration plant in Baku, Azerbaijan. The plant, designed to supply Baku and the Absheron Peninsula with drinking water, was put into operation on 28 October 2015. The capacity of the ultrafiltration (UF) plant is 6.6 cubic meters of water per second (570,000 cubic meters per day). The plant complex was chosen as one of the most important water projects in the world at the Global Water Summit in Abu Dhabi in 2016. Companies from the United States, Germany, Switzerland, Spain, Italy, Turkey and the Republic of Korea as well as up to thirty local contractor organizations were involved in the construction of the complex.

== Treatment technology ==
The UF treatment plant processes water which is naturally purified in the Jeyranbatan reservoir, which has a capacity of 186 million cubic meters. The raw water is first treated in the coarse screen building by using 3000-micron automatic self-cleaning filters. It then passes through 200-micron filters followed by 0.02-micron filter modules. This process is performed in a mechanically closed environment, without using chemical treatment. As such, the natural mineral content of the water is fully preserved. Water produced in the plant meets the standards set by the World Health Organization and other international organizations.

Some quality indicators of water processed in the filters (chlorine residue, cloudiness, pH, TOC) are controlled digitally. Other parameters of raw and treated water are studied in the laboratory of the complex. The volume and water pressure, each stage of processing, and the storage and transportation processes are fully automated. All technological processes are managed in the SCADA control center.

Processed water is collected in the treated water tank, which has a capacity of 10,000 cubic meters. It is then pumped to the Absheron reservoir, which is located at 118 meters above sea level, and water is distributed to the networks by gravity.

The Jeyranbatan-Zira transmission main (with a total length of 83.5 kilometers) is served by the Saray, Balakhani, Ramana, Gala, and Zira reservoirs (with a total capacity of 90,000 cubic meters) which are located along its route. They were constructed in order to provide water to Baku and other residential areas. More than a million inhabitants of the peninsula have been provided with high quality and sustainable drinking water by this infrastructure.

== Structure ==
Intake pipelines were constructed for taking water from the reservoir by applying the tunnel boring machine method. A water distribution chamber was built on the shore of the reservoir in order to control volume of the supplied water and adjust raw water capacity to meet the needs of the plants. Four pipelines with a diameter of 1.4 meters were laid from the water distribution chamber to the UF treatment plant.

30 km of pipelines in a varied diameter range, 242 km of electrical and 13 km of fiber optic cables, 7,120 tons of rebar, 3,000 tons of steel structure, and 65,000 cubic meters of concrete were used during the construction of the complex. Approximately 700,000 cubic meters of earthworks were constructed, 19,500 square meters of area were covered with asphalt, and greenery work was carried out in an area of 28,000 square meters.

== Gallery ==
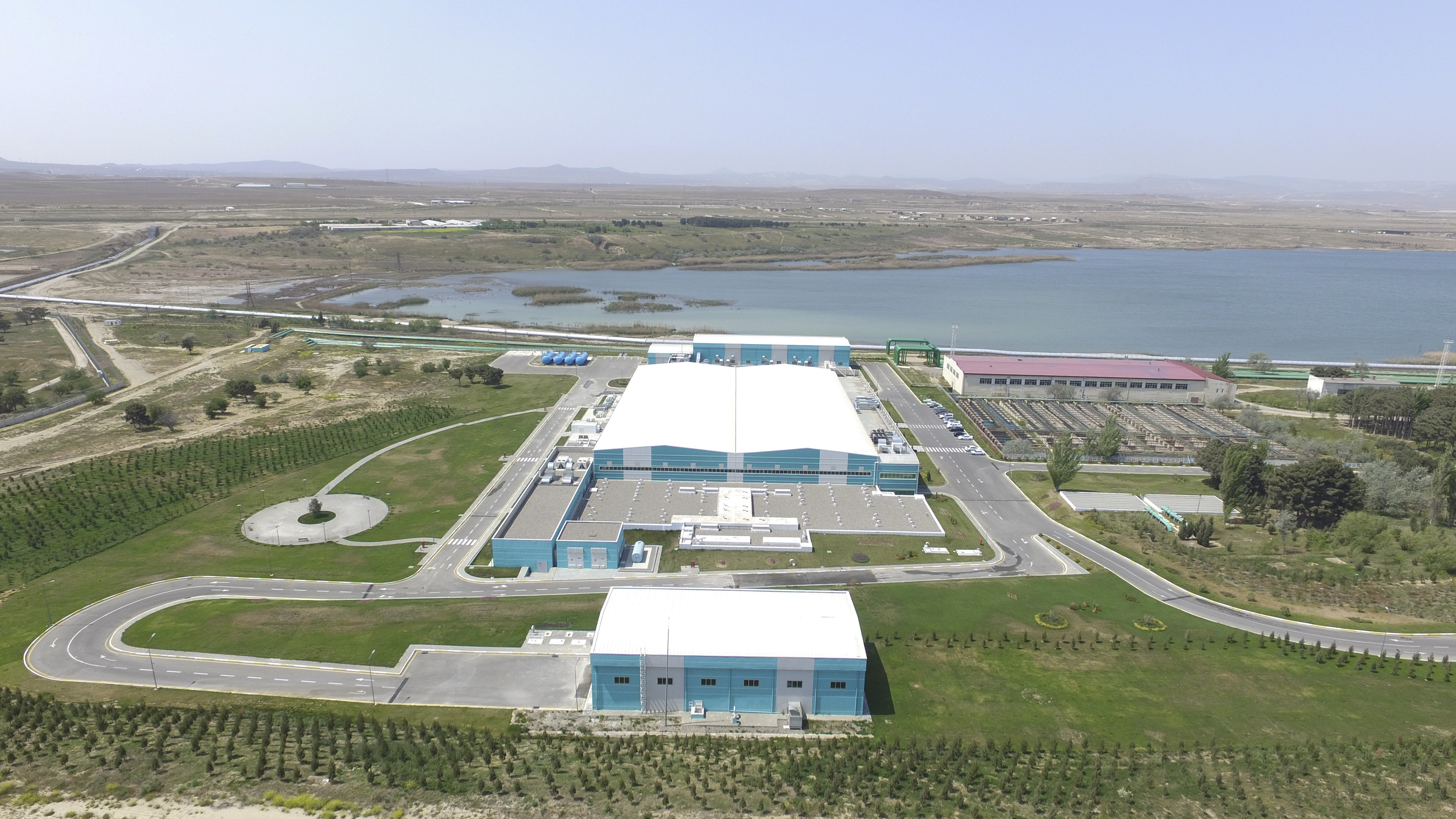

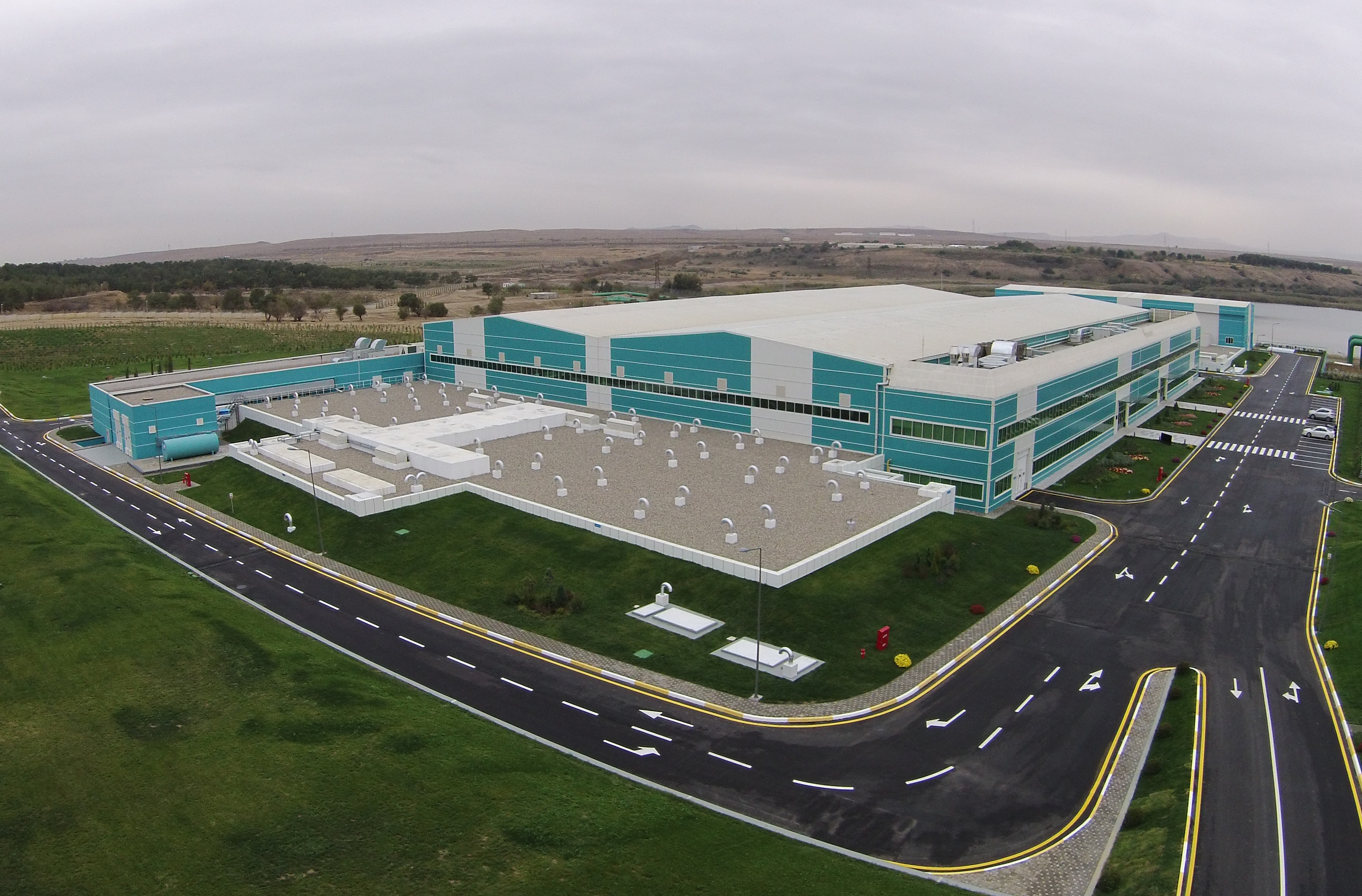

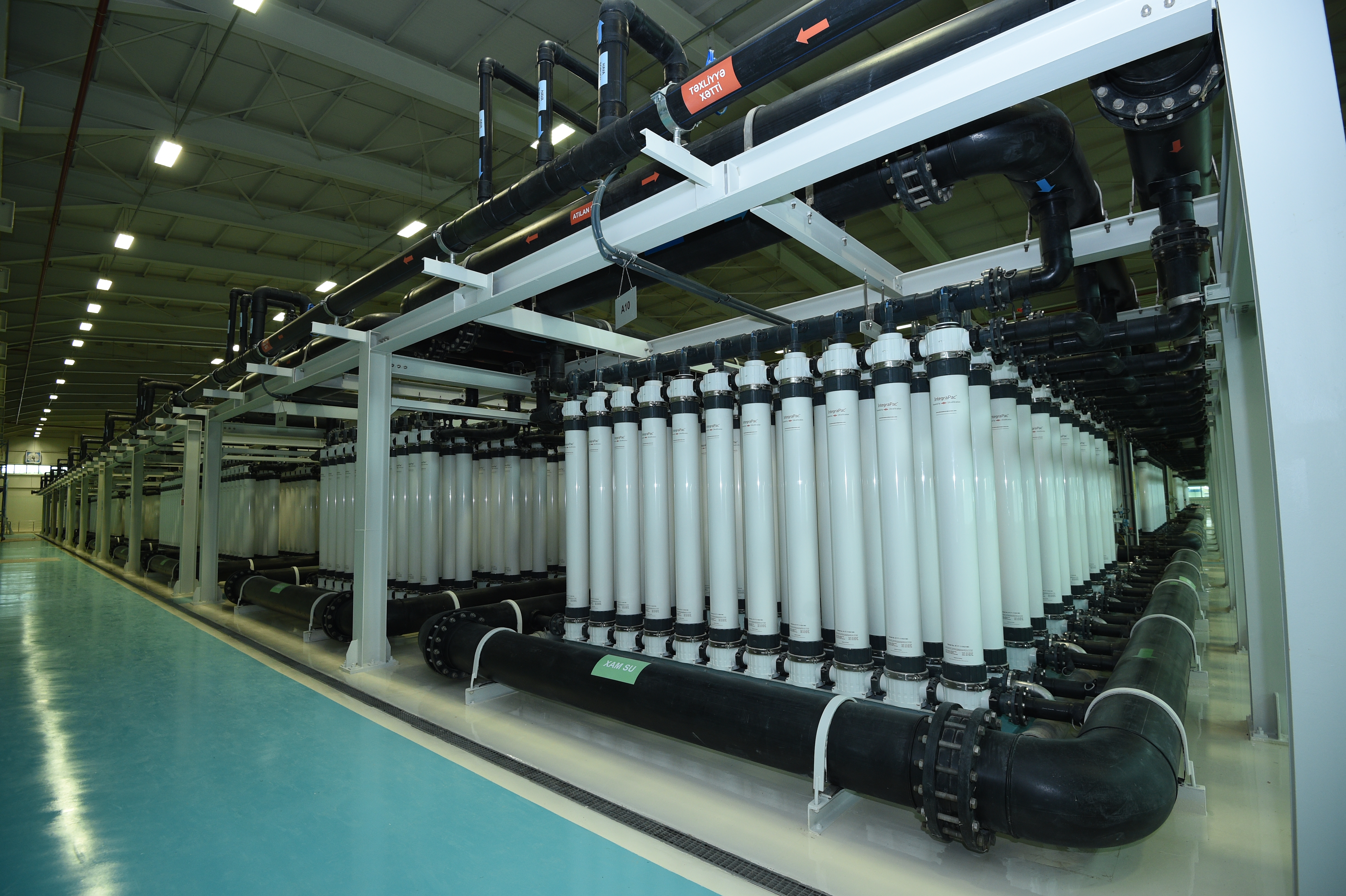

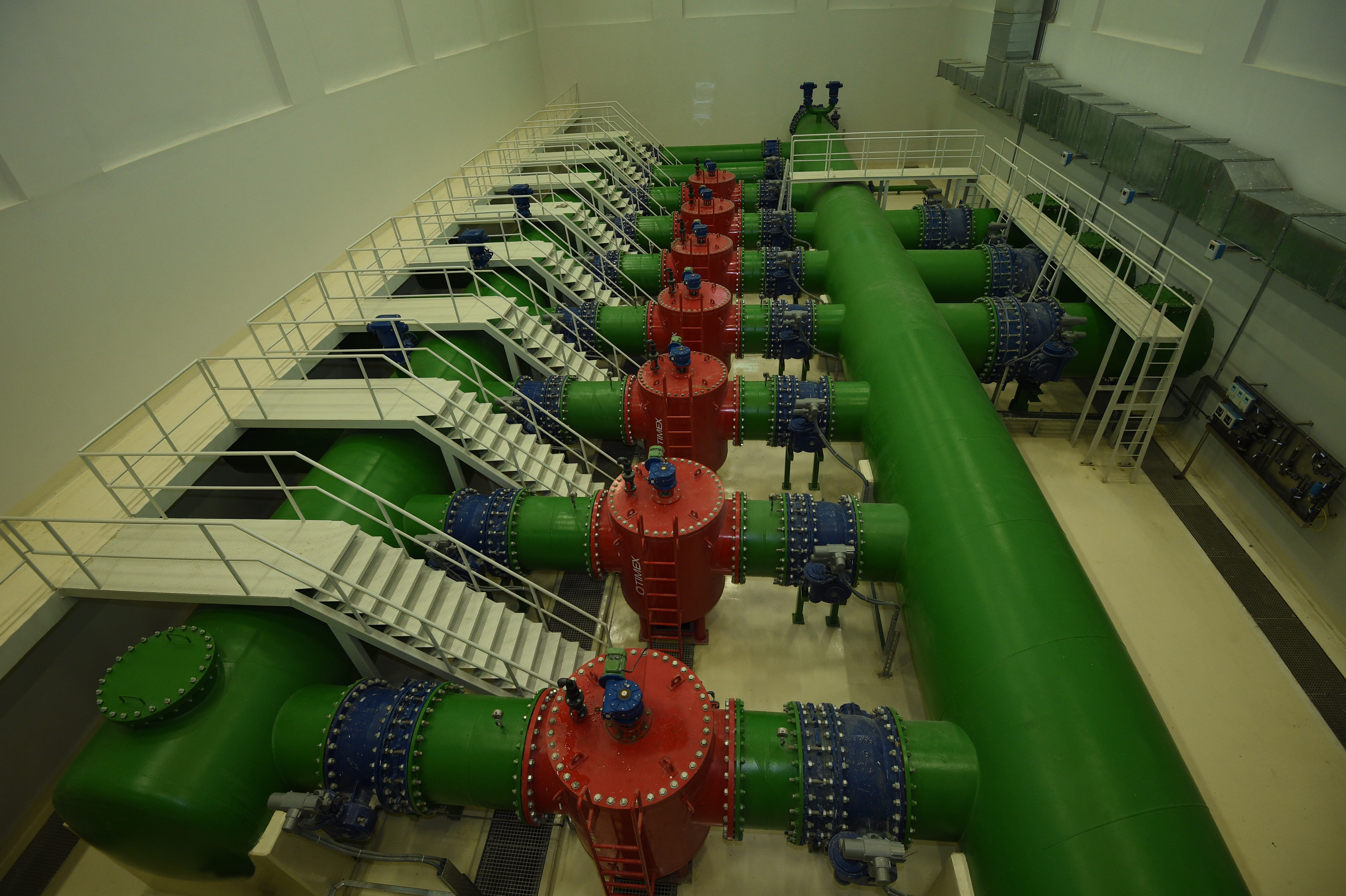

== See also ==
- Azersu Open Joint Stock Company
