= Confederation of Trade Unions =

Confederation of Trade Unions may mean:

- Confederation of Trade Unions (Albania)
- Hong Kong Confederation of Trade Unions
- Norwegian Confederation of Trade Unions
