= Family Tracing Unit (Sri Lanka) =

The Family Tracing Unit (FTU) is a unit that in December 2009 was jointly set up by the government of Sri Lanka and UNICEF. The FTU is based in Vavuniya. Its aim is to reunify children with their families following the Sri Lankan Civil War. As of September 2011, the FTU has received 690 applications from families looking for their missing children, of whom 490 were LTTE conscripts. However, only 29 children have been reunited with their families.

== See also ==
- The international tracing unit
