= Water supply and sanitation in Azerbaijan =

Overview of Azerbaijan's water supply and sanitation infrastructure

National Policy Dialogues on Integrated Water Resources Management in Azerbaijan for managing water resources are aimed at developing a state strategy based on "Convention on the Protection and Use of Transboundary Watercourses and International Lakes" of United Nations Economic Commission for Europe and European Union Water Framework Directive and the "Water and Health" Protocol of that convention as well as other principles of the United Nations and the EU.

Documents, directives and other acts of the EU, the United Nations Economic Commission for Europe, the United Nations Environment Programme, the Global Water Partnership, as well as other international organizations were used in the preparation of strategy. It was taken into account most international water legislation requirements.

== History ==
In the late 80s and early, there was a serious problem in the water supply system in Azerbaijan. After the gaining of independence, the main task of government was to eliminate the difficulties in the water supply system as well as in many areas of the economy. First of all, the establishment of an organization that could improve the drinking water supply of residential settlements in Baku, Sumgayit and Absheron peninsula began. So, the Absheron Regional Joint Stock Water Company was created in 1995, under the decision of the National Assembly of Azerbaijan based on the main and circulating assets of the two former state-owned enterprises - "Kommunsenayesutehjizaty" Production Association and "AzSuGEO" Scientific-Research Institute.

At that period of time, for the first time among the CIS, a loan was granted to the water sector by international financial institutions for the "Greater Baku Water Supply Rehabilitation Project" and this project was successfully implemented.

== Azersu Open Joint Stock Company ==
Azersu Open Joint Stock Company is in charge of policy and strategy for the water supply and sanitation services in Azerbaijan. The Company makes necessary arrangements for extraction of water from sources followed by treatment, transportation, and sales and takes necessary actions for wastewater treatment. Azersu OJSC engages in the design, construction, operation, and maintenance of intake structures, reservoirs, pumping stations, water pipelines and sewerage collectors.

The Chairman of Azersu OJSC is Gorkhmaz Huseynov since 2011. First Deputy Chairman is Teyyub Jabbarov, Deputies Chairman are Kocharli Hasanov, Seymur Seyidov, and Ilgar Taghiyev. The number of employees of "Azersu" OJSC is 12500 according to status data as 1 January 2018.

== Drinking water supply ==
In 2004, the repartition of water resources in Azerbaijan was as follows: 30% rivers, 40% lakes, 20% reservoirs and the rest between springs and groundwater. According to the Food and Agriculture Organization of the United Nations (FAO), in 2008 7% of the consumed water in Azerbaidjan was coming from underground sources.

Mingachevir reservoir of the Kura river is used as a source of drinking water by the population.

=== Reservoirs ===
==== Mingachevir reservoir ====
This Mingachevir water reservoir was created on the Kura river. The construction of the Mingachevir reservoir and the Hydroelectric Power Station was completed in 1953. The total capacity of the reservoir at the normal level (83 m) is 15730 mln m^{3}, useful volume of it is 8210 mln m3. The area of the reservoir is 605 km^{2}, the volume is 16.1 km^{3}, the length is 70 km, the maximum width is 18 km, the average depth is 26 m, the deepest is 75 m.

==== Jeyranbatan reservoir ====
Jeyranbatan water reservoir was established in 1955 due to increasing demand for drinking and technical water in Baku and Sumgayit. The capacity of the reservoir is 186 million m^{3}, the useful volume is 150 mln m^{3}. The length of the reservoir is 8.74 km, the maximum width is 2.15 km, the length of the coastline is 23.3 km, the maximum depth is 28.5 meters.

== Sanitation ==
In the sewerage sector, Baku wastewater network serves 72% population of the city, but only 50% of the water is treated. 90% of the treated water is biologically processed and only 10% is mechanically processed. Wastewater treatment plants are available in 16 cities and regions; most of them are partially or completely useless. In most cases, the quality of water supplied to the population does not meet the required standards. The state works with donor communities to take the necessary measures to address these problems. The Azerbaijani government has adopted a program on the construction of water supply and sewage systems in more than 60 small towns (regional centers) in the country. The state has already started to implement more than 20 such projects. At the same time, local water supply projects are being implemented.

== "Small Towns Water Supply and Sanitation Sector Project" ==
The Loan agreement between the Government of Azerbaijan and the Japan International Cooperation Agency on the "Small Towns Water Supply and Sanitation Sector Project" was signed on 29 May 2009 and entered into force on 30 June 2009. The project covers rehabilitation of water supply and sanitation systems in Gusar, Khachmaz, Khizi, Gobustan and Naftalan.

=== Gusar City ===
"The project on rehabilitation of water supply and sanitation system of Gusar town" has been calculated to improve drinking water and sanitation services of 19,600 people in Gusar city, taking into account perspective development until 2030. Within the project, drinking water supply will be improved in 12,000 people living in Balakusar, Hasanqala, Old Khudat, Chilagir, Yukhari Layar, Gayakend, Khuray villages of Gusar region and Chartepe, Orta Khuch, Ashagi Khuch villages of Guba region.

Construction and installation works on the project started on April 19, 2012. At the first stage of the project, a drainage water facility with a capacity of 102 liters per day or 8800 cubic meters per day was constructed in Gusarchay river to provide Gusar and its surrounding villages with drinking water. At the same time, three water reservoirs with a total capacity of 1,000 cubic meters, a 2.8 km long inter-reservoir water line and a new water chlorinating building were constructed.

=== Khachmaz City ===
Implementation of the project on rehabilitation of drinking water supply and sanitation systems of Khachmaz city started on 19 April 2012. The project has been calculated to improve drinking water and sanitation services of 47,000 people in Khachmaz, the water supply of 11,000 people in Qobuqyagi, Armudpadar, Garaychi, Garagurdlu and Old Khachmaz villages of the region.

In the first stage of the project, the Uchkun spring, (which is the main water source of the city) was rehabilitated, 2 km long trunk water line (400 mm) was constructed, 2 reservoirs with a total capacity of 10,000 cubic meters were built and 1,6 km water line between these reservoirs was constructed.

=== Khizi City ===
Construction and installation works on the project started in 2012 and at the first stage of the project, water intake facilities were built in Gars (430 cubic meters / day) and Yeddibulag (40 cubic meters / day) resources, and an 8.4 km long trunk water line was constructed in Khizi.

=== Naftalan city ===
Implementation of the project for reconstruction of drinking water supply and sewerage system of Naftalan city started in early 2013.

=== Gobustan City ===
A groundbreaking ceremony for reconstruction of Gobustan drinking water supply and sanitation system was held on May 10, 2015.

== Water use ==
According to FAO's report, the major part of the water in Azerbaijan is used for agriculture and livestock (77%), the rest is shared between industry (19%) and municipalities (4%) as of 2005.

== "Second National Water Supply and Sanitation Services" project ==
Financing agreement on the project "Second National Water Supply and Sanitation Services" have been signed between Azerbaijan and World Bank on September 5, 2008.

Within the project, reconstruction of water supply and sanitation systems and facilities in 21 regions of the country (Devechi, Dashkasan, Gadabay, Imishli, Kurdamir, Siyazan, Agsu, Ismayilli, Ujar, Zardab, Lankaran, Masalli, Astara, Jalilabad, Yardimli, Lerik and also in 5 districts of Nakhchivan Autonomous Republic - Julfa, Ordubad, Sadarak, Kangarli, Shahbuz) was planned.

The total cost of the project is $410.0 million. $260.0 million of this amount was financed by loans from the International Bank for Reconstruction and Development (IBRD) and the International Development Association, and US$150.0 million was funded by the Government of Azerbaijan.

== See also ==
- Utilities in Azerbaijan
- Jeyranbatan Ultrafiltration Water Treatment Plants Complex
- Jeyranbatan reservoir
- Azersu Open Joint Stock Company
