= The International Tracing Unit =

Service to locate loved ones separated by conflict or natural distaster

The International Tracing Unit works within the framework of Magen David Adom, as part of the International Tracing Service of the Red Cross. The purpose of this unit is to trace members of family and friends who were separated at times such as escaping from massacres of their people, the Holocaust, natural emigration and natural disasters.

In 1949, The State of Israel signed the Geneva Convention, and thereby committed itself to set up a service for finding relatives. The service deals with requests to trace relatives with whom all contact has been lost as a result of wars or natural disasters. The International Tracing Unit of Magen David Adom is available to all Israeli citizens as part of the services given by the national organisation, which is the equivalent of the Red Cross in other countries. In the last few years the contact between the Red Cross and Red Crescent movement and MDA has strengthened. Especially since MDA joined the ranks of the International Red Cross and Red Crescent organisation. Within this framework the activities of the Tracing Unit in MDA were renewed, with organisational, logistic and financial support from the ICRC with the purpose of joining MDA into the international activities of the organisation. During the years 2002-2007 the International Tracing Unit dealt with more than 5000 requests.

In the search for information, the International Tracing unit contacts museums, archives, different organizations and national branches of the Red Cross in various countries all over the world.

In cases where the request has come from another country, the International Tracing unit works to help find someone using information found in Israel.

In a small but significant number of cases, the International Tracing unit has discovered that the missing person is still alive. Members of family have been reunited after tens of years of searching.

In more than 1,700 incidents, confirmation is received of the death or expulsion of the missing person from different countries. A confirmation of death plays an important part in the process of grieving and closing the circle.

After a number of successful traces it was decided in MDA to set up the department as a tracing unit, and the first course of its kind in the world was held to train people to carry out the tracing. The course took place in October 2008 in Jerusalem, and 15 people, MDA workers and volunteers, received the appropriate training to carry out tracing. The course took place in cooperation with representatives of the Red Cross.

== Compensation, support and pension ==
Magen David Adom in Israel can help fill in the forms connected with forced labour, enslavement, forceful removal from areas of the former USSR or imprisonment in concentration camps, forms needed to request compensation.

== See also ==
- International Tracing Service
- Family Tracing Unit (Sri Lanka)
