= Kyrgyzstan Federation of Trade Unions =

KFTU
- Kyrgyzstan Federation of Trade Unions
- Headquarters: Bishkek, Kyrgyzstan
- Location: Kyrgyzstan
- Members: 980,400 (2001)
- Key people: Sagyn Bozgunbayev, president
- Affiliations: GCTU
- Website: http://www.fpk.kg

The Kyrgyzstan Federation of Trade Unions (KFTU), also known as the Federation of Trade Unions of Kyrgyzstan (FTUK) is the national trade union center of Kyrgyzstan. Most trade unions in the country are affiliated to the KFTU.

The KFTU is affiliated with the General Confederation of Trade Unions.
