= Federation of Independent Trade Unions of Russia =

Trade union centre in Russia

FNPR/FITUR
- Federation of Independent Trade Unions of Russia
- Федерация Независимых Профсоюзов России
- Founded: 1990
- Headquarters: Moscow, Russia
- Location: Russia
- Members: 31.5 million (2002)
- Key people: Sergei Chernogayev, chairman
- Affiliations: GCTU; Formerly; ITUC (2000-2022)
- Website: www.fnpr.ru

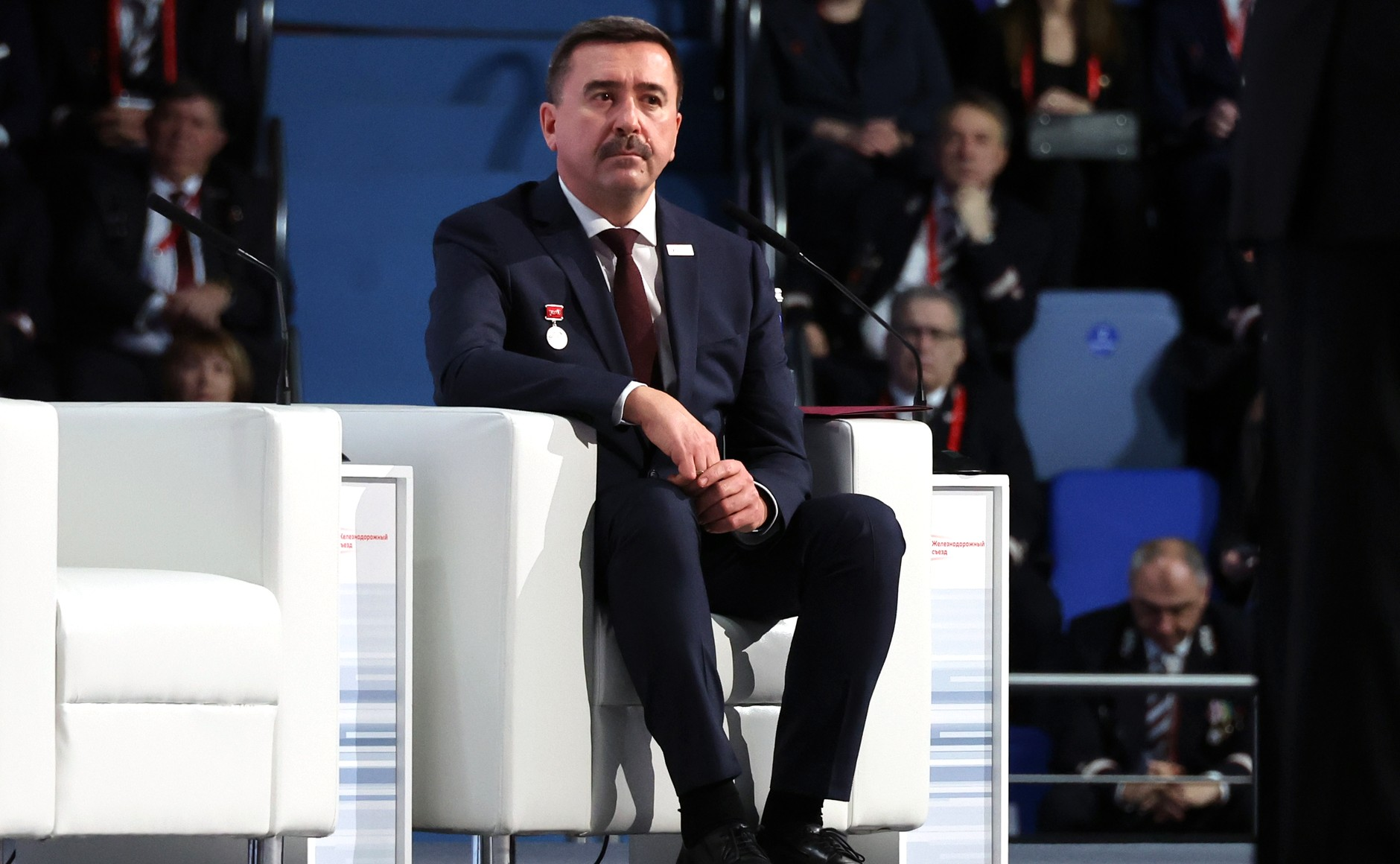
Chairman of the FNPR since 2024, Sergei Chernogayev

The Federation of Independent Trade Unions of Russia (Russian: Федерация Независимых Профсоюзов России, ФНПР, romanized: Federatsiya Nezavisimykh Profsoyuzov Rossii, FNPR) is the largest post-Soviet national trade union center in Russia, with a membership estimated between 28 and 31.5 million (down from 70 million at its formation). The FNPR is widely recognized as the de facto successor to the Soviet-era trade unions system, although the General Confederation of Trade Unions (GFTC), as the umbrella organization of trade unions in the former Soviet republics, is technically the equivalent of the former. The FNPR is closely affiliated with ruling United Russia party and is notable for fraudulent activity with real estate property it had inherited following the dissolution of the Soviet Union.

In February 2022, the FNPR supported the Russian invasion of Ukraine. Because of this, the FNPR was expelled by the International Trade Union Confederation (ITUC).

== History ==
=== 1990s ===
The FNPR was established in 1990, one year before the dissolution of the Union of Soviet Socialist Republics. After the breakup, excepting military, the FNPR was one of the few national institutions to retain its power and functions. These abilities included control over the disbursement of social insurance funds, the right to contest and veto dismissal of workers, and automatic deductions, or check-offs, from employee wages.

The FNPR continued to operate in a manner similar to soviet era unions. Members included both workers and management, and often labour unrest was aimed at the government, rather than employers, in an effort to preserve the command economy, as opposed to a free market system.

Boris Yeltsin, former President of Russia, set up the Tripartite Commission for the Regulation of Social and Labour Relations in 1992. The FNPR was given 9 of the 14 labour seats on the board, and the government soon recognized the union as its primary social partner, elevating its status against that of other trade unions.

During the Russian political crisis of October 3, 1993 the FNPR, under the leadership of Igor Klochkov, called for the defense of the Russian White House in support of Aleksandr Rutskoy and the illegally dissolved Supreme Soviet of Russia and Congress of Soviets. There was little response from workers to this call, and the consequences for the union were swift. Having passed a motion of their support for Rutskoy on September 28, Yeltsin passed a presidential decree the same day - stripping the union of its right to control and dispense social insurance funds and other benefits. Following Yeltin's victory in the White House showdown, further threats to end mandatory wage check-offs resulted in the hurried removal of Klochkov from leadership. He was replaced on October 11, by Mikhail Shmakov, who has maintained the post through to the present date.

Although the control of the Social Insurance fund was placed with the Labour Ministry, in reality there was little change to the administration.

In 1998, Russia was hit by a severe financial crisis, and the FNPR was again at odds with Yeltsin, calling for his resignation in an open letter. The union preferred Yevgeny Primakov, the dismissed prime minister, and the Otechestvo coalition. However, this support appears to have been relatively weak, as regional trade unions had their own positions and interests, and it was Vladimir Putin who was appointed prime minister, and then acting president, four months later.

=== 2000s ===
In 2001, a new labour code was introduced in the State Duma. It was strongly opposed by all but one of the trade unions. As well, in a July 9 speech to the Federal Assembly, Putin stated that there was no longer a need for the Trade Unions to perform state functions such as the distribution of social benefits.

=== 2010s ===
==== Pension reform controversy ====
In June 2018, the Russian cabinet denied access to Mikhail Shmakov, the head (chairman) of the FNPR to a meeting it was holding between its officials and replaced him by deputy who at the time was known to be a member of the ruling United Russia party. Earlier he had criticized government's decision to sign pension bill into law. Previously, the head of the Union used to be routinely invited to attend such meetings for almost every 25 years. Tatyana Golikova denied all allegations saying that the cabinet "didn't make any discriminating decisions". It was also said that the FNPR's was assumed to arrange fake protests in order to "deflate" people's anger over upcoming pension law changes.

=== 2020s ===
In the 2020s, the FNPR supported the Russian invasion of Ukraine: this caused tensions within the International Trade Union Confederation (ITUC), with several unions calling for FNPR's suspension. In April 2022 FNPR withdrew from ITUC.

Its Chairman since 29 October 2024 is Sergei Chernogayev, a Vorkuta native.

== Relations with other trade unions ==
=== AFL–CIO ===
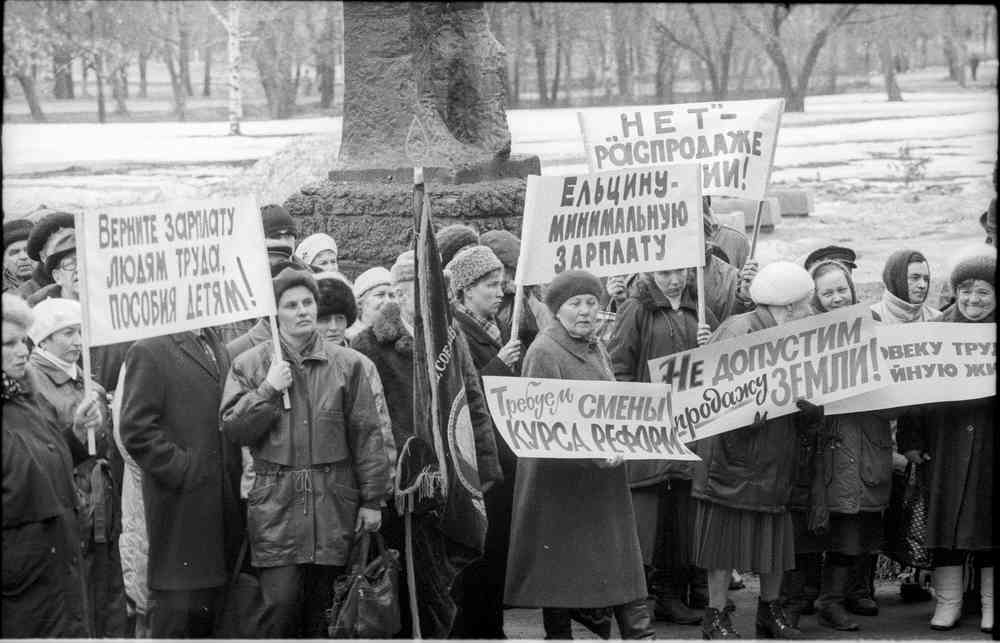
The all-Russia protest meeting held by trade unions in 1998

When tensions between the USSR and the United States grew there was a considerable level of suspicion directed by western trade unions toward the FNPR. The AFL–CIO, through its Free Trade Union Institute, operated within Russia, running programs to support independent unions that were opposed to the FNPR. These programs wound down with a change of leadership in the AFL–CIO in 1995, and in 1997, Shmakov was invited to attend the AFL–CIO congress.

=== ITUC ===
The FNPR was granted observer status in the International Confederation of Free Trade Unions (now the International Trade Union Confederation) in April, 2000, and was accepted as an affiliated member in November of the same year. Since affiliation the FNPR has been active in supporting ITUC in the area, providing facilities for an ITUC regional office.

In 2022, the FNPR withdrew from ITUC. The FNPR has repeatedly reiterated its strong support for the invasion of Ukraine. This was impossible to reconcile with the ITUC's principled support for democracy, human rights and peace, and several unions called for a suspension of FNPR.
