= Georgian Trade Union Confederation =

GTUC
- Georgian Trade Unions Confederation
- საქართველოს პროფესიული კავშირების გაერთიანება
- Founded: 1991
- Headquarters: Tbilisi, Georgia
- Location: Georgia
- Members: 220,000 (21 member unions)
- Key people: Irakli Petriashvili, president;
- Affiliations: ITUC
- Website: gtuc.ge

Georgian Trade Union Confederation (GTUC) is an independent non-profit making organization. GTUC is the most rapidly developing trade union organisations in the South Caucasus, which works in close co-operation with its domestic and international partners. Almost 45% of all employees in the country are members of trades unions. GTUC offers trainings in labour law and organising, as well as providing legal protection to its members.

The goals of GTUC are to promote:
• Formation and development of social and democratic state;
• Strengthen and free development of the international trade union movement;
• European integration;
• Protection of gender equality;
• Protection of basic human democratic rights and independence of trade unions;
• Establishment of healthy labour market competition;
• Creation of a free non-discrimination environment and the promotion of a social climate of employment in the country;
• Activities of woman and youth organizations;

The task of GTUC:
• Formation of national and international economic policy;
• Formation of social, health care and international and national environmental policy and strengthen policy of employment, labour market, prices and consumer market;
• Elaboration of labour, social and other legislation relevant legislations;
• Formation of possibilities of education and cultural policy at the national and international levels;

GTUC has carried and continues to concentrate on the following activities:
• Legislative work, being an author of several drafts;
• Free legal protection of employees; representing them at all national court levels;
• Implementing analyses of social-economic and labour general state in the country;
• Promoting the process of collective negotiations and conclusions of collective agreements;
• Organizing of workers’ strikes, manifestations and demonstrations;
• Representing trade unions in the international arena;

The GTUC is affiliated with the International Trade Union Confederation.
