= Trade unions in Europe =

European Trade Union Confederation

The European Trade Union Confederation was set up in 1973 to promote the interests of working people at the European level and to represent them in the European Union institutions. It is recognized by the European Union, the Council of Europe, and the European Free Trade Association as the only representative cross-sectoral trade union organization at the European level.

Some countries, such as Germany, Austria, Belgium, Sweden, Finland, and the other Nordic countries, have strong, centralized unions, where every type of industry has a specific union, which are then gathered in large national union confederations. The largest union confederation in Europe is the German Confederation of Trade Unions. Usually there are at least two national union confederations, one for academically educated and one for branches with lower education level. The largest Swedish union confederation is the blue-collar Swedish Trade Union Confederation (Landsorganisationen, or LO). The LO has about 1.5 million members (including pensioners), which is a sixth of Sweden's population (Swedish blue-collar density in 2000 was 83% and in 2019 60%; the total density of blue-collar + white-collar employees in 2019 was 68%). Finland's equivalent is the Central Organisation of Finnish Trade Unions, with about one million members out of the country's 5.2 million inhabitants. In addition, there are two other Finnish union confederations for more educated workers, with combined membership of approximately one million. In Denmark union density in 2015 was 68%.

In comparison, France has one of the lowest union densities in Europe, with only about 10% of the workers belonging to unions. Generally, several unions are represented inside large companies or administrations, normally with one from each of the main national confederation of unions and possibly independent unions. Union membership, however, tends to be concentrated in some specific areas, especially the public sector. Unions in some sectors, such as public transportation (e.g. SNCF and RATP), are likely to enter well-publicized strikes.
