= New Zealand =

Island country in the Pacific Ocean

New Zealand Aotearoa (Māori)
- Flag Coat of arms
- Anthems: God Defend New Zealand (Māori: Aotearoa) God Save the King (Note: "God Save the King" is officially one of New Zealand's two national anthems, but is usually reserved for situations relevant to the monarchy.) (Māori: Me tohu e te Atua)
- Location of New Zealand, including outlying islands, its territorial claim in the Antarctic, and Tokelau
- Capital: Wellington; 41°18′S 174°47′E
- Largest city: Auckland; 36°52′S 174°45′E
- Official languages: English (Note: De facto official until 2026; see English Language Act 2026); Māori; NZ Sign Language
- Ethnic groups (2023) (Note: Ethnicity figures add to more than 100% as people could choose more than one ethnic group in the census.): 67.8% European; 17.8% Māori; 17.3% Asian; 8.9% Pacific peoples; 1.9% ME/LA/African; 1.1% other
- Religion (2023): 51.6% no religion; 32.3% Christianity (Note: Excluding the Māori-based churches of Rātana and Ringatū); 2.9% Hinduism; 6.3% other; 6.9% undeclared
- Demonyms: New Zealander; Kiwi (colloquial); Aotearoan (rare)
- Government: Unitary parliamentary constitutional monarchy
  - Monarch: Charles III
  - Governor-General: Cindy Kiro
  - Prime Minister: Christopher Luxon
- Legislature: Parliament

independence from the United Kingdom
  - Treaty of Waitangi: 6 February 1840
  - Responsible government: 7 May 1856
  - Dominion: 26 September 1907
  - Balfour Declaration: 15 November 1926
  - Statute of Westminster Adoption Act: 25 November 1947
  - Constitution Act 1986: 1 January 1987

Area
  - Total: 263,310 km^{2} (101,660 sq mi) (75th)
  - Water (%): 1.6 (Note: The proportion of New Zealand's area (excluding estuaries) covered by rivers, lakes and ponds, based on figures from the New Zealand Land Cover Database, is (357526 + 81936) / (26821559 – 92499–26033 – 19216)=1.6%. If estuarine open water, mangroves, and herbaceous saline vegetation are included, the figure is 2.2%.)

Population
  - November 2026 estimate: ▲5,361,040 (121st)
  - 2023 census: ▲4,993,923
  - Density: 19.9/km^{2} (51.5/sq mi) (204th)
- GDP (PPP): 2026 estimate
  - Total: ▲$313.675 billion (68th)
  - Per capita: ▲$58,563 (36th)
- GDP (nominal): 2026 estimate
  - Total: ▲$273.395 billion (52nd)
  - Per capita: ▲$51,043 (23rd)
- Gini (2022): ▼30.0 medium inequality
- HDI (2023): ▼0.938 very high (17th)
- Currency: New Zealand dollar ($) (NZD)
- Time zone: UTC+12 (NZST (Note: The Chatham Islands have a separate time zone, 45 minutes ahead of the rest of New Zealand.))
  - Summer (DST): UTC+13 (NZDT (Note: Clocks are advanced by an hour from the last Sunday in September until the first Sunday in April. Daylight saving time is also observed in the Chatham Islands, 45 minutes ahead of NZDT.))
- Date format: dd/mm/yyyy
- Calling code: +64
- ISO 3166 code: NZ
- Internet TLD: .nz

New Zealand (Māori: Aotearoa, pronounced [aɔˈtɛaɾɔa]) is an island country in the southwestern Pacific Ocean. It comprises two main landmasses—the North Island (Te Ika-a-Māui) and the South Island (Te Waipounamu)—and over 700 smaller islands. It is the sixth-largest island country by area and lies east of Australia across the Tasman Sea and south of the islands of New Caledonia, Fiji, and Tonga. The country's varied topography and sharp mountain peaks, including the Southern Alps (Kā Tiritiri o te Moana), owe much to tectonic uplift and volcanic eruptions. New Zealand's capital city is Wellington, and its most populous city is Auckland.

The islands of New Zealand were the last large habitable land to be settled by humans. Between about 1280 and 1350, Polynesians began to settle in the islands and subsequently developed a distinctive Māori culture. In 1642, the Dutch explorer Abel Tasman became the first European to sight and record New Zealand. In 1769, the British explorer Captain James Cook became the first European to set foot on and map New Zealand. In 1840, representatives of the United Kingdom and Māori chiefs signed the Treaty of Waitangi, which paved the way for Britain's declaration of sovereignty later that year and the establishment of the Colony of New Zealand in 1841. Subsequently, a series of conflicts between the colonial government and Māori tribes resulted in the alienation and confiscation of large amounts of Māori land. New Zealand became a dominion in 1907; it gained full statutory independence in 1947, retaining the monarch as head of state. Today, the majority of New Zealand's population of around 5.3 million is of European descent; the indigenous Māori are the largest minority, followed by Asians and Pasifika. Reflecting this, New Zealand's culture mainly derives from Māori and early British settlers but has recently broadened from increased immigration. The official languages are English, Māori, and New Zealand Sign Language, with the local dialect of English being dominant.

A developed country, New Zealand was the first to introduce a minimum wage and to give women the right to vote. Recognised as a middle power, New Zealand ranks very highly in international measures of quality of life and human rights and has one of the lowest levels of perceived corruption in the world. It retains visible levels of inequality, including structural disparities between its Māori and European populations. During the 1980s, New Zealand underwent major economic changes that transformed it from a protectionist to a liberalised free-trade economy. The service sector dominates the country's economy, followed by the industrial sector, and agriculture; international tourism is also a significant source of revenue. New Zealand and Australia have a strong relationship and are considered to share a strong Trans-Tasman identity, stemming from centuries of British colonisation. The country is part of multiple international organisations and forums.

Nationally, legislative authority is vested in an elected, unicameral Parliament, while executive political power is exercised by the Government, led by the prime minister, currently Christopher Luxon. Charles III is the country's king and is represented by the governor-general, Cindy Kiro. New Zealand is organised into 11 regional councils and 67 territorial authorities for local government purposes. The Realm of New Zealand also includes Tokelau (a dependent territory); the Cook Islands and Niue (self-governing states in free association with New Zealand); and the Ross Dependency, which is New Zealand's territorial claim in Antarctica.

== Etymology ==
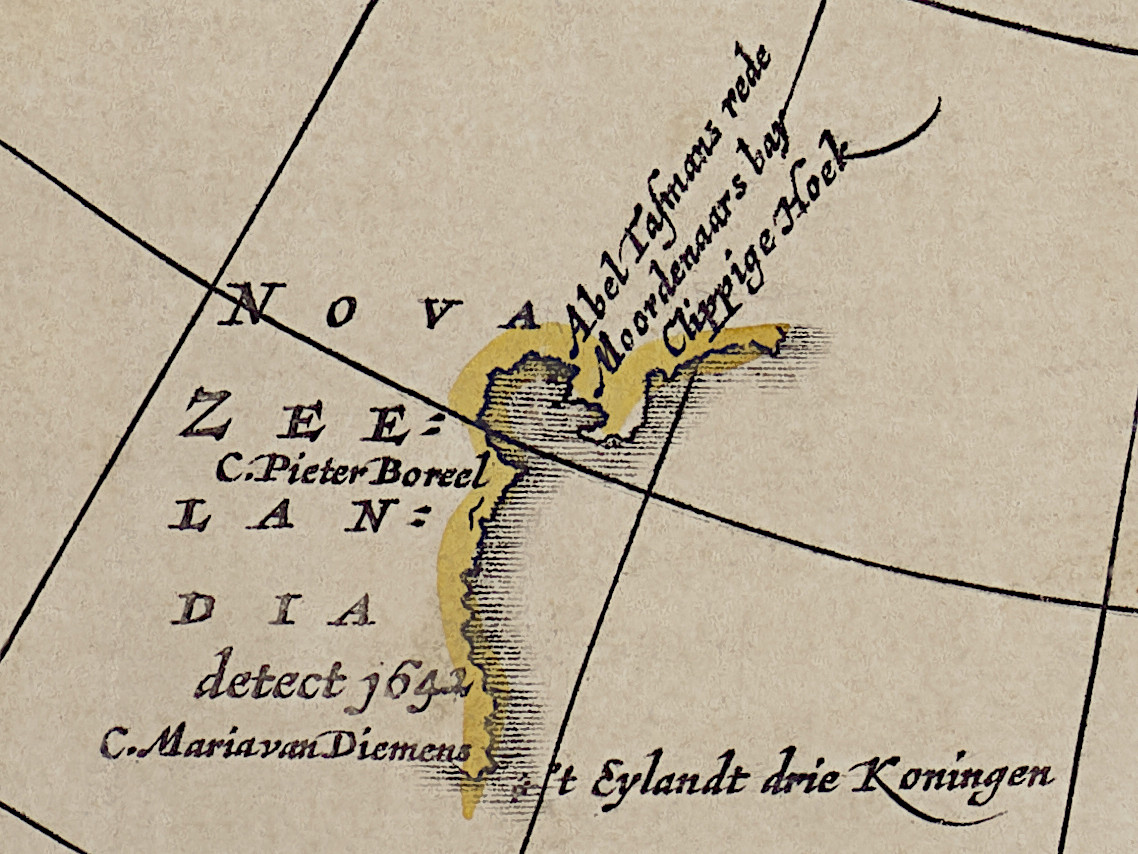
Detail from a 1666 map showing the western coastline of Nova Zeelandia (on this map, north is at the bottom)

The first European visitor to New Zealand, Dutch explorer Abel Tasman, named the islands Staten Land, believing they were part of the Staten Landt that Jacob Le Maire had sighted off the southern end of South America. The next year, in 1643, Hendrik Brouwer proved that the South American land was just a small island, and Dutch cartographers subsequently renamed Tasman's discovery Nova Zeelandia from Latin, after the Dutch province of Zeeland. This name was later anglicised to New Zealand.

This was written as Nu Tireni in the Māori language (spelt Nu Tirani in Te Tiriti o Waitangi). In 1834, a document written in Māori, "He Wakaputanga o te Rangatiratanga o Nu Tireni", was translated into English and became the Declaration of the Independence of New Zealand. It was prepared by Te W(h)akaminenga o Nga Rangatiratanga o Nga Hapu o Nu Tireni, the United Tribes of New Zealand, and a copy was sent to King William IV, who had already acknowledged the flag of the United Tribes of New Zealand and who recognised the declaration in a letter from Lord Glenelg.

Aotearoa (pronounced Māori pronunciation: [aɔˈtɛaɾɔa] in Māori and /ˌaʊtɛəˈroʊ.ə/ in English, often translated as 'land of the long white cloud') is the present Māori name for New Zealand; Aotearoa originally referred to just the North Island. Māori had no known name for the islands collectively before the arrival of Europeans. Māori had several traditional names for the two main islands, including Te Ika-a-Māui ('the fish of Māui') for the North Island and Te Waipounamu ('the waters of greenstone') or Te Waka o Aoraki ('the canoe of Aoraki') for the South Island. Early European maps labelled the islands North (North Island), Middle (South Island), and South (Stewart Island / Rakiura).

In 1830, mapmakers began to use "North" and "South" on their maps to distinguish the two largest islands, and by 1907, this was the accepted norm. The New Zealand Geographic Board discovered in 2009 that the names of the North Island and South Island had never been formalised, and names and alternative names were formalised in 2013. This set the names as North Island or Te Ika-a-Māui, and South Island or Te Waipounamu. For each island, either its English or Māori name can be used, or both can be used together. Similarly the Māori and English names for the whole country are sometimes used together (Aotearoa New Zealand); however, this has no official recognition.

== History ==
The Māori people descend from Polynesians whose ancestors emigrated from Taiwan to Melanesia between 3000 and 1000 BCE and then travelled east, reaching the Society Islands c. 1000 CE. After a pause of 200 to 300 years, a new wave of exploration led to the discovery and settlement of New Zealand.

=== Early settlements ===
The first people to reach New Zealand were Polynesians in oceangoing waka, who are believed to have arrived in several waves between about 1280 and 1350. According to most Māori oral traditions, the islands were first discovered by the semi-legendary explorer Kupe while in pursuit of a giant octopus. These traditions hold that Kupe was followed by a great fleet of settlers, who set out from Hawaiki in eastern Polynesia around 1350. The existence of a single great fleet that settled New Zealand has since been superseded by the belief that the majority of settlement was a planned and deliberate event that occurred over several decades.

The exact date of this settlement is unclear, with recent sources favouring settlement in the 14th century. While mitochondrial DNA variability within Māori populations suggests that New Zealand was first settled between 1250 and 1300, no human remains, artefacts or structures can be reliably dated to earlier than the Kaharoa eruption of Mount Tarawera around 1314. This scenario is also consistent with a debated third line of oral evidence, traditional genealogies (whakapapa) that point to around 1350 as a probable arrival date for several of the migratory waka (canoes) from which many Māori trace their descent. Some Māori later migrated to the Chatham Islands, where they developed their distinct Moriori culture; a later 1835 invasion by Māori iwi resulted in the massacre and virtual extinction of the Moriori.

In a hostile 1642 encounter between Ngāti Tūmatakōkiri and Abel Tasman's crew, four of Tasman's crew members were killed and at least one Māori was hit by canister shot. Europeans did not revisit New Zealand until 1769, when British explorer James Cook mapped almost the entire coastline. Following Cook, New Zealand was visited by numerous European and North American whaling, sealing, and trading ships. They traded European food, metal tools, weapons, and other goods for timber, Māori food, artefacts, and water.

=== 19th century ===
The introduction of the potato and the musket transformed Māori agriculture and warfare. Potatoes provided a reliable food surplus, which enabled longer and more sustained military campaigns. The resulting intertribal Musket Wars encompassed over 600 battles between 1801 and 1840, killing 30,000–40,000 Māori. From the early 19th century, Christian missionaries began to settle New Zealand, eventually converting most of the Māori population. The Māori population declined to around 40% of its pre-contact level during the 19th century; introduced diseases were the major factor.

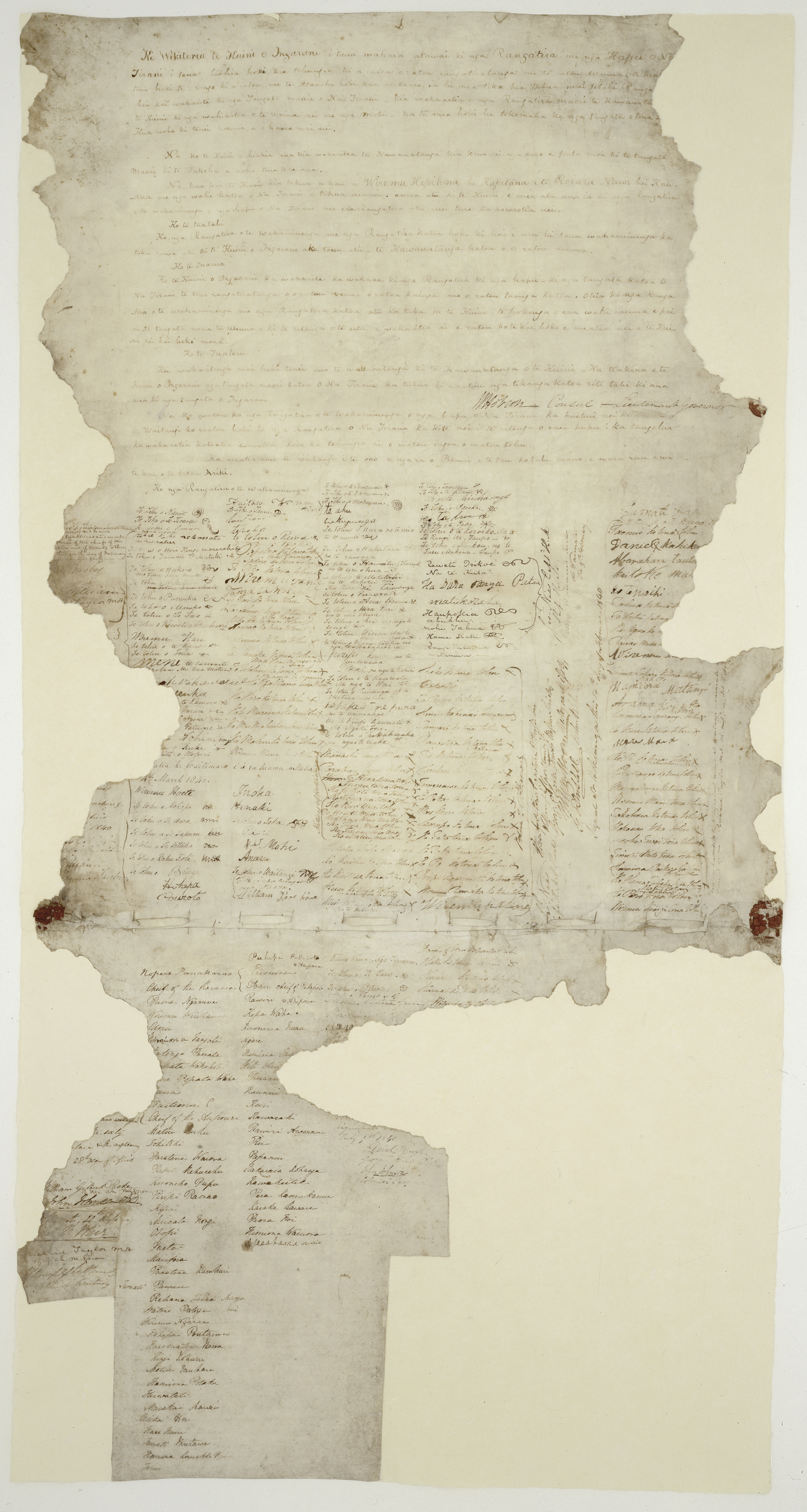
The Waitangi sheet from the Treaty of Waitangi

The British Government appointed James Busby as British Resident to New Zealand in 1832. His duties, given to him by Governor Bourke in Sydney, were to protect settlers and traders "of good standing", prevent "outrages" against Māori, and apprehend escaped convicts. In 1835, following an announcement of impending French settlement by Charles de Thierry, the nebulous United Tribes of New Zealand sent a Declaration of Independence to King William IV of the United Kingdom asking for protection. The Colonial Office sent Captain William Hobson to claim British sovereignty and negotiate a treaty with the Māori, prompted by growing unrest, the New Zealand Company's land-buying survey, and the legal ambiguity of the 1835 Declaration of Independence. The Treaty of Waitangi was first signed in the Bay of Islands on 6 February 1840. In response to the New Zealand Company's attempts to establish an independent settlement in Wellington, Hobson declared British sovereignty over all of New Zealand on 21 May 1840, even though copies of the treaty were still circulating throughout the country for Māori to sign. With the signing of the treaty and declaration of sovereignty, the number of immigrants, particularly from the United Kingdom, began to increase.

New Zealand was administered as a dependency of the Colony of New South Wales until becoming a separate Crown colony, the Colony of New Zealand, on 3 May 1841. Armed conflict began between the colonial government and Māori in 1843 with the Wairau Affray over land and disagreements over sovereignty. These conflicts, mainly in the North Island, saw thousands of imperial troops and the Royal Navy come to New Zealand, and became known as the New Zealand Wars. Following these armed conflicts, large areas of Māori land were confiscated by the government.

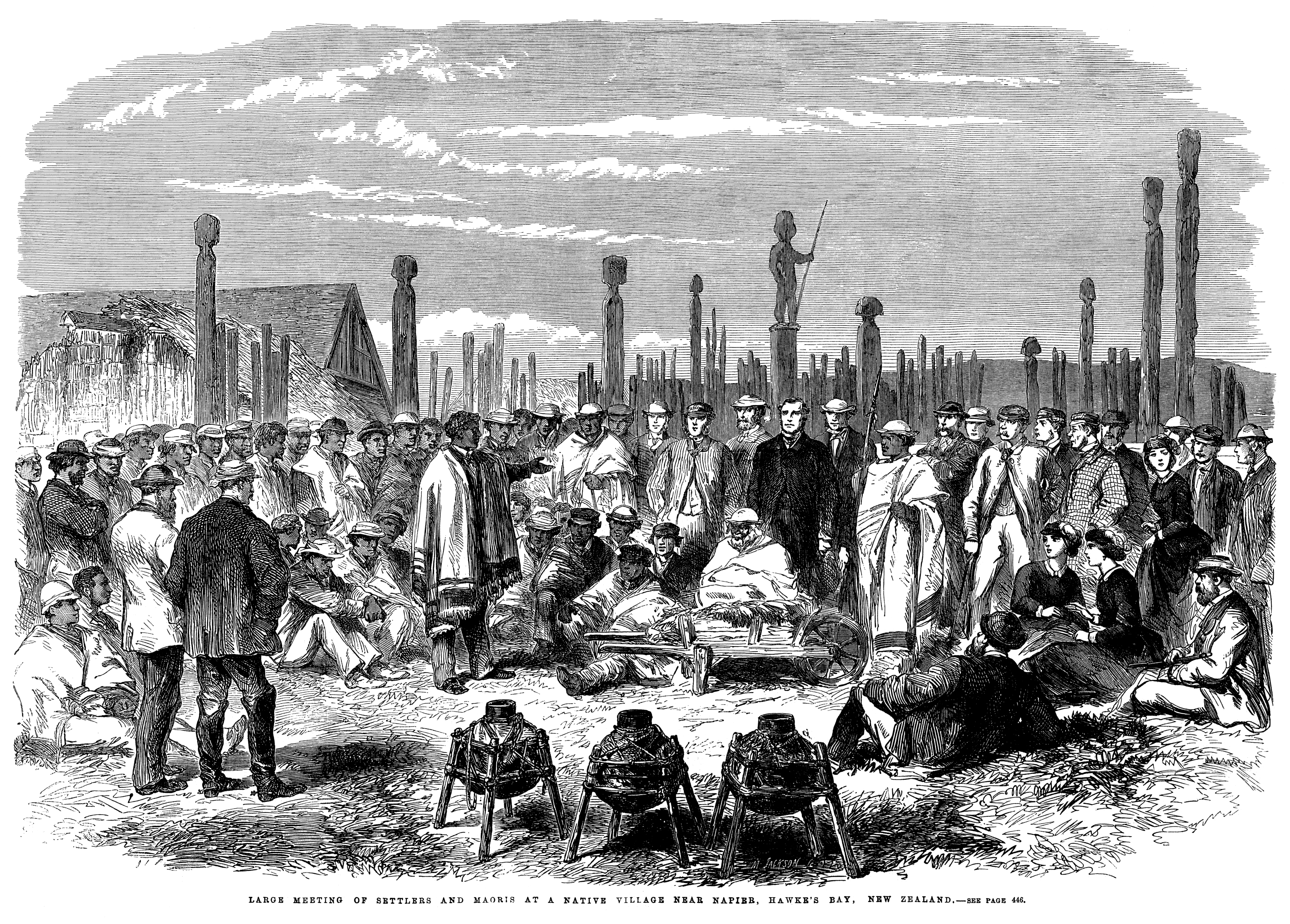
A meeting of European and Māori residents of Hawke's Bay Province. Engraving, 1863.

The colony gained a representative government in 1852, and the first Parliament met in 1854. In 1856 the colony effectively became self-governing, gaining responsibility over all domestic matters, except native policy, which was granted in the mid-1860s. Following concerns that the South Island might form a separate colony, premier Alfred Domett moved a resolution to transfer the capital from Auckland to a locality near Cook Strait. Wellington was chosen for its central location, with Parliament officially sitting there for the first time in 1865.

In 1886, following requests from the government in Wellington concerned about foreign influence in the region, the Secretary of State for Colonies in London agreed to annex the volcanic Kermadec Islands to New Zealand, islands that were seemingly not of "any possible use...to that colony". Instructions were issued directing the Admiral on the Australian Station to hoist the British flag on the Kermadecs, which lie about 1,000 km (620 mi) northeast of Auckland. Since 1937, the islands have been uninhabited except for about six people at Raoul Island station. These islands put the northern border of New Zealand at 29 degrees South latitude. After the 1982 UNCLOS, the islands contributed significantly to New Zealand's exclusive economic zone.

In 1891, the Liberal Party came to power as the first organised political party. The Liberal Government, led by Richard Seddon for most of its period in office, passed many important social and economic measures. In 1893, New Zealand was the first nation in the world to grant all women the right to vote and pioneered the adoption of compulsory arbitration between employers and unions in 1894. The Liberals also guaranteed a minimum wage in 1894, a world first.

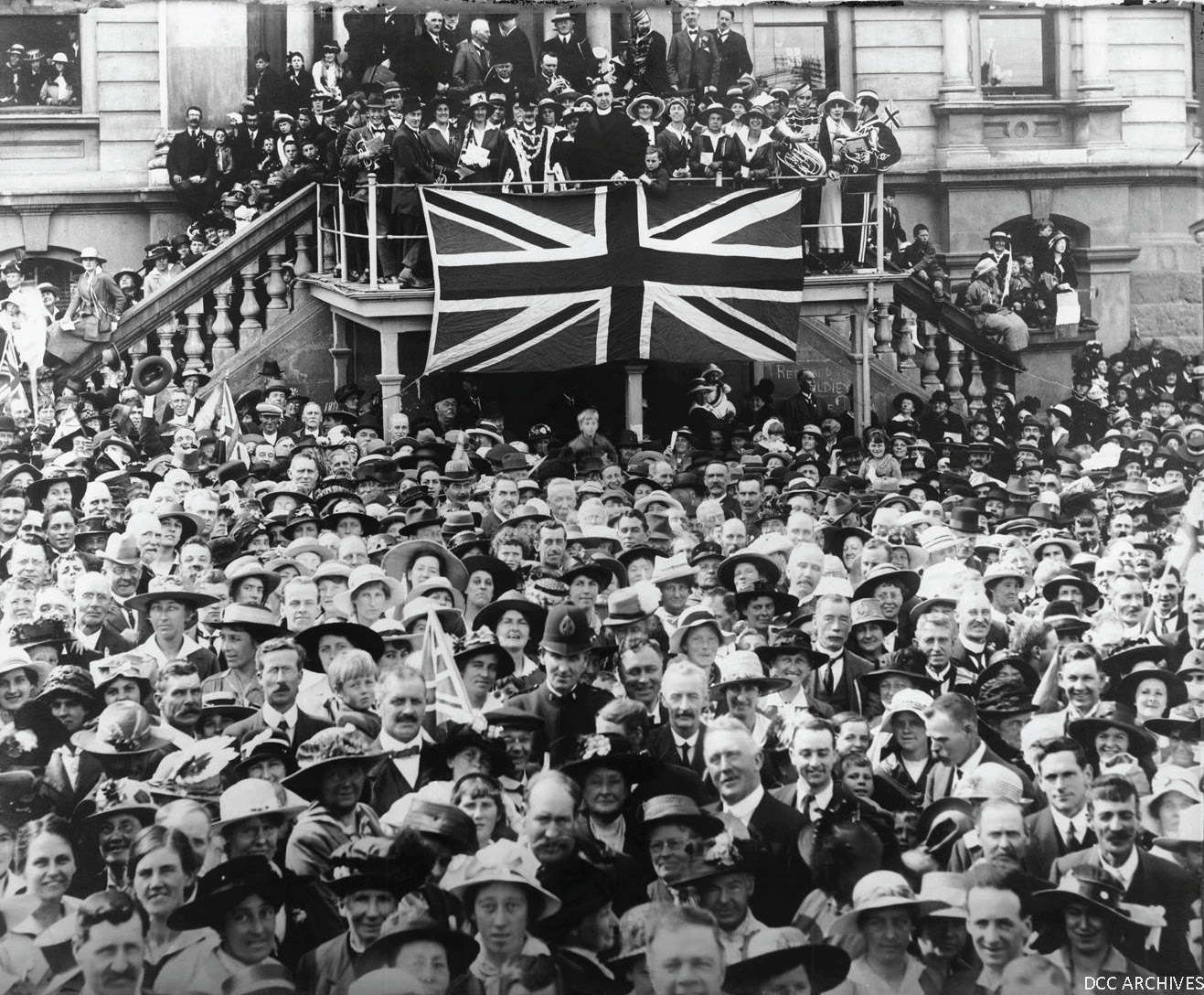
Residents of Dunedin celebrate the news of the Armistice of 11 November 1918.

=== 20th century ===
In 1907, at the request of the New Zealand Parliament, King Edward VII proclaimed New Zealand a Dominion within the British Empire, reflecting its self-governing status. At the 1926 Imperial Conference, the Prime Ministers of the United Kingdom and the Dominions unanimously declared that all were equal and autonomous members of the British Commonwealth of Nations. In 1947, New Zealand adopted the Statute of Westminster implementing the declaration, confirming that the British Parliament could no longer legislate for the country without its consent. The British government's residual legislative powers were later removed by the Constitution Act 1986, and final rights of appeal to the British Privy Council were abolished in 2003.

Early in the 20th century, New Zealand was involved in world affairs, fighting in the First and Second World Wars and suffering through the Great Depression. The depression led to the election of the first Labour Government and the establishment of a comprehensive welfare state and a protectionist economy. New Zealand experienced increasing prosperity following the Second World War, and Māori began to leave their traditional rural life and move to the cities in search of work. A Māori protest movement developed, which criticised Eurocentrism and worked for greater recognition of Māori culture and of the Treaty of Waitangi. In 1975, the Waitangi Tribunal was set up to investigate alleged breaches of the Treaty, and it was enabled to investigate historic grievances in 1985. The government has negotiated settlements of these grievances with many iwi, although Māori claims to the foreshore and seabed proved controversial in the 2000s.

== Geography ==
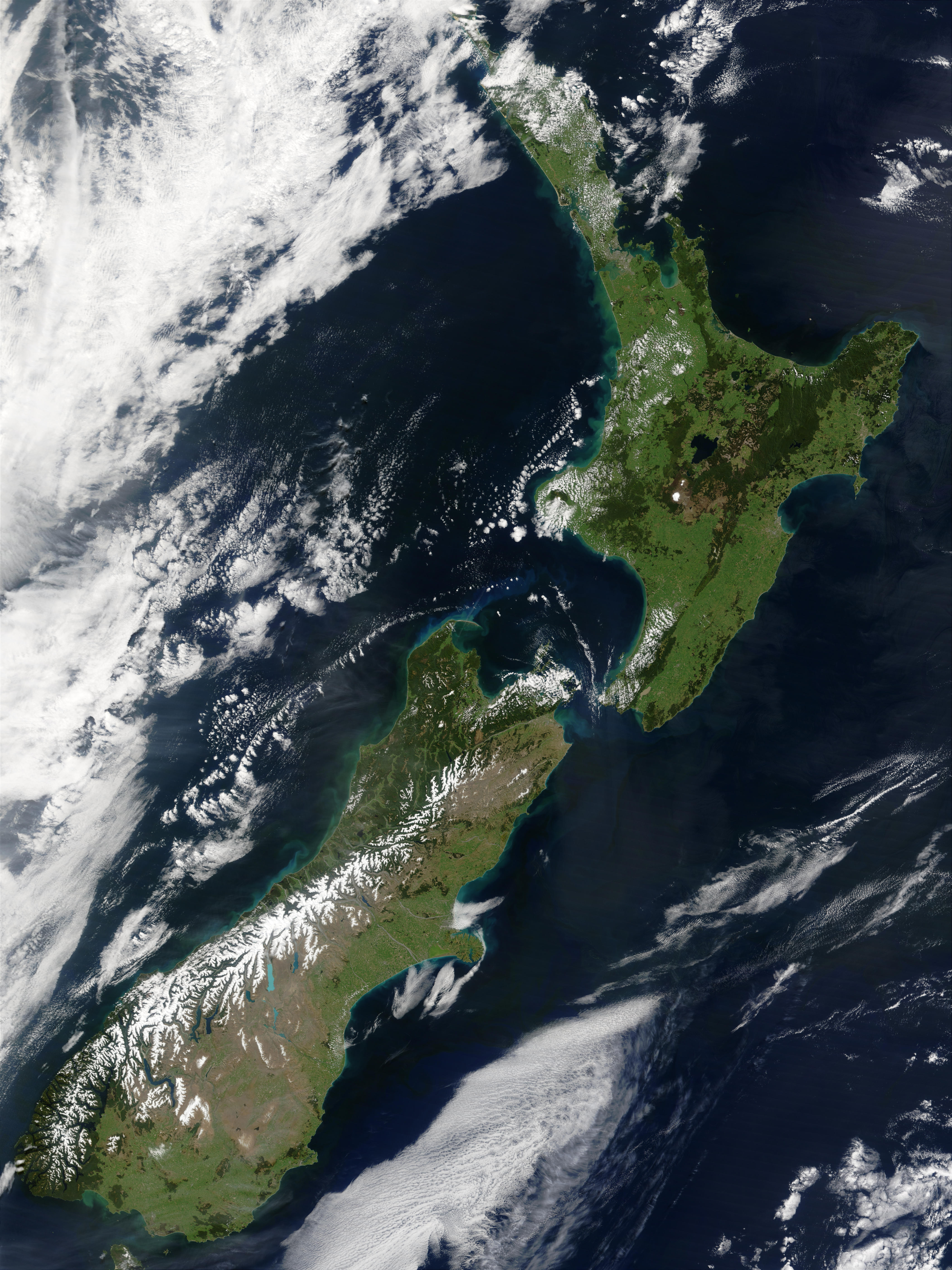
The snow-capped Southern Alps dominate the South Island, while the North Island's Northland Peninsula stretches towards the subtropics.

New Zealand is near the centre of the water hemisphere and comprises two main islands and more than 700 smaller islands. The two main islands (the North Island, or Te Ika-a-Māui, and the South Island, or Te Waipounamu) are separated by Cook Strait, 22 kilometres (14 mi) wide at its narrowest point. Besides the North and South Islands, the five largest inhabited islands are Stewart Island (across the Foveaux Strait), Chatham Island, Great Barrier Island (in the Hauraki Gulf), D'Urville Island (in the Marlborough Sounds) and Waiheke Island (about 22 km (14 mi) from central Auckland). The nearest continent is Australia to the west north west, with the shortest distance between the Australian and New Zealand mainlands being roughly 1,487 kilometers (924 miles) across the Tasman Sea, specifically between Tasmania and Fiordland. The closest point between any territory of both countries is between Macquarie Island (Australia) and Auckland Island (New Zealand), which are about 618 kilometers (384 miles) apart.

New Zealand is long and narrow—over 1,600 kilometres (990 mi) along its north-north-east axis with a maximum width of 400 kilometres (250 mi)—with about 15,000 km (9,300 mi) of coastline and a total land area of 268,000 square kilometres (103,500 sq mi). Because of its far-flung outlying islands and long coastline, the country has extensive marine resources. Its exclusive economic zone is one of the world's largest, covering more than 15 times its land area.

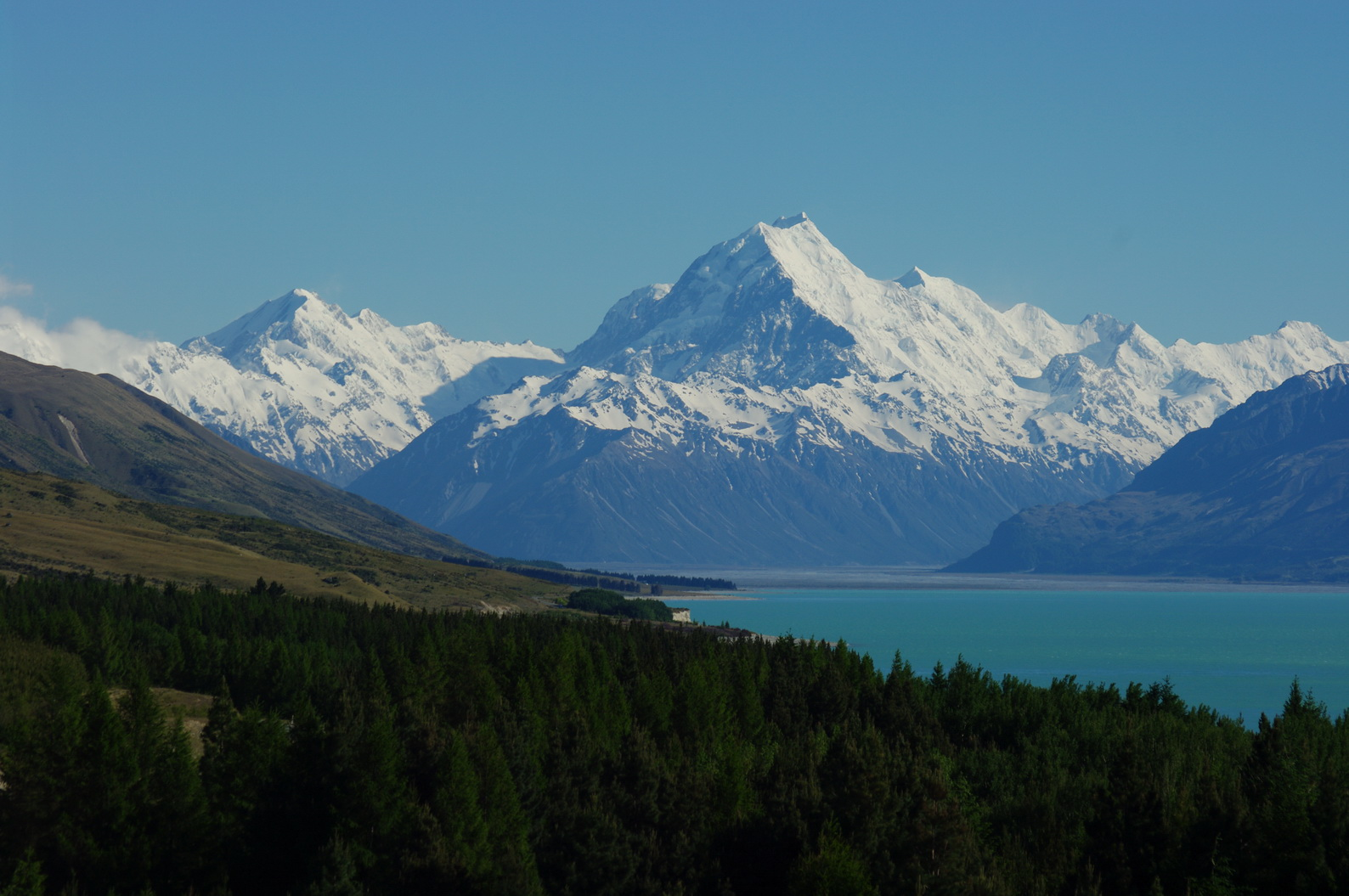
Aoraki / Mount Cook is the highest point in New Zealand, at 3,724 metres.

The South Island is the largest landmass of New Zealand. It is divided along its length by the Southern Alps. There are 18 peaks over 3,000 metres (9,800 ft), the highest of which is Aoraki / Mount Cook at 3,724 metres (12,218 ft). Fiordland's steep mountains and deep fiords record the extensive ice age glaciation of this southwestern corner of the South Island. The North Island is less mountainous but is marked by volcanism. The highly active Taupō Volcanic Zone has formed a large volcanic plateau, punctuated by the North Island's highest mountain, Mount Ruapehu (2,797 metres (9,177 ft)). The plateau also hosts the country's largest lake, Lake Taupō, nestled in the caldera of one of the world's most active supervolcanoes. New Zealand is prone to earthquakes.

The country owes its varied topography, and perhaps even its emergence above the waves, to the dynamic boundary it straddles between the Pacific and Indo-Australian Plates. New Zealand is part of Zealandia, a microcontinent nearly half the size of Australia that gradually submerged after breaking away from the Gondwanan supercontinent. About 25 million years ago, a shift in plate tectonic movements began to contort and crumple the region. This is now most evident in the Southern Alps, formed by compression of the crust beside the Alpine Fault. Elsewhere, the plate boundary involves the subduction of one plate under the other, producing the Puysegur Trench to the south, the Hikurangi Trough east of the North Island, and the Kermadec and Tonga Trenches further north.

New Zealand, together with Australia, is part of a wider region known as Australasia. It also forms the southwestern extremity of the geographic and ethnographic region called Polynesia. Oceania is a wider region encompassing the Australian continent, New Zealand, and various island countries in the Pacific Ocean that are not included in the seven-continent model.

=== Climate ===
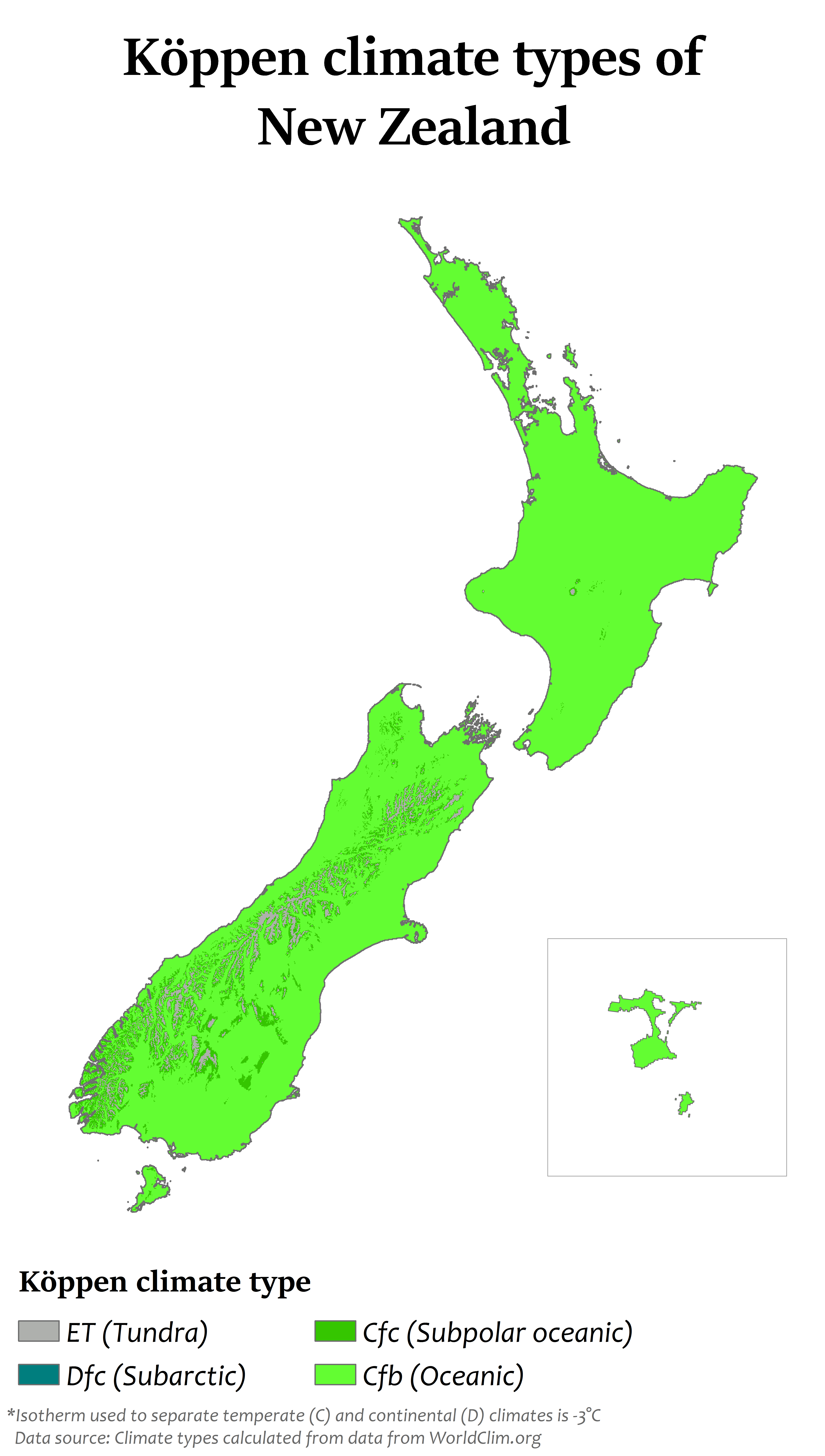
Köppen-Geiger climate classification map of New Zealand

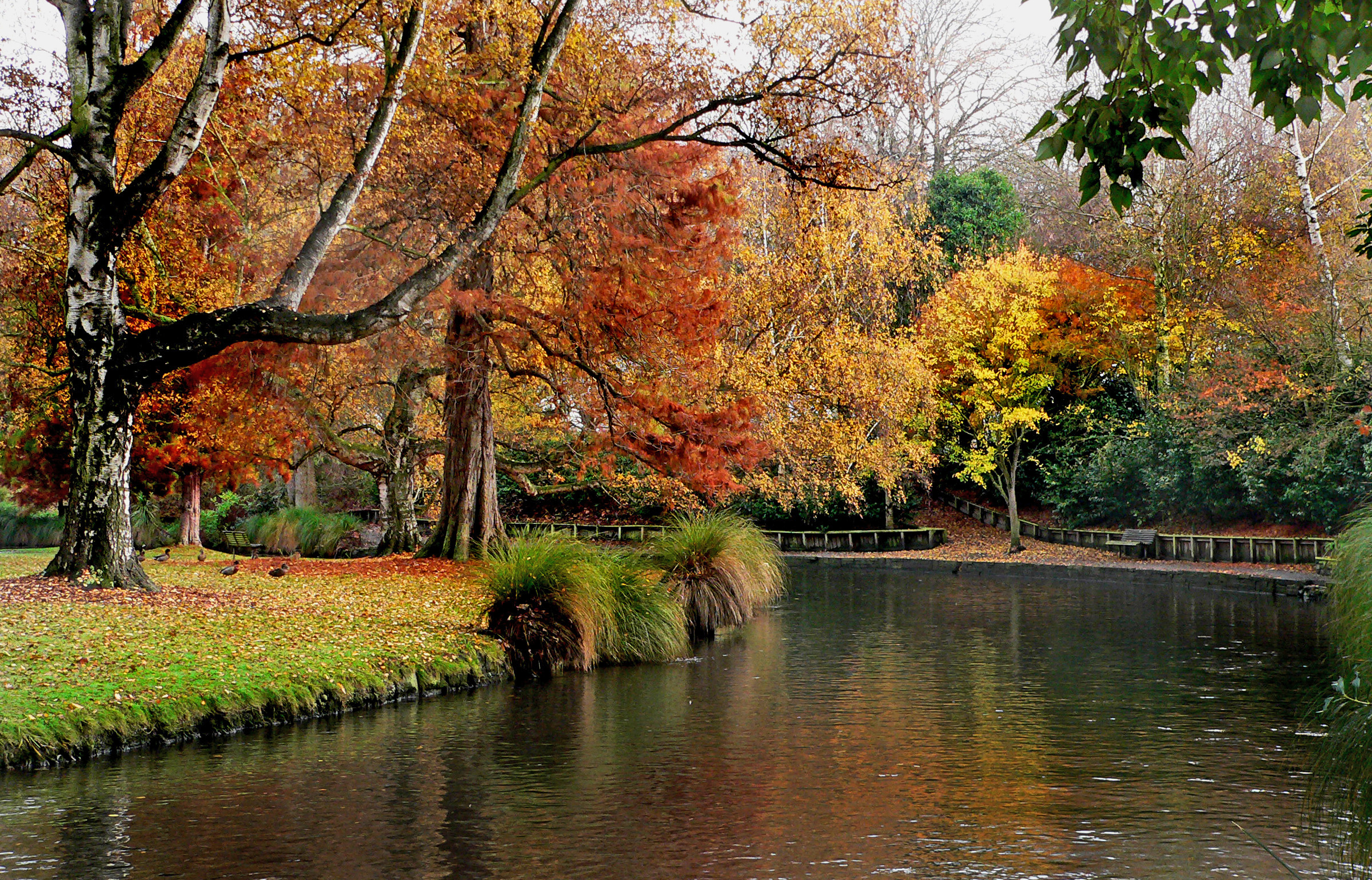
Autumn in the Christchurch Botanic Gardens

New Zealand's climate is predominantly temperate maritime (Köppen: Cfb), with mean annual temperatures ranging from 10 °C (50 °F) in the south to 16 °C (61 °F) in the north. Historical maxima and minima are 42.4 °C (108.32 °F) in Rangiora, Canterbury and −25.6 °C (−14.08 °F) in Ranfurly, Otago. Conditions vary sharply across regions, from extremely wet on the West Coast of the South Island to semi-arid in Central Otago and the Mackenzie Basin of inland Canterbury and subtropical in Northland.

Of the seven largest cities, Christchurch is the driest, receiving on average only 618 millimetres (24.3 in) of rain per year. Wellington is the wettest, receiving almost twice that amount. Auckland, Wellington and Christchurch all receive a yearly average of more than 2,000 hours of sunshine. The southern and southwestern parts of the South Island have a cooler and cloudier climate, with around 1,400–1,600 hours. The northern and northeastern parts of the South Island are the sunniest areas of the country and receive about 2,400–2,500 hours.

Snow generally falls from June to October, although cold snaps can occur outside of those months. Snowfall is common in the eastern and southern parts of the South Island and mountain areas across the country.

Average daily temperatures and rainfall for selected towns and cities of New Zealand
Location	January high °C (°F)	January low °C (°F)	July high °C (°F)	July low °C (°F)	Annual rainfall mm (in)
Auckland	23 (73)	15 (59)	15 (59)	8 (46)	1,212 (47.7)
Wellington	20 (68)	14 (57)	11 (52)	6 (43)	1,207 (47.5)
Hokitika	20 (68)	12 (54)	12 (54)	3 (37)	2,901 (114.2)
Christchurch	23 (73)	12 (54)	11 (52)	2 (36)	618 (24.3)
Alexandra	25 (77)	11 (52)	8 (46)	−2 (28)	359 (14.1)

=== Biodiversity ===
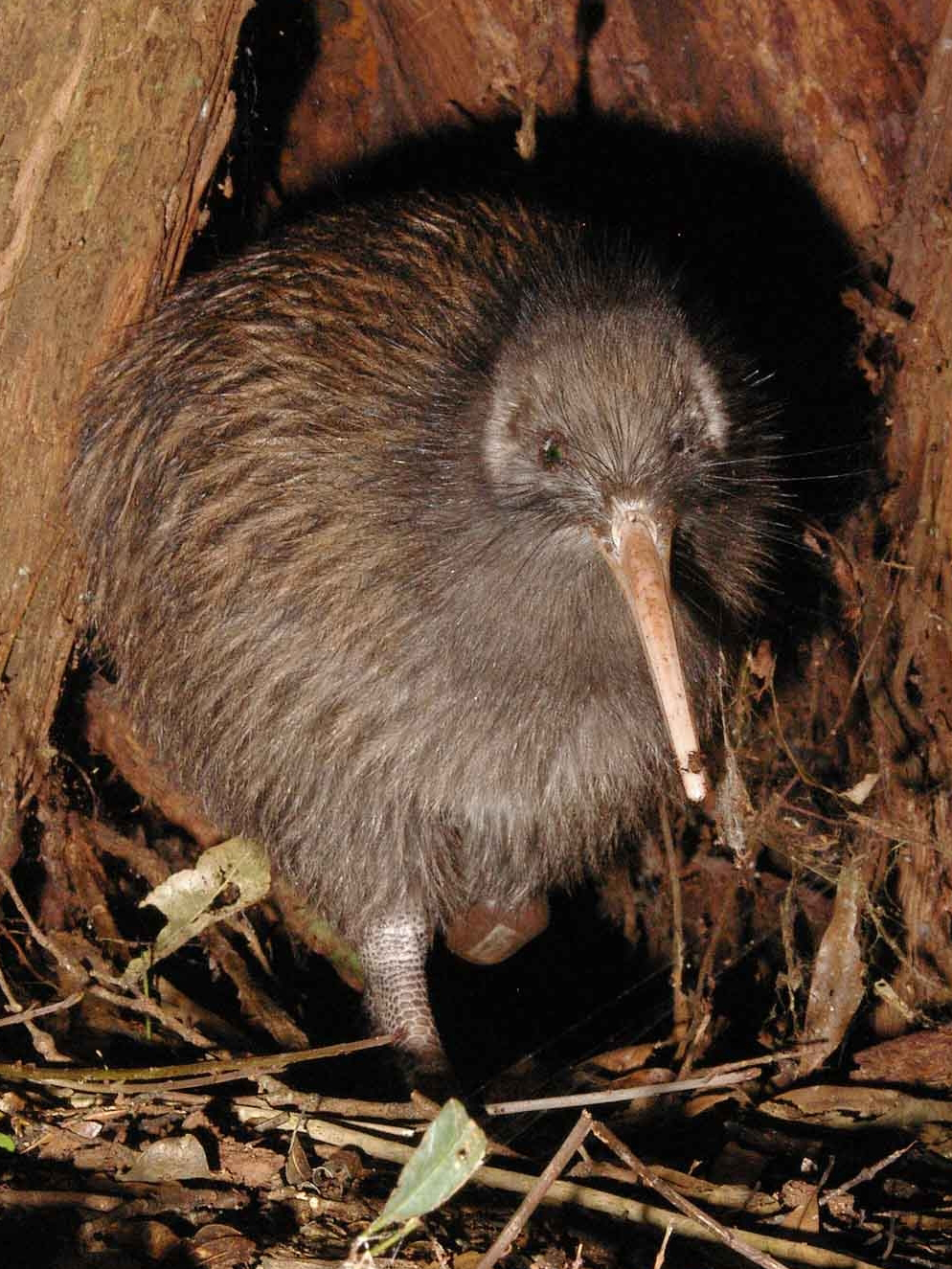
The endemic flightless kiwi is a national icon.

New Zealand's geographic isolation for 80 million years and island biogeography has influenced evolution of the country's species of animals, fungi and plants. Physical isolation has caused biological isolation, resulting in a dynamic evolutionary ecology with examples of distinctive plants and animals as well as populations of widespread species. The flora and fauna of New Zealand were originally thought to have originated from New Zealand's fragmentation off from Gondwana; however, more recent evidence postulates species resulted from dispersal.

About 82% of New Zealand's indigenous vascular plants are endemic, covering 1,944 species across 65 genera. The number of fungi recorded from New Zealand, including lichen-forming species, is not known, nor is the proportion of those fungi which are endemic, but one estimate suggests there are about 2,300 species of lichen-forming fungi in New Zealand and 40% of these are endemic. The two main types of forest are those dominated by broadleaf trees with emergent podocarps, or by southern beech in cooler climates. The remaining vegetation types consist of grasslands, the majority of which are tussock.

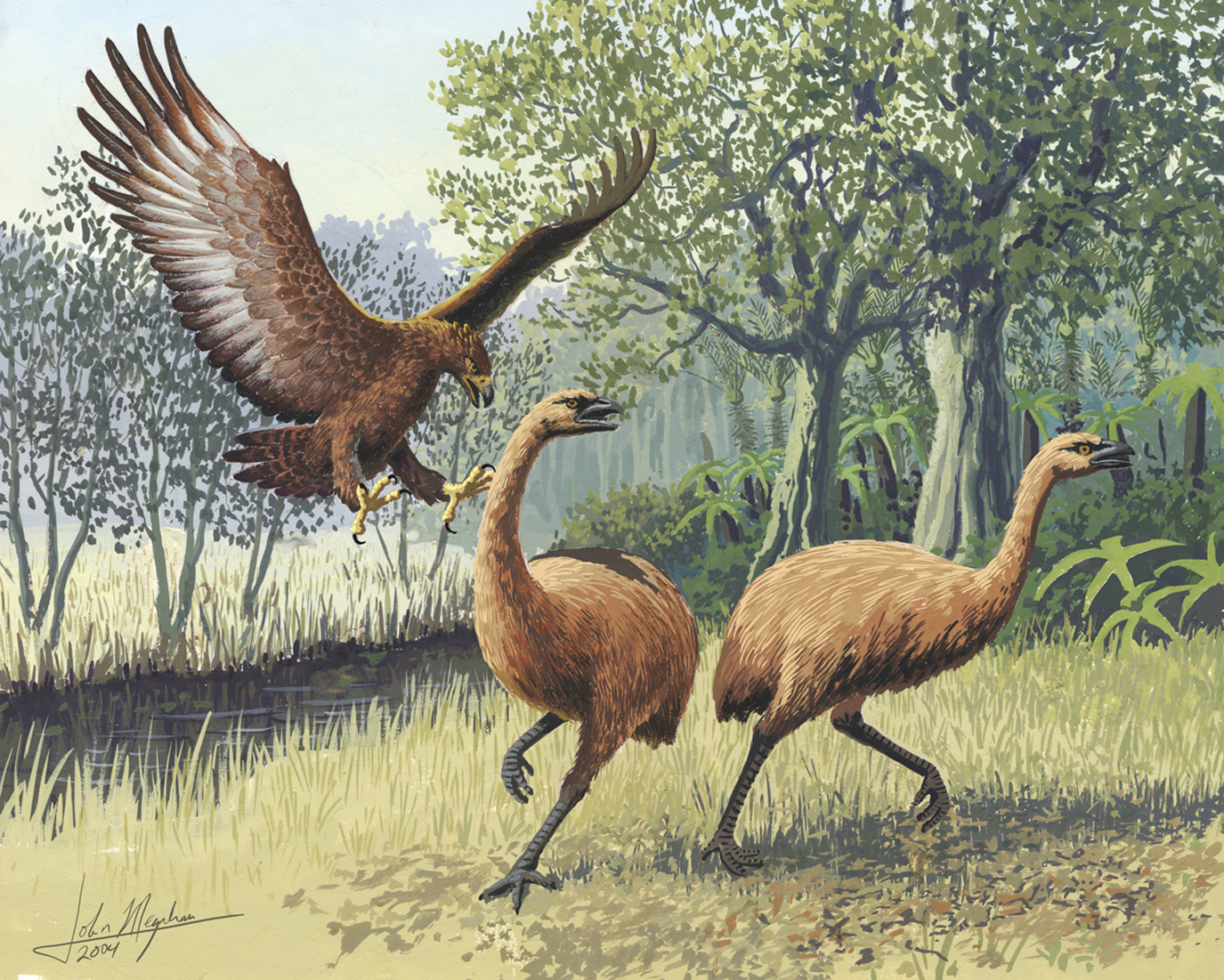
The giant Haast's eagle died out when Māori hunted its main prey, the moa, to extinction.

Before humans arrived, an estimated 80% of the land was covered in forest, with only high alpine, wet, infertile and volcanic areas without trees. Massive deforestation occurred after humans arrived, with around half the forest cover lost to fire after Polynesian settlement. Much of the remaining forest fell after European settlement, being logged or cleared to make room for pastoral farming, leaving forest occupying only 23% of the land in 1997.

The forests were dominated by birds, and the lack of mammalian predators led to some, like the kiwi, kākāpō, weka and takahē, evolving flightlessness. The arrival of humans, associated changes to habitat, and the introduction of rats, ferrets and other mammals led to the extinction of many bird species, including large birds like the moa and Haast's eagle. The forests of the country are home to many endemic birds including kererū, New Zealand falcon, kākā, red-crowned parakeet, rifleman, tūī, New Zealand fantail, kōkako, saddleback, stitchbird, and New Zealand fernbird. The shorelines are inhabited by many endemic shorebirds including black stilt, variable oystercatcher, shore plover, spotted shag, and New Zealand king shag. Due to the isolation of the islands and historic lack of predators, the nation is home to countless breeding seabirds including black-billed gull, northern royal albatross, white-faced storm petrel, grey-faced petrel, fairy prion, and Australasian gannet.

Other indigenous animals are represented by reptiles (tuatara, skinks and geckos), frogs, such as the protected endangered Hamilton's Frog, spiders, insects (wētā), and snails. Some, such as the tuatara, are so unique that they have been called living fossils. Three species of bats (one since extinct) were the only sign of native land mammals in New Zealand until the 2006 discovery of bones from a unique, mouse-sized land mammal at least 16 million years old. Marine mammals are abundant, with almost half the world's cetaceans (whales, dolphins, and porpoises) and large numbers of fur seals reported in New Zealand waters. Many seabirds breed in New Zealand, a third of them unique to the country. More penguin species are found in New Zealand than in any other country, with 13 of the world's 18 penguin species.

Since human arrival, almost half of the country's vertebrate species have become extinct, including at least 51 birds, three frogs, three lizards, one freshwater fish, and one bat. Others are endangered or have had their range severely reduced. New Zealand conservationists have pioneered several methods to help threatened wildlife recover, including island sanctuaries, pest control, wildlife translocation, fostering, and ecological restoration of islands and other protected areas.

== Government and politics ==
Charles III,
King of New Zealand

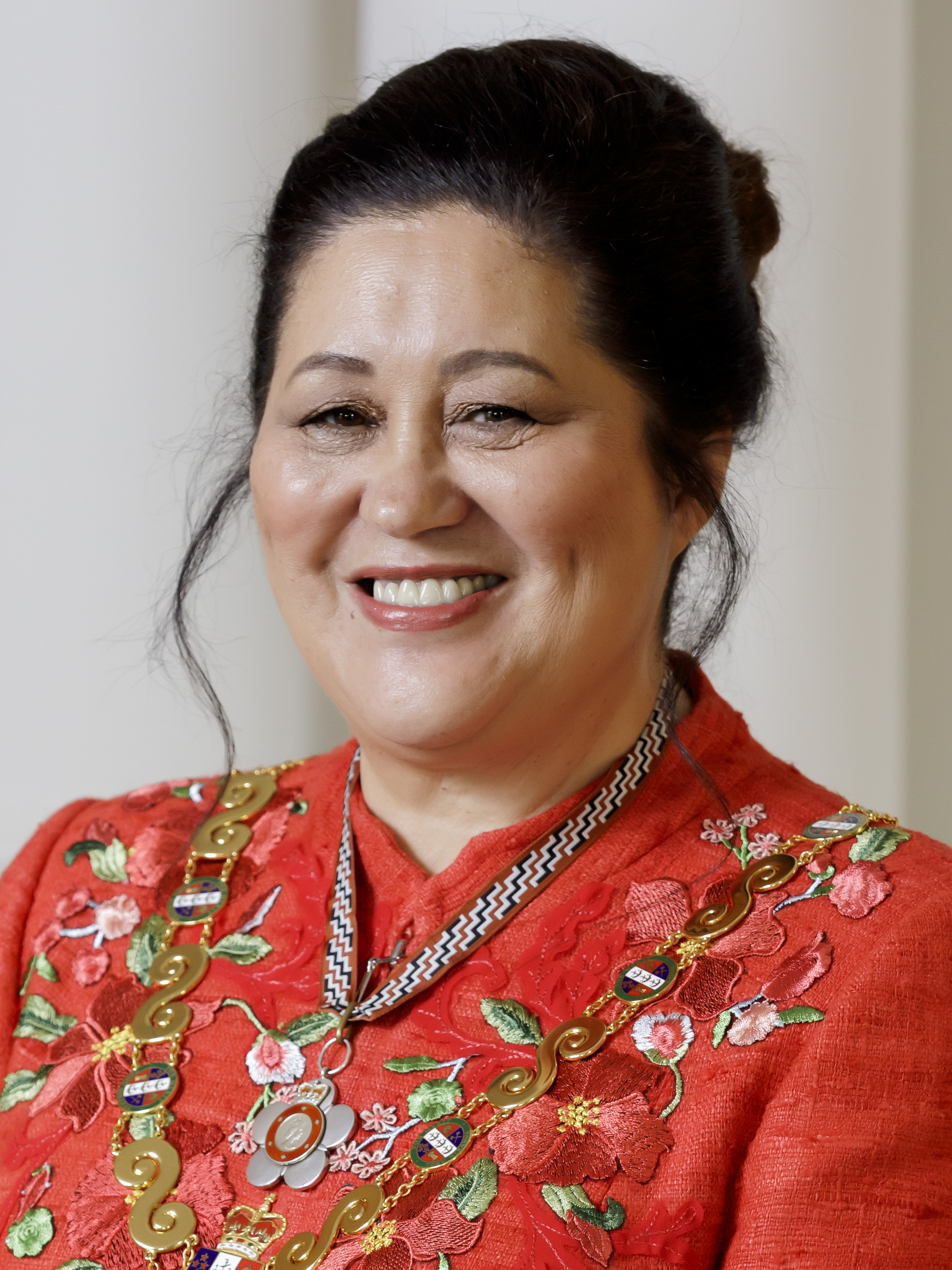
Cindy Kiro, Governor-General of New Zealand

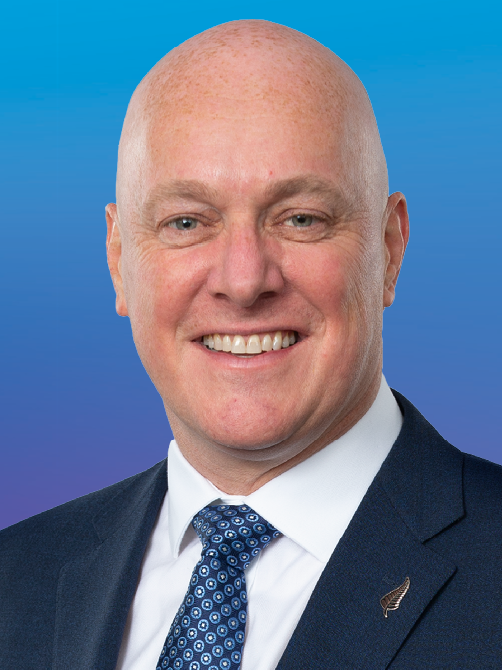
Christopher Luxon, Prime Minister of New Zealand

New Zealand is a constitutional monarchy with a parliamentary democracy, although its constitution is not codified. Charles III is the King of New Zealand and thus the head of state. The king is represented by the governor-general, whom he appoints on the advice of the prime minister. The governor-general can exercise the Crown's prerogative powers, such as reviewing cases of injustice and making appointments of ministers, ambassadors, and other key public officials, and in rare situations, the reserve powers (e.g. the power to dissolve Parliament or refuse the royal assent of a bill into law). The powers of the monarch and the governor-general are limited by constitutional constraints and cannot normally be exercised without the advice of ministers.

The New Zealand Parliament holds legislative power and consists of the king and the House of Representatives. It also included an upper house, the Legislative Council, until this was abolished in 1950. The supremacy of parliament over the Crown and other government institutions was established in England by the Bill of Rights 1689 and has been ratified as law in New Zealand. The House of Representatives is democratically elected, and a government is formed from the party or coalition with the majority of seats. If no majority is formed, a minority government can be formed if support from other parties during confidence and supply votes is assured. The governor-general appoints ministers under advice from the prime minister, who is by convention the parliamentary leader of the governing party or coalition. Cabinet, formed by ministers and led by the prime minister, is the highest policy-making body in government and responsible for deciding significant government actions. Members of Cabinet make major decisions collectively and are therefore collectively responsible for the consequences of these decisions. The 42nd and current prime minister, since 27 November 2023, is Christopher Luxon.

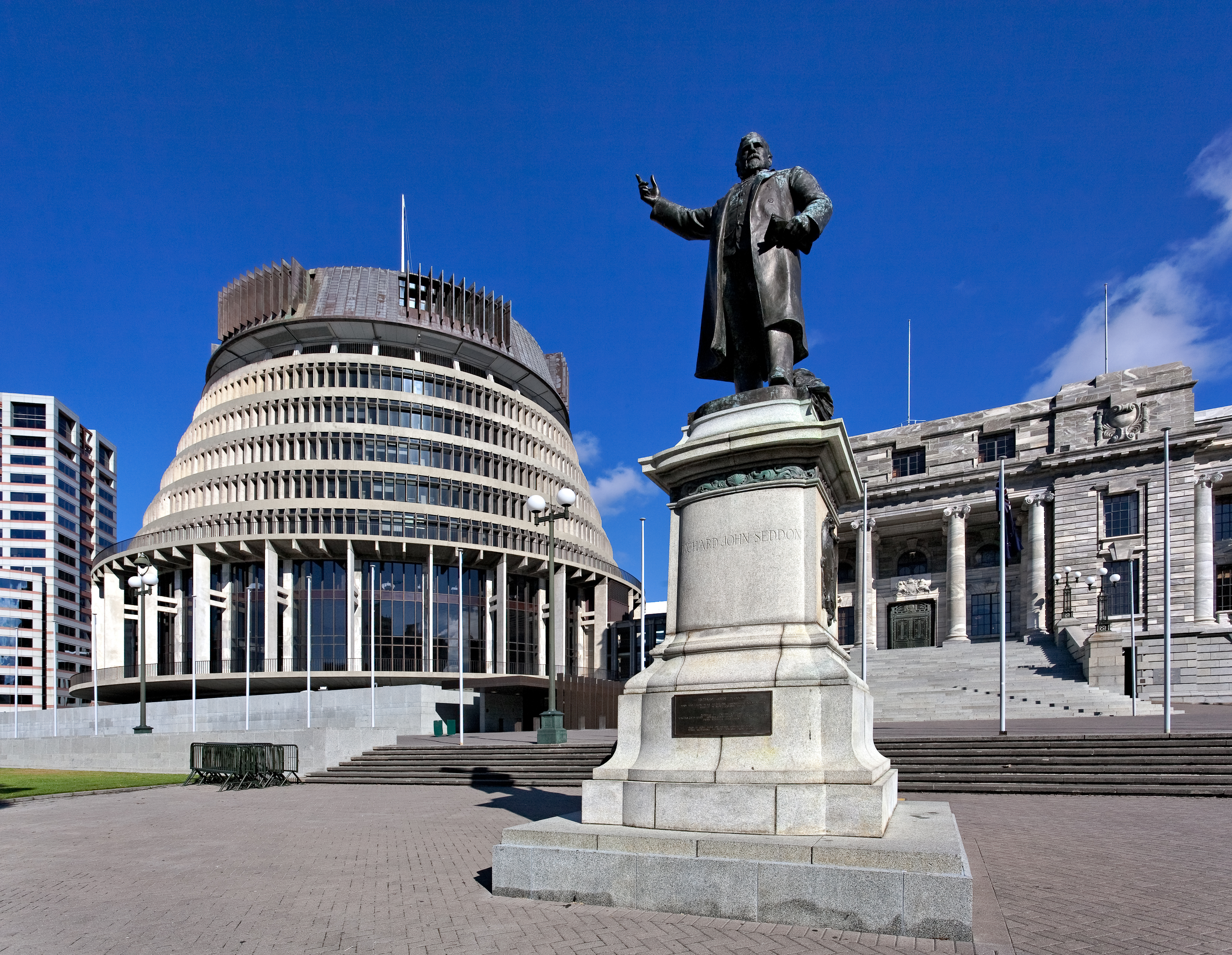
A statue of Richard Seddon, the "Beehive" (Executive Wing), and Parliament House (right), in Parliament Grounds, Wellington

A parliamentary general election must be called no later than three years after the previous election. Almost all general elections between 1853 and 1993 were held under the first-past-the-post voting system. Since the 1996 election, a form of proportional representation called mixed-member proportional (MMP) has been used. Under the MMP system, each person has two votes; one is for a candidate standing in the voter's electorate, and the other is for a party. Based on the 2018 census data, there are 72 electorates (which include seven Māori electorates in which only Māori can optionally vote), and the remaining 48 of the 120 seats are assigned so that representation in Parliament reflects the party vote, with the threshold that a party must win at least one electorate or 5% of the total party vote before it is eligible for a seat. Elections since the 1930s have been dominated by two political parties, National and Labour. More parties have been represented in Parliament since the introduction of MMP.

New Zealand's judiciary, headed by the chief justice, includes the Supreme Court, Court of Appeal, the High Court, and subordinate courts. Judges and judicial officers are appointed non-politically and under strict rules regarding tenure to help maintain judicial independence. This theoretically allows the judiciary to interpret the law based solely on the legislation enacted by Parliament without other influences on their decisions.

New Zealand is identified as one of the world's most stable and well-governed states. As of 2023, the country is ranked second in the strength of its democratic institutions, and third in government transparency and lack of corruption. LGBT rights in the nation are also recognised as among the most tolerant in Oceania. New Zealand ranks highly for civic participation in the political process, with 82% voter turnout during recent general elections, compared to an OECD average of 69%. But this is untrue of local council elections; a historically low 36% of eligible New Zealanders voted in the 2022 local elections, compared with an already low 42% turnout in 2019. A 2017 human rights report by the United States Department of State noted that the New Zealand government generally respected the rights of individuals, but voiced concerns regarding the social status of the Māori population. The New Zealand Human Rights Commission has asserted that there is strong, consistent evidence that structural discrimination is a real and ongoing socioeconomic issue. One example of structural inequality in New Zealand can be seen in the criminal justice system. According to the Ministry of Justice, Māori are overrepresented, comprising 45% of New Zealanders convicted of crimes and 53% of those imprisoned, while only being 16.5% of the population.

=== Regions and external territories ===
Map of regions (coloured) and territorial authorities (outlined) in New Zealand

Under legislation passed in London, New Zealand was divided into six provinces in 1853. Following further legislation shortly afterwards three further provinces were created from three of the original six, leaving the country with nine provinces in 1862, each with a degree of autonomy under an elected superintendent. Because of financial pressures and the desire to consolidate railways, education, land sales, and other policies, government was centralised and the provinces were abolished in 1876. The provinces are remembered in regional public holidays and sporting rivalries.

Since 1876, various councils have administered local areas under legislation determined by the central government. In 1989, the government reorganised local government into the current two-tier structure of regional councils and territorial authorities. The 249 municipalities that existed in 1975 have been consolidated into 67 territorial authorities and 11 regional councils. The regional councils' role is to regulate "the natural environment with particular emphasis on resource management", while territorial authorities are responsible for sewage, water, local roads, building consents, and other local matters. Five of the territorial councils are unitary authorities and also act as regional councils. The territorial authorities consist of 13 city councils, 53 district councils, and the Chatham Islands Council. While officially the Chatham Islands Council is not a unitary authority, it undertakes many functions of a regional council.

The Realm of New Zealand, one of 15 Commonwealth realms, is the entire area over which the king or queen of New Zealand is sovereign and comprises New Zealand, Tokelau, the Ross Dependency, the Cook Islands, and Niue. The Cook Islands and Niue are self-governing states in free association with New Zealand. The New Zealand Parliament cannot pass legislation for these countries, but with their consent can act on behalf of them in foreign affairs and defence. Tokelau is classified as a non-self-governing territory, but is administered by a council of three elders (one from each Tokelauan atoll). The Ross Dependency is New Zealand's territorial claim in Antarctica, where it operates the Scott Base research facility. New Zealand nationality law treats all parts of the realm equally, so most people born in New Zealand, the Cook Islands, Niue, Tokelau, and the Ross Dependency are New Zealand citizens. (Note: A person born on or after 1 January 2006 acquires New Zealand citizenship at birth only if at least one parent is a New Zealand citizen or permanent resident. All persons born on or before 31 December 2005 acquired citizenship at birth (jus soli).)

=== Foreign relations ===
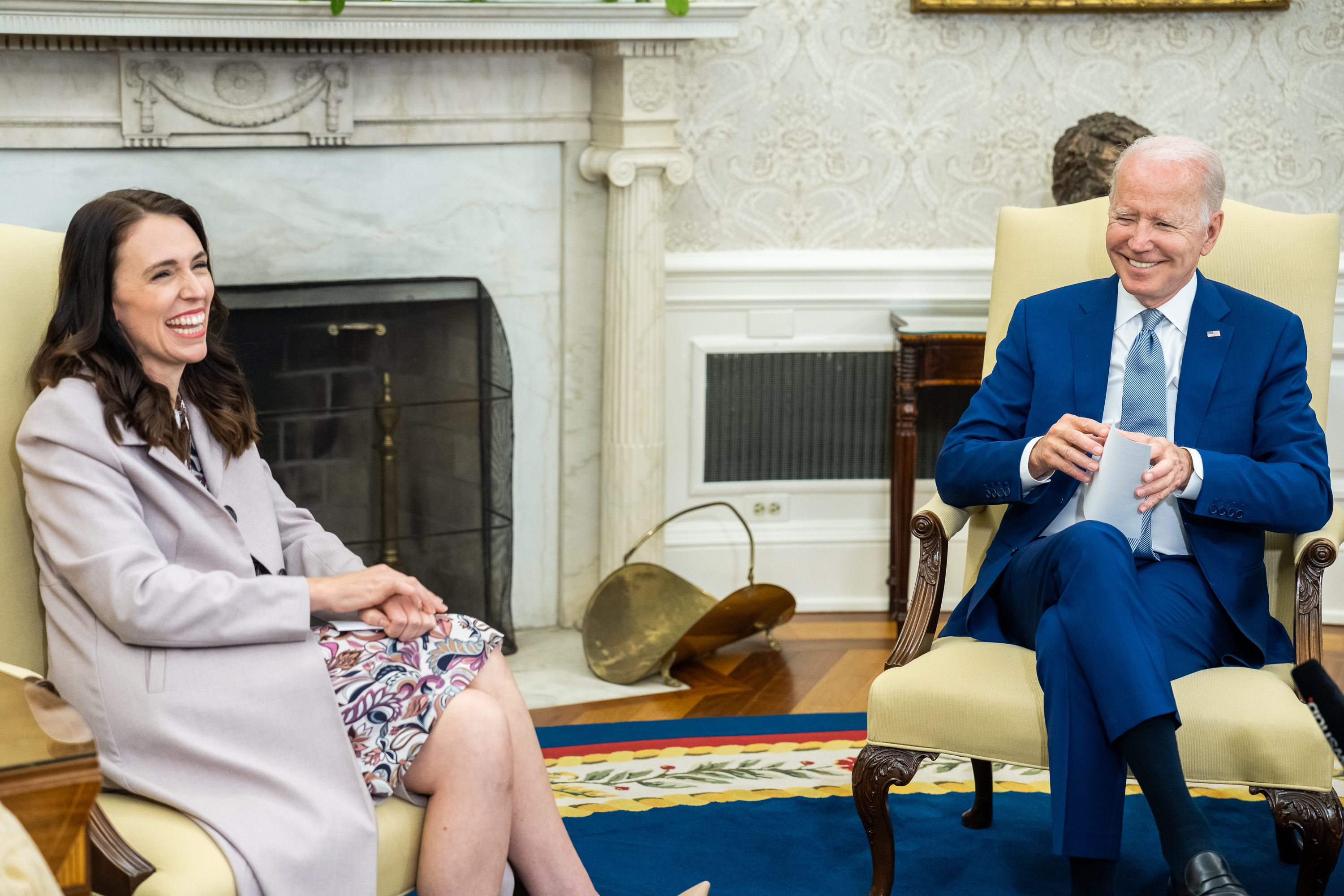
Former New Zealand prime minister Jacinda Ardern with US president Joe Biden in the Oval Office, 2022

During the period of the New Zealand colony, Britain was responsible for external trade and foreign relations. The 1923 and 1926 Imperial Conferences decided that New Zealand should be allowed to negotiate its own political treaties, and the first commercial treaty was ratified in 1928 with Japan. On 3 September 1939, New Zealand allied itself with Britain and declared war on Germany with Prime Minister Michael Joseph Savage proclaiming, "Where she goes, we go; where she stands, we stand".

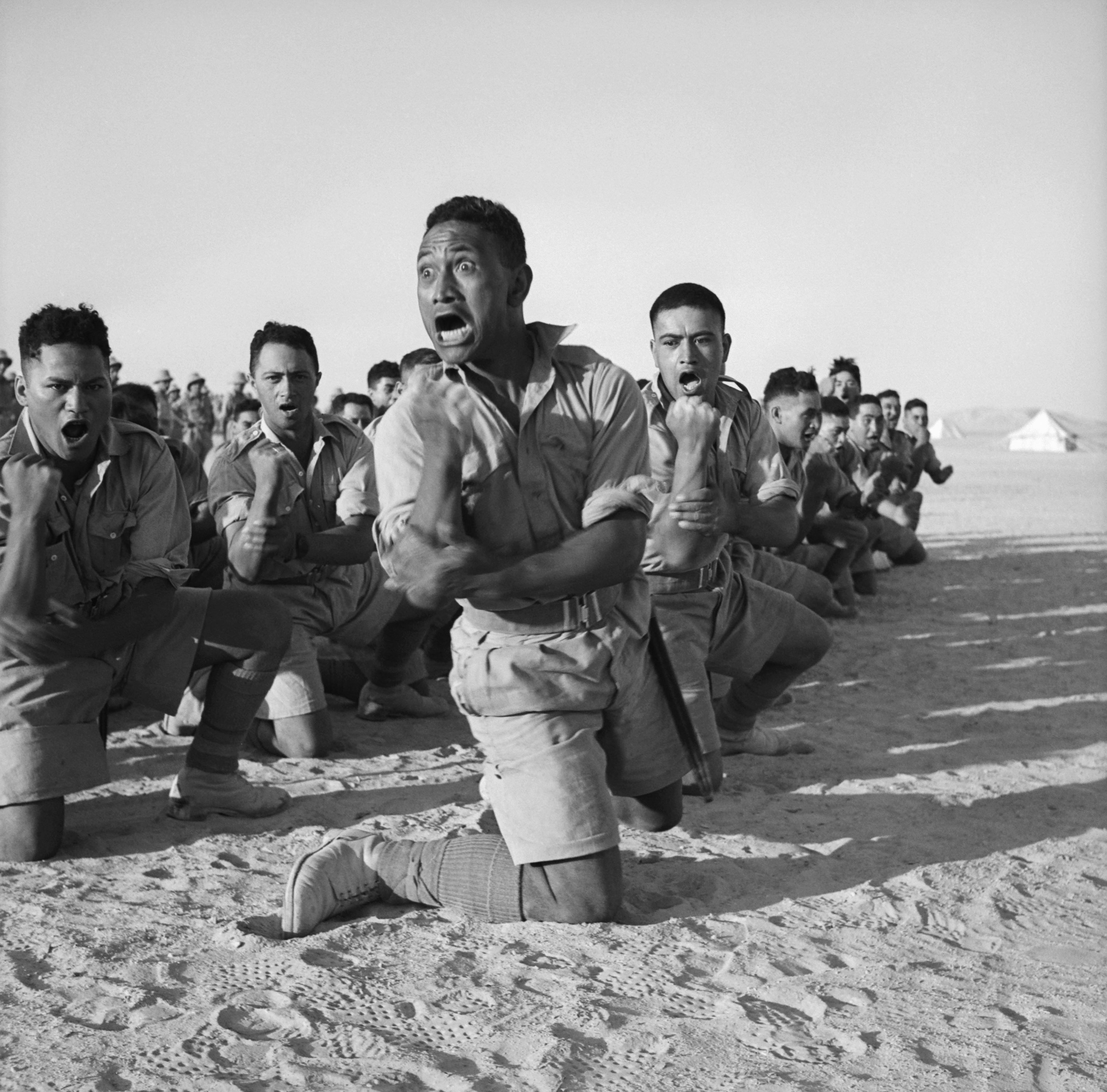
Māori Battalion haka in Egypt, 1941

In 1951, New Zealand, Australia, and the US signed the ANZUS Treaty. The influence of the United States on New Zealand weakened following protests over the Vietnam War, the refusal of the United States to admonish France after the sinking of the Rainbow Warrior, disagreements over environmental and agricultural trade issues, and New Zealand's nuclear-free policy. Despite the United States's suspension of ANZUS obligations, the treaty remained in effect between New Zealand and Australia, whose foreign policy has followed a similar historical trend. Close political contact is maintained between the two countries, with free trade agreements and travel arrangements that allow citizens to visit, live and work in both countries without restrictions. In 2013 there were about 650,000 New Zealand citizens living in Australia, which is equivalent to 15% of the population of New Zealand.

New Zealand has a strong presence among the Pacific Island countries, and enjoys strong diplomatic relations with Samoa, Fiji, and Tonga, and among smaller nations. A large proportion of New Zealand's aid goes to these countries, and many Pacific people migrate to New Zealand for employment. The increase of this since the 1960s led to the formation of the Pasifika New Zealander pan-ethnic group, the fourth-largest ethnic grouping in the country. Permanent migration is regulated under the 1970 Samoan Quota Scheme and the 2002 Pacific Access Category, which allow up to 1,100 Samoan nationals and up to 750 other Pacific Islanders respectively to become permanent New Zealand residents each year. A seasonal workers scheme for temporary migration was introduced in 2007, and in 2009 about 8,000 Pacific Islanders were employed under it. New Zealand is involved in the Pacific Islands Forum, the Pacific Community, Asia-Pacific Economic Cooperation, and the Association of Southeast Asian Nations Regional Forum (including the East Asia Summit). New Zealand has been described as a middle power in the Asia-Pacific region, and an emerging power. The country is a member of the United Nations, the Commonwealth of Nations and the Organisation for Economic Co-operation and Development (OECD), and participates in the Five Power Defence Arrangements.

Today, New Zealand enjoys particularly close relations with the United States and is one of its major non-NATO allies, as well as with Australia, with a "Trans-Tasman" identity between citizens of the latter being common. New Zealand is a member of the Five Eyes intelligence sharing agreement, known formally as the UKUSA Agreement. The five members of this agreement comprise the core Anglosphere: Australia, Canada, New Zealand, the United Kingdom, and the United States. Since 2012, New Zealand has had a partnership arrangement with NATO under the Partnership Interoperability Initiative. According to the 2024 Global Peace Index, New Zealand is the 4th most peaceful country in the world.

=== Military ===
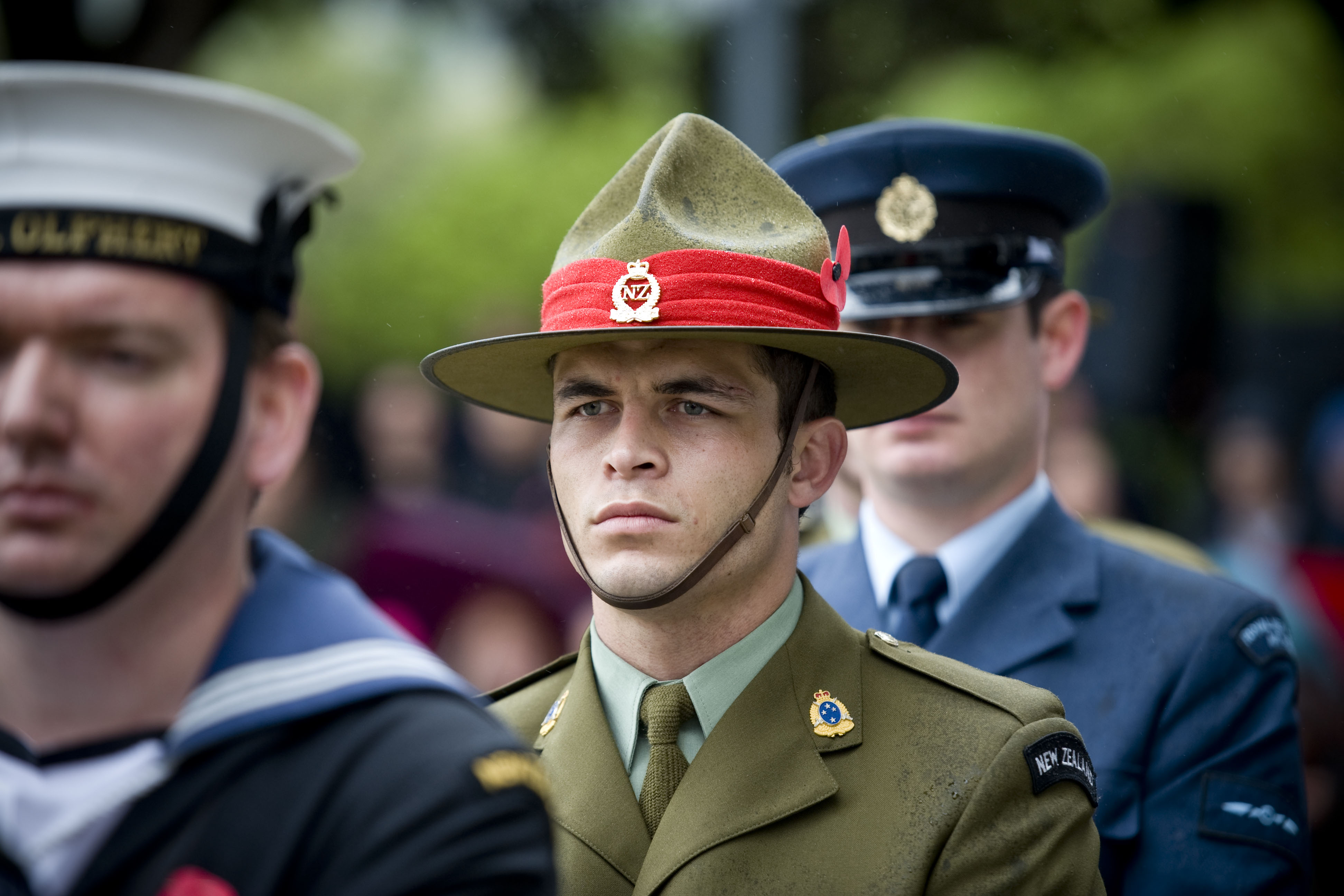
Anzac Day service at the National War Memorial

New Zealand's military services—the New Zealand Defence Force—comprise the New Zealand Army, the Royal New Zealand Air Force and the Royal New Zealand Navy. New Zealand's national defence needs are modest since a direct attack is unlikely. However, its military has had a global presence. The country fought in both world wars, with notable campaigns in Gallipoli, Crete, El Alamein, and Monte Cassino. The Gallipoli campaign played an important part in fostering New Zealand's national identity and strengthened the ANZAC tradition it shares with Australia.

In addition the two world wars, New Zealand fought in the Second Boer War, the Korean War, the Malayan Emergency, the Vietnam War, the Gulf War, and the Afghanistan War. It has contributed forces to several regional and global peacekeeping missions, such as those in Cyprus, Somalia, Bosnia and Herzegovina, the Sinai, Angola, Cambodia, the Iran–Iraq border, Bougainville, East Timor, and the Solomon Islands.

== Economy ==
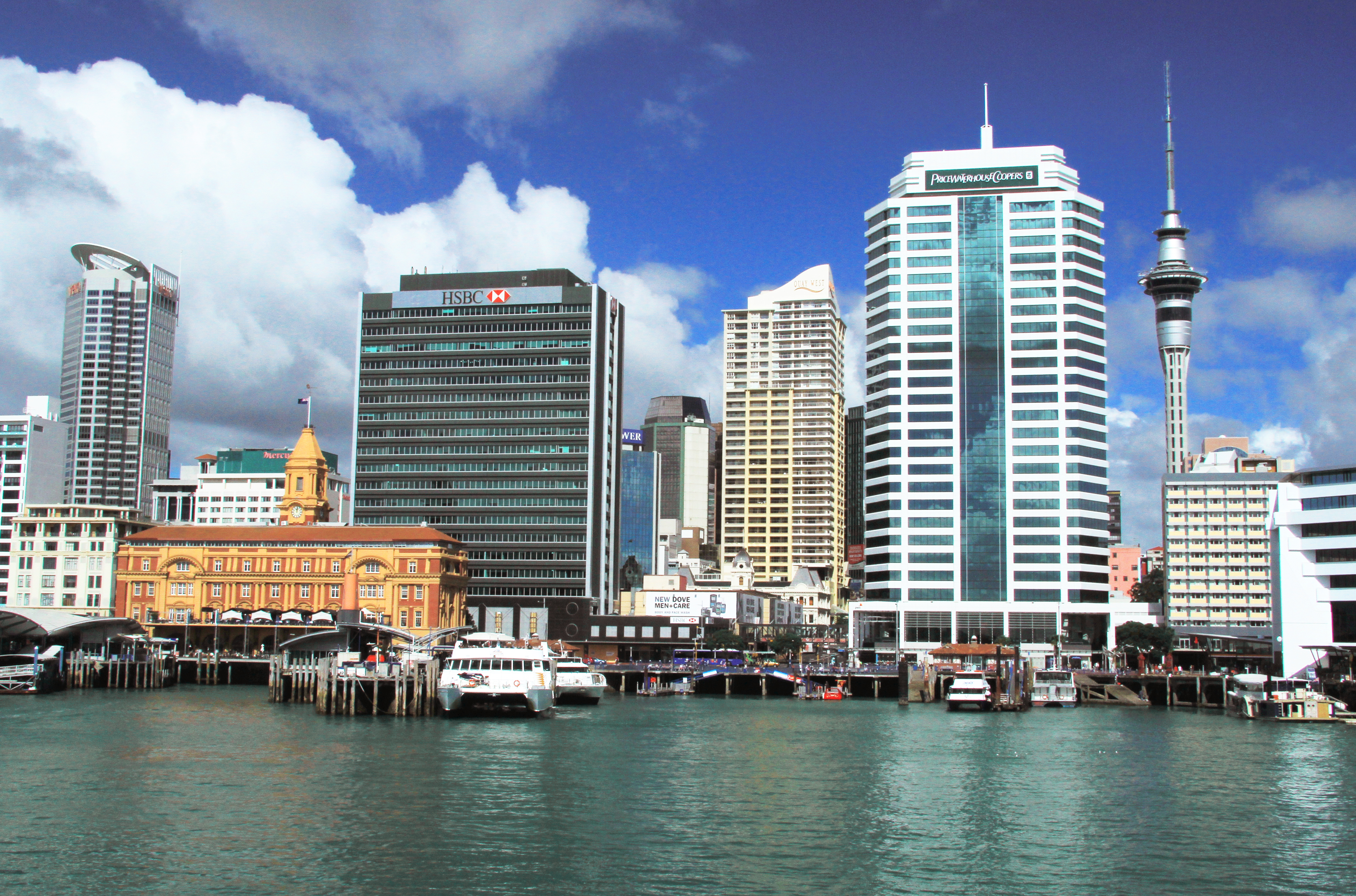
Waterfront along Auckland CBD, a major hub of economic activity

New Zealand has an advanced market economy, ranked 16th in the 2022 Human Development Index, and fourth in the 2022 Index of Economic Freedom. It is a high-income economy with a nominal gross domestic product (GDP) per capita (in United States dollar equivalents) of $48,071 as of 2023.The currency is the New Zealand dollar, informally known as the "Kiwi dollar"; it also circulates in the Cook Islands (see Cook Islands dollar), Niue, Tokelau, and the Pitcairn Islands.

Historically, extractive industries have contributed strongly to New Zealand's economy, focusing at different times on sealing, whaling, flax, gold, kauri gum, and native timber. The first shipment of refrigerated meat on the Dunedin in 1882 led to the establishment of meat and dairy exports to Britain, a trade which provided the basis for strong economic growth in New Zealand. High demand for agricultural products from the United Kingdom and the United States helped New Zealanders achieve higher living standards than both Australia and Western Europe in the 1950s and 1960s. In 1973, New Zealand's export market was reduced when the United Kingdom joined the European Economic Community and other compounding factors, such as the 1973 oil and 1979 energy crises, led to a severe economic depression. Living standards in New Zealand fell behind those of Australia and Western Europe, and by 1982 New Zealand had the lowest per-capita income of all the developed nations surveyed by the World Bank. In the mid-1980s New Zealand deregulated its agricultural sector by phasing out subsidies over a three-year period. Since 1984, successive governments engaged in major macroeconomic restructuring (known first as Rogernomics and then Ruthanasia), rapidly transforming New Zealand from a protectionist and highly regulated economy to a liberalised free-trade economy.

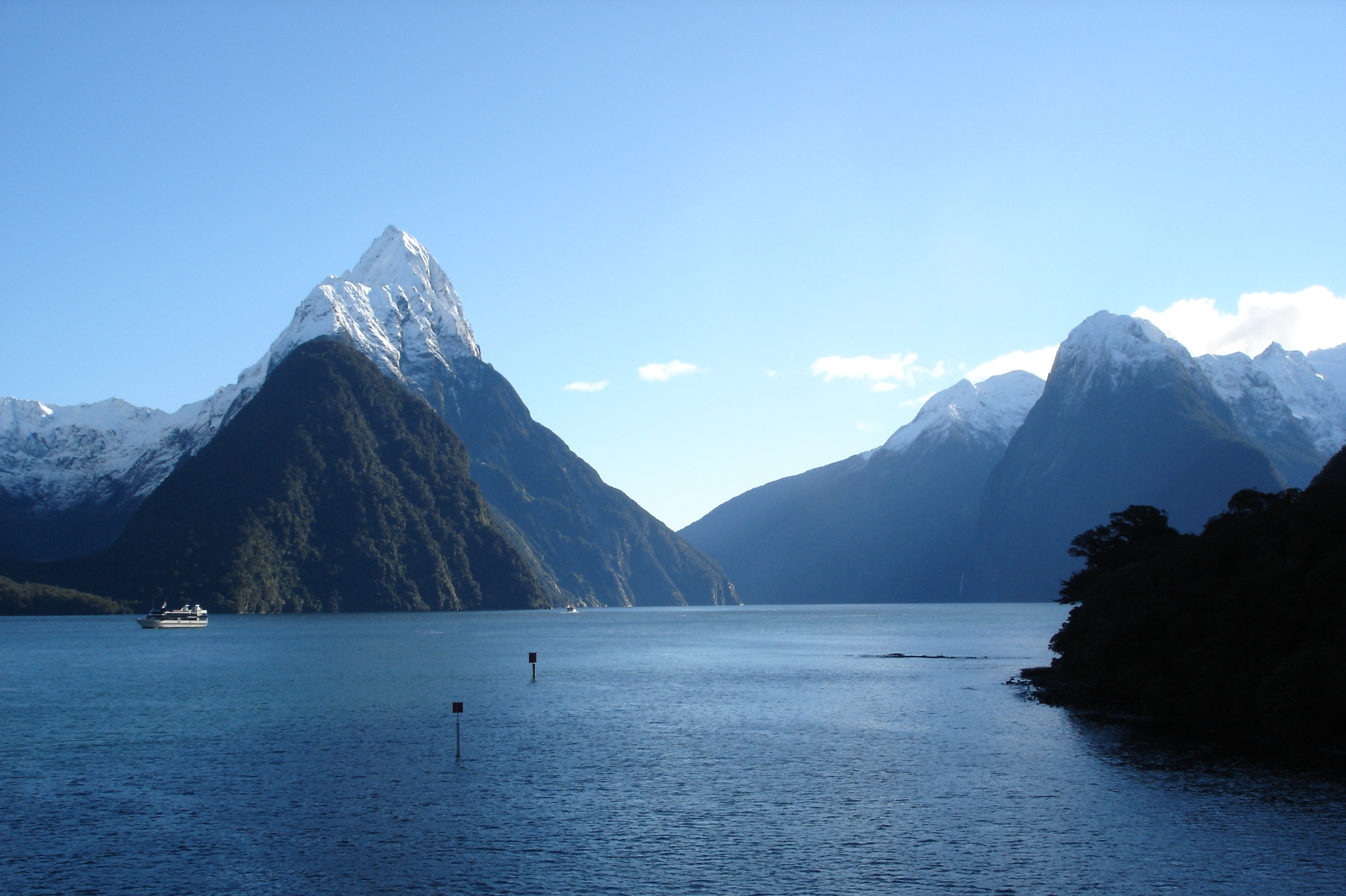
Milford Sound / Piopiotahi is one of New Zealand's most famous tourist destinations.

Unemployment peaked just above 10% in 1991 and 1992, following the 1987 share market crash, but eventually fell to 3.7% in 2007 (ranking third from twenty-seven comparable OECD nations). However, the 2008 financial crisis had a major effect on New Zealand, with the GDP shrinking for five consecutive quarters, the longest recession in over thirty years, and unemployment rising back to 7% in late 2009. The lowest unemployment rate recorded using the current methodology was in December 2021 during the COVID-19 pandemic, at 3.2%. Unemployment rates for different age groups follow similar trends but are consistently higher among youth. During the September 2025 quarter, the general unemployment rate was around 5.3%, while the unemployment rate for youth aged 15 to 24 was 15.2%. New Zealand has experienced a series of "brain drains" since the 1970s that still continue today. Nearly one-quarter of highly skilled workers live overseas, mostly in Australia and Britain, which is the largest proportion from any developed nation. In recent decades, however, a "brain gain" has brought in educated professionals from Europe and less developed countries. Today New Zealand's economy benefits from a high level of innovation.

Poverty in New Zealand is characterised by growing income inequality; wealth in New Zealand is highly concentrated, with the top 1% of the population owning 16% of the country's wealth, and the richest 5% owning 38%, leaving a stark contrast where half the population, including state beneficiaries and pensioners, receive less than $24,000. Moreover, child poverty in New Zealand has been identified by the government as a major societal issue; the country has 12.0% of children living in low-income households that have less than 50% of the median equivalised disposable household income as of June 2022. Poverty has a disproportionately high effect in ethnic-minority households, with a quarter (23.3%) of Māori children and almost a third (28.6%) of Pacific Islander children living in poverty as of 2020.

=== Trade ===
New Zealand is heavily dependent on international trade, particularly in agricultural products. Exports account for 24% of its output, making New Zealand vulnerable to international commodity prices and global economic slowdowns. Food products made up 55% of the value of all the country's exports in 2014; wood was the second largest earner (7%). New Zealand's main trading partners, as at June 2018, are China (NZ$27.8b), Australia ($26.2b), the European Union ($22.9b), the United States ($17.6b), and Japan ($8.4b). On 7 April 2008, New Zealand and China signed the New Zealand–China Free Trade Agreement, the first such agreement China has signed with a developed country. In July 2023, New Zealand and the European Union entered into the EU–New Zealand Free Trade Agreement, which eliminated tariffs on several goods traded between the two regions. This free trade agreement expanded on the pre-existing free trade agreement and saw a reduction in tariffs on meat and dairy in response to feedback from the affected industries.

The service sector is the largest sector in the economy, followed by manufacturing and construction and then farming and raw material extraction. Tourism plays a significant role in the economy, contributing $12.9 billion (or 5.6%) to New Zealand's total GDP and supporting 7.5% of the total workforce in 2016.

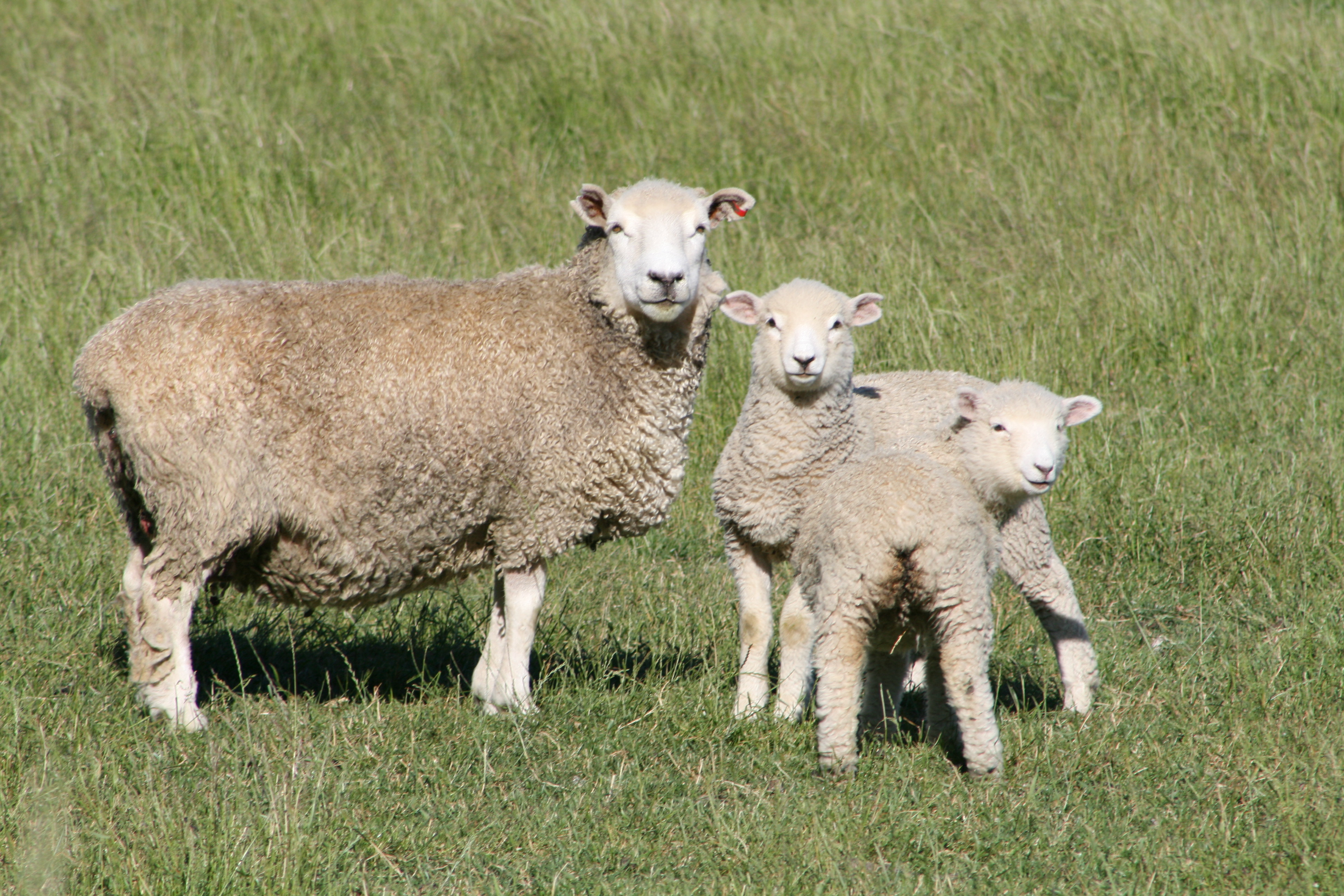
Wool has historically been one of New Zealand's major exports.

Wool was New Zealand's major agricultural export during the late 19th century. Even as late as the 1960s it made up over a third of all export revenues, but since then its price has steadily dropped relative to other commodities, and wool is no longer profitable for many farmers. In contrast, dairy farming increased, with the number of dairy cows doubling between 1990 and 2007, to become New Zealand's largest export earner. In the year to June 2018, dairy products accounted for 17.7% ($14.1 billion) of total exports, and the country's largest company, Fonterra, controls almost one-third of the international dairy trade. Other exports in 2017–18 were meat (8.8%), wood and wood products (6.2%), fruit (3.6%), machinery (2.2%) and wine (2.1%). New Zealand's wine industry has followed a similar trend to dairy, the number of vineyards doubling over the same period, overtaking wool exports for the first time in 2007.

=== Infrastructure ===
In 2025, renewable energy reached a new record, generating 47.7% of New Zealand's gross energy supply, up from 45.6% in 2024. The majority of the country's electricity supply is generated from hydroelectric power, with major schemes on the Waikato, Waitaki and Clutha / Mata-Au rivers, as well as at Manapouri. Geothermal power is also a significant generator of electricity, with several large stations located across the Taupō Volcanic Zone in the North Island. The four main companies in the generation and retail market are Contact Energy, Genesis Energy, Mercury Energy and Meridian Energy. State-owned Transpower operates the high-voltage transmission grids in the North and South Islands, as well as the Inter-Island HVDC link connecting the two together.

The provision of water supply and sanitation is generally of good quality. Regional authorities provide water abstraction, treatment and distribution infrastructure to most developed areas.

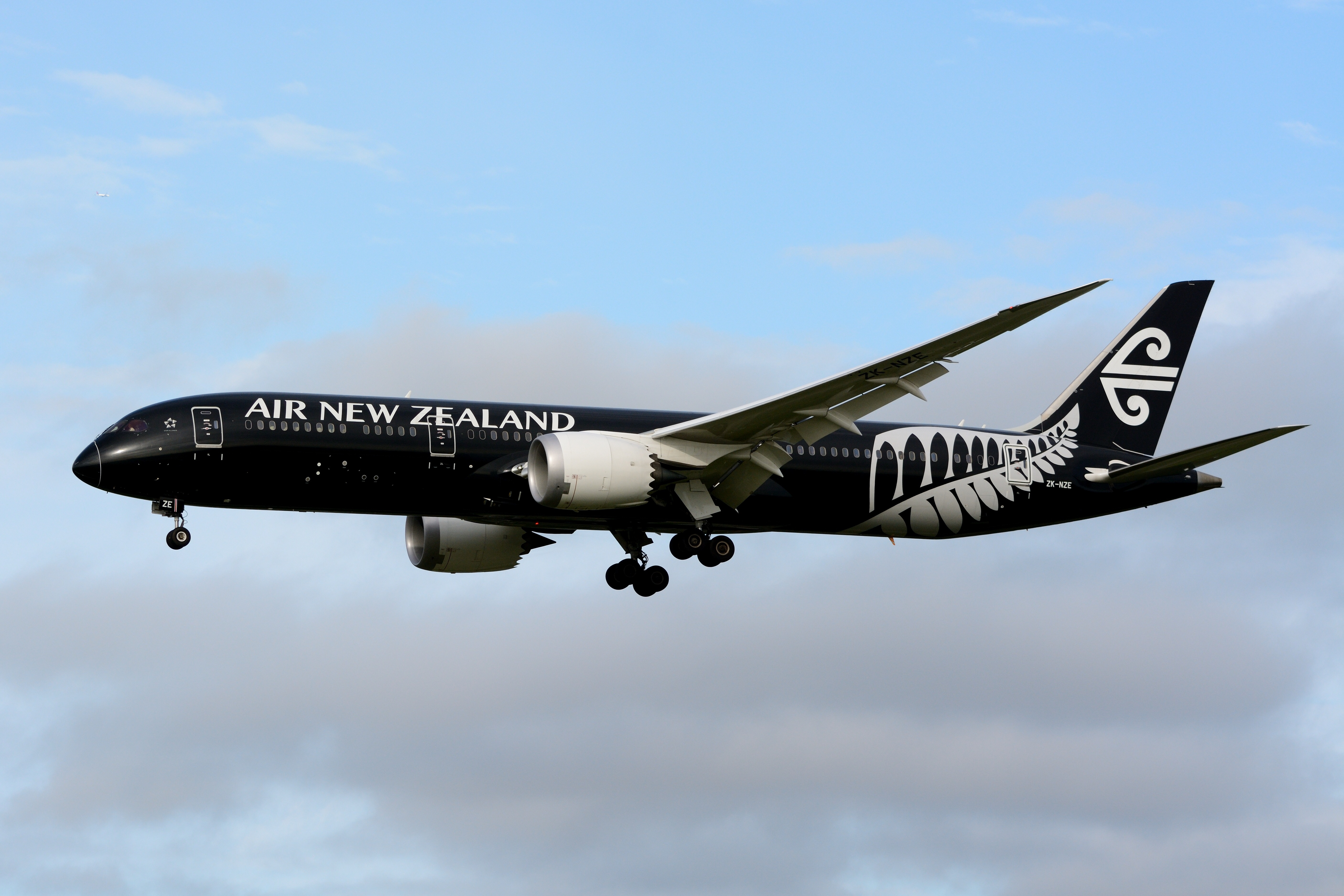
A Boeing 787-9 Dreamliner of Air New Zealand, the flag carrier of New Zealand

New Zealand's transport network comprises 94,000 kilometres (58,410 mi) of roads, including 199 kilometres (124 mi) of motorways, and 4,128 kilometres (2,565 mi) of railway lines. Most major cities and towns are linked by bus services, although the private car is the predominant mode of transport. The country's railways were privatised in 1993 but were re-nationalised by the government in stages between 2004 and 2008. The state-owned enterprise KiwiRail now operates the railways, with the exception of commuter services in Auckland and Wellington, which are operated by Auckland One Rail and Transdev Wellington respectively. Railways run the length of the country, although most lines now carry freight rather than passengers. The road and rail networks in the two main islands are linked by roll-on/roll-off ferries between Wellington and Picton, operated by Interislander (part of KiwiRail) and Bluebridge. Most international visitors arrive via air. New Zealand has four international airports: Auckland, Christchurch, Queenstown and Wellington. Only Auckland and Christchurch have runways long enough for aircraft capable of long haul flights to Asia and the Americas.

The New Zealand Post Office had a monopoly over telecommunications in New Zealand until 1987 when Telecom New Zealand was formed, initially as a state-owned enterprise and then privatised in 1990. Chorus, which was split from Telecom (now Spark) in 2011, still owns the majority of the telecommunications infrastructure, but competition from other providers has increased. A large-scale rollout of gigabit-capable fibre to the premises, branded as Ultra-Fast Broadband, began in 2009 with a target of being available to 87% of the population by 2022. As of 2017, the United Nations International Telecommunication Union ranks New Zealand 13th in the development of information and communications infrastructure.

=== Science and technology ===
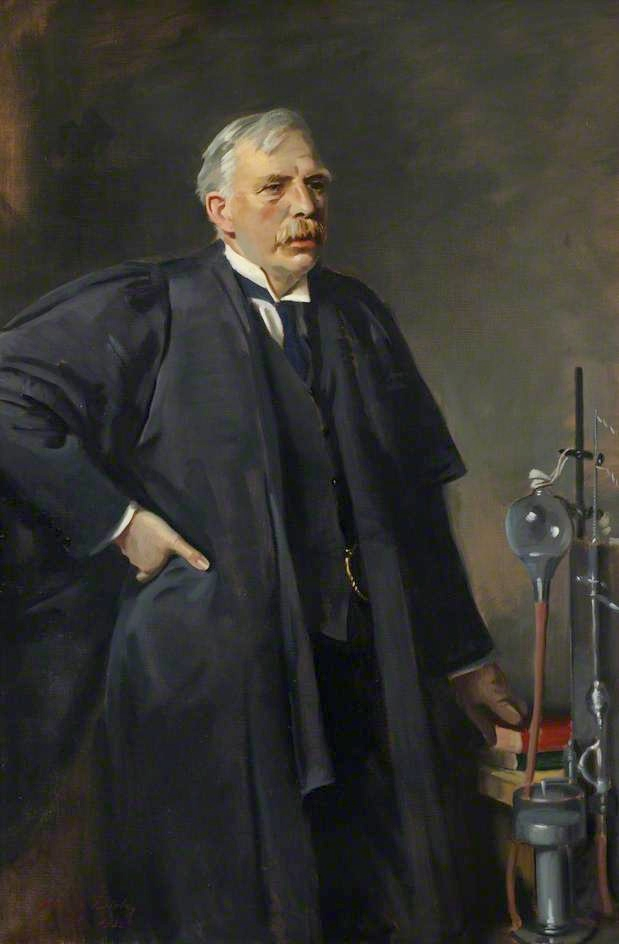
New Zealand physicist Ernest Rutherford has been described as "the father of nuclear physics".

The accumulation of knowledge of agricultural practice and the effects of herbal remedies in the treatment of illness and disease by Māori tohunga as well as their precise observation of nature might be considered an indigenous contribution to science in New Zealand. Cook's voyages in the 1700s and Darwin's in 1835 had important scientific botanical and zoological objectives. The establishment of universities in the 19th century fostered scientific discoveries by notable New Zealanders including Ernest Rutherford for splitting the atom, William Pickering for rocket science, Maurice Wilkins for helping discover DNA, Beatrice Tinsley for galaxy formation, Archibald McIndoe for plastic surgery, Sydney Smith for forensics and Alan MacDiarmid for conducting polymers.

Crown Research Institutes (CRIs) were formed in 1992 from existing government-owned research organisations. Their role is to research and develop new science, knowledge, products and services across the economic, environmental, social and cultural spectrum for the benefit of New Zealand. The total gross expenditure on research and development (R&D) as a proportion of GDP rose to 1.37% in 2018, up from 1.23% in 2015. New Zealand ranks 21st in the OECD for its gross R&D spending as a percentage of GDP. New Zealand was ranked 26th in the Global Innovation Index in 2025.

The New Zealand Space Agency was created by the government in 2016 for space policy, regulation and sector development. Rocket Lab was the first commercial rocket launcher in the country.

Most private and commercial research organisations in New Zealand focus on the agricultural and fisheries sectors. Examples include the Cawthron Institute, the Livestock Improvement Corporation, the Fonterra Research and Development Centre, the Bragato Research Institute, the Kiwifruit Breeding Centre, and B+LNZ Genetics.

== Demographics ==
Population pyramid (2017)

The 2023 New Zealand census enumerated a resident population of 4,993,923, an increase of 6.3% over the 2018 census figure. As of November 2026, the total population has risen to an estimated 5,361,040. New Zealand's population increased at a rate of 1.9% per year in the seven years ended June 2020. In September 2020 Statistics New Zealand reported that the population had climbed above 5 million people in September 2019, according to population estimates based on the 2018 census. (Note: A provisional estimate initially indicated the milestone was reached six months later in March 2020, before population estimates were rebased from the 2013 census to the 2018 census.)

New Zealand's population today is concentrated to the north of the country, with around 76.4% of the population living in the North Island and 23.6% in the South Island as of June 2025. During the 20th century, New Zealand's population drifted north. In 1921, the country's median centre of population was in the Tasman Sea west of Levin in Manawatū-Whanganui; by 2017, it had moved 280 km (170 mi) north to near Kawhia in Waikato.

New Zealand is a predominantly urban country, with 84.5% of the population living in urban areas and 51.4% in the seven cities with populations exceeding 100,000. Auckland, with over 1.4 million residents, is by far the largest city. New Zealand cities generally rank highly on international livability measures. For instance, in 2024, Auckland was ranked the world's fifth most liveable city and Wellington the fourteenth by the Mercer Quality of Living Survey.

The median age of the New Zealand population at the 2023 census was 38.1 years, up from 37.4 years in the 2018 census with life expectancy in 2022–2024 being 80.1 years for males and 83.5 years for females. While New Zealand is experiencing sub-replacement fertility, with a total fertility rate of 1.6 in 2020, the fertility rate is above the OECD average. By 2050, the median age is projected to rise to 43 years and the percentage of people 60 years of age and older to rise from 18% to 29%.

Largest cities or towns in New Zealand Statistics New Zealand June 2025 estimate (SSGA18 boundaries)
Rank	Name	Region	Pop.	Rank	Name	Region	Pop.
1	Auckland	Auckland	1,547,200	11	New Plymouth	Taranaki	60,200
2	Christchurch	Canterbury	407,800	12	Porirua	Wellington	60,100
3	Wellington	Wellington	209,800	13	Rotorua	Bay of Plenty	58,500
4	Hamilton	Waikato	192,100	14	Whangārei	Northland	56,100
5	Tauranga	Bay of Plenty	160,900	15	Invercargill	Southland	51,200
6	Lower Hutt	Wellington	113,200	16	Nelson	Nelson	50,800
7	Dunedin	Otago	104,000	17	Hastings	Hawke's Bay	49,800
8	Palmerston North	Manawatū-Whanganui	81,200	18	Upper Hutt	Wellington	44,500
9	Hibiscus Coast	Auckland	67,800	19	Whanganui	Manawatū-Whanganui	42,800
10	Napier	Hawke's Bay	66,400	20	Gisborne	Gisborne	38,100

=== Ethnicity and immigration ===
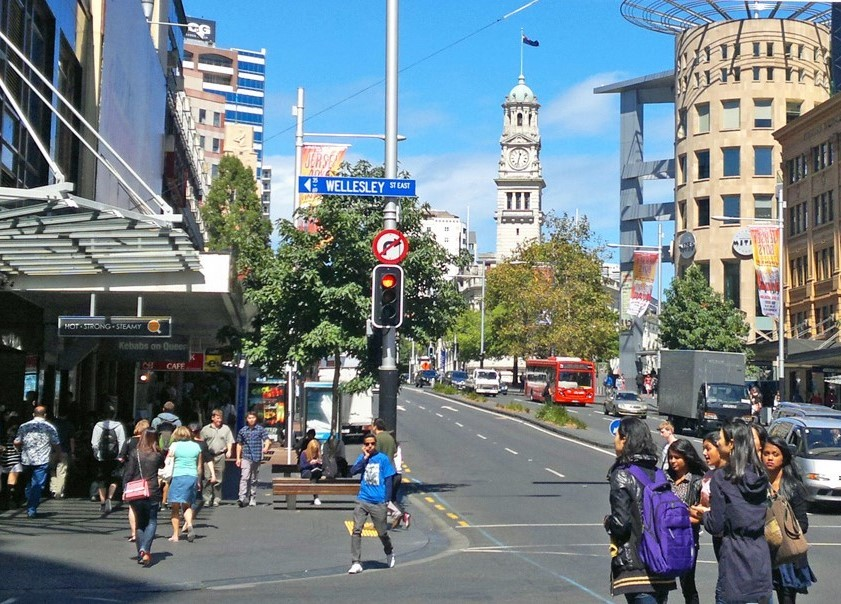
Pedestrians on Queen Street in Auckland, an ethnically diverse city

In the 2023 census, 62.1% of residents responded as being ethnically New Zealand European, and 17.8% responded as being ethnically Māori. Other major ethnicities include Chinese (5.2%), Indian (5.1%), Samoan (4.3%), Filipino (2.2%), Tongan (2.0%), Cook Islands Maori (1.9%), and English (1.4%) 13.2% responded with multiple ethnicities, with 8.2% alone responding as both European and Māori. Statistics New Zealand allows people to choose multiple ethnicities and reports ethnic data based on total responses, therefore ethnicities add up to more than 100%. For legacy systems which can only accept one ethnicity, people are usually allocated to a single ethnicity based on a pre-determined priority order, with Māori given highest priority and New Zealand European given lowest priority.

The population has become more multicultural and diverse in recent decades: in 1961, the census reported that the population of New Zealand was 92% European and 7% Māori, with Asian and Pacific minorities sharing the remaining 1%. However, New Zealand's non-European population is disproportionately concentrated in the North Island and especially in the Auckland Region: while Auckland is home to 33% of New Zealand's population, it is home to 62% of the country's Pasifika population and 60% of its Asian population.

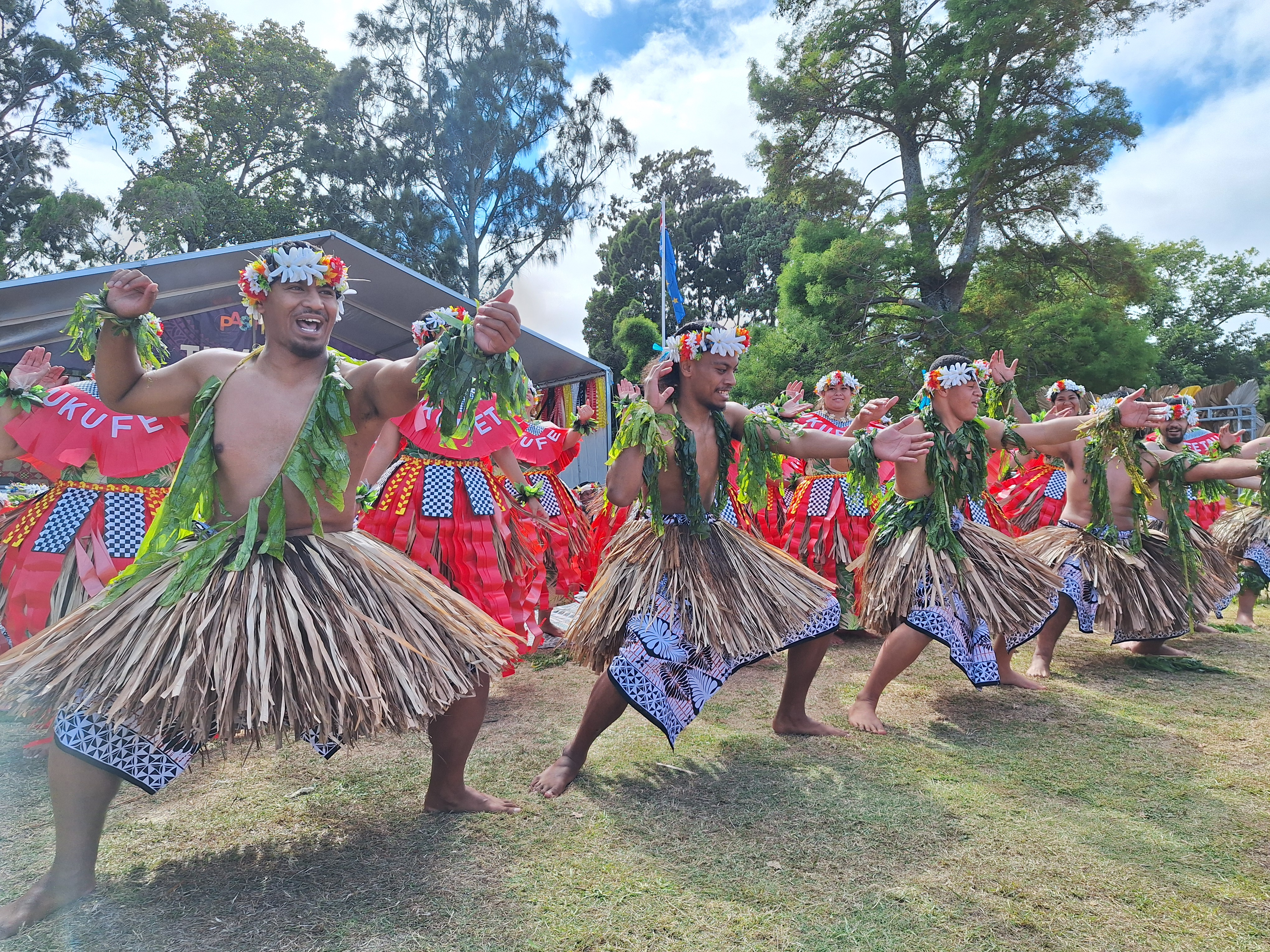
Pasifika Festival celebrating Pasifika New Zealanders and their pan-cultural identity

While the demonym for a New Zealand citizen is New Zealander, the informal "Kiwi" is commonly used both internationally and by locals. The Māori loanword Pākehā has been used to refer to New Zealanders of European descent, although some reject this name. The word today is increasingly used to refer to all non-Polynesian New Zealanders.

The Māori were the first people to reach New Zealand, followed by the early European settlers. Following colonisation, immigrants were predominantly from Britain, Ireland and Australia because of restrictive policies similar to the White Australia policy. There was also significant Dutch, Dalmatian, German, and Italian immigration, together with indirect European immigration through Australia, North America, South America and South Africa. Net migration increased after the Second World War; in the 1970s and 1980s policies on immigration were relaxed, and immigration from Asia was promoted. In 2009–10, an annual target of 45,000–50,000 permanent residence approvals was set by the New Zealand Immigration Service—more than one new migrant for every 100 New Zealand residents.

In the 2023 census, 28.8% of people counted were not born in New Zealand, up from 27.4% in the 2018 census. The most popular countries of origin for overseas-born residents were England (14.6%), mainland China (10.2%), India (10.0%), the Philippines (7.0%), South Africa (6.7%), Australia (6.1%), Fiji (4.8%) and Samoa (4.3%). The number of fee-paying international students and international exchange students increased sharply in the late 1990s, with more than 20,000 studying in public tertiary institutions in 2002. New Zealand achieved a record net migration gain of 135,500 people in the year ended October 2023. Immigrants from India, China and the Philippines are the largest contributors to New Zealand's population growth.

In 2025, New Zealand's net migration fell to its lowest level in more than a decade. According to Statistics New Zealand, the country recorded a net migration gain of 14,200 in 2025, down 9,600 from a year earlier. That marked the smallest annual increase since 2013, outside 2021, when borders were largely closed during the COVID-19 outbreak.

=== Language ===
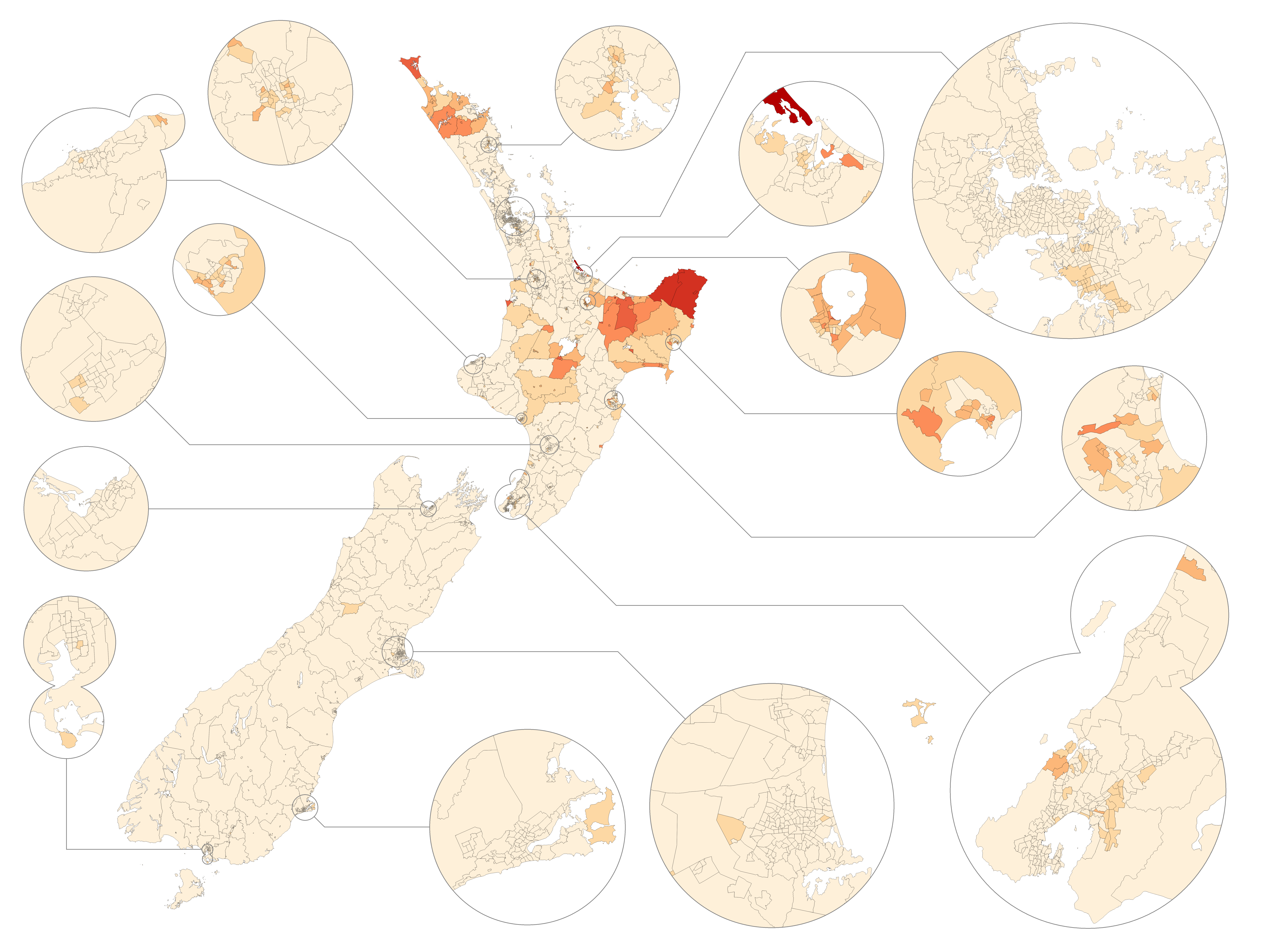
Speakers of Māori according to the 2013 census: Less than 5% More than 5% More than 10% More than 20% More than 30% More than 40% More than 50%

English is the predominant language in New Zealand, spoken by 95.4% of the population. New Zealand English has a distinctive accent and lexicon. It is similar to Australian English, and many speakers from the Northern Hemisphere are unable to tell the accents apart. The most prominent differences between New Zealand English and other English dialects are the shifts in the short front vowels: the short-i sound (as in kit) has centralised towards the schwa sound (the a in comma and about); the short-e sound (as in dress) has moved towards the short-i sound; and the short-a sound (as in trap) has moved to the short-e sound.

After World War II, Māori were discouraged or prohibited to speak their own language (te reo Māori) in schools and workplaces, and it existed as a community language only in a few remote areas. The Native Schools Act 1867 required instruction in English in all schools, and while no official policy banned children from speaking Māori, many suffered physical abuse if they did. The Māori language has recently undergone a process of revitalisation, being declared one of New Zealand's official languages in 1987, and is spoken by 4.0% of the population. (Note: In 2015, 55% of Māori adults (aged 15 years and over) reported knowledge of te reo Māori. Of these speakers, 64% use Māori at home and 50,000 can speak the language "very well" or "well".) Māori-language immersion schools and two Māori-language television channels now exist. Many places have both their Māori and English names officially recognised.

As recorded in the 2018 census, Samoan is the most widely spoken non-official language (2.2%), followed by "Northern Chinese" (including Mandarin, 2.0%), Hindi (1.5%), and French (1.2%). New Zealand Sign Language was reported to be understood by 22,986 people (0.5%); it became one of New Zealand's official languages in 2006.

=== Religion ===
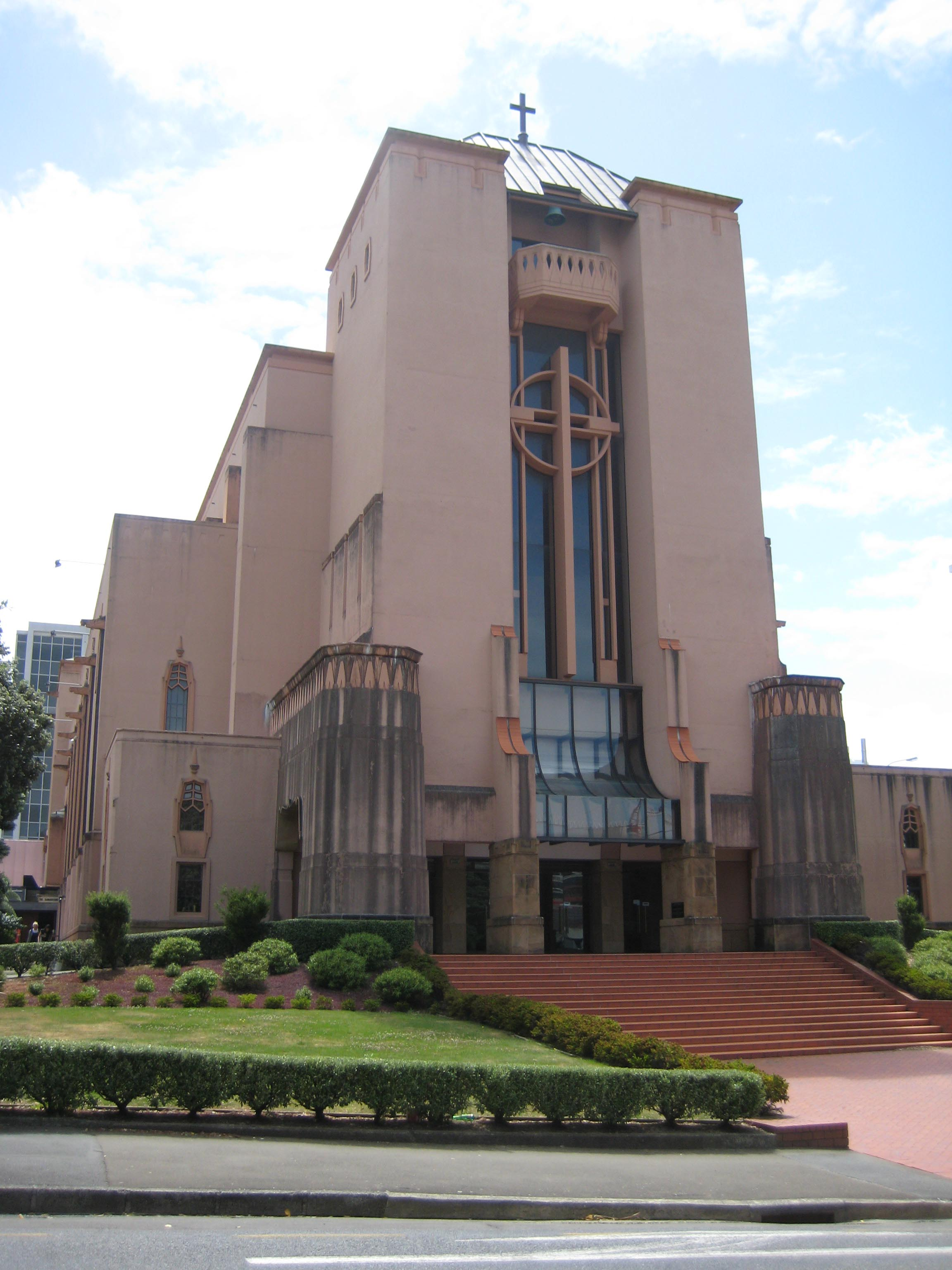
The Wellington Cathedral of St Paul in Wellington

According to the 2023 census, 51.6% of the "census usually resident population" had no religion, up from 48.2% in 2018 census. Christians are the single largest religious group, forming 32.3% of the population, compared to 36.5% in 2018. Hindus are the second largest religious minority, forming the 2.9% of population, followed by Muslims on 1.5%. The Auckland Region exhibited the greatest religious diversity.

=== Education ===
Primary and secondary schooling is compulsory for children aged 6 to 16, with the majority of children attending from the age of 5. There are 13 school years and attending state (public) schools is free to New Zealand citizens and permanent residents from a person's 5th birthday to the end of the calendar year following their 19th birthday. New Zealand has an adult literacy rate of 99%, and over half of the population aged 15 to 29 hold a tertiary qualification.

There are five types of government-owned tertiary institutions: universities, colleges of education, polytechnics, specialist colleges, and wānanga, in addition to private training establishments. In 2021, in the population aged 25–64, 13% had no formal qualification, 21% had a school qualification, 28% had a tertiary certificate or diploma, and 35% have a bachelor's degree or higher. The OECD's Programme for International Student Assessment ranks New Zealand as the 28th best in the OECD for maths, 13th best for science, and 11th best for reading.

=== Health ===
As of 2023, New Zealand allocated about 9.6 percent of its GDP to healthcare, slightly above the OECD average of 8.8 percent. The public healthcare system operates under a publicly funded health insurance model that supports inpatient and outpatient services at public hospitals, along with preventive and primary care through private providers. Health New Zealand – Te Whatu Ora is the primary publicly funded healthcare system of New Zealand. The New Zealand Government established it to replace the country's 20 district health boards (DHBs) on 1 July 2022. Health New Zealand is charged with working alongside the Public Health Agency to manage the provision of healthcare services in New Zealand. As of 2022, the agency is New Zealand's largest employer, consolidating the DHBs' combined work force of 80,000, with an estimated annual operating budget of NZ$20 billion and an asset base of about NZ$24 billion. Ischaemic heart disease is the leading cause of death, followed by Alzheimer disease and other dementias, and stroke. The life expectancy has improved from 78.6 years in 2000 to 82.2 years in 2021.

== Culture ==
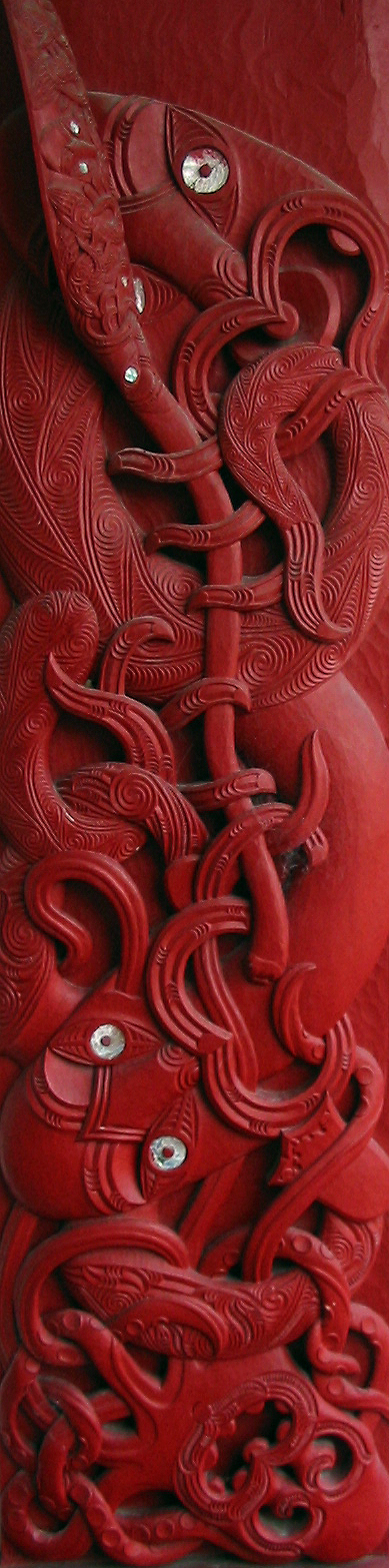
Late 20th-century house-post depicting the navigator Kupe fighting two sea creatures

Statistics have shown around 20% of New Zealanders identify with more than one ethnic group. Around 80% are of European descent, 15% Maori, and others coming from China, the Pacific Islands and elsewhere. This means there is little sense in talking of one New Zealand culture, although, according to one writer, "New Zealanders will argue strongly for the existence of a unique identity, for the existence of something that sets them apart from others, a "Kiwi culture"."

The British and Irish immigrants brought aspects of their own culture to New Zealand and also influenced Māori culture, particularly with the introduction of Christianity. However, Māori still regard their allegiance to tribal groups as a vital part of their identity, and Māori kinship roles resemble those of other Polynesian peoples. More recently, American, Australian, Asian and other European cultures have exerted influence on New Zealand. Non-Māori Polynesian cultures are also apparent, with Pasifika, the world's largest Polynesian festival, now an annual event in Auckland.

The largely rural life in early New Zealand led to the image of New Zealanders as rugged, industrious problem solvers. Modesty was expected and enforced through the "tall poppy syndrome", where high achievers received harsh criticism. At the time, New Zealand was not known as an intellectual country. From the early 20th century until the late 1960s, Māori culture was suppressed by the attempted assimilation of Māori into British New Zealanders. In the 1960s, as tertiary education became more available, and cities expanded urban culture began to dominate, but rural imagery and themes are common in New Zealand's art, literature and media.

New Zealand's national symbols are influenced by natural, historical, and Māori sources. The silver fern emblem appears on army insignia and sporting team uniforms. Certain items of popular culture thought to be unique to New Zealand are called "Kiwiana".

=== Art ===
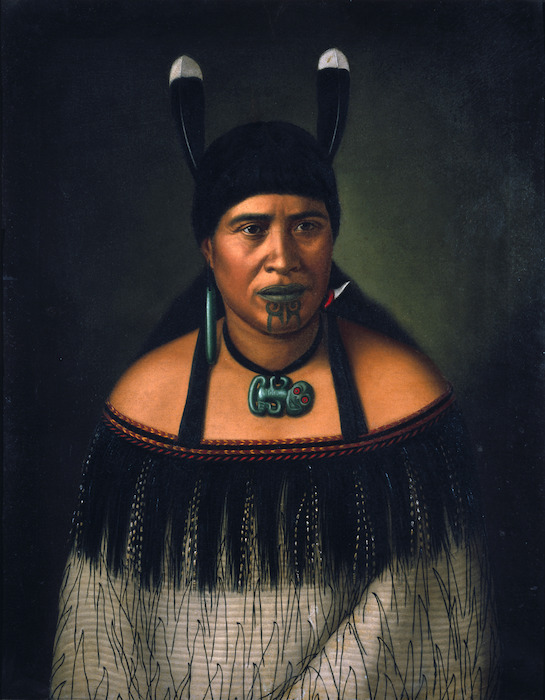
Portrait of Hinepare of Ngāti Kahungunu by Gottfried Lindauer, showing chin moko, pounamu hei-tiki and woven cloak

As part of the resurgence of Māori culture, the traditional crafts of carving and weaving are now more widely practised, and Māori artists are increasing in number and influence. Most Māori carvings feature human figures, generally with three fingers and either a natural-looking, detailed head or a stylised version. Surface patterns consisting of spirals, ridges, notches and fish scales decorate most carvings. The pre-eminent Māori architecture consisted of carved meeting houses (wharenui) decorated with symbolic carvings and illustrations. These buildings were originally designed to be constantly rebuilt, changing and adapting to different whims or needs.

Māori decorated the white wood of buildings, canoes and cenotaphs using red (a mixture of red ochre and shark fat) and black (made from soot) paint and painted pictures of birds, reptiles and other designs on cave walls. Māori tattoos (moko) consisting of coloured soot mixed with gum were cut into the flesh with a bone chisel. Since European arrival paintings and photographs have been dominated by landscapes, originally not as works of art but as factual portrayals of New Zealand. Portraits of Māori were also common, with early painters often portraying them as an ideal race untainted by civilisation. The country's isolation delayed the influence of European artistic trends allowing local artists to develop their own distinctive style of regionalism. During the 1960s and 1970s, many artists combined traditional Māori and Western techniques, creating unique art forms. New Zealand art and craft has gradually achieved an international audience, with exhibitions in the Venice Biennale in 2001 and the "Paradise Now" exhibition in New York in 2004.

Māori cloaks are made of fine flax fibre and patterned with black, red and white triangles, diamonds and other geometric shapes. Greenstone was fashioned into earrings and necklaces, with the most well-known design being the hei-tiki, a distorted human figure sitting cross-legged with its head tilted to the side. Europeans brought English fashion etiquette to New Zealand, and until the 1950s most people dressed up for social occasions. Standards have since relaxed and New Zealand fashion has received a reputation for being casual, practical and lacklustre. However, the local fashion industry has grown significantly since 2000, doubling exports and increasing from a handful to about 50 established labels, with some labels gaining international recognition.

=== Literature ===
Māori quickly adopted writing as a means of sharing ideas, and many of their oral stories and poems were converted to the written form. Most early English literature was obtained from Britain, and it was not until the 1950s when local publishing outlets increased that New Zealand literature started to become widely known. Although still largely influenced by global trends (modernism) and events (the Great Depression), writers in the 1930s began to develop stories increasingly focused on their experiences in New Zealand. During this period, literature changed from a journalistic activity to a more academic pursuit. Participation in the world wars gave some New Zealand writers a new perspective on New Zealand culture and with the postwar expansion of universities local literature flourished. Dunedin is a UNESCO City of Literature.

=== Media and entertainment ===
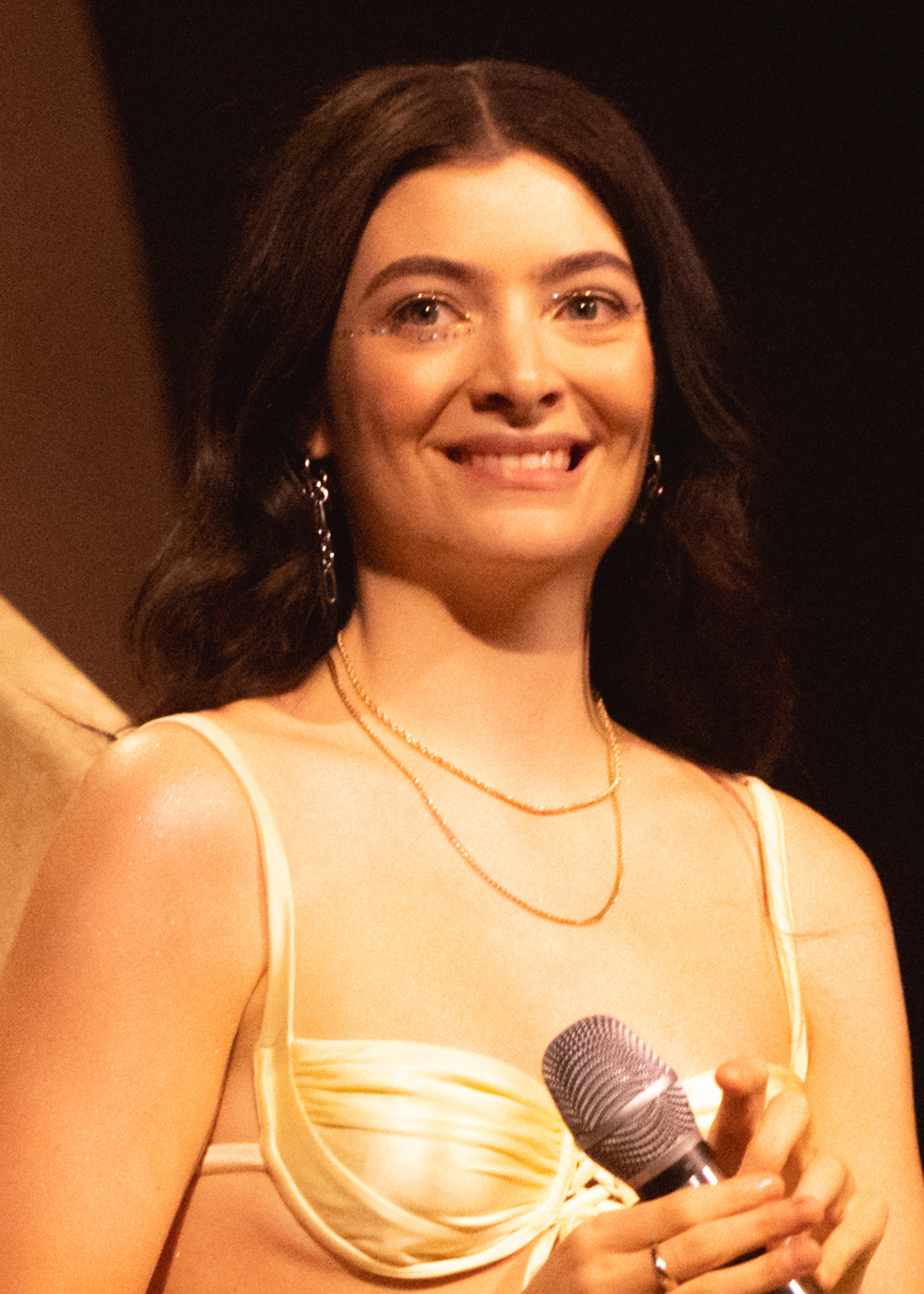
Lorde is one of the most internationally successful New Zealand artists.

New Zealand music has been influenced by blues, jazz, country, rock and roll and hip hop, with many of these genres given a unique New Zealand interpretation. Māori developed a varied musical tradition around songs and chants, including ceremonial performances, laments, and love songs. Instruments (taonga pūoro), such as flutes and percussion, began being used as spiritual tools, entertainment, and signalling devices. Early settlers brought over their ethnic music, with brass bands and choral music being popular, and musicians began touring New Zealand in the 1860s. Pipe bands became widespread during the early 20th century. The New Zealand recording industry began to develop from 1940 onwards, and many New Zealand musicians have obtained success in Britain and the United States. Some artists release Māori language songs, and the Māori tradition-based art of kapa haka (song and dance) has made a resurgence. The New Zealand Music Awards are held annually by Recorded Music NZ; the awards were first held in 1965 by Reckitt & Colman as the Loxene Golden Disc awards. Recorded Music NZ also publishes the country's official weekly record charts.

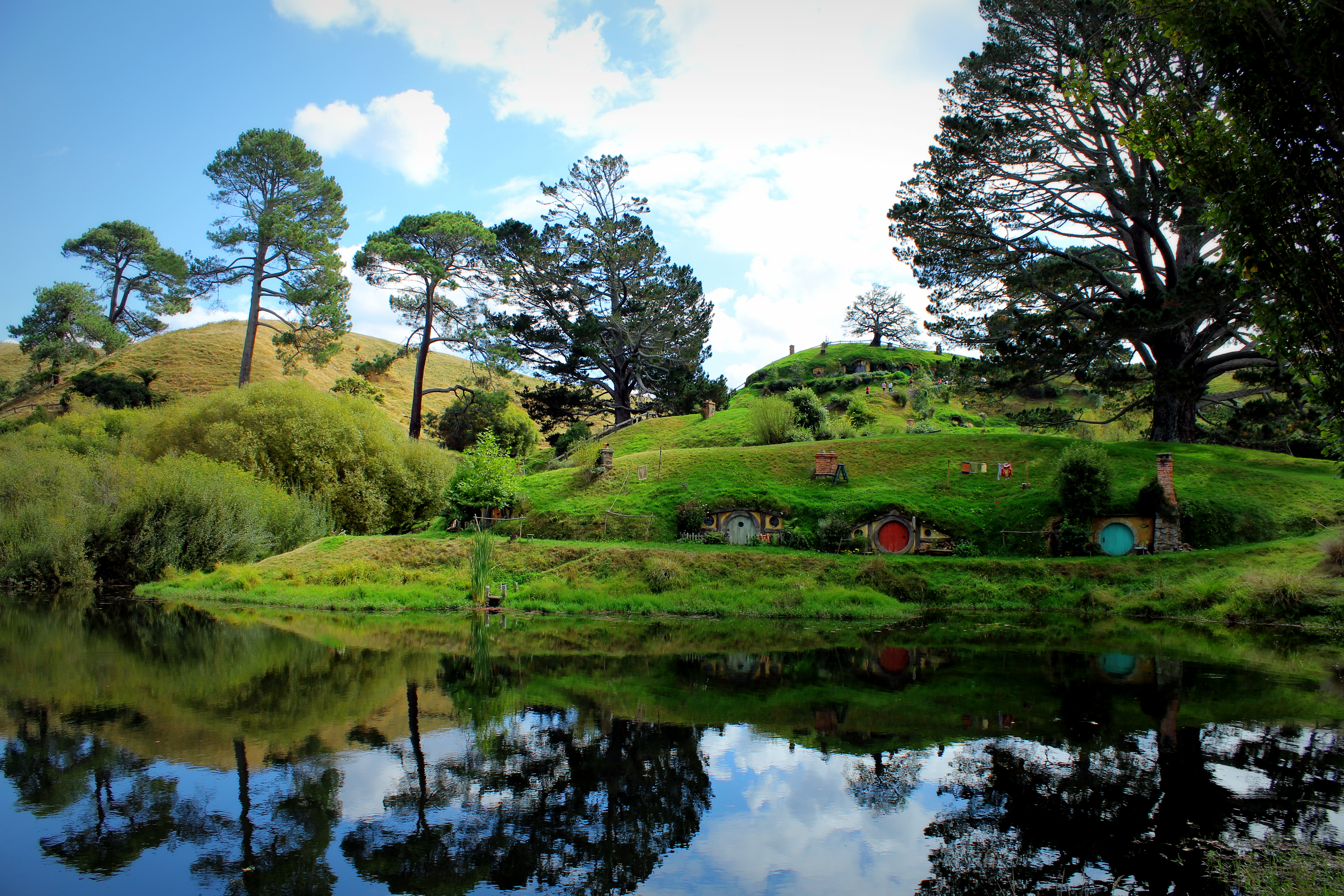
The Hobbiton Movie Set, located near Matamata, was used for The Lord of the Rings film trilogy.

Public radio was introduced in New Zealand in 1922. A state-owned television service began in 1960. Deregulation in the 1980s saw a sudden increase in the numbers of radio and television stations. New Zealand television primarily broadcasts American and British programming, along with many Australian and local shows. The number of New Zealand films significantly increased during the 1970s. In 1978 the New Zealand Film Commission started assisting local film-makers, and many films attained a world audience, some receiving international acknowledgement. The highest-grossing New Zealand films are Hunt for the Wilderpeople, Boy, The World's Fastest Indian, Whale Rider, Once Were Warriors, Tinā, Heavenly Creatures, What We Do in the Shadows and The Piano. The country's diverse scenery and compact size, plus government incentives, have encouraged some producers to shoot very big-budget and well known productions in New Zealand, including The Lord of the Rings and The Hobbit film trilogies, Avatar, The Chronicles of Narnia, King Kong, Wolverine, The Last Samurai, The Power of the Dog, Alien Covenant, Mulan, and A Minecraft Movie. The New Zealand media industry is dominated by a small number of companies, most of which are foreign-owned, although the state retains ownership of some television and radio stations. Since 1994, Freedom House has consistently ranked New Zealand's press freedom in the top twenty, with the 19th freest media as of 2015.

=== Cuisine ===
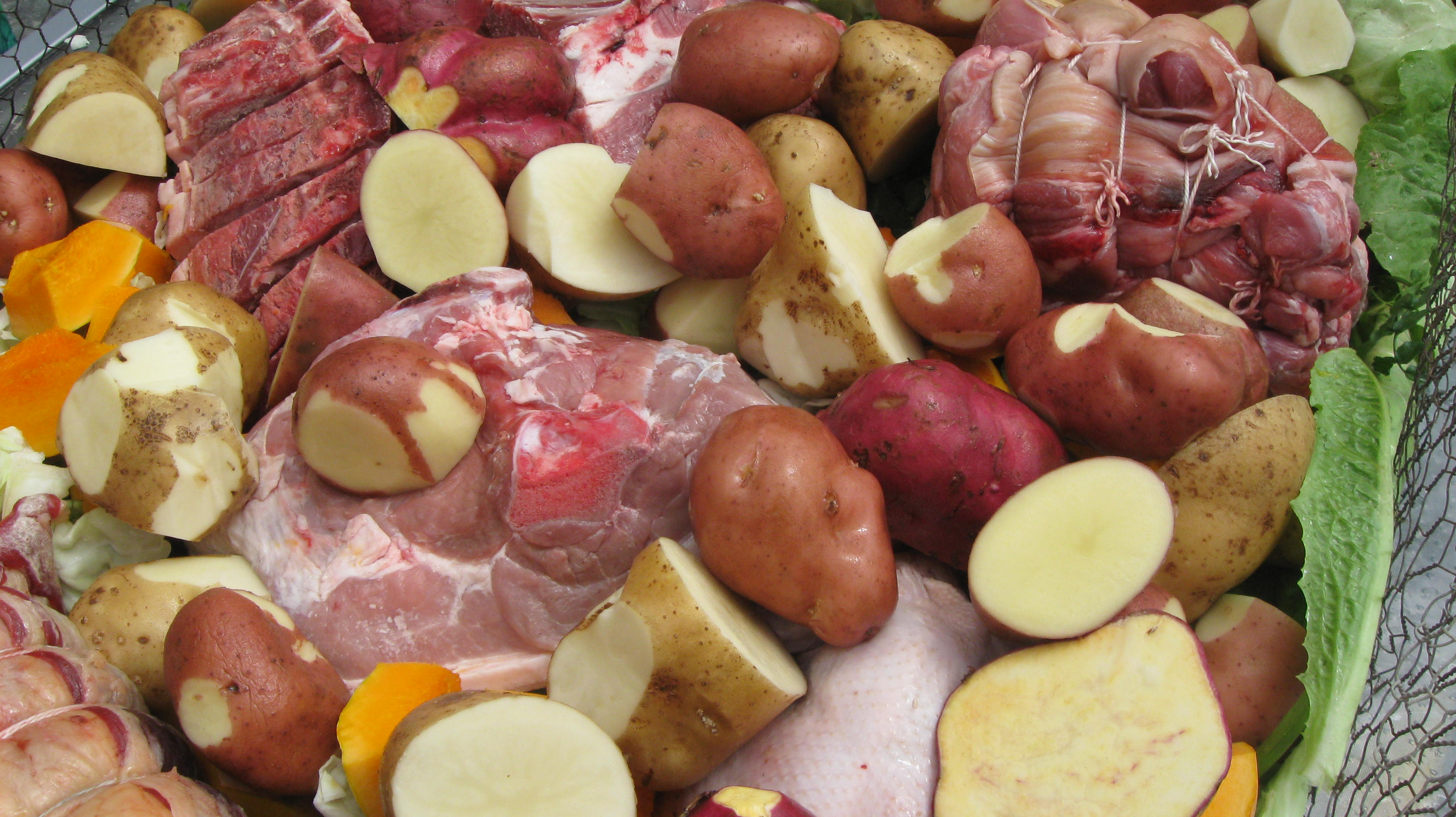
Ingredients to be prepared for a hāngī

The national cuisine has been described as "Pacific Rim, with food drawing inspiration from Europe, Asia and Polynesia". There is a wide choice offered in restaurants throughout the country. A distinctive feature of New Zealand cuisine is the casual way it is eaten, reflecting the country's laid-back lifestyle. Summertime is popular for eating out in cafes or at a barbeque, where a range of meat and seafood is readily available. A tradition Maori hangi, where food is cooked underground beside heated rocks, is popular, usually prepared for special occasions. Fish and chips is a national favorite takeaway.

New Zealand yields produce from land and sea—most crops and livestock, such as maize, potatoes and pigs, were gradually introduced by the early European settlers. Distinctive ingredients or dishes include lamb, salmon, kōura (crayfish), Bluff oysters, whitebait, pāua (abalone), mussels, scallops, pipi and tuatua (types of New Zealand shellfish), kūmara (sweet potato), kiwifruit, tamarillo, and pavlova (considered a national dessert). A hāngī is a traditional Māori method of cooking food using heated rocks buried in a pit oven that is still used for large groups on special occasions, such as tangihanga.

=== Sport ===
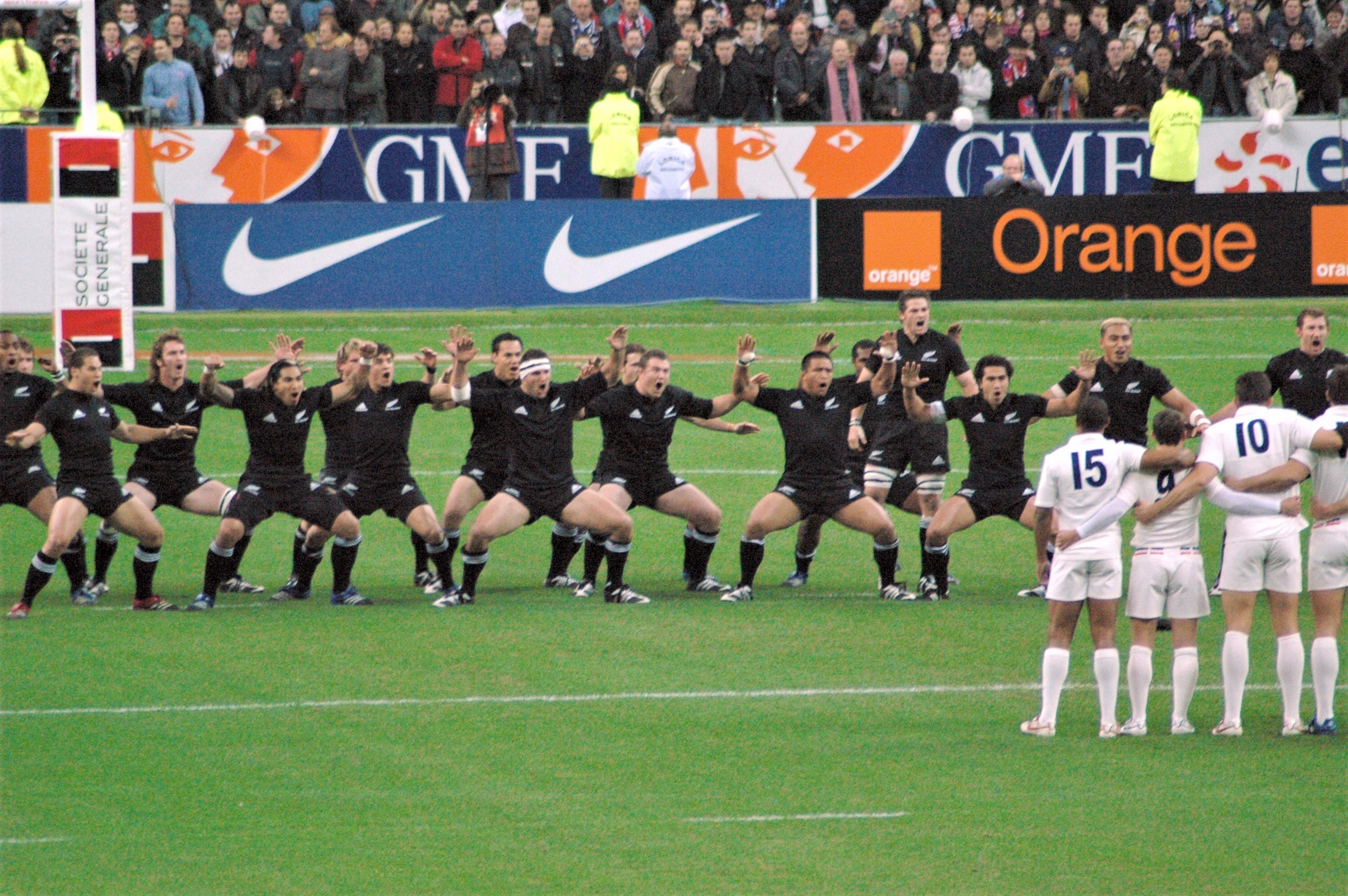
A haka performed by the New Zealand national rugby union team ("All Blacks") before a game. The haka is a challenge with vigorous movements and stamping of the feet.

Most of the major sporting codes played in New Zealand have British origins. Rugby union is considered the national sport and attracts the most spectators. Golf, netball, tennis and cricket have the highest rates of adult participation, while netball, rugby union and football (soccer) are particularly popular among young people. Horse racing is one of the most popular spectator sports in New Zealand and was part of the "rugby, racing, and beer" subculture during the 1960s. Around 54% of New Zealand adolescents participate in sports for their school. Victorious rugby tours to Australia and the United Kingdom in the late 1880s and the early 1900s played an early role in instilling a national identity. Māori participation in European sports was particularly evident in rugby, and the country's team performs a haka, a traditional Māori challenge, before international matches. New Zealand is known for its extreme sports, adventure tourism and strong mountaineering tradition, as seen in the success of notable New Zealander Sir Edmund Hillary summiting Mount Everest first. Other outdoor pursuits such as cycling, fishing, swimming, running, tramping, canoeing, hunting, snowsports, surfing and sailing are also popular. New Zealand has seen regular sailing success in the America's Cup regatta since 1995. The Polynesian sport of waka ama racing has experienced a resurgence of interest in New Zealand since the 1980s.

New Zealand has competitive international teams in rugby union, rugby league, netball, cricket, softball, and sailing. New Zealand participated at the Summer Olympics in 1908 and 1912 as a joint team with Australia, before first participating on its own in 1920. The country has ranked highly on a medals-to-population ratio at recent Games. The All Blacks, the national rugby union team, are the most successful in the history of international rugby. They have won the Men's Rugby World Cup three times.

== See also ==
- List of New Zealand-related topics
- Outline of New Zealand
