= Tourism Holdings =

Tourism Company in New Zealand

Tourism Holdings Limited
- Type: Public
- Traded as: NZX: THL
- Industry: Tourism
- Founded: 19 September 1984
- Headquarters: Auckland, New Zealand
- Key people: Grant Webster (CEO)
- Products: Vehicle rentals, tourist attractions, campervan manufacturing
- Website: www.thlonline.com

Tourism Holdings Limited (stylized as thl) is a New Zealand tourism company. The company began as a scenic helicopter sightseeing business, known as The Helicopter Line. It is now the world's largest provider of commercial RV rentals with rental operations in New Zealand, Australia, United States, Canada, United Kingdom, and Ireland. THL has been listed on the New Zealand Stock Exchange since 1986.

== History ==
In 2007, THL began to sell off a number of its business units including:

- Milford Sound Red Boats
- Kelly Tarltons Antarctic Encounter & Underwater World
- Great Sights New Zealand and Fullers Bay of Islands, initially by way of joint venture, which THL exited from
- Johnstons Coachlines, initially by way of joint venture, which THL subsequently exited from
- Its Wholesale Packaging unit

As some of these businesses were sold midway through the THL 2009 financial year, they are referred to as discontinued operations.

On 26 August 2009, THL announced it had achieved a net profit of $2.9 million in the year ended 30 June. This was a substantial decline on the previous year when a $14.3 million profit had been achieved. THL noted that discontinued operations had made a small profit however continuing operations had made a loss.

On 25 August 2014, THL announced a successful turnaround in the company's profitability and outlook with 192% increase in Net Profit After Tax of $11.1 million and gross annual dividend of 11 cents in calendar year 2014. A further 35% increase in forecast NPAT for FY15 of at least 15 million was also announced.

During the 2009 financial year, CEO Trevor Hall resigned from THL. He was replaced by Grant Webster.

In September 2012, plans began to merge THL with two other major New Zealand campervan rental companies: United Vehicle Rentals and Kea Campervans. The proposed merger was a result of falling visitor numbers from key markets in Europe such as Germany, The Netherlands and the UK, as well as the strengthened New Zealand dollar making New Zealand a more expensive destination. Combining the three businesses would lower overall operating costs and make it the most “logical, strategic and best response to the challenging realities facing the New Zealand campervan market”. On 19 October 2012 this merger was approved at a special THL shareholders meeting, effective 1 November 2012.

In December 2016, it was reported that Tourism Holdings would acquire US-based recreational vehicle hire company, El Monte Rents, for $65.3 million. The deal will be funded through debt from existing lenders and 3.4 million shares in Tourism Holdings. The acquisition provides Tourism Holdings with the second-largest market share, behind Cruise America, in the US recreational vehicle rental market with 28; whilst Cruise America holds 52%. The New Zealand Herald noted that the acquisition provided Tourism Holdings with the perfect opportunity to remodel its US operations to resemble its New Zealand and Australian Businesses.

== THL businesses ==
Rentals Group: Rental campervan operations under the following brands:

- Maui: Maui has operated in New Zealand for nearly 25 years. Expansion into Australia in the early 1990s saw the fleet increase to meet the needs of their international and domestic customer base. Maui's motorhomes range in size from two to six berths and they also rent cars and four wheel drive vehicles.
- Britz: Customers can select a two, four or six berth campervan and a rental car fleet is also available in both New Zealand and Australia.
- Mighty: In mid-2012 the Backpacker and Explore More campervan brands were combined and relaunched as Mighty, aimed to appeal directly to the lower-cost and youth market segments.
- Mighway Launched in November 2015, Mighway is a peer to peer motorhome rental platform operating in New Zealand, self-styled as the 'AirBNB' of motorhomes.
- Road Bear: In December 2010 THL purchased Road Bear, a recreational vehicle (RV) rentals business in the United States based in Los Angeles, with other depots in San Francisco, Las Vegas, Denver, New York and Orlando.
- Kea Campers Australia: In June 2012 THL announced the acquisition of the Australian operations of Kea Campers, purchased from Kea Campers New Zealand. Kea offers luxury motorhomes targeted at the high end European traveller.
- United Vehicle Rentals and KEA Campers New Zealand: In November 2012 two of New Zealand's larger motorhome companies United and KEA merged into the THL group. United operates United Campervans, a premium fleet of automatic Mercedes-Benz vehicles and Alpha Campervans, a secondary fleet. KEA Campers has a fleet of luxury vehicles aimed at the high-end, European traveller.

Action Manufacturing: Manufacturer of motor homes, campervans, caravans and other special purpose vehicles for operators such as Pacific Horizon and THL's own Rentals Group. Located in Hamilton but supplying both the New Zealand and Australian markets.

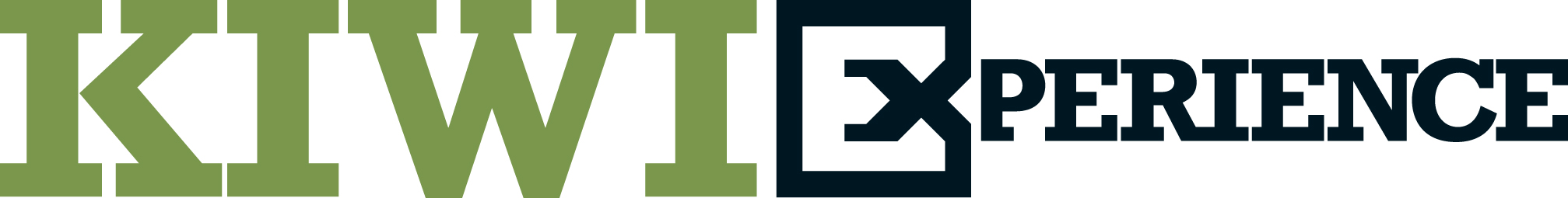

Tourism Operations: Owner and manager of the youth and backpacker orientated bus Kiwi Experience. THL also operates tours of Waitomo Glowworm Caves, Ruakuri Cave and Aranui Cave, as well as Black Water Rafting tours in New Zealand's Waitomo region.
