= List of museums in New Zealand =

This is a list of museums in New Zealand, including regional museums, local museums, art galleries and maritime museums.

| Name | Coordinates | Location | Territorial authority area/Local board area (Auckland) | Region | Type | Opened | |
|---|---|---|---|---|---|---|---|
| Adam Art Gallery | 41.2887°S 174.7659°E | Kelburn | Wellington | Wellington | Art gallery | 1947 | |
| Air Force Museum of New Zealand | 43.5463°S 172.5455°E | Wigram | Christchurch | Canterbury | Military museum | 1976 | |
| Aigantighe Art Gallery | 44.3905°S 171.2376°E | Timaru | Timaru | Canterbury | Art gallery | 1956 | |
| Albertland Heritage Museum | 36.2976°S 174.5201°E | Wellsford | Rodney | Auckland | Local museum | 1990 | |
| Aotea Utanganui - Museum of South Taranaki | 39.7545°S 174.4698°E | Patea | South Taranaki | Taranaki | Local museum | 1967 | |
| Aratoi Wairarapa Museum of Art and History | 40.9485°S 175.6628°E | Masterton | Masterton | Wellington | Art gallery | 1969 | |
| Artspace Aotearoa | 36.8578°S 174.7558°E | Auckland CBD | Waitematā | Auckland | Art gallery | 1987 | |
| Auckland Art Gallery Toi o Tāmaki | 36.8513°S 174.7640°E | Auckland CBD | Waitematā | Auckland | Art gallery | 1888 | |
| Auckland War Memorial Museum | 36.8594°S 174.7698°E | Parnell | Waitematā | Auckland | Regional museum | 1852 | |
| Bill Richardson Transport World | 46.40955°S 168.380442°E | Invercargill | Invercargill | Southland | Transport museum | 2015 | |
| Blue Oyster Art Project Space | 45.8766°S 170.5011°E | Central Dunedin | Dunedin | Otago | Art gallery | 1999 | |
| Bluff Maritime Museum | 46.5493°S 168.3014°E | Bluff | Invercargill | Southland | Maritime museum | 1992 | |
| Butler Point Whaling Museum | 34.9773°S 173.5368°E | Hihi | Far North | Northland | Specialist museum | 1970 | |
| Cadbury World (closed 2018) | 45.8741°S 170.5050°E | Dunedin Central | Dunedin | Otago | Specialist museum | 2003 | |
| Canterbury Museum | 43.5313°S 172.6261°E | Christchurch CBD | Christchurch | Canterbury | Regional museum | 1867 | |
| Carterton Railway Museum (Te Whare Rerѐwe o Carterton) | 41.0217°S 175.4534°E | Carterton | Carterton | Wellington | Railway museum | 1990 | |
| Centre of Contemporary Art | 43.5299°S 172.6299°E | Christchurch Central | Christchurch | Canterbury | Art gallery | 1880 | |
| Christchurch Art Gallery Te Puna o Waiwhetu | 43.5308°S 172.6292°E | Christchurch Central | Christchurch | Canterbury | Art gallery | 2003 | |
| City Gallery Wellington | 41.2885°S 174.7750°E | Wellington Central | Wellington | Wellington | Art gallery | 1940 | |
| Classic Flyers Museum | 37.6630°S 176.1794°E | Mount Maunganui | Tauranga | Bay of Plenty | Car museum | 2005 | |
| Classic Motorcycle Mecca | 46.4131°S 168.3492°E | Invercargill Central | Invercargill | Southland | Motorcycle museum | 2016 | |
| Clapham's National Clock Museum | | Whangārei | Whangarei District | Northland | Clock museum | | |
| Coaltown Museum | 41.7531°S 171.5779°E | Westport | Buller | West Coast | Local museum | 2013 | |
| Cobblestones Museum | 41.0851°S 175.4532°E | Greytown | South Wairarapa | Wellington | Historic village | 1970s | |
| Nairn Street Cottage | 41.0851°S 175.4532°E | Mount Cook | Wellington | Wellington | Local museum | 1980 | |
| Corban Estate Arts Centre | 36.8767°S 174.6251°E | Henderson | Henderson-Massey | Auckland | Art gallery | 2001 | |
| Crystal Mountain Mine Museum | 36.8746°S 174.5888°E | Swanson | Waitākere Ranges | Auckland | Specialist museum | 2000 | |
| Dalmatian Archives and Museum | 36.8656°S 174.7579°E | Auckland CBD | Waitematā | Auckland | Specialist museum | 1989 | |
| Denis Cohn Gallery (closed 2006) | 36.979°S 174.713°E | Māngere | Māngere-Ōtāhuhu | Auckland | Art gallery | 1979 | |
| Devonport Museum | 36.8250°S 174.8003°E | Devonport | Devonport-Takapuna | Auckland | Local museum | 1977 | |
| The Dowse Art Museum | 41.2118°S 174.9022°E | Hutt Central | Lower Hutt | Wellington | Art gallery | 1971 | |
| Dunedin Gasworks Museum | 45.8955°S 170.5091°E | Dunedin South | Dunedin | Otago | Historic gasworks | 2001 | |
| Dunedin Public Art Gallery | 45.8744°S 170.5006°E | Central Dunedin | Dunedin | Otago | Art gallery | 1884 | |
| Eastern Southland Gallery | 43.5675°S 172.7002°E | Gore | Gore | Southland | Art gallery | 1984 | |
| Edwin Fox Maritime Centre | 41.2868°S 174.0037°E | Picton | Marlborough | Marlborough | Maritime museum | 1986 | |
| Enjoy Contemporary Art Space | 41.2925°S 174.7733°E | Wellington | Wellington | Wellington | Art gallery | 2000 | |
| Faraday Museum of Technology | 39.493944°S 176.905528°E | Napier | Napier City | Hawke's Bay | Technology museum | 1993 | |
| Fell Engine Museum | 41.2925°S 174.7733°E | Featherston | South Wairarapa | Wellington | Rail museum | 1955 | |
| Ferrymead Heritage Park | 43.5675°S 172.7002°E | Ferrymead | Christchurch | Canterbury | Historic village | 1965 | |
| Flax Stripper Museum | 40.4734°S 175.2790°E | Foxton | Horowhenua | Manawatū-Whanganui | Local museum | 1990 | |
| Foxton Museum | 40.4734°S 175.2790°E | Foxton | Horowhenua | Manawatū-Whanganui | Local museum | 1990 | |
| Founders Heritage Park | 41.2619°S 173.2957°E | The Wood | Nelson | Nelson | Local museum | 1986 | |
| Gibbs Farm | 36.5198°S 174.4468°E | Makarau | Rodney | Auckland | Sculpture farm | 1991 | |
| Glenbrook Vintage Railway | 37.2079°S 174.7839°E | Waiuku | Franklin | Auckland | Heritage railway | 1977 | |
| Golden Bay Museum | 40.8577°S 172.8041°E | Tākaka | Tasman | Tasman | Local museum | 1990 | |
| Govett-Brewster Art Gallery | 39.0586°S 174.0679°E | New Plymouth Central | New Plymouth | Taranaki | Art gallery | 1970 | |
| Gus Fisher Gallery | 36.8468°S 174.7671°E | Auckland CBD | Waitematā | Auckland | Art gallery | 2001 | |
| Hastings City Art Gallery | 39.6442°S 176.8401°E | Hastings Central | Hastings | Hawke's Bay | Art gallery | 2009 | |
| Highwic | 36.8717°S 174.7730°E | Epsom | Albert-Eden | Auckland | Heritage building | 1981 | |
| Hocken Collections | 45.8699°S 170.5153°E | Dunedin Central | Dunedin | Otago | Art gallery | 1910 | |
| Howick Historical Village | 36.9074°S 174.9011°E | Pakuranga | Howick | Auckland | Heritage village | 1980 | |
| Hokitika Museum | 42.7186°N 170.9589°E | Hokitika | Westland | West Coast | Local museum | 1869 | |
| Huia Settlers Museum | 37.0049°S 174.5614°E | Huia | Waitākere Ranges | Auckland | Local museum | 1984 | |
| Hundertwasser Arts Centre and Wairau Māori Art Gallery | 35.7613°S 174.1215°E | Whangārei Central | Whangārei | Northland | Art gallery | 2022 | |
| Jonesonian Institute | 36.9846°S 174.6060°E | Huia | Waitākere Ranges | Auckland | Specialist museum | 2008 | |
| Katherine Mansfield Birthplace | 41.2701°S 174.7776°E | Thornton | Wellington | Wellington | Historic building | 1988 | |
| Kauri Museum | 36.1301°S 174.1833°E | Matakohe | Kaipara | Northland | Local museum | 1962 | |
| Larnach Castle | 45.8627°S 170.6252°E | Pukehiki | Dunedin | Otago | Historic building | 1967 | |
| Len Lye Centre | 39.0586°S 174.0679°E | New Plymouth Central | New Plymouth | Taranaki | Art gallery | 1980 | |
| Mahara Gallery | 40.8761°S 174.8837°E | Waikanae | Kāpiti Coast | Wellington | Art gallery | 1996 | |
| Mangawhai Museum | 36.1056°S 174.5801°E | Mangawhai Heads | Kaipara | Northland | Local museum | 2014 | |
| Mansion House | 36.1056°S 174.5801°E | Warkworth | Rodney | Auckland | Historic building | 1980 | |
| Museum of Transport and Technology | 36.8013°S 175.0684°E | Western Springs | Waitematā | Auckland | Technology museum | 1964 | |
| Museum of Waiheke | 36.8013°S 175.0684°E | Onetangi | Waiheke Island | Auckland | Local museum | 1990 | |
| McCahon House | 36.9473°S 174.6617°E | Titirangi | Waitākere Ranges | Auckland | Historic building | 1998 | |
| Mission House / Stone Store | 35.2180°S 173.9608°E | Kerikeri | Far North | Northland | Historic building | 1975 | |
| MTG Hawke's Bay | 39.4891°N 176.9170°E | Central Napier | Napier | Hawke's Bay | Regional museum | 1865 | |
| Napier Prison | 39.4837°S 176.9123°E | Bluff Hill | Napier | Hawke's Bay | Historic building | 2002 | |
| National Army Museum | 39.4812°S 175.6677°E | Waiouru | Ruapehu | Manawatū-Whanganui | Military museum | 1978 | |
| National Museum of Audio Visual Arts & Sciences | 40.4707°S 175.2798°E | Foxton | Horowhenua | Manawatū-Whanganui | Technology museum | 1970s | |
| National Tattoo Museum Of New Zealand | 41.2943°S 174.7708°E | Te Aro | Wellington | Wellington | Specialist museum | 2011 | |
| Nelson Provincial Museum | 41.2745°S 173.2813°E | Nelson Central | Nelson | Nelson | Regional museum | 1842 | |
| New Zealand Cricket Museum | 41.3000°S 174.7769°E | Mount Cook | Wellington | Wellington | Sports museum | 1987 | |
| New Zealand Fighter Pilots Museum (closed 2011) | 44.7238°S 169.2419°E | Wānaka | Queenstown Lakes | Otago | Military museum | 1993 | |
| New Zealand Maritime Museum | 36.8415°S 174.7611°E | Auckland CBD | Waitematā | Auckland | Maritime museum | 1993 | |
| New Zealand Olympic Museum (closed 2016) | 41.2851°S 174.7762°E | Wellington Central | Wellington | Wellington | Sports museum | 1998 | |
| New Zealand Portrait Gallery | 41.2836°S 174.7760°E | Pipitea | Wellington | Wellington | Art gallery | 1990 | |
| New Zealand Rugby Museum | 40.3581°S 175.6060°E | Palmerston North Central | Palmerston North | Manawatū-Whanganui | Sports museum | 1977 | |
| New Zealand Sports Hall of Fame | 45.8752°S 170.5068°E | Central Dunedin | Dunedin | Otago | Sports museum | 1990 | |
| New Zealand Timber Museum | 38.0690°S 175.7884°E | Lichfield | South Waikato | Waikato | Specialist museum | 1981 | |
| New Zealand Trotting Hall of Fame | 36.8926°S 174.7736°E | Epsom | Albert-Eden | Auckland | Racing museum | 1997 | |
| Ngā Taonga Sound & Vision | 41.2767°S 174.7760°E | Thorndon | Wellington | Wellington | Archive | 2019 | |
| Objectspace | 36.8580°S 174.7453°E | Grey Lynn | Waitematā | Auckland | Art gallery | 2004 | |
| Olveston | 45.8663°S 170.5004°E | Dunedin North | Dunedin | Otago | Heritage building | 1967 | |
| Omaka Aviation Heritage Centre | 41.5377°S 173.9275°E | Blenheim | Marlborough | Marlborough | Aviation museum | 1996 | |
| Opotiki Heritage and Agricultural Society | 38.0044°S 177.2830°E | Ōpōtiki | Ōpōtiki | Bay of Plenty | Local museum | 2001 | |
| Oratia Folk Museum | 36.9099°S 174.6209°E | Oratia | Waitākere Ranges | Auckland | Local museum | 1992 | |
| Otago Museum | 45.8659°S 170.5086°E | Dunedin Central | Dunedin | Otago | Regional museum | 1865 | |
| Otaki Museum | 40.7527°S 175.1368°E | Ōtaki | Kāpiti Coast | Wellington | Local museum | 2003 | |
| Polish Heritage Trust Museum | 36.9017°S 174.9250°E | Howick | Howick | Auckland | Specialist museum | 2004 | |
| Pahiatua & Districts Museum | 40.4530°S 175.8411°E | Pahiatua | Tararua | Manawatū-Whanganui | Local museum | 1977 | |
| Pahiatua Railcar Society | 40.4453°S 175.8117°E | Pahiatua | Tararua | Manawatū-Whanganui | Local museum | 1991 | |
| Papakura Museum | 37.0638°S 174.9405°E | Papakura | Howick | Auckland | Local museum | 1972 | |
| Pataka Art + Museum | 41.1317°S 174.8375°E | Porirua Central | Porirua | Wellington | Art gallery, local museum | 1998 | |
| Papatoetoe Historical Society | 36.9824°S 174.8451°E | Papatoetoe | Ōtara-Papatoetoe | Auckland | Local museum | 1988 | |
| The Physics Room | 43.5313°S 172.6281°E | Christchurch Central | Christchurch | Canterbury | Art gallery | 1992 | |
| The Plains Vintage Railway & Historical Museum | 43.9239°S 171.7062°E | Tinwald | Ashburton | Canterbury | Heritage railway | 1973 | |
| Pleasant Point Museum and Railway | 44.2610°S 171.1290°E | Pleasant Point | Timaru | Canterbury | Railway museum | 1970 | |
| Pompallier House | 35.2644°S 174.1198°E | Russell | Far North | Northland | Heritage building | 1941 | |
| Port Chalmers Maritime Museum | 45.8561°S 170.5054°E | Port Chalmers | Dunedin | Otago | Maritime museum | 1913 | |
| Puke Ariki | 39.0571°S 174.0699°E | New Plymouth Central | New Plymouth | Taranaki | Regional museum | 2003 | |
| Ravenscar House Museum | 39.0571°S 174.0699°E | Christchurch CBD | Christchurch | Canterbury | Art gallery | 2021 | |
| Rotoroa Island Museum | 36.8162°S 175.1958°E | Rotoroa Island | Waiheke Island | Auckland | Local museum | 2009 | |
| Rotorua Museum | 38.1356°S 176.2569°E | Rotorua Central | Rotorua Lakes | Bay of Plenty | Local museum | 1969 | |
| Reserve Bank Museum | 41.2825°S 174.7713°E | Wellington Central | Wellington | Wellington | Specialist museum | 2006 | |
| Reyburn House Art Gallery | 35.7258°S 174.3249°E | Whangārei Central | Whangarei District | Northland | Art gallery | 1966 | |
| Sarjeant Gallery | 39.9342°S 175.0534°E | Whanganui Central | Whanganui | Manawatū-Whanganui | Art gallery | 1919 | |
| St Paul St Gallery | 36.8538°S 174.7641°E | Auckland CBD | Waitematā | Auckland | Art gallery | 2004 | |
| Shantytown | 42.5338°S 171.1802°E | Paroa | Grey | West Coast | Heritage village | 1971 | |
| Steampunk HQ | 45.1022°S 170.9682°E | Oamaru | Waitaki | Otago | Art gallery | 2011 | |
| Southland Museum and Art Gallery | 46.4053°S 168.3515°E | Invercargill Central | Invercargill | Southland | Regional museum | 1869 | |
| South Canterbury Museum | 44.3971°S 171.2490°E | Timaru | Timaru | Canterbury | Local museum | 1952 | |
| Southward Car Museum | 40.8939°S 175.0267°E | Otaihanga | Kāpiti Coast | Wellington | Car museum | 1979 | |
| Space Place at Carter Observatory | 41.2843°S 174.7648°E | Kelburn | Wellington | Wellington | Observatory | 1941 | |
| The Suter Art Gallery | 41.2722°S 173.2820°E | Nelson Central | Nelson | Nelson | Art gallery | 1899 | |
| Tairawhiti Museum | 38.6637°S 178.0265°E | Whataupoko | Gisborne | Gisborne | Local museum | 1883 | |
| Taupō Museum | 38.6873°S 176.0653°E | Taupō Central | Taupō | Waikato | Local museum | 1970s | |
| Tauranga Art Gallery | 37.6832°S 176.1669°E | Tauranga Central | Tauranga | Bay of Plenty | Art gallery | 2007 | |
| Te Awahou Nieuwe Stroom | 40.4737°S 175.2786°E | Foxton | Horowhenua | Manawatū-Whanganui | Local museum | 2017 | |
| Te Hikoi Museum | -46.351755146981894, 168.0132343304666 | Riverton / Aparima | Southland District | Southland | Local Museum | 2009 | |
| Te Kōngahu Museum of Waitangi | 35.2669°S 174.0790°E | Waitangi | Far North | Northland | National museum | 2016 | |
| Te Manawa | 40.2920°S 175.5197°E | Palmerston North Central | Palmerston North | Manawatū-Whanganui | Regional museum | 1999 | |
| Te Papa | 41.2904°S 174.7799°E | Wellington Central | Wellington | Wellington | National museum | 1998 | |
| Te Puia | 38.1641°S 176.2482°E | Whakarewarewa | Rotorua Lakes | Bay of Plenty | Specialist museum | 1963 | |
| Te Rau Aroha Museum | 35.2663°S 174.0797°E | Waitangi | Far North | Northland | National museum | 2020 | |
| Te Tuhi | 35.2663°S 174.0797°E | Pakuranga | Howick | Auckland | Art gallery | 1975 | |
| Te Uru Waitākere Contemporary Gallery | 36.9383°S 174.6530°E | Titirangi | Waitākere Ranges | Auckland | Art gallery | 1986 | |
| Te Waimate Mission | 35.3165°S 173.8736°E | Waimate North | Far North | Northland | Historic building | 1961 | |
| Te Wairoa | 38.2119°S 176.3613°E | Lake Tarawera | Rotorua | Bay of Plenty | Historic village | 1931 | Thames School of Mines and Minerals Museum Thames |
| Toitū Otago Settlers Museum | 45.8766°S 170.5041°E | Dunedin Central | Dunedin | Otago | Regional museum | 1898 | |
| Torpedo Bay Navy Museum | 36.8288°S 174.8068°E | Devonport | Devonport-Takapuna | Auckland | Maritime museum, military museum | 2010 | |
| Treaty House | 35.2658°S 174.0794°E | Waitangi | Far North | Northland | National museum | 1933 | |
| Uxbridge Art Gallery | 36.8941°S 174.9317°E | Mellons Bay | Howick | Auckland | Art gallery | 1981 | |
| Waikato Museum Te Whare Taonga o Waikato | 37.7899°S 175.2841°E | Hamilton Central | Hamilton | Waikato | Regional museum | 1965 | |
| Waimarino Museum | 39.4257°S 175.2736°E | Raetihi | Ruapehu | Manawatū-Whanganui | Local museum | 1981 | |
| Waitangi Treaty Grounds | 39.4257°S 175.2737°E | Waitangi | Far North | Northland | Historic site | 1934 | |
| Waitomo Caves Museum | 39.4257°S 175.2737°E | Waitomo | Waitomo | Waikato | Local museum | 1973 | |
| Waiuku Museum | 39.4257°S 175.2737°E | Waiuku | Franklin | Auckland | Local museum | 1965 | |
| Warkworth Museum | 39.4257°S 175.2737°E | Warkworth | Rodney | Auckland | Local museum | 1979 | |
| Wellington Museum | 39.4257°S 175.2737°E | Wellington Central | Wellington | Wellington | Regional museum | 1999 | |
| Wellington Tramway Museum | 40.9691°S 174.9781°E | Paraparaumu | Kāpiti Coast | Wellington | Rail museum | 1965 | |
| Whakatāne Museum | 37.9537°S 176.9926°E | Whakatāne | Whakatāne | Bay of Plenty | Local museum | 1972 | |
| Whakamana Cannabis Museum | 36.8566°S 174.7582°E | Auckland Central | Waitematā | Auckland | Cannabis museum | 2024 | |
| Whanganui Regional Museum | 39.9316°S 175.0497°E | Whanganui Central | Whanganui | Manawatū-Whanganui | Regional museum | 1892 | |
| Whangārei Art Museum Te Manawa Toi | 35.7251°S 174.3235°E | Whangārei Central | Whangārei | Northland | Art gallery | 1996 | |
| Whangarei Museum | 35.7423°S 174.2678°E | Maunu | Whangārei | Northland | Local museum | 1890 | |
| Whittaker's Music Museum | 36.7809°S 175.0047°E | Oneroa | Waiheke Island | Auckland | Specialist museum | 1996 | |
| Yaldhurst Museum | 43.5111°S 172.5025°E | Yaldhurst | Christchurch | Canterbury | Local museum | 1968 | |

== See also ==
- New Zealand Fashion Museum
- List of New Zealand railway museums and heritage lines
- Tourism in New Zealand
- Culture of New Zealand
