= Caving in New Zealand =

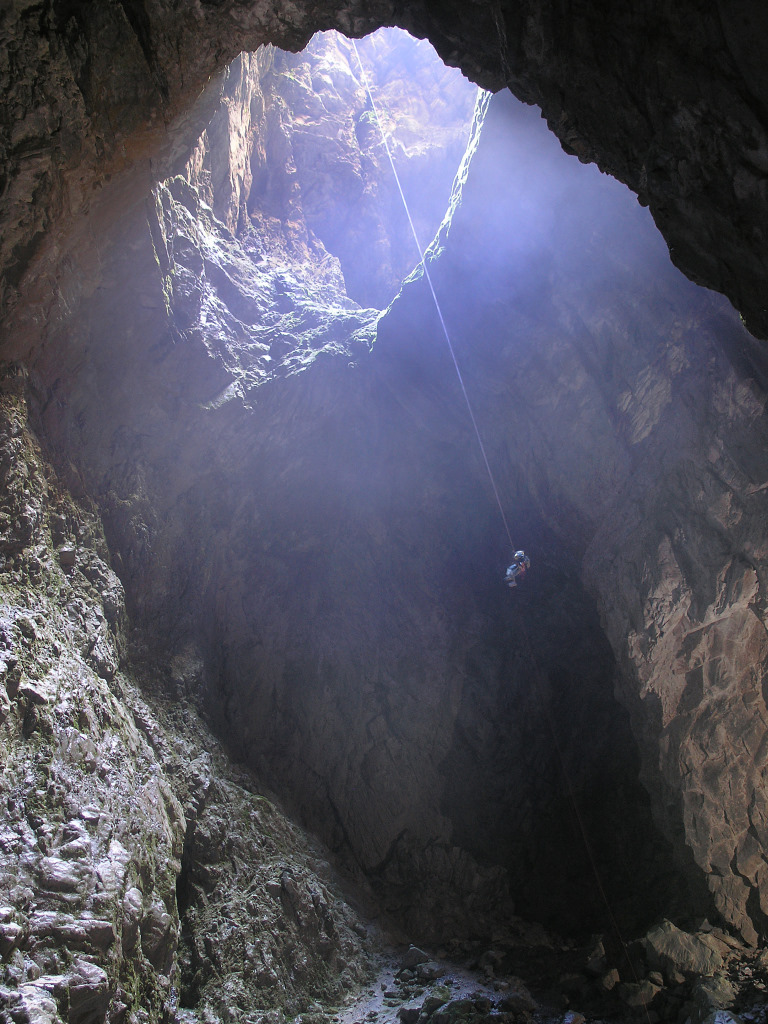
A caver descending Harwoods Hole

Caving in New Zealand is an established hobby as well as being a part of commercial tourism.

Recreational caving is practised by several hundred members of caving associations all over New Zealand, who take advantage of the widespread limestone karst cave systems present in the country, especially in the Waitomo District of the North Island and in the Nelson-Tasman region of the South Island. There are also several hundred thousands of visitors to various tourist caves in New Zealand per year, though a majority of these trips would not properly be called caving.

== History ==
=== Overview ===
New Zealand caving as an exploratory sport is thought to have started with a group of Auckland-area people who started to explore the lava caves in the volcanic cones of the area in the 1940s (though commercialised trips through caves at Waitomo Caves had actually already existed for several decades). The group quickly progressed to exploring caves in the Waikato and King Country areas, and the New Zealand Speleological Society was founded in 1949 by Henry Lambert, with the first rough facilities at Waitomo being established in 1955.

Harwood’s Hole was discovered in the South Island in 1957. It has a 183-metre vertical entrance shaft and passages extending hundreds of metres underground, and was regarded for many years as New Zealand’s deepest non-commercial cave. The Nelson area also contains several deep caves, including Bulmer Cavern, which has approximately 70 kilometres of passages.[2]

New Zealand's cavers are mostly organised in the New Zealand Speleological Society (NZSS), with 6 affiliated caving clubs with a total of 400 members all over the country. The affiliated clubs are: Auckland Speleological Group (ASG), Hamilton Tomo Group (HTG), Manawatu Speleological Group (MSG), Wellington Caving Group (WCG), Nelson Speleological Group (NSG) and Canterbury Caving Group (CCG)

There are thousands of caves in New Zealand and their make up is generally limestone, marble, lava and sandstone. Location of caves are generally not disclosed as this assists in the conservation of the caves and artifacts held within them. To join the society only requires an email to membership officer.

=== Accidents and rescues ===
There have been a number of notable caving accidents since the 1940s, and at least four deaths as of 2007. On 4 January 1960, Peter Lambert was killed by falling rocks while being winched out of Harwoods Hole, and in 1995, Dave Weaver drowned while cave diving in Pearse Resurgence near Nelson.

In 1998, one of the most active cavers of the country, Kieran McKay, broke his jaw in Bulmer Cavern on Mt Owen. While the cavern has few squeezes and crawls, the operation to retrieve him from deep within the cave occupied around 80 cavers (in direct position or as support) from all over the country for several days.

In 2007, Michael Brewer, another experienced caver, was struck by falling rock deep within the Greenlink-Middle Earth cave, in an incident which attracted widespread media attention in the country. Brewer suffered cracked ribs, concussion, and a broken pelvis. It took about 3 days to get him to the surface (a 3 km distance normally taking 5 hours), and while most of the distance was covered with Brewer on a stretcher, and several tight squeezes were widened with explosives, he had to be pushed and pulled through some sections. The effort involved more than 50 cavers and cost around NZ$100,000.

In 2008, Jane Furket, a 28-year-old experienced recreational caver and member of the Nelson Caving Club, fell in the Luckie Strike cave west of Waitomo. She broke her hip and lost three teeth.

New Zealand cave rescues are undertaken by SAR teams composed of experienced cavers who have also undergone specialised training courses and exercises.

== Caves ==
As well as lava caves in the Auckland volcanic field there are numerous limestone caves in the North Island, with the most well known being the Waitomo Caves. The longest and deepest caves are in the Kahurangi National Park in the South Island

== Commercial caving operations ==
New Zealand offers a number of adventure tourism activities and one of them is caving. Most of the commercial caving is done in the Waitomo area, but there are also tours offered in Fiordland and on the West Coast. Black water rafting, where the participants float through caves on tyre inner tubes, was an early tourism venture and has become extremely popular.

== See also ==
- Tourism in New Zealand
