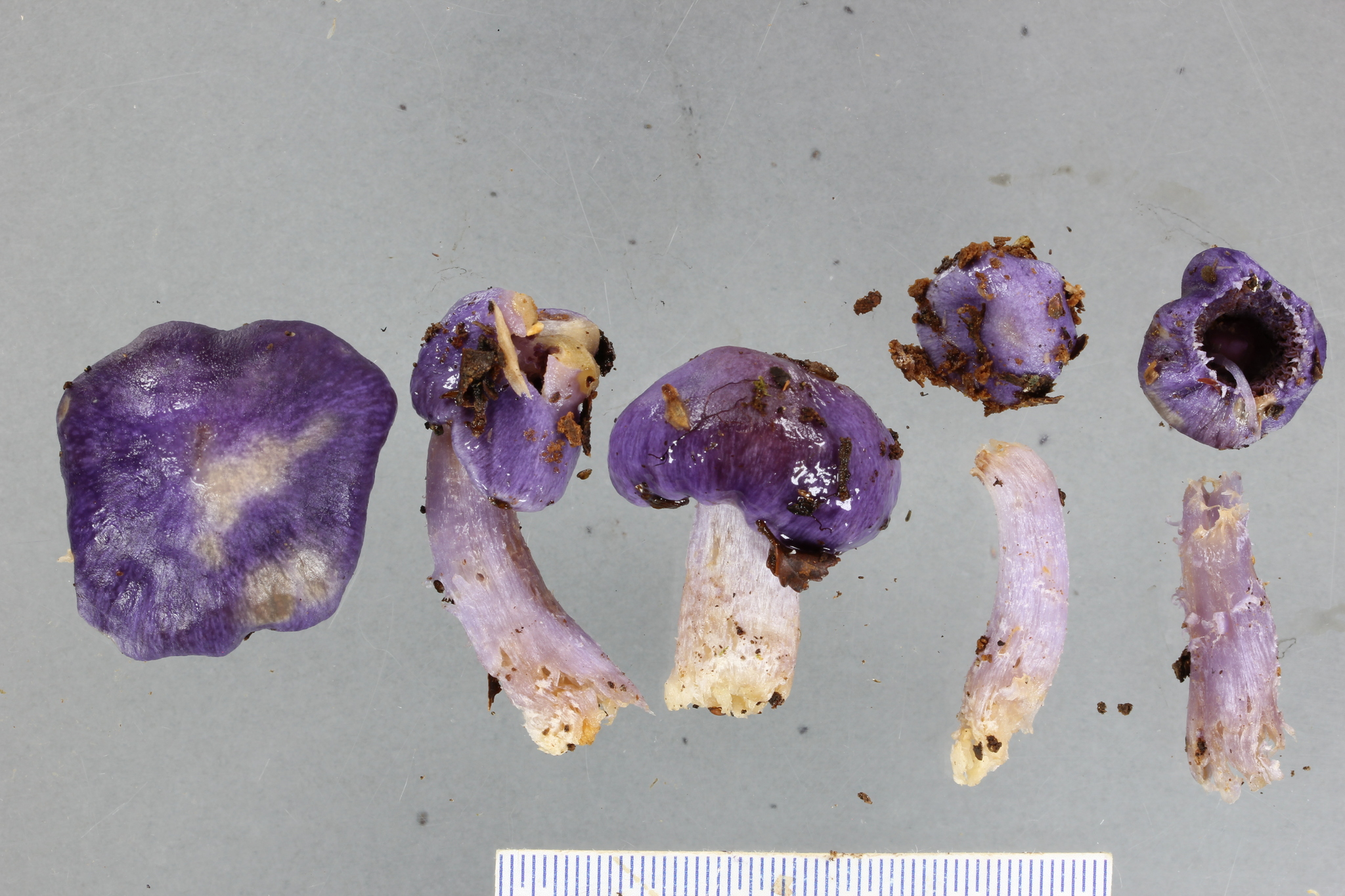
- Holotype of Cortinarius violaceocystidiatus OTA70379

Scientific classification
- Kingdom: Fungi
- Division: Basidiomycota
- Class: Agaricomycetes
- Order: Agaricales
- Family: Cortinariaceae
- Genus: Cortinarius
- Species: C. violaceocystidiatus

Binomial name
- Cortinarius violaceocystidiatus A.R. Nilsen & Orlovich

= Cortinarius violaceocystidiatus =

Species of purple pouch fungus

Cortinarius violaceocystidiatus is a species of purple pouch fungus in the genus Cortinarius. It is endemic to Aotearoa New Zealand.

== Taxonomy ==
Cortinarius violaceocystidiatus was described by Andy Nilsen and David Orlovich in 2020. The holotype was collected by Andy Nilsen in 2017 near Harwoods Hole in the Abel Tasman National Park, in the north-west of the South Island, New Zealand. Cortinarius violaceocystidiatus is in Section Cuphomorphi along with C. cuphomorphus and C. juglandaceus.

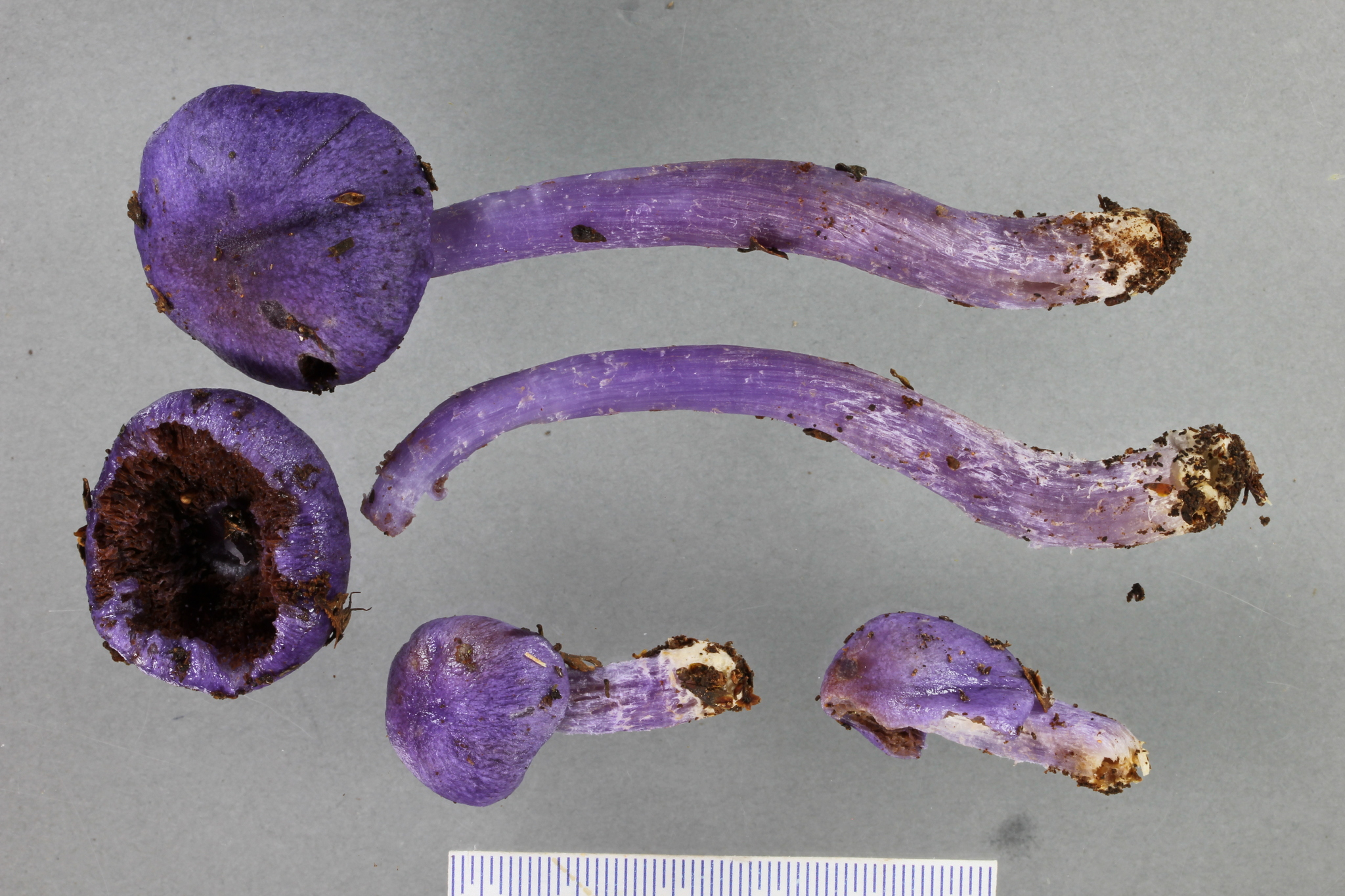
Cortinarius violaceocystidiatus OTA64063 from the Heaphy Track in the north-west of the South Island of New Zealand

== Description ==
This species produces secotioid fruit bodies. The pileus ranges from 20 to 35 mm in diameter. It is broadly rounded with an incurved margin that is not attached to stipe at maturity. The pileus margin is entire to cracked, occasionally appendiculate, tending to be slimy, dark violet to almost black, not hygrophanous, with pale violet mottling. The hymenophore locules are up to 3 mm long, ellipsoid in shape and coloured brown, attached to the upper section of the stipe then becoming free. The columella is percurrent. The stipe ranges from 25 to 80 mm long and 7 to 12 mm wide, centrally attached, equal to tapering, white to pale violet in colour with longitudinal striations, occasionally with tufts toward the base. The stipe has a fragile attachment to the pileus. The stipe context is white with a violaceus sheen to violet. Neither the cuticle of the pileus nor the stipe exhibit a colour change upon application of potassium hydroxide.

Cortinarius violaceocystidiatus is unique in Section Cuphomorphi in being secotioid, whereas the other two species C. cuphomorphus and C. juglandaceus are both agaricoid.

Cortinarius violaceocystidiatus is distinguished from the other purple secotioid fungi of New Zealand in having a dark violet to almost black pileus with pale violet mottling, presence of infrequent violet cystidia, and narrower basidiospores (12–15 × 5–7 μm).

== Habitat and distribution ==
Cortinarius violaceocystidiatus is known only from the Tasman region in the South Island of New Zealand. It is an ectomycorrhizal fungus, associated with Nothofagus species including silver beech (Nothofagus menziesii) and red beech (Nothofagus fusca).

== Etymology ==
The specific epithet violaceocystidiatus derives from the Latin violaceo meaning violet and cystidiatus meaning cystidia. This refers to the infrequent purple cystidia.

== See also ==
- List of Cortinarius species
