= Waitomo Glowworm Cave =

Cave in New Zealand

Coordinates: 38.2608°S 175.1036°E

- Waitomo Cave
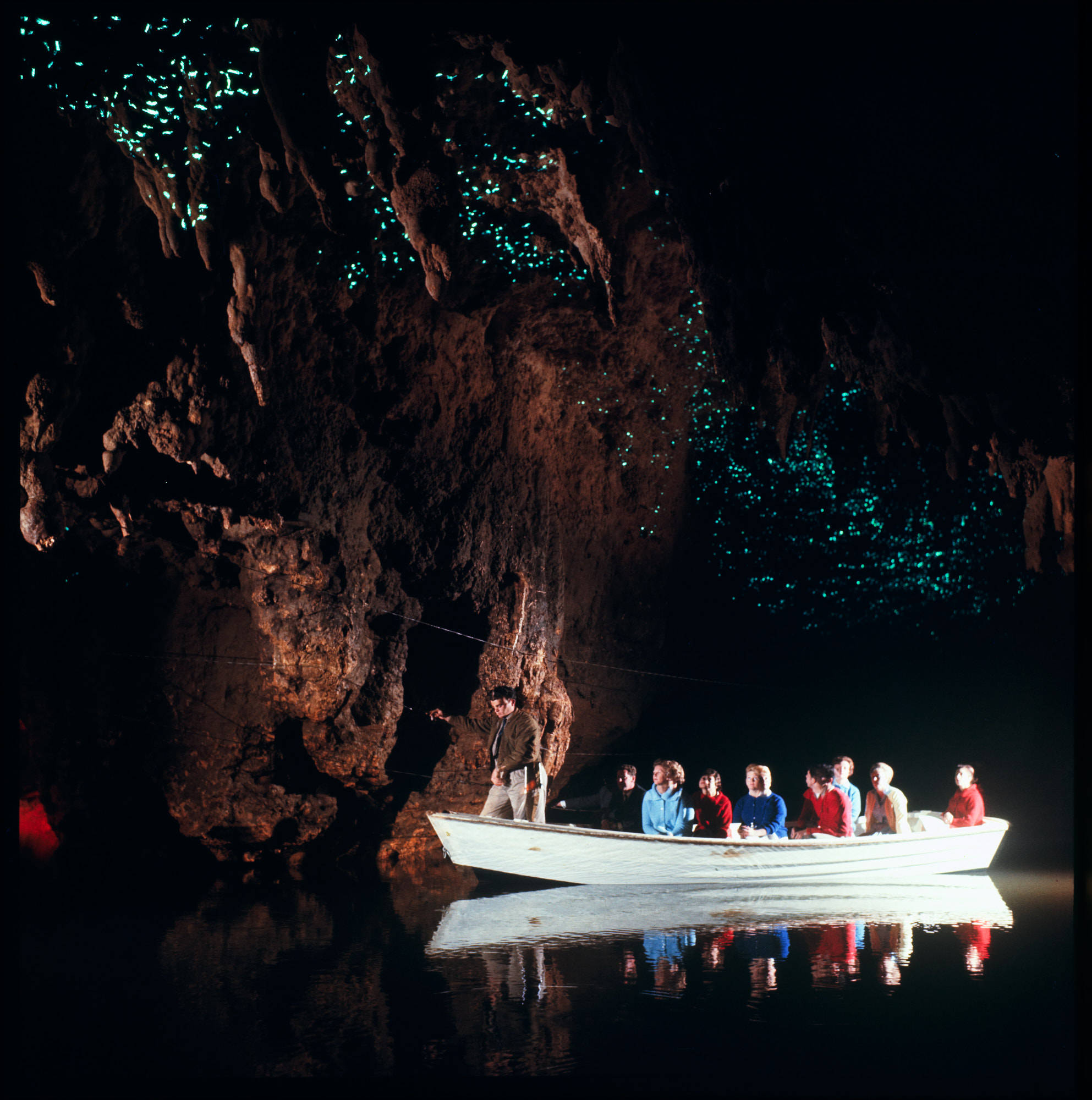
- Tourists gliding through the Glowworm Grotto on a boat, circa 1970.
- Interactive map of Waitomo Glowworm Cave
- Location: Waitomo, New Zealand
- Discovery: 1887, by Tane Tinorau and Fred Mace
- Geology: Limestone
- Entrances: 2
- Access: public, via paid guided tours
- Show cave opened: 1889
- Visitors: 500,000 annually
- Website: https://www.waitomo.com/glowworms-and-caves/waitomo-glowworm-caves

The Waitomo Glowworm Cave (officially, Waitomo Cave) is a cave with several large chambers at Waitomo in the North Island of New Zealand. The cave is a tourist attraction known for its population of Arachnocampa luminosa, a glowworm species found only in New Zealand. In 2013 it was stated that the Waitomo Glowworm Cave was "the most visited glowworm display in the world". The attraction has a modern visitor centre at the entrance, largely designed in wood. There are organized tours that include a boat ride under the glowworms.

This cave is part of the Waitomo streamway system that includes the Ruakuri Cave, Lucky Strike, and Tumutumu Cave.

== History ==
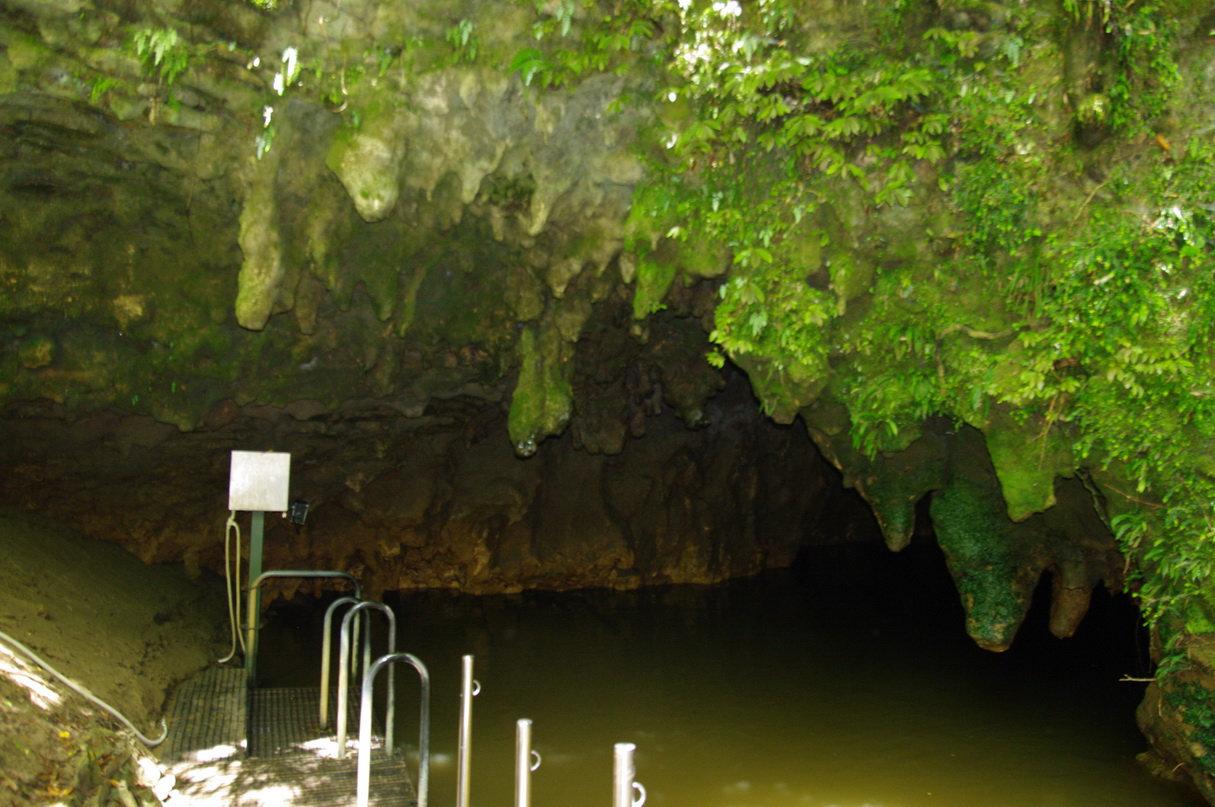
The Waitomo Stream and mouth of the cave, where Tinorau and Mace entered in 1887. Now used as the exit.

The name "Waitomo" comes from the Māori words wai, water and tomo, hole or shaft. In 1884, a local Māori, Tane Tinorau, showed surveyors Laurence Cussen and Fred Mace the entrance where the Waitomo Stream enters the cave. Māori had known about the cave for about a century, but there is no evidence that they had ventured inside it. In December 1887 Tinorau and Mace built a raft and entered the cave where the Waitomo Stream goes underground (now the cave's tourist exit), exploring by candlelight. As they began their journey, they came across the Glowworm Grotto and were amazed by the twinkling glow coming from the ceiling. As they travelled further into the cave by poling themselves towards an embankment, they were also astounded by the limestone formations. These formations surrounded them in all shapes and sizes. Tinorau and Mace, accompanied by others, explored further in February 1888. Tinorau independently discovered the upper level entrance to the cave, which is now the visitor entrance.

Visitor access improved when the railway was extended to Ōtorohanga in 1887, and a road from the station at Hangatiki was built early in 1890. By 1889 Tinorau and his wife Huti had opened the cave to visitors and were leading groups for a fee. Visitors were taken inside the cave by canoe and landed on the shore inside, then accessed areas of the cave via ladders 25 ft long. After touring the cave the visitors were led out at the top opening, "50 ft above the water". Thomas Humphries (Commissioner of Crown Lands and Chief Surveyor of Auckland 1889 – 1891) did a full study in 1889, noting that graffiti had already been inscribed on the "most delicate portions" of the cave. He noted that "the natives are now taking great care of the caves", but recommended that government take over the cave to provide more visitor facilities. In 1891, the government-appointed caretaker stated that more than 500 tourists had visited the cave during the first 18 months. There was an escalation in vandalism in the following years, so after years of attempts to buy the cave, the government used the Scenery Preservation Act 1903 and the Public Works Act 1905 to take it over for £625 in 1905.

Electric lighting was installed in the cave in 1926. Prior to this, visitors had used candles, hurricane lamps, acetylene torches or magnesium flares to light their way.

In 1909 the government built the Waitomo Caves Hotel to house increasing numbers of visitors. Tourist Hotel Corporation, a state-owned business, took over in 1957. The hotel was sold to Southern Pacific Hotels Corporation in 1990 and, in 1994, they agreed a licence for the cave with DOC and the Māori owners, selling it to Tourism Holdings Limited in 1996.

In 1989, the land and cave were returned to the original owners of the land, including descendants of Tane Tinorau and Huti who comprise many of the employees of the caves today. The descendants receive a percentage of the cave's revenue and are involved in its management and development under the 1990 Waitomo Deed of Settlement.

== Geology and features of the cave ==
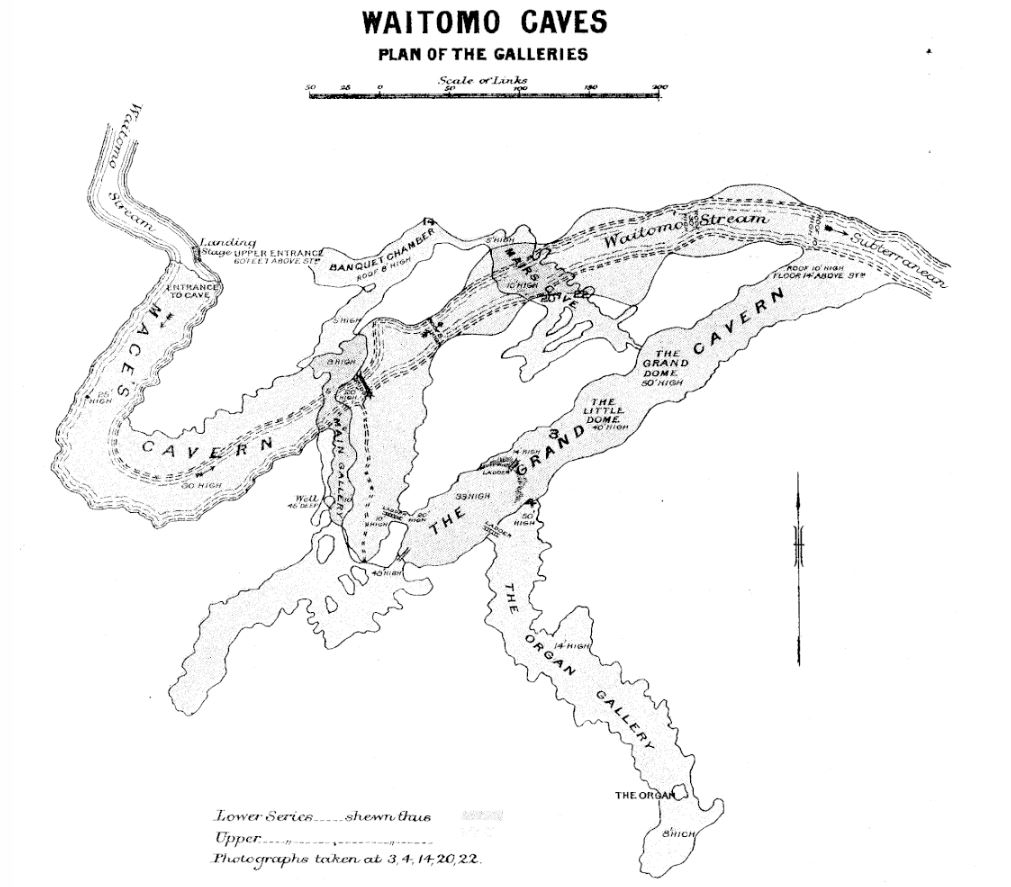
1889 map of the cave by Thomas Humphries, showing various features including the Cathedral (labelled as Grand Cavern), the Glowworm Grotto (labelled Mace's Cavern after Fred Mace), and the Tomo (labelled as the Well).

Geological and volcanic activity has created around 300 known limestone caves in the Waitomo region over the last 30 million years. The Waitomo Glowworm Cave is situated in a ridge of Oligocene limestone formed when the region was still under the ocean about 30 million years ago. The limestone is composed of fossilized corals, seashells, fish skeletons, and many small marine organisms on the sea beds. Over millions of years, these fossilized rocks have been layered upon each other and compressed to create limestone and within the Waitomo region the limestone can be over 200 m (660 ft) thick. Quaternary volcanic ash covers the limestone in the region, producing fine-grained sediment in local streams. It was estimated in 1974 that during the previous 90 years about 4 m (13 ft) of silty sediment had been deposited in the Glowworm Cave, narrowing the stream channel. After heavy rain the stream level inside the cave rises, and has occasionally flooded the lower levels of the cave.

The Waitomo Glowworm Cave began to form when earth movement caused the hard limestone to bend and buckle under the ocean and rise above the sea floor. As the rock was exposed to air, it separated and created cracks and weaknesses that allowed water to flow through them dissolving the limestone, and over millions of years large chambers within the cave were formed. Stalactites, stalagmites, and other cave formations grew from water dripping from the ceiling or flowing over the walls and leaving behind limestone deposits. Many features and the large chambers have been named.

The Waitomo Glowworm Cave consists of 1,300 m (4,300 ft) of interconnected passages and several large chambers on two levels. The top level of the cave is drier than the lower level where the Waitomo Stream passes through the cave in a series of lakes. It is probable that the large chambers on the upper level were once the route of the river.

There are two entrances which are 14 m (46 ft) apart vertically. Two passages lead from the top entrance: a 40 m-long (130 ft) passage leading to the Blanket Chamber, and the 39 m-long (128 ft) main passage which leads past a 16 m (52 ft) vertical shaft through the limestone, known as the Tomo. The Tomo links the two levels of the cave and allows air to flow between them. The Blanket is a notable stalactite formation, so thin it is translucent, that looks like a blanket hanging from a rail.

The Blanket Chamber leads into the Cathedral, the largest chamber in the cave. The Cathedral is 40 m-long (130 ft) and 13 m (43 ft) high. It has good acoustics, and a number of famous singers and choirs have performed here. When Malvina Major performed in front of about 150 people in the Cathedral in 1998, scientists monitored the chamber to measure the carbon dioxide, heat and humidity produced by the audience.

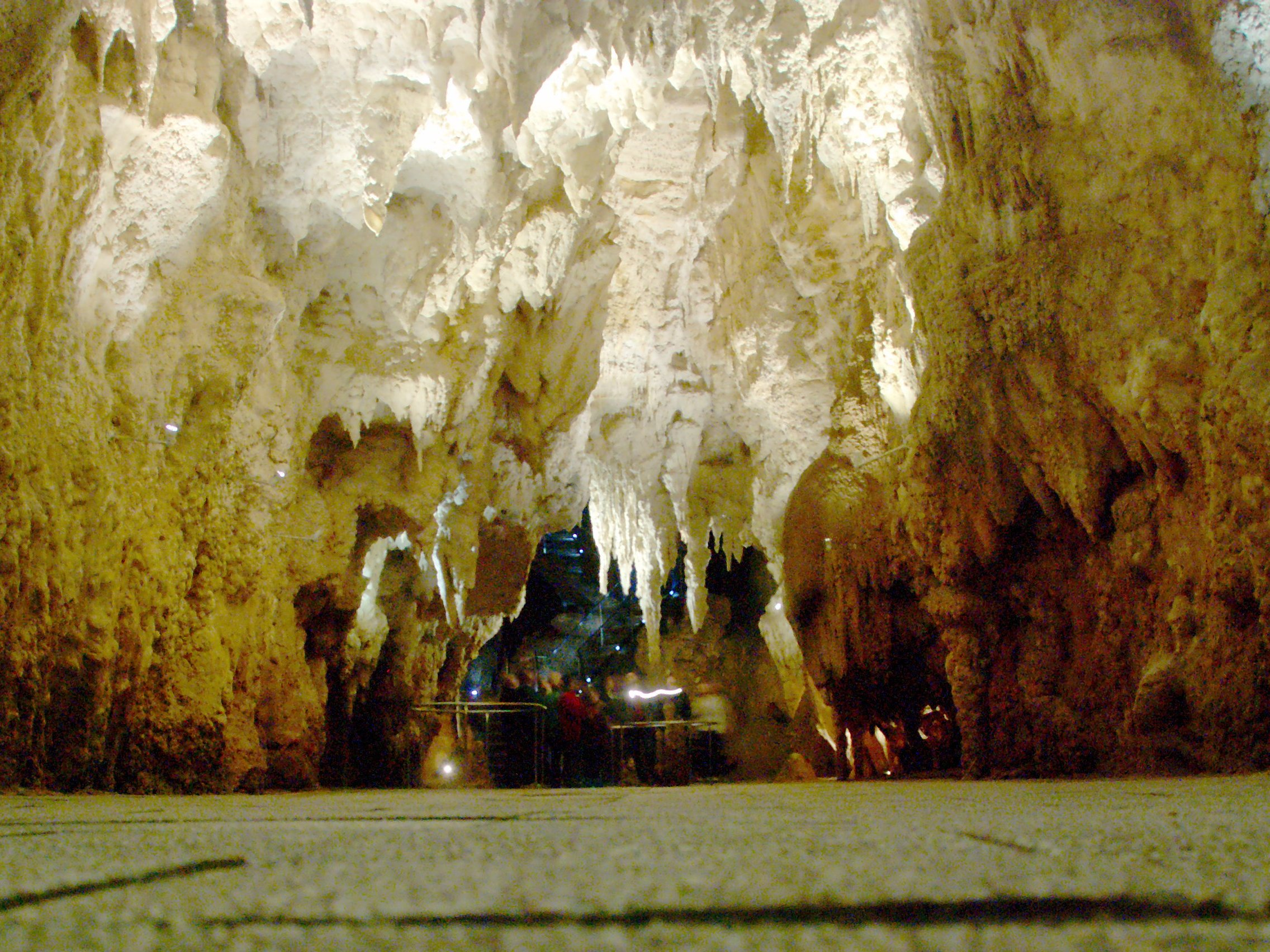
The Cathedral in the Waitomo Glowworm Caves

From the Cathedral a side passage leads to the Organ Loft, where there is a mass of stalagmites that has a form reminiscent of a pipe organ. On busy days this area is closed to the public because the build-up of carbon dioxide may be hazardous. Other chambers include the Catacombs and the Banquet Chamber, named by Humphries in 1889 after the Māori owners of the cave set up a table and seats and provided dinner for the government party. Smoke from their candles has discoloured the ceiling.

On the lower, more humid level is the Waikato Stream, Glowworm Grotto, Demonstration Platform, and the jetty. At the jetty, visitors board a small boat and then float along the Waitomo Stream through the Glowworm Grotto, the lowest part of the cave. This is a cavern about 30 m-long (98 ft) and 10 m (33 ft) wide with a ceiling covered in glowworms.

== Flora and fauna ==
The most common animals in the cave are insects, including the renowned glowworm Arachnocampa luminosa, a species of fungus gnat endemic to New Zealand. The glowworms eat midges, and harvestmen prey on the glowworms.

New Zealand longfin eels live in the Waitomo Stream and can be seen at the exit of the cave.

In 2022, it was discovered that koi carp had appeared in the stream in the Glowworm Grotto. Scientists investigated whether or not a fish weir downstream to keep koi out might lead to increased flooding in the cave.

Lampenflora, a community of organisms formed mostly from algae and cyanobacteria, has become established in the cave. It forms a biofilm which is a threat to delicate rock surfaces. Lampenflora forms where there is light, such as the fixed lights in the cave needed for tourist purposes. Various methods have been used to remove lampenflora from surfaces within the cave without damaging the rock formations.

=== Glowworms ===
Glowworms live in caves and on sheltered banks in native bush where humidity is high, as moisture helps to maintain their silk structures that capture prey. At the Waitomo Glowworm Cave, glowworms are found in the Demonstration Chamber and on the ceiling of the Glowworm Grotto, a large chamber on the lower level of the cave. The Waikato Stream runs through these chambers, providing aquatic prey insects for the glowworms as well as the humidity they require. Adult gnats are around the size of an average mosquito. The larval stage and the imago produce a blue-green bioluminescence. Glowworm larvae build a mucous tube that hangs horizontally from the rock and is attached by a network of threads. Long threads hang down from the attachment threads. These have evenly-spaced sticky droplets on them, with the multiple hanging threads forming a curtain effect. The glowworm larvae lure prey with their blue light, and the prey gets stuck on the sticky droplets on the hanging threads. A midge, Anatopynia debilis (=Tanypus debilis, Chironomidae), is the main prey for glowworms in the cave. Midge larvae live in mud and the stream inside the cave.

The cave had to close between April and July 1979 because glowworm numbers had decreased significantly after the upper entrance door was replaced in 1975. The new door had a grill that allowed air to flow through the cave, drying out the glowworms and increasing the temperature, which in turn encouraged growth of a glowworm-killing fungus. The problem was rectified, and glowworms from other caves were transplanted to the cave to build up the population so that the cave could reopen to tourists.

Photo-monitoring of the glowworms between 2009 and 2013 showed that they glowed on a 24-hour cycle, appearing to reach peak intensity in the late afternoon.

== Cave monitoring ==
Environmental management of the Waitomo Glowworm Cave balances protecting the cave and glowworms with enabling visitors to enjoy them. The main issues are carbon dioxide (CO_{2}) levels and humidity. The size of tour groups and length of time they spend in the cave affects the carbon dioxide concentration in the cave, since visitors' respiration combined with limited ventilation increases carbon dioxide levels. Increased carbon dioxide can form carbonic acid which damages calcite features in the cave. But if ventilation is too high then the cave dries out, which is harmful to the glowworms. The cave has two entrances at different levels. Air exchange with the outside occurs via a 'chimney' effect, with the direction of air flow depending on the whether the temperature outside is higher or lower than the temperature inside the cave. On days when there is little temperature difference inside and outside the cave, there is little airflow. Visitors' body heat and lighting required for tours also affect the microclimate of the cave.

During the COVID-19 lockdown in New Zealand in March and April 2020, there was a period of 60 days during which no staff or tourists visited the cave. This allowed scientists to study the natural carbon dioxide levels and microclimate within the cave. It was discovered that carbon dioxide varied and tended to sit at levels above that of the external atmosphere. Rain outside the cave caused drip water inside the cave and changes in the level of the underground stream, influencing carbon dioxide levels in the cave.

The glowworms of the Waitomo Glowworm Cave are closely guarded by a Scientific Advisory Group. This group has automated equipment that continually monitors the air quality especially the carbon dioxide levels, rock and air temperature, and humidity. Data from this equipment is carefully analysed by specialist staff. The advisory group uses the information to establish how the cave should be managed. They determine if and when air flow patterns should be changed and how many people are allowed to visit the cave each day.

== Tourism ==
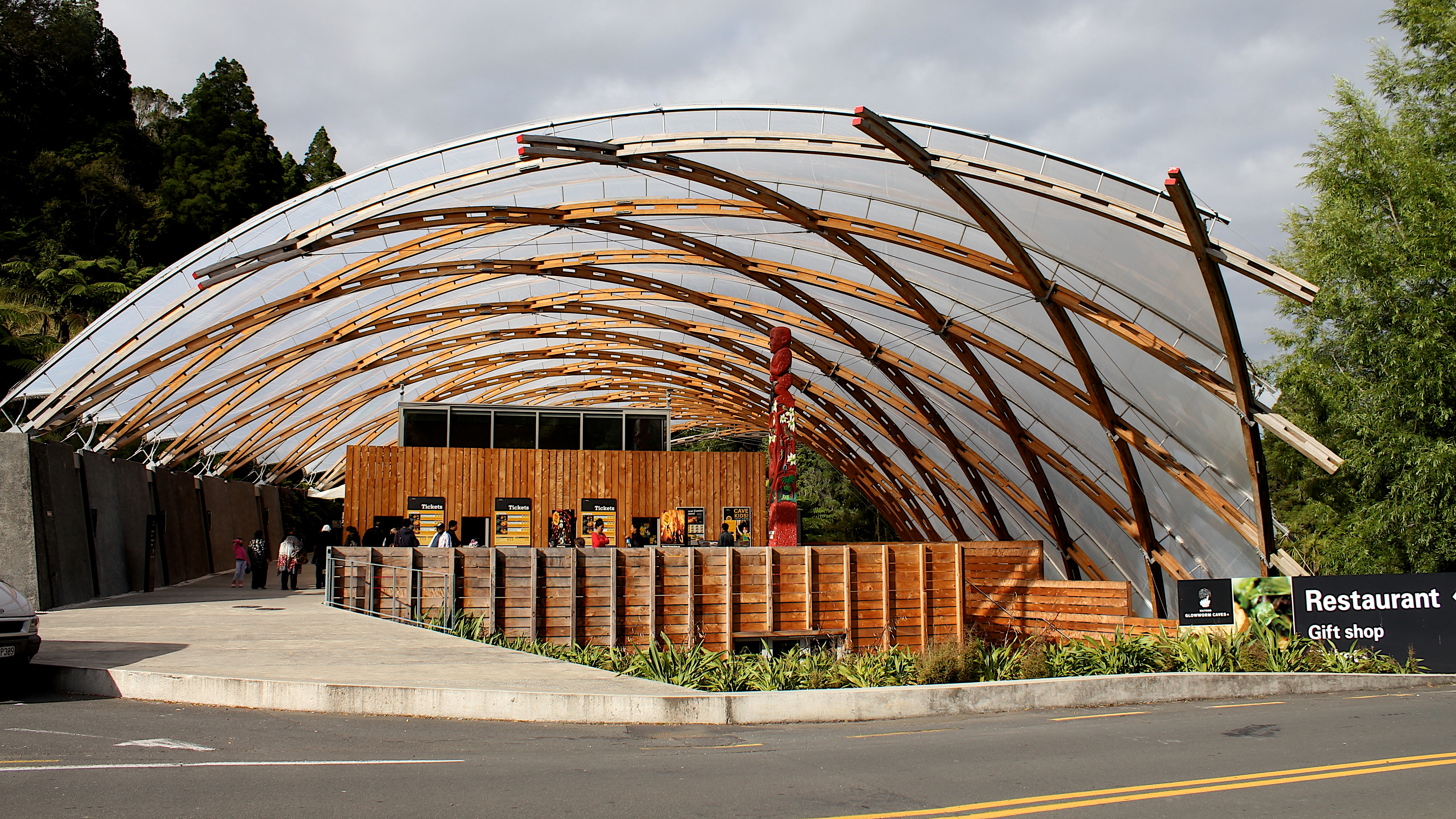
Visitor Centre

Public access to the Waitomo Glowworm Cave is via a guided tour. The tour through the cave brings the visitor through the different levels, beginning at the top level of the cave and the Catacombs. The visitor then goes down into the Cathedral, demonstration platform, and the jetty. The tour concludes with a boat ride through the Glowworm Grotto, taking the visitor onto the underground Waitomo Stream where the only light comes from the tiny glowworms creating a sky of living lights. The guide pulls the boat along by means of an overhead wire, so that it glides quietly through the water.

Parties of visitors have entered the cave almost every single day since 1945. The cave was closed for several months during 1979 and also closed during New Zealand's nationwide lockdown in 2020 during the COVID-19 pandemic. Before the pandemic, about 500,000 tourists visited the cave each year, and by 2024 visitor numbers had increased back to pre-Covid levels.

=== Visitor Centre ===
The visitor centre at the Waitomo Glowworm Cave was opened in October 2010 after the previous centre burned down in 2005. Designed by Christopher Kelly of Architecture Workshop, the new building gained several architecture and building awards. It was awarded the New Zealand Architecture Medal in 2011. The New Zealand Institute of Architects' citation for the medal said that the building was a "transcendent structure, poetic in its form and protean in its readings". The roof of the visitor centre is constructed from crisscrossing wooden beams covered with ETFE air cushions, a design that evokes a traditional Māori eel trap. Facilities at the visitor centre include tourist muster areas, a 250-seat dining area, a café, a gift shop, seminar and exhibition areas and a theatre.

A pou (traditional carved pole) at the entrance to the building was carved by local people. It depicts Tāne Mahuta (god of the forest), a kawau bird, glowworms, an eel and other symbols special to the Waitomo area and people.

== Location ==
The Waitomo Glowworm Cave is located in the northern King Country region of the North Island of New Zealand, 12 km northwest of Te Kūiti. This cave is about two hours south of Auckland, one hour south of Hamilton, and two hours west of Rotorua by car.
