= Tourism in New Zealand =

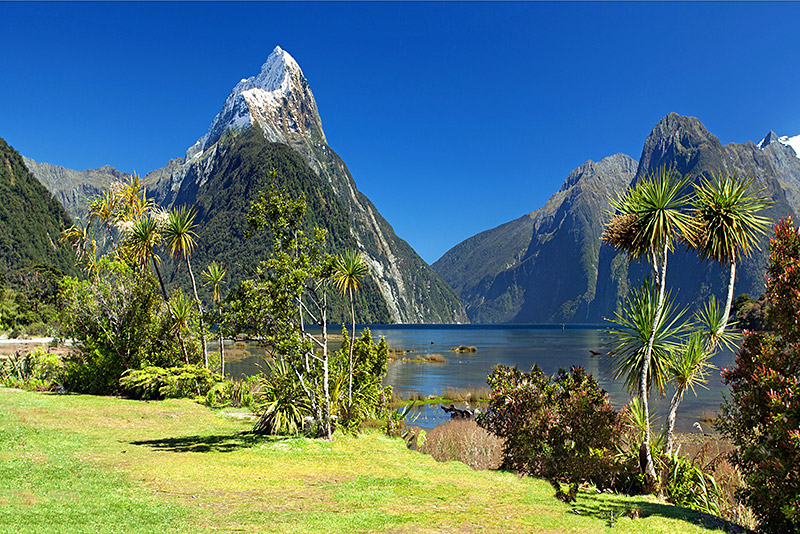
Milford Sound, one of New Zealand's most popular tourist destinations

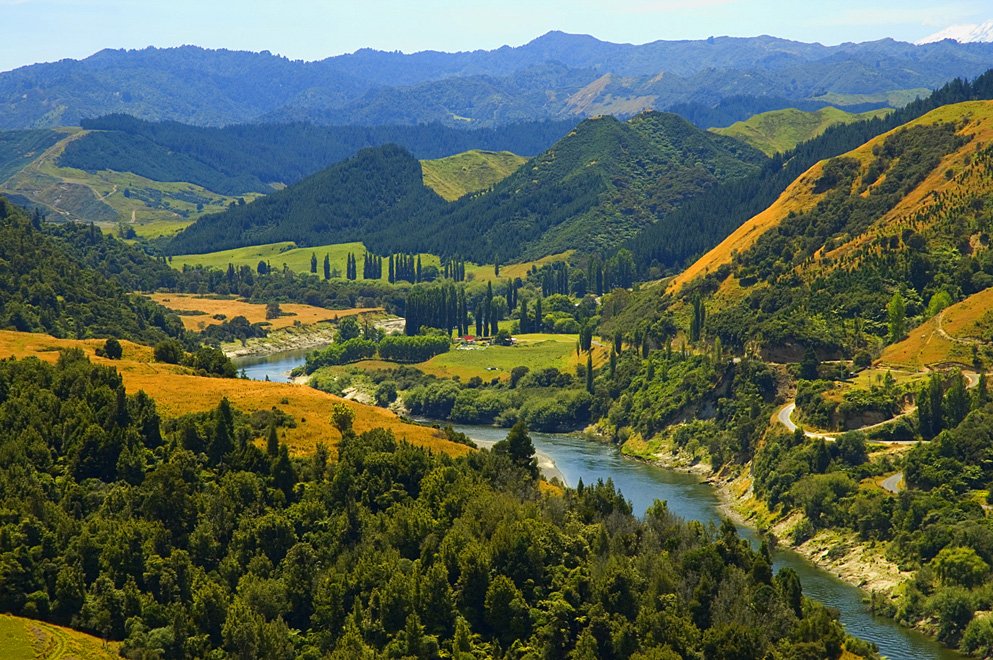
Hills above the Whanganui River

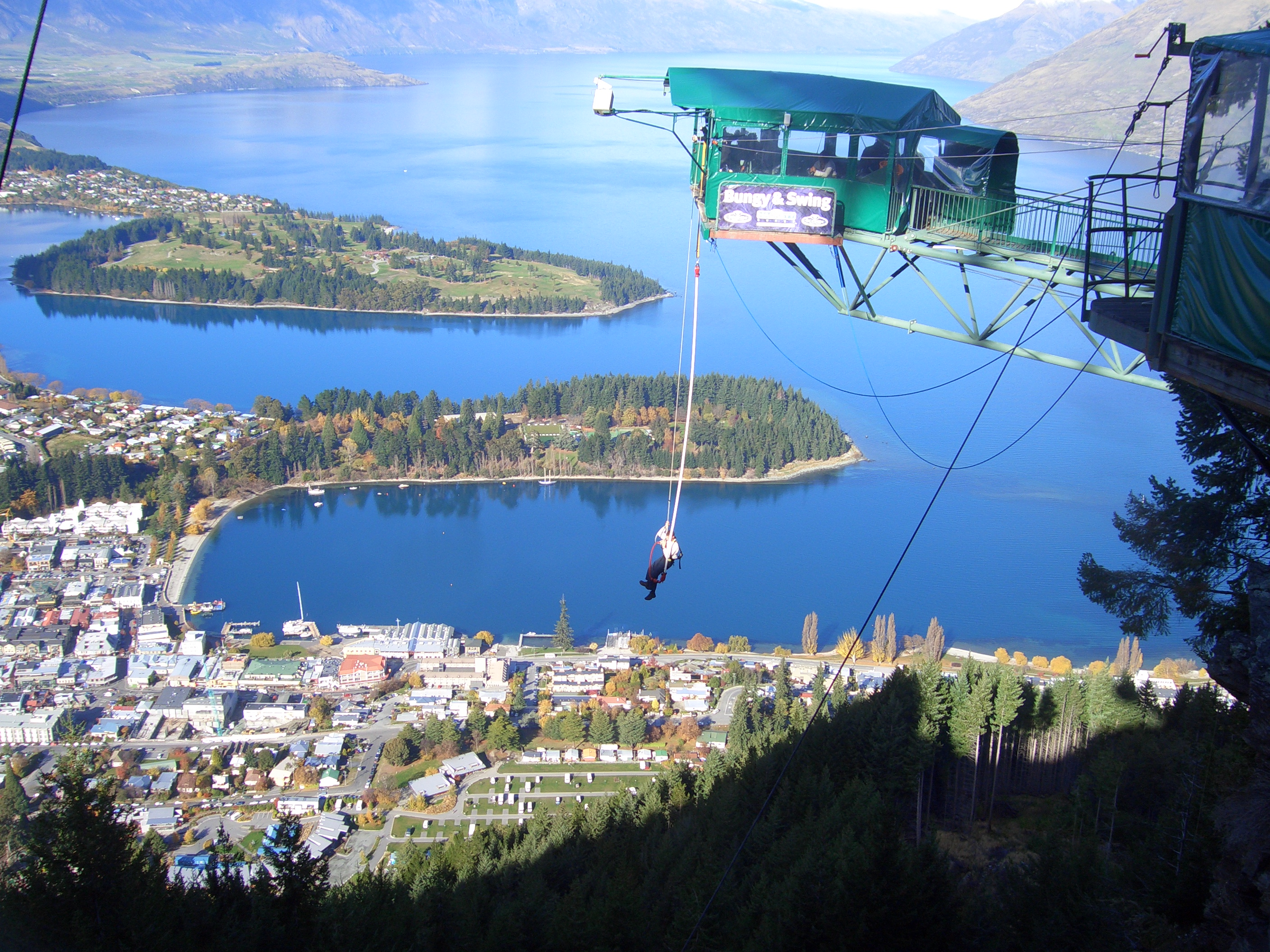
Bungee jumping has become a popular activity in the resort town of Queenstown.

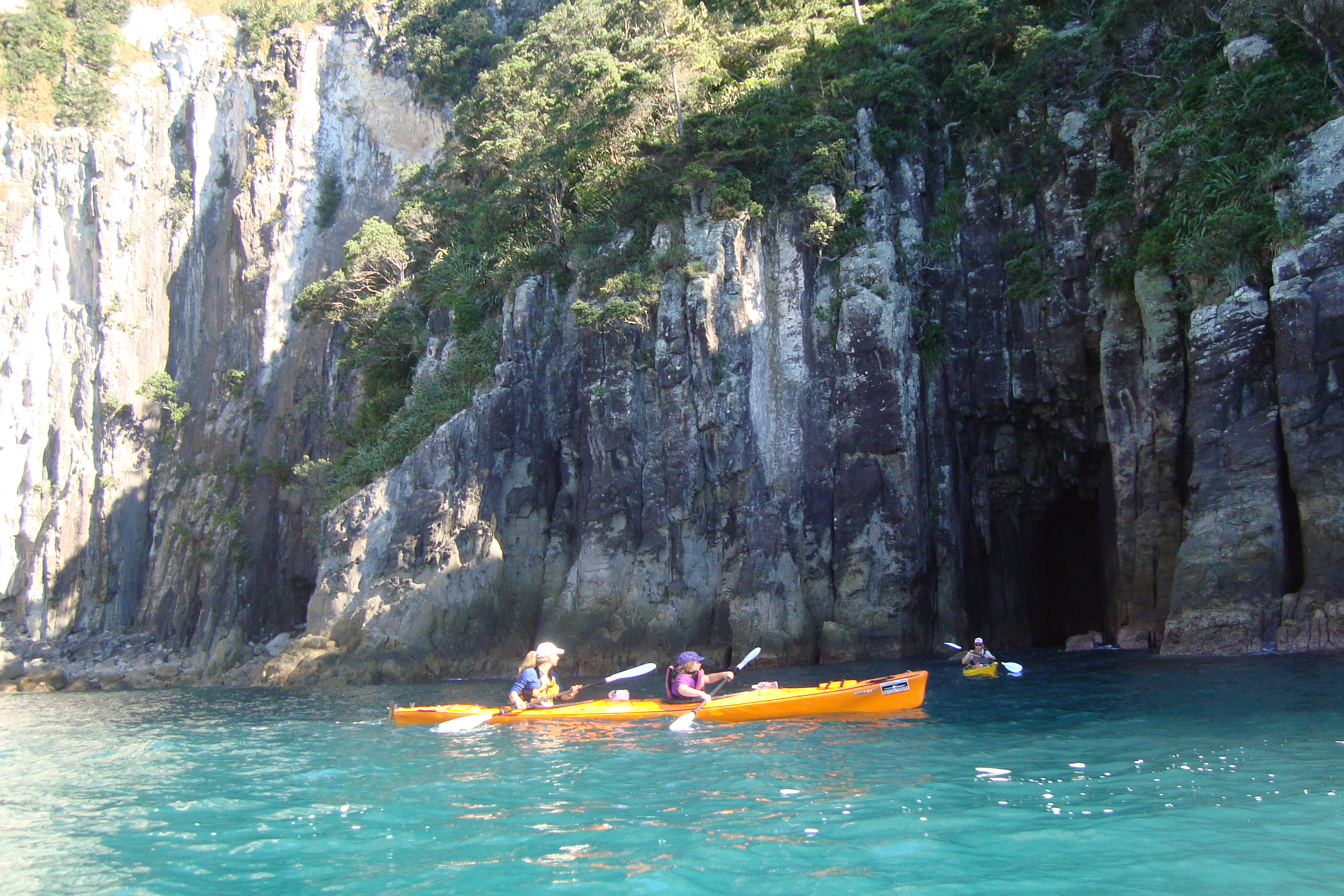
Sea-kayaking from Hahei

Tourism in New Zealand comprised an important sector of the national economy – tourism directly contributed NZ$16.2 billion (or 5.8%) of the country's GDP in the year ending March 2019. As of 2016 tourism supported 188,000 full-time-equivalent jobs (nearly 7.5% of New Zealand's workforce). The flow-on effects of tourism indirectly contributed a further 4.3% of GDP (or NZ$9.8 billion). Despite the country's geographical isolation, spending by international tourists accounted for 17.1% of New Zealand's export earnings (nearly NZ$12 billion). International and domestic tourism contributed, in total, NZ$34 billion to New Zealand's economy every year as of 2017.

New Zealand markets itself abroad as a "clean, green" adventure-playground (Tourism New Zealand's main marketing slogan, "100% Pure New Zealand", reflects this), emphasising as typical tourist destinations nature areas such as Milford Sound, Abel Tasman National Park and the Tongariro Alpine Crossing; while activities such as bungee jumping or whale watching exemplify typical tourist attractions, marketed primarily to individual and small-group travellers. Australia provides by far the largest group of New Zealand's international tourists (about 45%), due to its close proximity (three to four hours by plane) and traditional good relations. Mainland China, the United States and the United Kingdom are the next three largest markets.

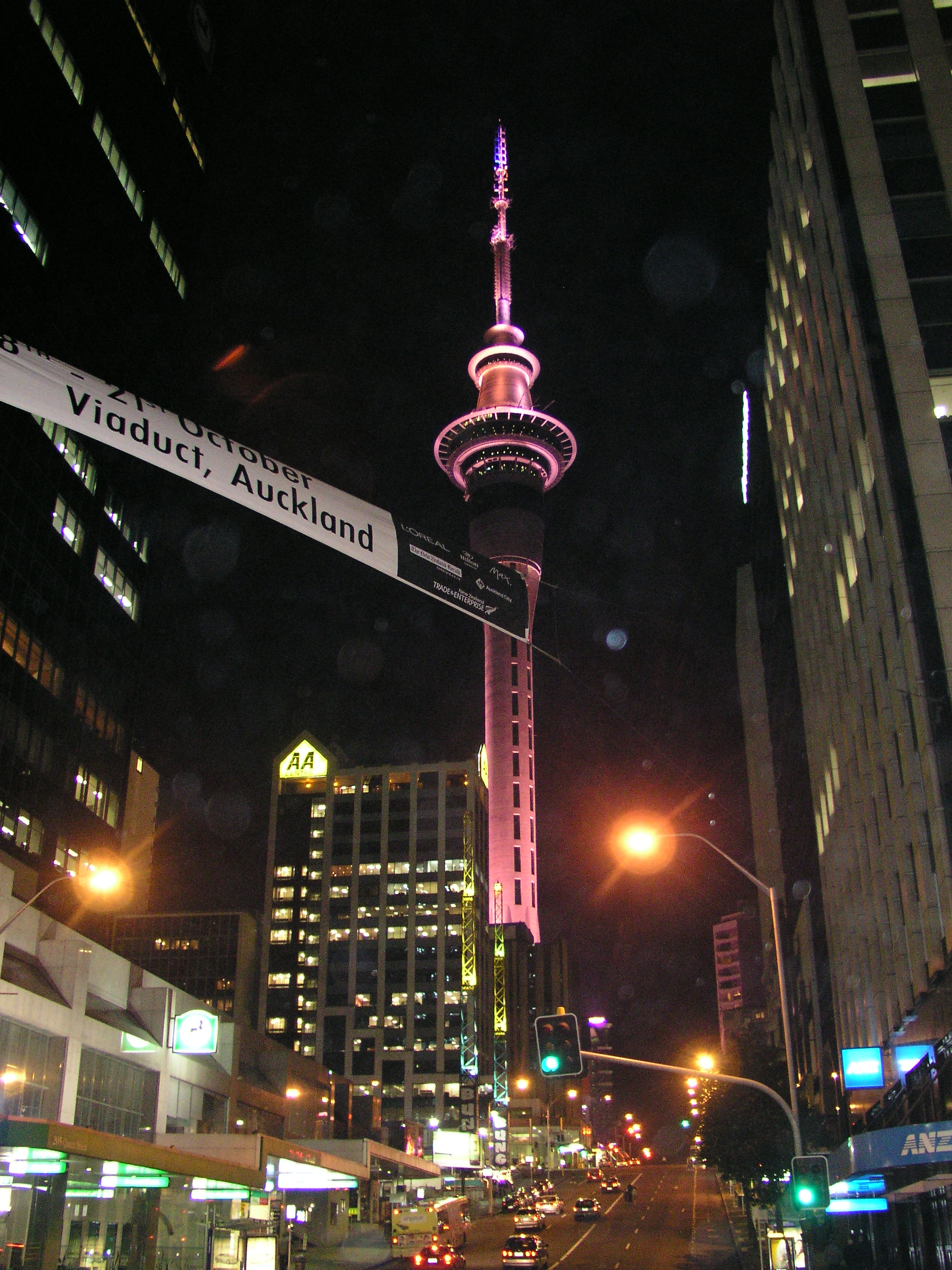
The Sky Tower, a popular attraction in Auckland, serves as an observation tower as well as featuring a revolving restaurant.

The vast majority of international tourist arrivals to New Zealand come through Auckland Airport, which handled 11.5 million international passengers in 2019. Two per cent of visitors arrived by sea as of 2009. Many international tourists spend time in Auckland, Christchurch, Queenstown, Rotorua, and Wellington. Other high-profile destinations include the Bay of Islands, the Waitomo Caves, Aoraki / Mount Cook, and Milford Sound. Many tourists travel considerable distances through the country during their stays, typically using coach lines or hired cars. Though some destinations have seasonal specialities (for winter sports, for example), New Zealand's southern-hemisphere location offers attractions for off-peak northern-hemisphere tourists chasing or avoiding certain seasons. In June 2018 the New Zealand government announced the imposition of a "tourist tax" of around NZ$25 to NZ$35 for international visitors, excluding Australians, many Pacific islanders, and young children. It planned to implement this taxation in 2019 through a newly proposed electronic travel-registration process.

== History ==
New Zealand was the first country to dedicate a government department to tourism. In 1901, the Department of Tourist and Health Resorts came into being. Through most of the 20th century, that department operated hotels though the Tourism Hotel Corporation and put together itineraries around New Zealand, as well as advertised New Zealand as a destination. Popular destinations included Milford Sound.

== International travel ==
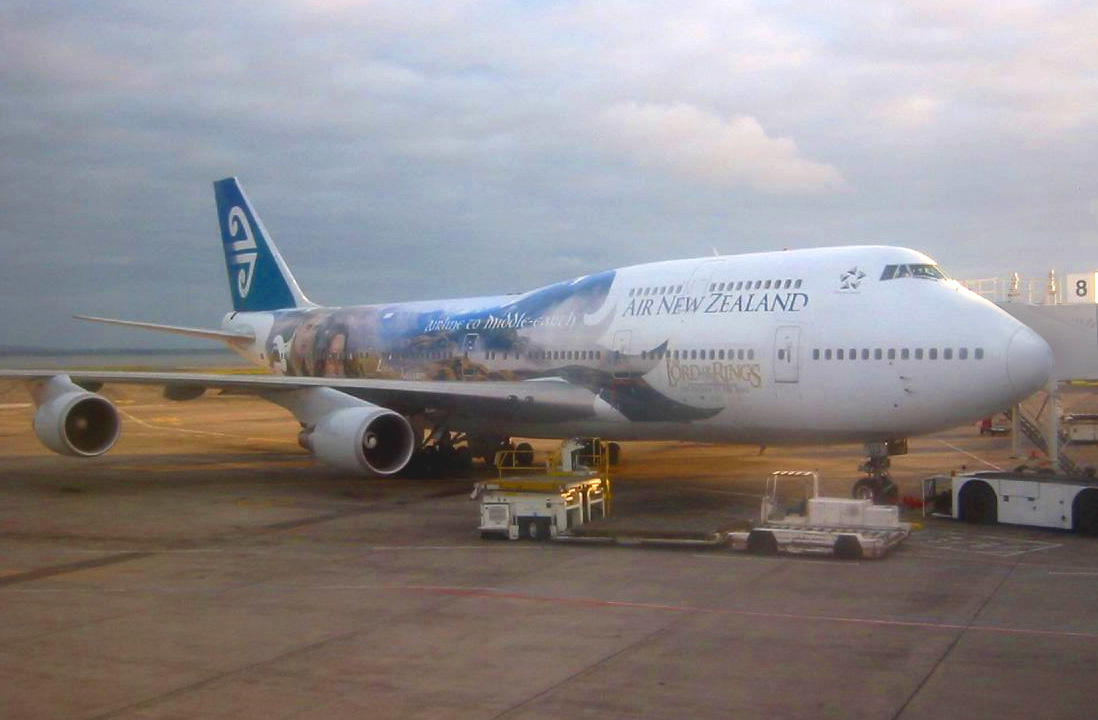
Air New Zealand plane with The Lord of the Rings livery. The film series, shot in New Zealand, may have contributed to the increase in annual tourism numbers in the early 21st century.

=== Overview ===
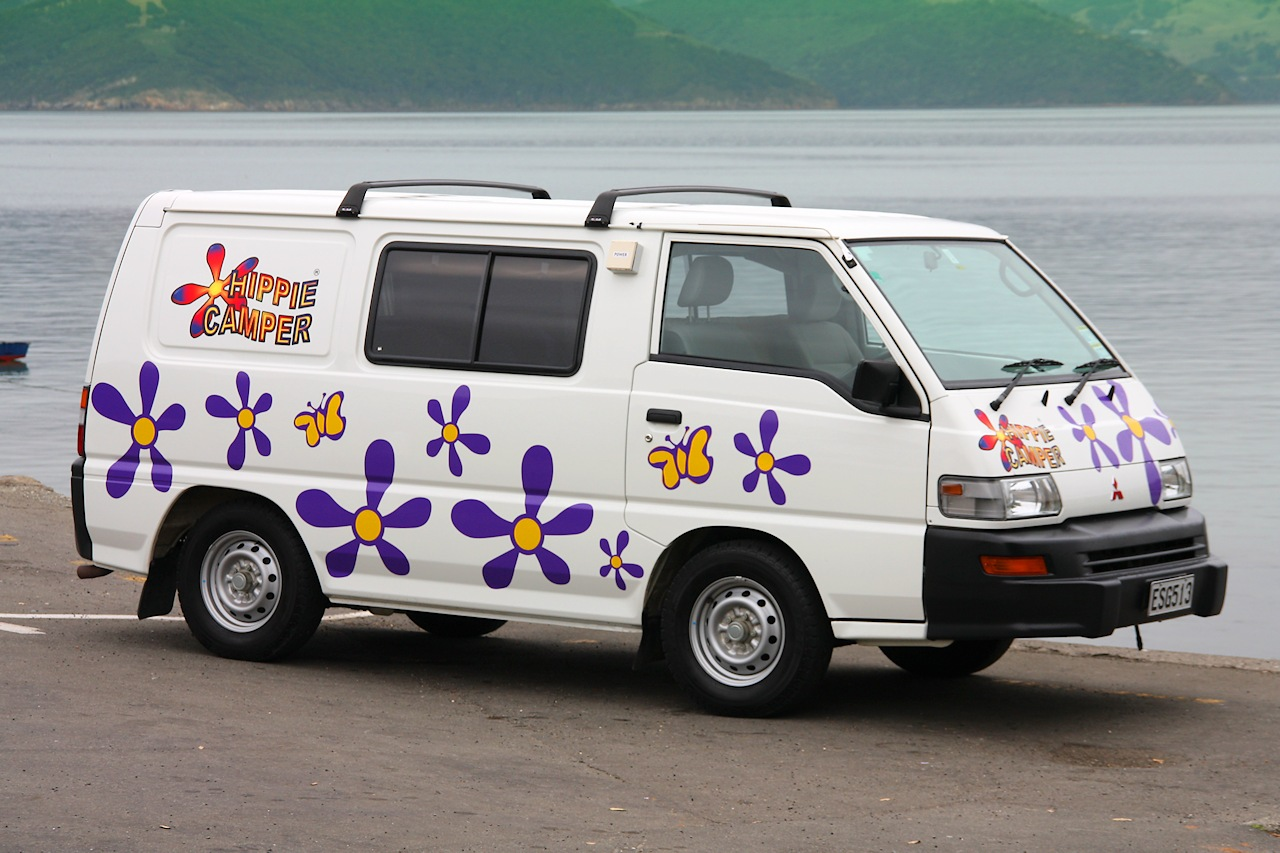
Camper vans offer one of the choices for budget travel in New Zealand.

The country is internationally seen as a top holiday destination, as shown by being voted most favourite destination by the readers of the Condé Nast Traveler magazine (specialising in luxury travel) in 2008, though it slipped to second place in 2009. A 2007 Daily Telegraph poll, the United Kingdom's largest such poll, also identified New Zealand as the best overseas holiday destination. Between 2000 (the start of an advertising campaign by Tourism New Zealand) and 2007 the number of Britons visiting New Zealand increased by 61%. In November 2012 readers of the UK newspaper The Telegraph voted New Zealand the best country in the world to go to on holiday.

The availability of air travel is a large contributing factor to market growth. After Air New Zealand launched non-stop flights from Auckland to Buenos Aires in December 2015, visitor numbers from Argentina tripled, from 5,400 in 2015 to 15,300 in 2016.

Tourism New Zealand, the country's official tourism agency, actively promotes the country as a destination worldwide. Activities have included a NZ$7 million campaign in China, concentrating on Shanghai, and co-operating to produce a New Zealand tourism layer for Google Earth, the first such country-wide initiative.

Visitors from 60 countries require a New Zealand eTA (NZ eTA) from 1 October 2019.

From March 2020, New Zealand government implemented strict quarantine provisions to prevent the spread of COVID-19 pandemic across the nationwide, and the numbers of incoming international visitors dropped dramatically. The tourism sector responded with a strategy of hunker and hope. A brief reopening of borders with Australia ("Travel bubble") from April 2021 encountered official "pauses" and "suspension" (July 2021) as COVID-19 Deltacron hybrid variant took hold in different Australian states. In September 2024, New Zealand announced to increase its International Visitor Conservation and Tourism Levy from NZ$35 to NZ$100 starting on 1 October 2024, to boost economic growth and ensure tourists contribute to public services. While the government believed this wouldn't significantly deter visitors, Tourism Industry Aotearoa (TIA) warned that the higher fee might discourage tourism, especially as the country struggled to recover to pre-pandemic visitor numbers. The tax hike was not applied to tourists from Australia and the Pacific, and additional visa fees would also rise.

=== Environmental impacts ===
Public concern over the environmental impacts of air travel may threaten tourism growth in New Zealand, as almost all tourists fly long distances to reach New Zealand. However, Ministry of Tourism data in 2007 predicted a four per cent annual growth in tourist numbers in New Zealand, with 3.2 million tourists annually to be reached in 2014. However, it remains unclear how New Zealand's carbon-neutral policy will affect future tourism – with some researchers arguing that the carbon emissions of tourism are much higher than generally considered, that their offsetting or mitigation will be very difficult, and that this poses a serious threat to the country's major source of foreign income.

== Domestic travel ==
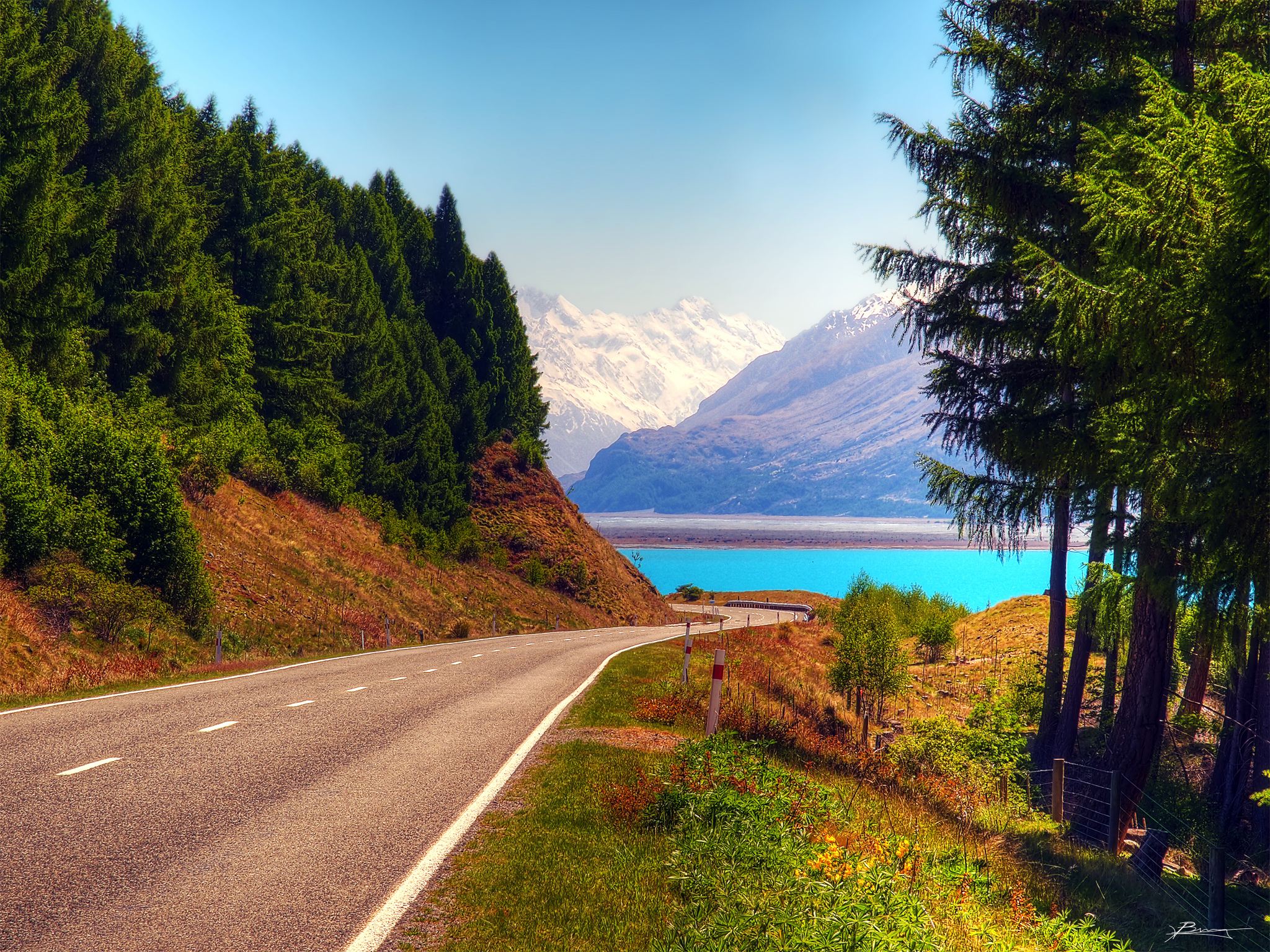
The road to Mount Cook

Periodic campaigns are also directed at New Zealanders, urging them to travel within New Zealand instead of overseas, due to a perception by the tourism industry that too many New Zealanders are travelling to Australia or other countries instead of domestically. Perhaps the best-known slogan is "Don't leave town until you've seen the country".

Air travel is a popular way of getting around the country due to the lack of transport alternatives over longer distances (for example, going from Auckland to Napier, a 400 km journey takes just over an hour by plane compared to nearly five hours by car or seven hours by bus.

Passenger trains are limited to Auckland-Wellington, Picton-Christchurch and Christchurch-Greymouth, scenic daytrip journeys which often cost more than an airfare. Outside of trunk routes connecting main cities (Auckland, Wellington, Christchurch, Dunedin, Queenstown), airfares can, due to a lack of competition, cost nearly as much as trips to Australia.

Domestic tourism spending still exceeds that of international tourism; in the year to March 2020, domestic tourists spent $24.4 billion compared to $17.5 billion spent by international tourists. However, the economy suffered from COVID-19 pandemic, when the borders were closed to the international tourists and other visitors from 2020 to 2022, and the tourism sector is expected to take years to recover.

== Tourist activities ==
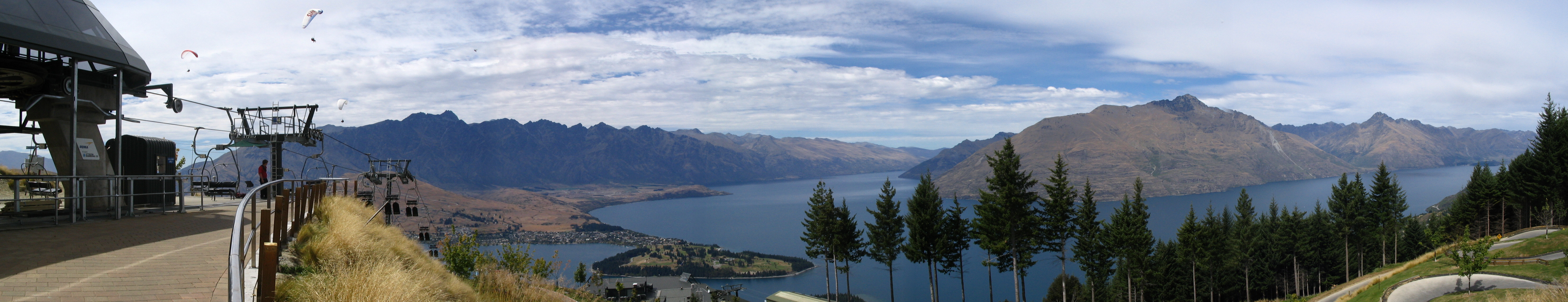
Queenstown is known for its commerce-oriented tourism, especially adventure and ski tourism.

Popular tourist activities in New Zealand include sightseeing, adventure tourism, tramping (hiking) and camping. To support active travel, New Zealand has numerous walking and hiking paths (often created and maintained by the DOC), some of which, like the Milford Track, have huge international recognition. There is also a walking route the length of the country (Te Araroa) and the New Zealand Cycle Trail.

== Statistics ==
Yearly tourist arrivals in millions

=== International markets ===
The top countries for international visitor arrivals to New Zealand in terms of their nationality are as follows.

Country	2020	2021	2022	2023	2024
Australia	359,781	160,248	829,168	1,257,933	1,385,323
United States	124,818	5,153	110,275	337,306	369,635
China	58,508	1,644	16,997	151,297	248,478
United Kingdom	94,255	6,034	87,959	167,002	179,856
India	18,179	1,622	20,282	84,399	82,878
South Korea	26,326	476	14,201	58,237	70,036
Germany	36,671	750	23,376	59,872	69,239
Japan	25,784	561	12,732	51,976	68,260
Canada	30,791	1,030	24,217	57,963	63,447
Singapore	9,373	1,249	33,919	47,388	56,409
Taiwan	13,260	242	5,429	33,359	47,075
Fiji	7,710	658	16,601	39,980	42,535
Hong Kong	13,125	817	9,365	25,832	33,517
Philippines	5,398	1,264	8,334	31,162	31,623
Malaysia	5,491	298	11,684	28,861	29,340
Other countries	166,900	24,816	209,293	524,376	536,151
Total	996,350	206,862	1,433,832	2,956,940	3,313,802

Australia accounted for 41.8 per cent of New Zealand visitor arrivals in 2024. Broken down by state, New South Wales accounted for 451,767 visitors, followed by Queensland with 373,187 visitors, and Victoria with 318,491 visitors.

Of the top 14 nationalities, all except India, China, Philippines and Fiji are entitled to visa waivers, while all except the United Kingdom, India, Germany, and the Philippines have non-stop flights to New Zealand.

== See also ==
- Visa policy of New Zealand
- Tourism New Zealand, official tourism agency
- Tolkien tourism, on the effects of The Lord of the Rings films
- List of museums in New Zealand
- List of World Heritage Sites in New Zealand
