= Waitomo Caves Discovery Centre =

Museum in New Zealand

Coordinates: 38°15′39″S 175°06′33″E

The Waitomo Caves Discovery Centre is a museum located in the town of Waitomo in the North Island of New Zealand. The museum is also referred to as the Waitomo Caves Discovery Centre, the Waitomo Museum of Caves and the Waitomo Education Centre.

== Establishment ==
The museum was established in 1973 by the local community and is run by a charitable trust. The museum was originally located in two rooms of the historic Waitomo Caves Hotel. During its first five years of operation, the community raised money for a purpose-built location in the Waitomo Caves township and the building was opened in late 1981. The ceremony was held on 17 October 1981, and the museum was opened by Jim Bolger, MP for the King Country and Minister of Labour.

The land upon which the museum now stands belongs to the Tanetinorau Opataia Whānau Trust, to whom it was returned in 1988. The tupuna, Tane Tinorau, lived on the land known as Taware prior to its being compulsorily acquired under Acts of Parliament.

In 1989, the museum buildings were doubled in size to increase exhibition space and add a 50-seat AV theatre, and the new rooms were opened by David Bellamy. An Education Centre was added in 1994, and the museum has been contracted by the Ministry of Education to provide LEOTC (Learning Experience outside the Classroom) programmes since that year.

== Collection ==
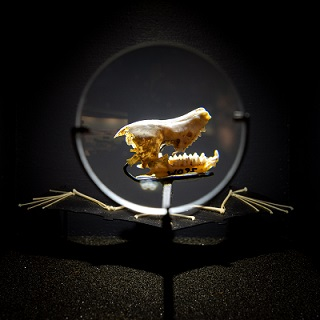
Bat skeleton, Waitomo Caves Museum collection (Corin Walker Bain, 2020)

The Waitomo Caves Museum has a small but significant subfossil palaeofaunal collection (bones of extinct species), owing to the plentiful tomo (the dolines or sinkholes for which Waitomo is named) scattered throughout the surrounding karst landscape. It holds fossil remains and speleological specimens from local caves. The museum has a long association with geological and palaeontological experts, such as Paul W. Williams and Trevor Worthy. Specimens from the museum collection are referenced in dozens of books and published journal articles.

Of particular note are the almost complete skeletal remains of the North Island goose or tarepo (Cnemiornis gracilis), the North Island takahē (Porphyrio mantelli) and various small vertebrates, including frogs, skinks, geckos and bats.

In addition to faunal and geological material, the museum holds archival material relating to the history and occupation of the area, the development of adventure tourism and the history of cave exploration in New Zealand. It houses the NZ Speleological Society library, maps and archives from various caving clubs on their behalf.
