= Ruakuri Cave =

Cave site and burial site in New Zealand

- location in New Zealand
- 38°15′50″S 174°59′40″E
- Location: Waitomo
- Region: New Zealand

Site notes
- Excavation dates: Spiral Drum Entrance 2004-2005
- Owner: Mostly Privately Owned

Ruakuri Cave is one of the longer caves in the Waitomo area of New Zealand. It was first discovered by local Māori between 400 and 500 years ago. The name Te Ruakuri, or "The Den of Dogs" (as it is referred to by the local hapū) was given to the surrounding area when wild dogs were discovered living in the entrance of the cave.

One of the cave entrances was used by Māori as an urupā or burial site. As a sacred area it is no longer used for tourism; however, it is now accessed by a spiral drum entrance built some distance away from the tapu (sacred) site where tours now run since 2005.

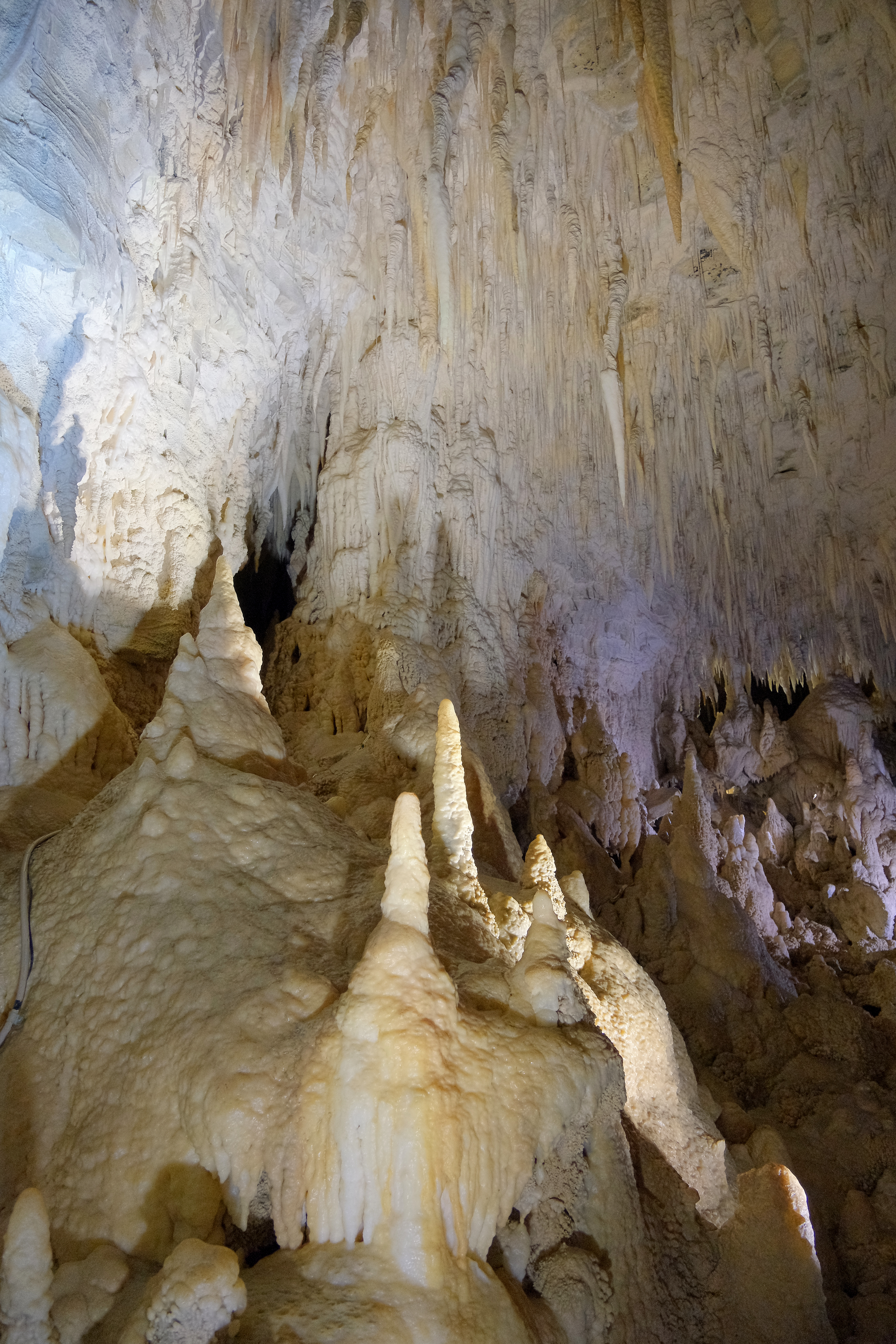
Lit up cave formations

Ruakuri is the only wheelchair-accessible cave in the Southern Hemisphere. It is well known for its spiritual links to Māori and its unusual limestone formations and caverns.

Major features of the Ruakuri Cave include Holdens Cavern (named after James Holden who first opened the cave to the public), The Drum Passage, The Pretties and The Ghost Passage.

The cave was open to the public from 1904 until 1988, when it was closed due to a legal and financial dispute. It was reopened in 2005.

Inside there is a dynamic natural environment, with glowworms, limestone formations, underground rivers, and hidden waterfalls.

== Guided tours ==
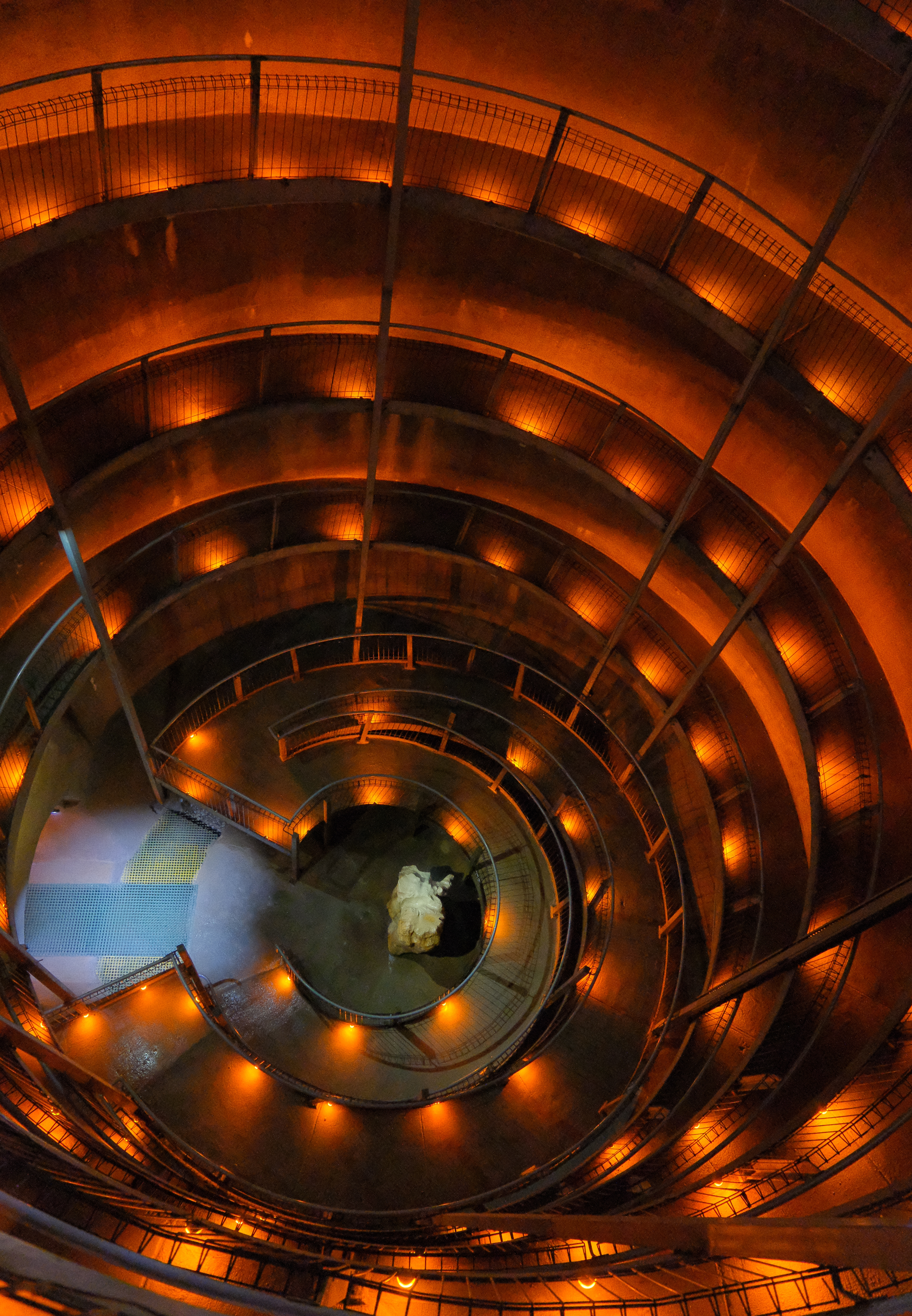
Access via spiral ramp

The guided tour through the Ruakuri Cave starts down a long spiral ramp to the bottom of the cave. This leads to a room full of stalactites, and rare limestone formations that have been created over millions of years. Some of them are covered with a kind of coral (known locally as "popcorn"). There are also underground rivers and waterfalls. The waterfall is only around one and a half metres tall, but it sounds much louder underground.

Since 1987 there have been 3 adventure tours run through this cave, with 2 still operating most days.

Also in the cave are fossils from the time when the area was beneath the sea. There are still living creatures in the cave such as the glowworms for which the Waitomo Caves are famous. The glowworms cover the cave's walls with pinpricks of light, giving the effect of a starry night.

The glowworms are the larvae of fungus gnats that spend most of their lives in the larval state. They feed on insects that fly into the cave; they also eat one another. The presence of life and light in a place that should be dark and dead is the reason Māori thought this place sacred.

== See also ==
- Waitomo Glowworm Caves
- List of caves in New Zealand
