= New Zealand Speleological Society =

New Zealand national caving organisation

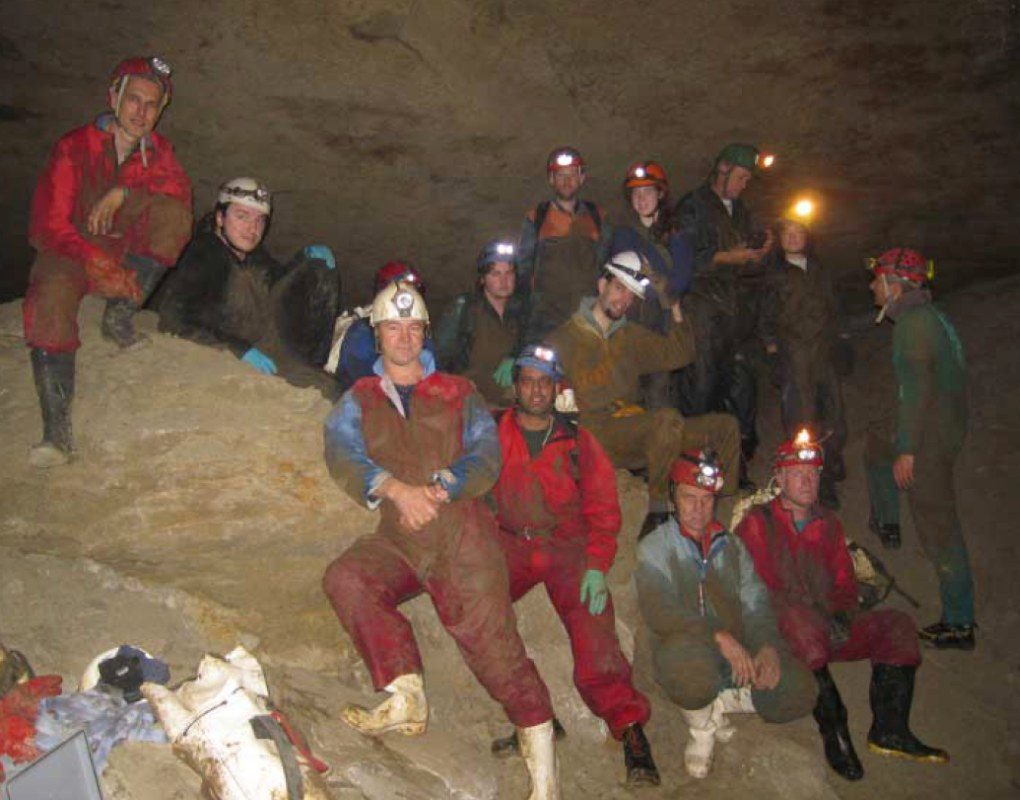
A New Zealand group of cavers posing for a group photo in a Waitomo-area cave.

New Zealand Speleological Society is a national organisation for recreational cavers in New Zealand.

It was formed in 1949 by Henry Lambert and had approximately 300 members in 2010.

== Mission ==
Their stated mission is:

- To be the national speleological body
- To conserve caves and karst
- To represent the interests of its members

By:

- The collection and appropriate dissemination of information on caves, karst and caving
- Advocating conservation and awareness to cave owners and managers
- Negotiating access to caves for members
- The promotion of safe cave use
- Operating a national cave search and rescue system
- Encouraging cave users to join NZSS
- Monitoring the effects of cave use

Through:

- Education and training
- Development and assessment of techniques and equipment
- Liaison with other groups and agencies
- Exploration and study of caves

The society also maintains the library at the Waitomo Caves Museum.

== See also ==
- Caving in New Zealand
