= Harwoods Hole =

Cave system in South Island, New Zealand

Coordinates: 40.9501°S 172.8694°E

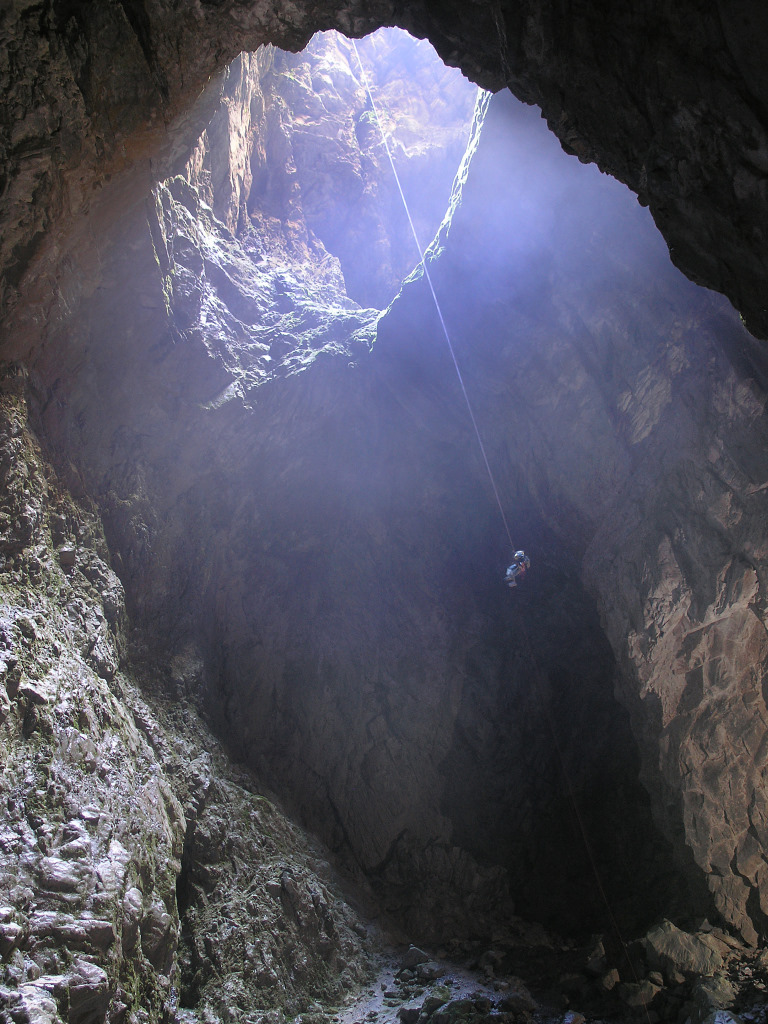
- A caver abseiling into Harwoods Hole
- Interactive map of Harwoods Hole
- Location: South Island, New Zealand
- Length: Height: 357 metres (1,171 ft); Opening: 50 metres (160 ft)
- Hazards: Free fall

Harwoods Hole is a cave system located in the northwest of the South Island of New Zealand, in the Abel Tasman National Park. At 183 metres (600 ft), it is New Zealand's deepest vertical shaft. It was first explored in 1958, long after it was discovered. The track to Harwoods Hole is no longer marked or maintained by the Department of Conservation (DOC).

== Formation ==
Evidence suggests that run-off from an area of approximately 20 square km converged into a stream that then flowed down a dry valley to create what is now Harwoods Hole. Since then the river appears to have changed course. Subsequently, Harwoods Hole receives water through sinkholes and surrounding dry valleys; this water then percolates through surrounding rock ensuring it becomes saturated with calcite, before entering the cave where the calcite is deposited. This second phase means that rather than expanding, Harwoods Hole is being filled in.

== History ==
It is one of several important cave systems in Tākaka Hill, between Golden Bay and Tasman Bay. Starting at the surface as a 50-metre (160 ft) diameter entrance and descending 183 metres (600 ft), Harwoods Hole is New Zealand's deepest vertical shaft. Further in it connects with Starlight Cave. The long rope descent is considered one of the most spectacular parts of the caving experience at Harwoods. Harwoods Hole has an overall depth, defined as height above sea level of entry to height of outlet, of 357 metres (1,171 ft).

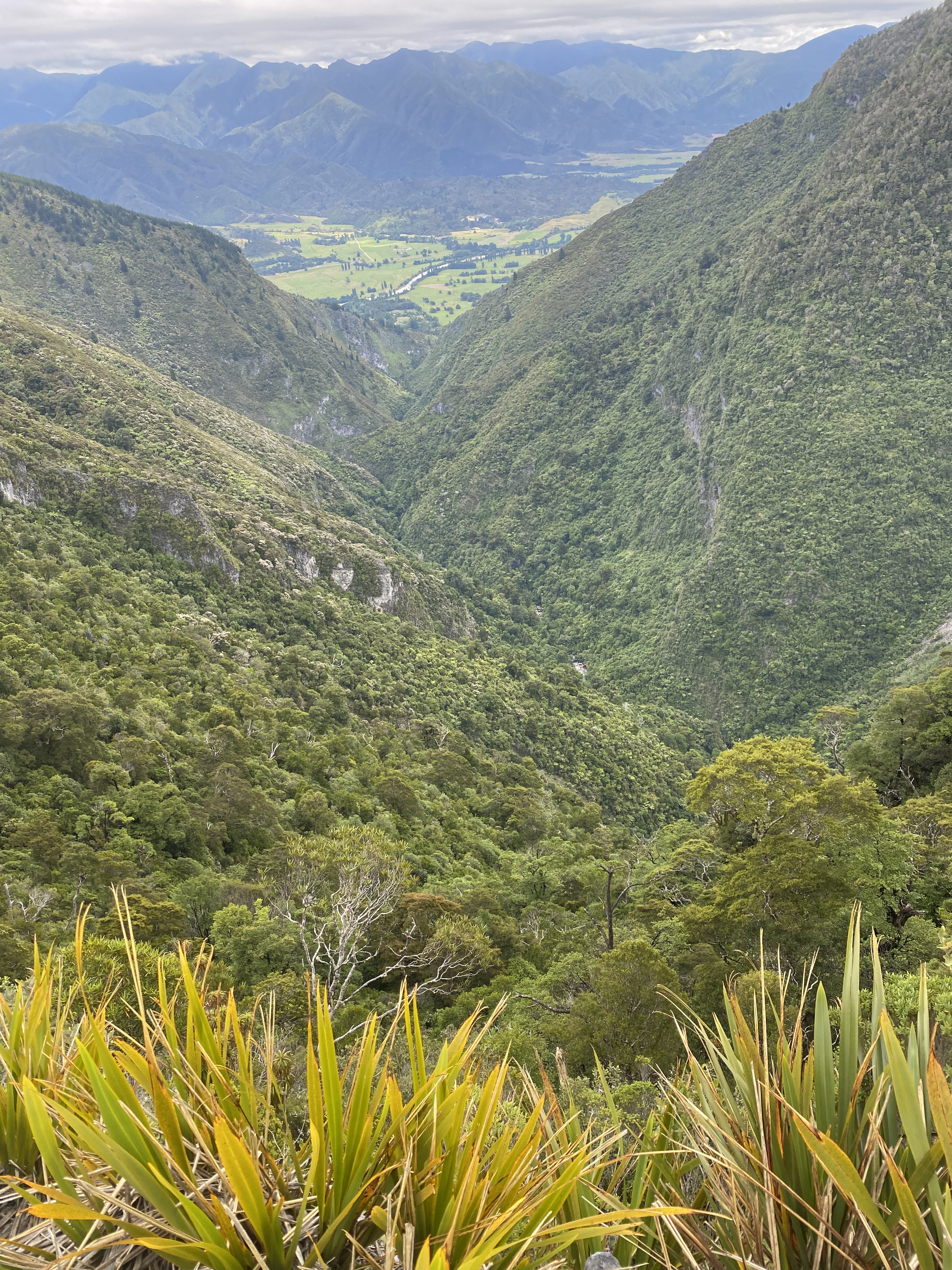
The valley of The Gorge Creek

Henry Harwood (1844–1927), with John Horton and Thomas Manson, opened up the Canaan Downs area and discovered Harwoods Hole, though it was not immediately entered. It remained untouched until seven cavers explored it over the 1958/59 summer. With a home-built winch weighing 255 kilograms (562 lb), the first person was lowered down on 28 December 1958. Upon completion of the initial exploration, Harwoods Hole became the deepest explored cave in New Zealand, a record that was later broken by Nettlebed Cave in the nearby Mount Arthur region.

The following summer, 21 cavers explored Harwoods Hole further. The team was also interested in finding the outflow of the underground stream. They suspected that The Gorge Creek at East Tākaka was the outlet as the flow rate matched, and green dye released inside Harwoods Hole was soon visible when it emerged at Starlight Cave, so named by the cavers where The Gorge Creek emerged. With the connection confirmed, a squeeze was widened by gelignite and a connection from Harwoods Hole to East Tākaka for cavers was thus established. On 4 January 1960, Harwoods Hole was the site of the first fatality by a member of the New Zealand Speleological Society when the leader of the caving expedition, Peter Lambert, was killed by rock fall. A cairn at the bottom of the shaft with Lambert's helmet placed on it acts as a memorial.

== Access ==
The Harwoods Hole track is no longer marked or maintained due to the extreme risks at the unfenced hole. These risks include unstable rock platforms and slippery rocks at the hole and therefore the potential for fatal falls. The public can access this site at their own risk, however, the Department of Conservation is not maintaining the track or managing the dangers associated with visiting the site. The campsite, mountain bike tracks and other tramping tracks nearby are not affected by the closure. Near the top of Tākaka Hill on State Highway 60, an unsealed side road leading to Harwoods Hole is sign-posted. After 11 kilometres (6.8 mi), a car park is reached. From here, a 2.9 kilometres (1.8 mi) walking track formerly gave access to Harwoods Hole.

== See also ==
- List of caves in New Zealand
