= Makarau =

Makarau is a surname. Notable people with the surname include:

- Ihar Makarau (born 1979), Belarusian judoka
- Raman Makarau (fl. 2000s), Belarusian Paralympic swimmer
- Rita Makarau, Zimbabwean judge

== See also ==
- Makara
- Makarau River, in New Zealand
