= Waitomo =

Settlement in Waikato, New Zealand

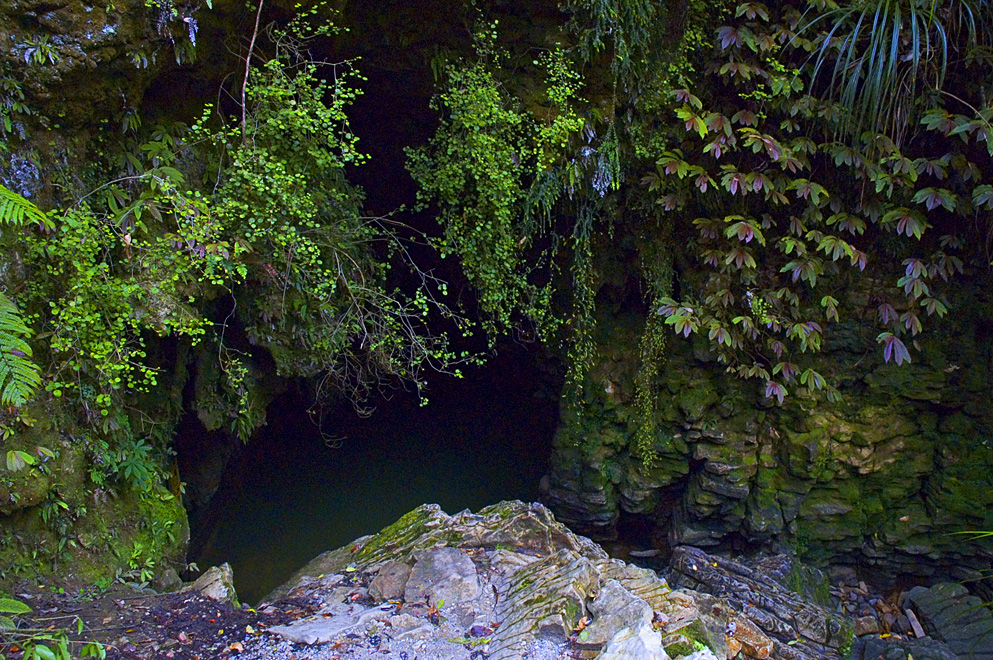
- The entrance to a cave in the Waitomo area
- Interactive map of Waitomo
- Country: New Zealand
- Region: Waikato region
- District: Waitomo District
- Ward: Waitomo Rural Ward
- Electorates: Taranaki-King Country; Te Tai Hauāuru (Māori)

Government
  - Territorial Authority: Waitomo District Council
  - Regional council: Waikato Regional Council
  - Mayor of Waitomo: John Robertson
  - Taranaki-King Country MP: Barbara Kuriger
  - Hauraki-Waikato MP: Hana-Rawhiti Maipi-Clarke
- Time zone: UTC+12 (NZST)
  - Summer (DST): UTC+13 (NZDT)
- Area code: 07

Waitomo, officially Waitomo Caves, is a rural community in the King Country region of New Zealand's North Island. There are several solutional cave systems in the area around the village, which are popular tourist attractions. Restaurants and accommodation are centred in the village to serve visiting tourists.

The word Waitomo comes from the Māori language: wai meaning water and tomo meaning a doline or sinkhole; it can thus be translated to be "water passing through a hole". The caves are formed in Oligocene limestone.

The historic Waitomo Caves Hotel is located in Waitomo Caves village.

== History ==
Māori lived in the Waitomo Caves area in the eighteenth and nineteenth centuries. Opapaka Pā to the east of the village was occupied by Ngāti Hia in the 1700s. One of the first two explorers of the Waitomo Glowworm Cave in 1887 was Tane Tinorau, who lived nearby and knew the entrance to the cave as a good spot for catching eels. Naturalist William Smith described seeing an abandoned Māori village or 'kāinga' of raupō huts across the valley near a lake, while he was travelling between the accommodation at Waitomo Caves and the Ruakuri Cave in 1906.

The village of Waitomo Caves is named for the hundreds of caves present in the spectacular karst landscape. The limestone landscape of the Waitomo District area has been the centre of increasingly popular commercial caving tourism since before 1900, initially mostly consisting of impromptu trips guided by local Māori. The Waitomo Glowworm Cave near Waitomo Caves was nationalised by the Crown in 1904 and managed as a tourism attraction from 1905 onwards. At this time tourists would set out for the Waitomo Glowworm Cave from Otorohanga or Hangatiki railway stations which had been opened in the 1880s. A 1915 guide said, "[The cave] is reached by railway to Hangatiki, thence 6 miles by coach along a good road". There was tourist accommodation at Hangatiki in the early 1900s, and by 1904 accommodation and a store had been built at Waitomo Caves. In 1909 the government built a hotel, and the village gradually developed to support increasing tourism to the caves in the area.

The Waitomo Caves Museum provides information about the karst landscape, caves and caving and the history of the area.

== Caves ==
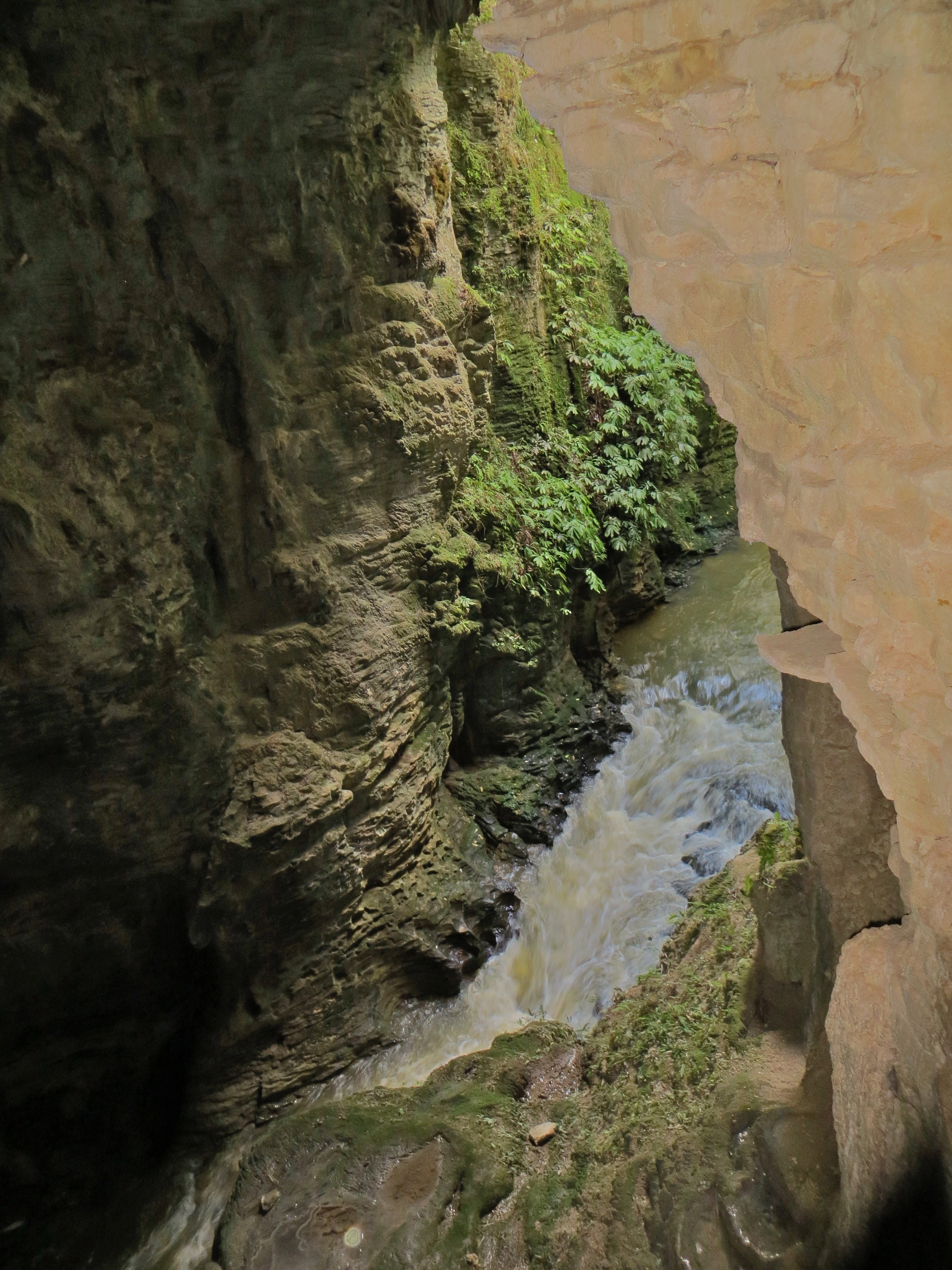
Waitomo Stream flows beneath Ruakuri natural arch.

There are many caves in the Waitomo Caves area, but some are on private land or only accessible to cavers rather than tourists. One example is Gardner's Gut at the Ruakuri Scenic Reserve. This is the largest cave system in the North Island, and it is used by caving clubs for beginner caving experience.

Companies specialise in leading tourists through some of the limestone caves of the area, which are noted for their stalactite and stalagmite displays and for the presence of glowworms (the fungus gnat Arachnocampa luminosa) in caves with streams running through them. Cave tours range from easily accessible areas with hundreds of tourists per hour in the peak season, to activities such as blackwater rafting and crawls into cave systems, which are only seen by a few tourists each day. Tourist caves include:

- Waitomo Glowworm Cave: first explored in 1887, and famous for its Glowworm Grotto, where tourists glide through the dark on a boat under a canopy of glowworms.
- Ruakuri Cave: opened to the public from 1904 until 1988, when it was closed due to a legal and financial dispute. It reopened in 2005. Ruakuri Cave is accessed via a spiral ramp and is wheelchair-accessible. It also has glowworms. Blackwater rafting, abseiling and other adventure activities also take place in Ruakuri Cave.
- Aranui Cave: found by accident in 1910 when Te Ruruku Aranui was out hunting and his dog fell down a hole. Aranui Cave has no stream through it and no glowworms, but it is notable for its delicate stalactites and stalagmites in many colours.
- Mangawhitikau Cave and Spirit Cave (Te Ana o te Atua): a few kilometres south of Waitomo Caves. Both caves were opened to tourists in 1994, but access to Spirit Cave was temporarily lost around 1999 when the land it was on was sold. After negotiations and installation of lighting and paths, Spirit Cave reopened to the public in 2006. Mangawhitikau Cave is noted for its glowworms, while the Spirit Cave has interesting speleothems and fossil moa bones. Spirit Cave was visited in 1849 by military surgeon Arthur Thomson, who wrote a report about the cave and its moa bones in 1854 for the Edinburgh Philosophical Journal.
- Piripiri Cave: a publicly accessible cave that is free to visit, 29 km west of Waitomo Caves in a Department of Conservation Scenic Reserve.

In 2004, around 400,000 visitors entered caves in the area, and a visit to Waitomo Caves made number 14 on a list of 101 "Kiwi must-do's" in a New Zealand Automobile Association poll of over 20,000 motorists published in 2007.

== Walks ==
The Waitomo Walkway runs through the valley of the Waitomo Stream (a tributary of the Waipā River) for 3.3 km (2.1 mi) from the village to the Ruakuri Scenic Reserve. At the reserve the Ruakuri Walk leads through short caves to the Ruakuri Natural Bridge. The Opapaka Pā walk to the east of the village was a short track through native forest and up to the site of a former pā, but it closed due to a large slip.

The Mangapohue Natural Bridge is located 26 km to the west of Waitomo Caves. A short track lets visitors explore the area around the double arch, a remnant of a cave system that has disintegrated.

Te Araroa, a national long distance walkway, passes through Waitomo. The section from Mt Pirongia joins the Waitomo Walkway to enter the village. The 17.5 km (10.9 mi) section to Te Kūiti goes over Mangapu River suspension bridge and through Pehitawa kahikatea forest.

== Demographics ==
Hangatiki statistical area, which includes the settlement of Waitomo, covers 326.46 km^{2} (126.05 sq mi). It had an estimated population of 1,300 as of June 2025, with a population density of 4.0 people per km^{2}.

Historical population for Hangatiki statistical area
Year	Pop.	±% p.a.
2006	1,059	—
2013	1,101	+0.56%
2018	1,185	+1.48%
2023	1,254	+1.14%

Hangatiki had a population of 1,254 in the 2023 New Zealand census, an increase of 69 people (5.8%) since the 2018 census, and an increase of 153 people (13.9%) since the 2013 census. There were 642 males, 609 females, and 3 people of other genders in 477 dwellings. 2.4% of people identified as LGBTIQ+. The median age was 44.4 years (compared with 38.1 years nationally). There were 204 people (16.3%) aged under 15 years, 237 (18.9%) aged 15 to 29, 573 (45.7%) aged 30 to 64, and 240 (19.1%) aged 65 or older.

People could identify as more than one ethnicity. The results were 73.7% European (Pākehā); 37.8% Māori; 1.4% Pasifika; 2.6% Asian; 0.7% Middle Eastern, Latin American and African New Zealanders (MELAA); and 3.8% other, which includes people giving their ethnicity as "New Zealander". English was spoken by 96.9%, Māori by 10.3%, Samoan by 0.2%, and other languages by 4.3%. No language could be spoken by 1.9% (e.g. too young to talk). New Zealand Sign Language was known by 0.5%. The percentage of people born overseas was 11.7, compared with 28.8% nationally.

Religious affiliations were 28.5% Christian, 0.2% Islam, 3.6% Māori religious beliefs, 0.5% New Age, and 0.5% other religions. People who answered that they had no religion were 59.6%, and 6.9% of people did not answer the census question.

Of those at least 15 years old, 174 (16.6%) people had a bachelor's or higher degree, 603 (57.4%) had a post-high school certificate or diploma, and 285 (27.1%) people exclusively held high school qualifications. The median income was $39,900, compared with $41,500 nationally. 81 people (7.7%) earned over $100,000 compared to 12.1% nationally. The employment status of those at least 15 was 558 (53.1%) full-time, 144 (13.7%) part-time, and 21 (2.0%) unemployed.

== Marae ==
The community has a number of marae, affiliated with Ngāti Maniapoto hapū:

- Kaputuhi Marae is affiliated with the hapū of Ngāti Matakore, Pare te Kawa, Ngāti Peehi and Rōrā.
- Te Kauae Marae and Te Kauae o Niu Tereni meeting house are affiliated with the hapū of Huiao, Ngāti Kinohaku, Ngāti Peehi and Ngāti Te Kanawa.
- Te Korapatu Marae is affiliated with the hapū of Peehi and Te Kanawa.
- Pohatuiri Marae is affiliated with the hapū of Uekaha.
- Tokikapu Marae and Matua a Iwi meeting house are affiliated with the hapū of Ruapuha, Te Kanawa and Uekaha.

== Education ==
Waitomo Caves School is a co-educational state primary school, with a roll of 31 as of July 2026. It opened in 1910.

== See also ==
- List of caves in New Zealand
- Waitomo Glowworm Cave
