= Outline of New Zealand =

Island country in the southwestern Pacific Ocean

The flag of New Zealand

The Arms of His Majesty in Right of New Zealand

The location of New Zealand on a globe

The following outline is provided as an overview of and topical guide to New Zealand:

New Zealand is an island country located in the western South Pacific Ocean comprising two large islands, the North Island and the South Island, and numerous smaller islands, most notably Stewart Island / Rakiura and the Chatham Islands. The indigenous Māori originally called the North Island Aotearoa, commonly translated into English as "The Land of the Long White Cloud"; Aotearoa is now used as the Māori language name for the entire country.

New Zealand is situated about 2,000 km (1,200 mi) southeast of Australia across the Tasman Sea, its closest neighbours to the north being New Caledonia, Fiji and Tonga. Because of its remoteness, it was one of the last lands to be settled by humans. During its long period of isolation, New Zealand developed a distinct biodiversity of animal, fungal and plant life. The country's varied topography and its sharp mountain peaks, such as the Southern Alps, owe much to the tectonic uplift of land and volcanic eruptions. New Zealand's capital city is Wellington, while its most populous city is Auckland.

The population is mostly of European descent, with the indigenous Māori being the largest minority. Asians and non-Māori Pasifika peoples are also significant minorities, especially in the cities. Charles III, as the king of New Zealand, is the head of state and, in his absence, is represented by a non-partisan governor-general. Political power is held by the democratically elected New Zealand Parliament under the leadership of the prime minister, who is the head of government. The Realm of New Zealand also includes the Cook Islands and Niue, which are self-governing but in free association; Tokelau; and the Ross Dependency (New Zealand's territorial claim in Antarctica).

== General reference ==
- Pronunciation: /njuːˈziːlənd/
- Official English country name: New Zealand
- Official Māori country name: Aotearoa
- Endonym: New Zealand
- Adjectival: New Zealand
- Demonym: New Zealander, "Kiwi"
- Etymology: Name of New Zealand
- International rankings of New Zealand
- ISO country codes: NZ, NZL, 554
- ISO region codes: See ISO 3166-2:NZ
- Internet country code top-level domain: .nz

== Geography of New Zealand ==
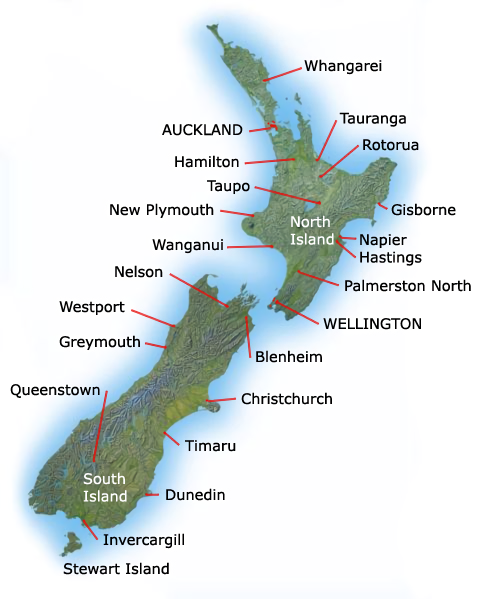
An enlargeable topographic map of New Zealand

Geography of New Zealand

- New Zealand is...
  - a group of islands
  - a country
    - an island country
    - a Commonwealth realm
- Location:
  - Southern Hemisphere and Eastern Hemisphere
    - Pacific Ocean
      - South Pacific Ocean
        - Oceania
          - Polynesia
          - Australasia
  - Time in New Zealand:
    - Chatham Islands – Chatham Standard Time (UTC+12:45), Chatham Daylight Time (UTC+13:45)
    - Rest of New Zealand – New Zealand Standard Time (UTC+12), New Zealand Daylight Time (UTC+13) September–April
  - Extreme points of New Zealand
    - North: Nugent Island, Kermadec Islands
    - South: Jacquemart Island, Campbell Islands
    - East: Kahuitara Point, Pitt Island, Chatham Islands
    - West: Cape Lovitt, Auckland Island
    - High: Aoraki / Mount Cook 3,754 m (12,316 ft)
    - Low: 45°55'02"S 170°10'58"E; near Momona, Taieri Plain, Otago −2 m
  - Land boundaries: none
  - Coastline: South Pacific Ocean 15,134 km (10th)
- Population of New Zealand: 5,223,100 (estimated June 2023) – 120th most populous country
- Area of New Zealand: 268,680 km^{2}
- Atlas of New Zealand
- Surveying in New Zealand

=== Environment of New Zealand ===
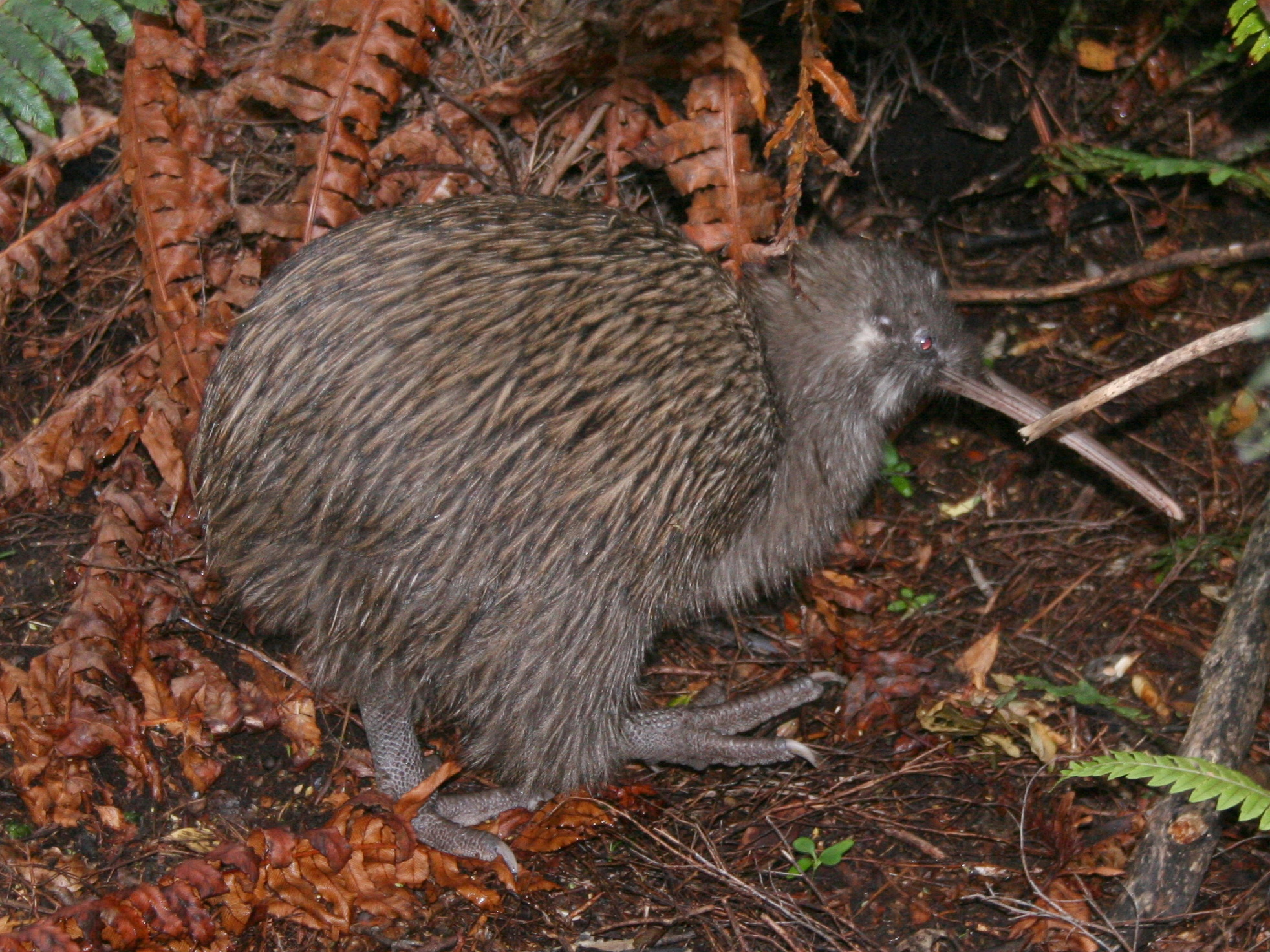
Southern brown kiwi (tokoeka)

Environment of New Zealand

- Biodiversity of New Zealand
  - Flora of New Zealand
  - Fauna of New Zealand
    - Birds of New Zealand
    - Mammals of New Zealand
- Climate of New Zealand
- Climate change in New Zealand
- Ecoregions in New Zealand
- Environmental issues in New Zealand
- Geology of New Zealand
  - List of earthquakes in New Zealand
  - Natural history of New Zealand
  - Stratigraphy of New Zealand
  - Volcanism of New Zealand
- Pollution in New Zealand
- Protected areas of New Zealand
  - Marine reserves of New Zealand
  - National parks of New Zealand
- Renewable energy in New Zealand

==== Natural geographic features of New Zealand ====
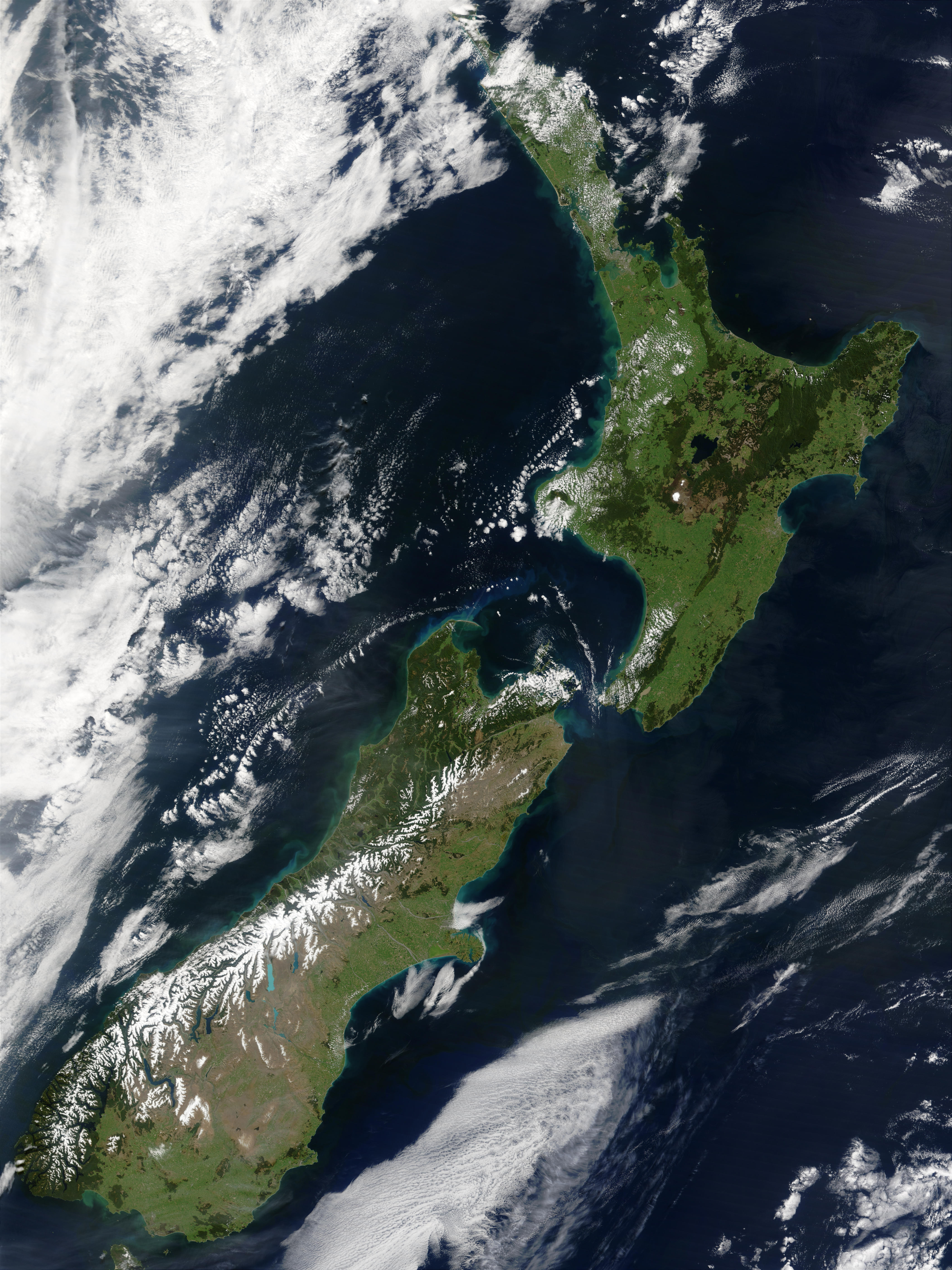
Satellite image of New Zealand

- Caves of New Zealand
- Fjords of New Zealand
- Glaciers of New Zealand
- Islands of New Zealand
- Lakes of New Zealand
- Mountains of New Zealand
  - Volcanoes in New Zealand
- Rivers of New Zealand
  - Waterfalls of New Zealand
- List of rock formations of New Zealand
- World Heritage Sites in New Zealand

=== Political geography of New Zealand ===
==== Administrative divisions of New Zealand ====
Administrative divisions of New Zealand

- Regions of New Zealand
- Territorial authorities of New Zealand
  - Districts of New Zealand
  - Cities of New Zealand

=== Demography of New Zealand ===
Demographics of New Zealand

== Government and politics of New Zealand ==
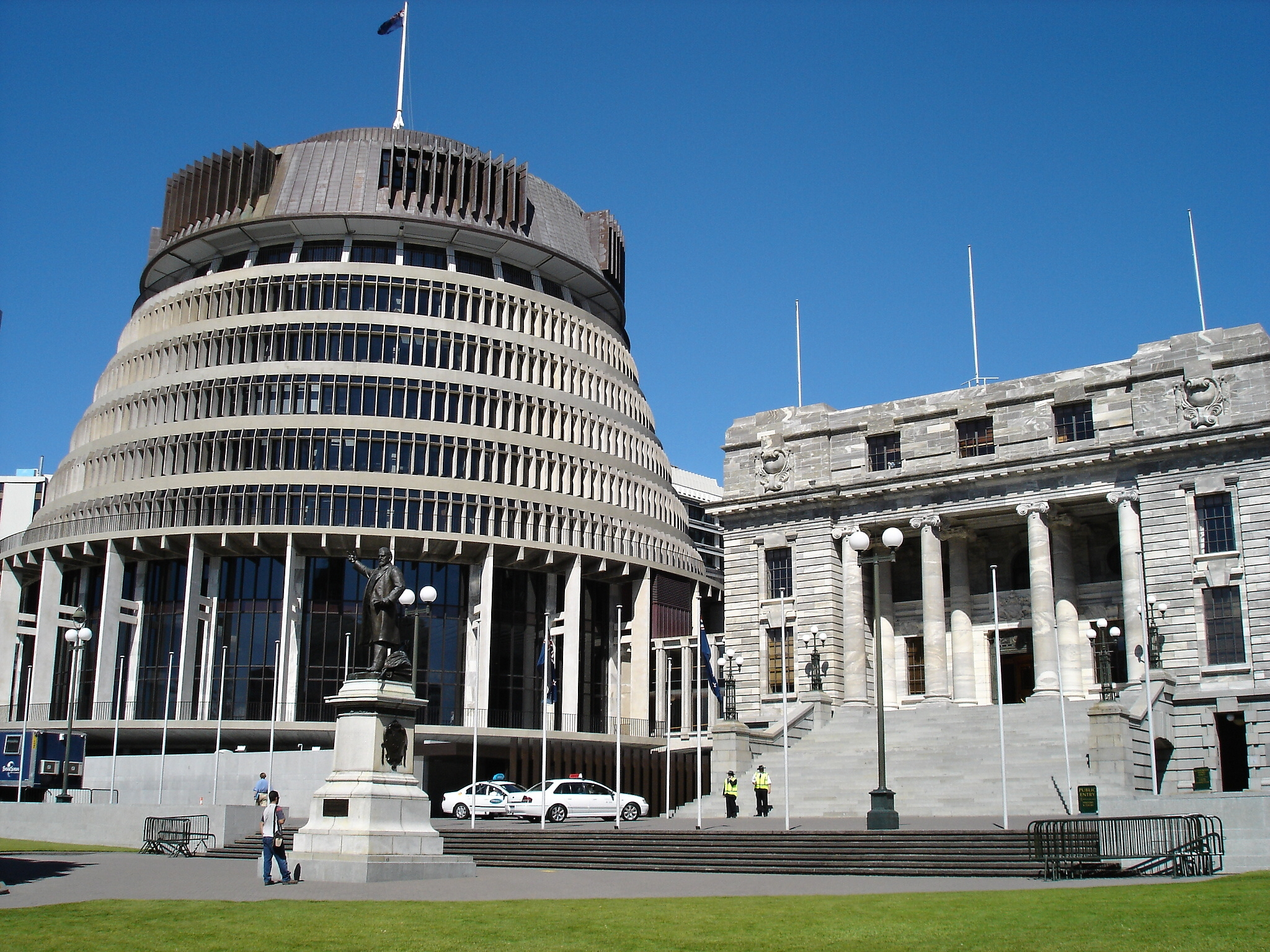
The Beehive and Parliament House, Wellington

Politics of New Zealand

- Capital of New Zealand: Wellington
- Form of government:
  - Liberal democracy
  - Parliamentary system
- Elections in New Zealand
  - Electoral system of New Zealand
  - History of voting in New Zealand
- Political parties in New Zealand
- Taxation in New Zealand
- Types
  - Anarchism
  - Christian
  - Conservatism
  - Fascism
  - Feminism in New Zealand
  - Māori
  - Liberalism
  - Populism
  - Republicanism
  - Socialism
- Issues
  - Abortion
  - Capital punishment
  - Electoral reform
  - Flag debate
  - Gun law
  - Nuclear-free zone
  - Prostitution
  - Same-sex marriage
  - Treaty of Waitangi claims and settlements
- Policies
  - Think Big
  - Rogernomics
  - Ruthanasia
  - Working for Families
- Principles of the Treaty of Waitangi

=== Branches of the government of New Zealand ===
==== Executive branch of the government of New Zealand ====
- New Zealand Government
  - Head of state: King of New Zealand, Charles III
    - Governor-General of New Zealand, Dame Cindy Kiro
  - Head of government: Prime Minister of New Zealand, Christopher Luxon
  - Ministers in the New Zealand Government
    - Cabinet of New Zealand

==== Legislative branch of the government of New Zealand ====
- New Zealand Parliament (unicameral)
  - New Zealand House of Representatives

==== Judicial branch of the government of New Zealand ====
- Judiciary of New Zealand
  - Supreme Court of New Zealand
- Judicial review in New Zealand

=== Foreign relations of New Zealand ===
Foreign relations of New Zealand

- Diplomatic missions in New Zealand
- Diplomatic missions of New Zealand
- Australia–New Zealand relations
- New Zealand–United Kingdom relations

=== International organisation membership ===
New Zealand is a member of:

- Asian Development Bank (ADB)
- Asia-Pacific Economic Cooperation (APEC)
- Association of Southeast Asian Nations (ASEAN) (dialogue partner)
- Association of Southeast Asian Nations Regional Forum (ARF)
- Australia Group
- Australia-New Zealand-United States Security Treaty (ANZUS)
- Bank for International Settlements (BIS)
- Colombo Plan (CP)
- Commonwealth of Nations
- East Asia Summit (EAS)
- European Bank for Reconstruction and Development (EBRD)
- Food and Agriculture Organization (FAO)
- International Atomic Energy Agency (IAEA)
- International Bank for Reconstruction and Development (IBRD)
- International Chamber of Commerce (ICC)
- International Civil Aviation Organization (ICAO)
- International Criminal Court (ICCt)
- International Criminal Police Organization (Interpol)
- International Development Association (IDA)
- International Energy Agency (IEA)
- International Federation of Red Cross and Red Crescent Societies (IFRCS)
- International Finance Corporation (IFC)
- International Fund for Agricultural Development (IFAD)
- International Hydrographic Organization (IHO)
- International Labour Organization (ILO)
- International Maritime Organization (IMO)
- International Mobile Satellite Organization (IMSO)
- International Monetary Fund (IMF)
- International Olympic Committee (IOC)
- International Organization for Migration (IOM)
- International Organization for Standardization (ISO)
- International Red Cross and Red Crescent Movement (ICRM)
- International Telecommunication Union (ITU)
- International Telecommunications Satellite Organization (ITSO)
- International Trade Union Confederation (ITUC)
- Inter-Parliamentary Union (IPU)
- Nonaligned Movement (NAM) (guest)
- Nuclear Suppliers Group (NSG)
- Organisation for Economic Co-operation and Development (OECD)
- Organisation for the Prohibition of Chemical Weapons (OPCW)
- Pacific Islands Forum (PIF)
- The Pacific Community (SPC)
- Permanent Court of Arbitration (PCA)
- South Pacific Regional Trade and Economic Cooperation Agreement (Sparteca)
- United Nations (UN)
- United Nations Conference on Trade and Development (UNCTAD)
- United Nations Educational, Scientific, and Cultural Organization (UNESCO)
- United Nations High Commissioner for Refugees (UNHCR)
- United Nations Industrial Development Organization (UNIDO)
- United Nations Integrated Mission in Timor-Leste (UNMIT)
- United Nations Mission in the Sudan (UNMIS)
- United Nations Truce Supervision Organization (UNTSO)
- Universal Postal Union (UPU)
- World Customs Organization (WCO)
- World Federation of Trade Unions (WFTU)
- World Health Organization (WHO)
- World Intellectual Property Organization (WIPO)
- World Meteorological Organization (WMO)
- World Trade Organization (WTO)

=== Law and order in New Zealand ===
Law of New Zealand

- Cannabis in New Zealand
- Capital punishment in New Zealand
- Constitution of New Zealand
- Crime in New Zealand
- Human rights in New Zealand
  - Disability rights in New Zealand
  - LGBT rights in New Zealand
- Law enforcement in New Zealand
- Terrorism in New Zealand

=== Military of New Zealand ===
New Zealand Defence Force

- Ministry of Defence of New Zealand
- Forces
  - Army of New Zealand
  - Navy of New Zealand
  - Air Force of New Zealand
  - Special Forces of New Zealand
- Military history of New Zealand
- Military ranks of New Zealand

=== Local government in New Zealand ===
Local government in New Zealand

== History of New Zealand ==
History of New Zealand

- Archaeology of New Zealand
- Independence of New Zealand
- Military history of New Zealand
- Political history of New Zealand
  - Treaty of Waitangi
  - Waihi miners' strike
  - 1951 waterfront dispute
  - 1981 Springbok Tour
  - Rogernomics
  - Ruthanasia
  - 1993 electoral referendum
  - Political scandals in New Zealand
    - Corngate
    - Foreshore and seabed controversy
    - Orewa speech
    - Tea tape scandal
- Timeline of New Zealand history

== Culture of New Zealand ==
Culture of New Zealand

- Architecture of New Zealand
- Cuisine of New Zealand
- Housing in New Zealand
- Languages of New Zealand
  - New Zealand English
  - Māori language
  - New Zealand Sign Language
- Māori culture
- Media in New Zealand
- Museums in New Zealand
- People of New Zealand
- Prostitution in New Zealand
- National symbols of New Zealand
  - Coat of arms of New Zealand
  - Flag of New Zealand
  - National anthems of New Zealand
- Public holidays in New Zealand
- Religion in New Zealand
  - Christianity in New Zealand
  - Hinduism in New Zealand
  - Islam in New Zealand
  - Judaism in New Zealand
  - Sikhism in New Zealand
- World Heritage Sites in New Zealand

=== Art in New Zealand ===
- Art of New Zealand
- Cinema of New Zealand
- Literature of New Zealand
- Music of New Zealand
- Television in New Zealand
- Theatre in New Zealand
- Kapa haka

=== Sports in New Zealand ===
Sports in New Zealand

- Rugby union in New Zealand (national sport)
- Rugby league in New Zealand
- Football in New Zealand
- Horse racing in New Zealand
- New Zealand at the Olympics
- Stadiums in New Zealand
- Horse tracks in New Zealand

== Economy and infrastructure of New Zealand ==
Economy of New Zealand

- Agriculture in New Zealand
- Banks in New Zealand
  - Reserve Bank of New Zealand
- Communications in New Zealand
  - Internet in New Zealand
  - Telecommunications in New Zealand
- Companies of New Zealand
- Currency of New Zealand: Dollar
  - ISO 4217: NZD
- Energy in New Zealand
  - New Zealand Emissions Trading Scheme
  - Oil and gas industry in New Zealand
- Health care in New Zealand
  - Hospitals in New Zealand
  - Mental health in New Zealand
- Mining in New Zealand
- New Zealand Stock Exchange
- Tourism in New Zealand
- Transport in New Zealand
  - Airports in New Zealand
  - Rail transport in New Zealand
  - Roads in New Zealand
- Water supply and sanitation in New Zealand

== Education in New Zealand ==
- Education in New Zealand
- Secondary education in New Zealand
- Tertiary education in New Zealand

== See also ==
- List of articles about Australia and New Zealand jointly
- List of international rankings
- List of New Zealand-related topics
- Member state of the Commonwealth of Nations
- Member state of the United Nations
- Monarchy of New Zealand
- Outline of geography
- Outline of Oceania
