= Housing in New Zealand =

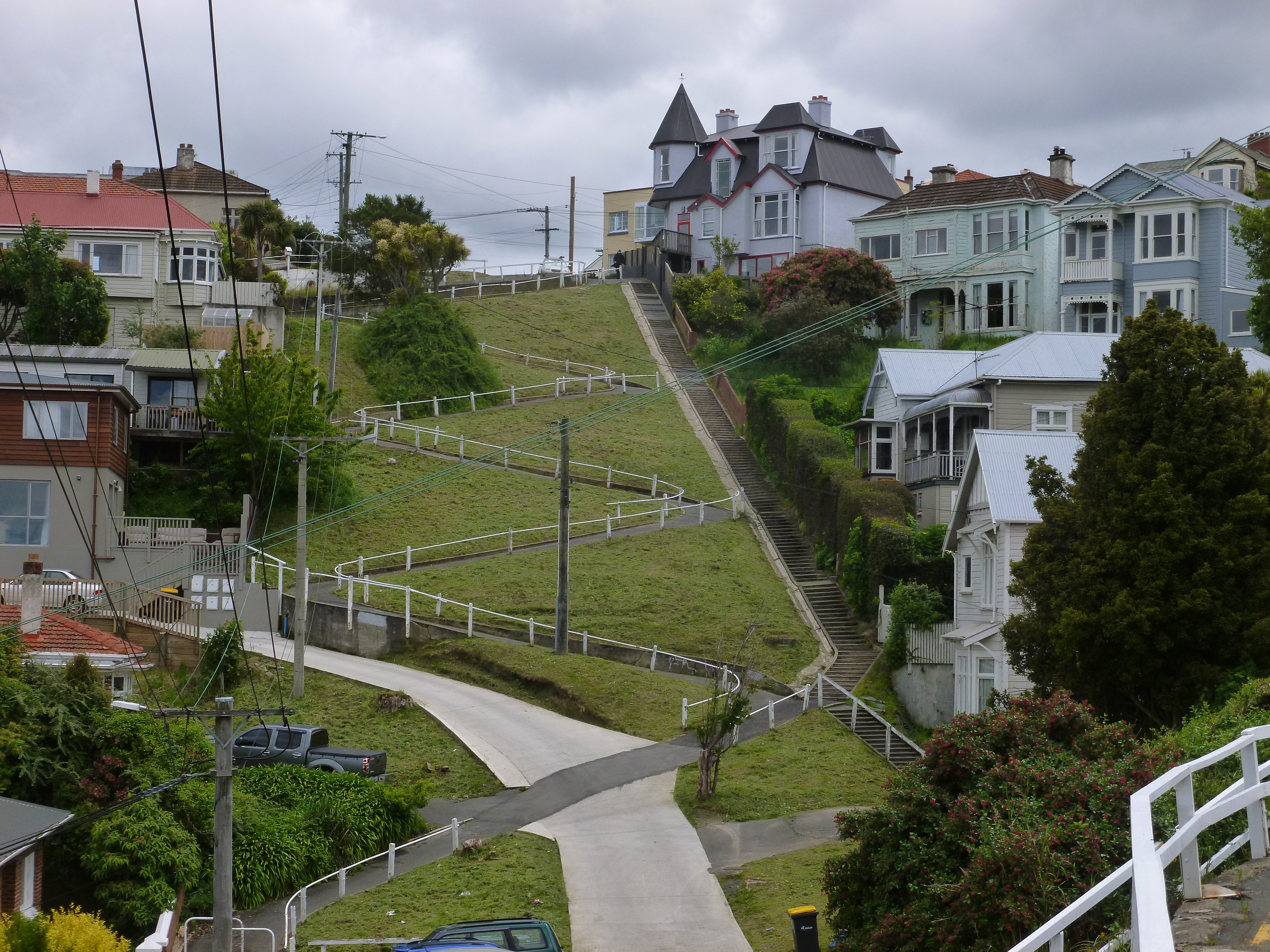
Suburban housing in Dunedin

Housing in New Zealand was traditionally based on the quarter-acre block, detached suburban home, but many historical exceptions and alternative modern trends exist. New Zealand has largely followed international designs. From the time of organised European colonisation in the mid-19th century there has been a general chronological development in the types of homes built in New Zealand, and examples of each generation are still commonly occupied.

== Types of dwellings ==
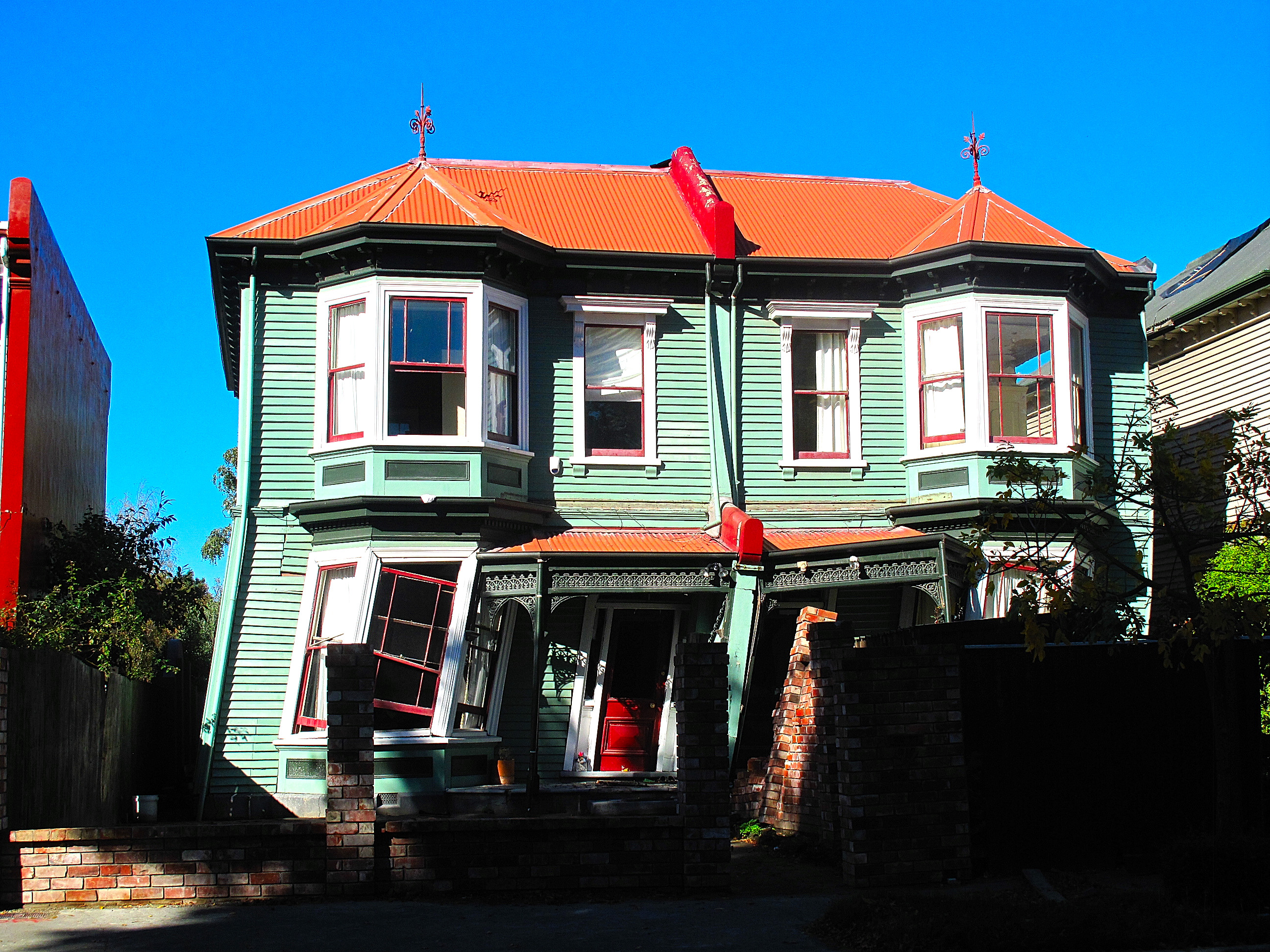
Semi-detached houses after an earthquake, Christchurch

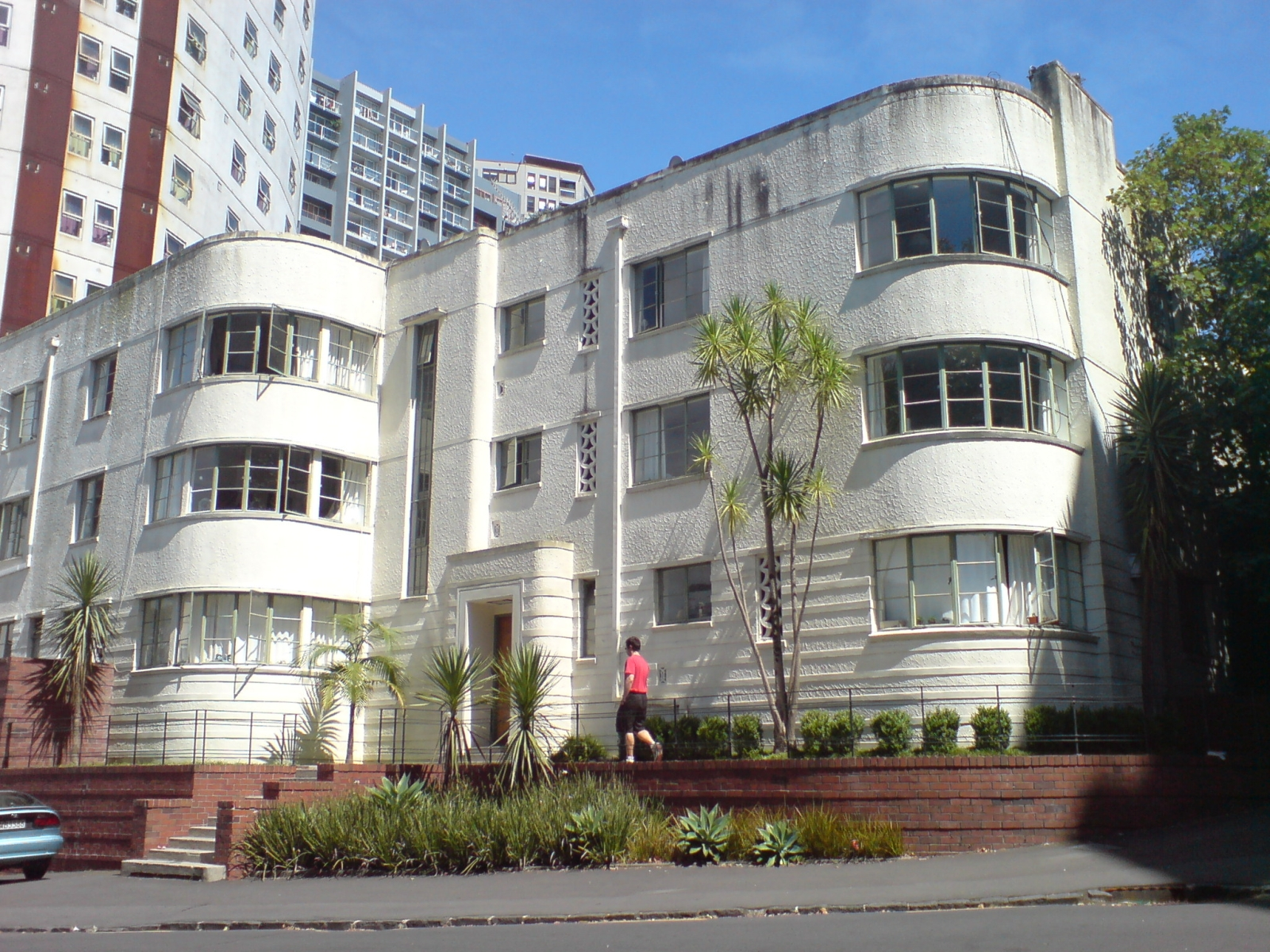
Art-deco apartments, Symonds Street, Auckland

Traditionally, residential sections were quarter acre (roughly 1000 m²), but typical section sizes have been getting much smaller since the mid-1900s. After a series of controversies over slum-like housing conditions of the urban poor, from 1936 the then Labour government developed state housing – suburban housing built by the government and rented to poorer families. This housing stock was generally very well built and remains a feature in most cities, although the homes are now often privately owned. In 2021, about 86% of New Zealand residents lived in urban areas. These are becoming more dense but remain very sparsely settled by international standards. Many old office blocks and church buildings have been converted to apartments in New Zealand's major centres.

=== Holiday and mobile homes ===
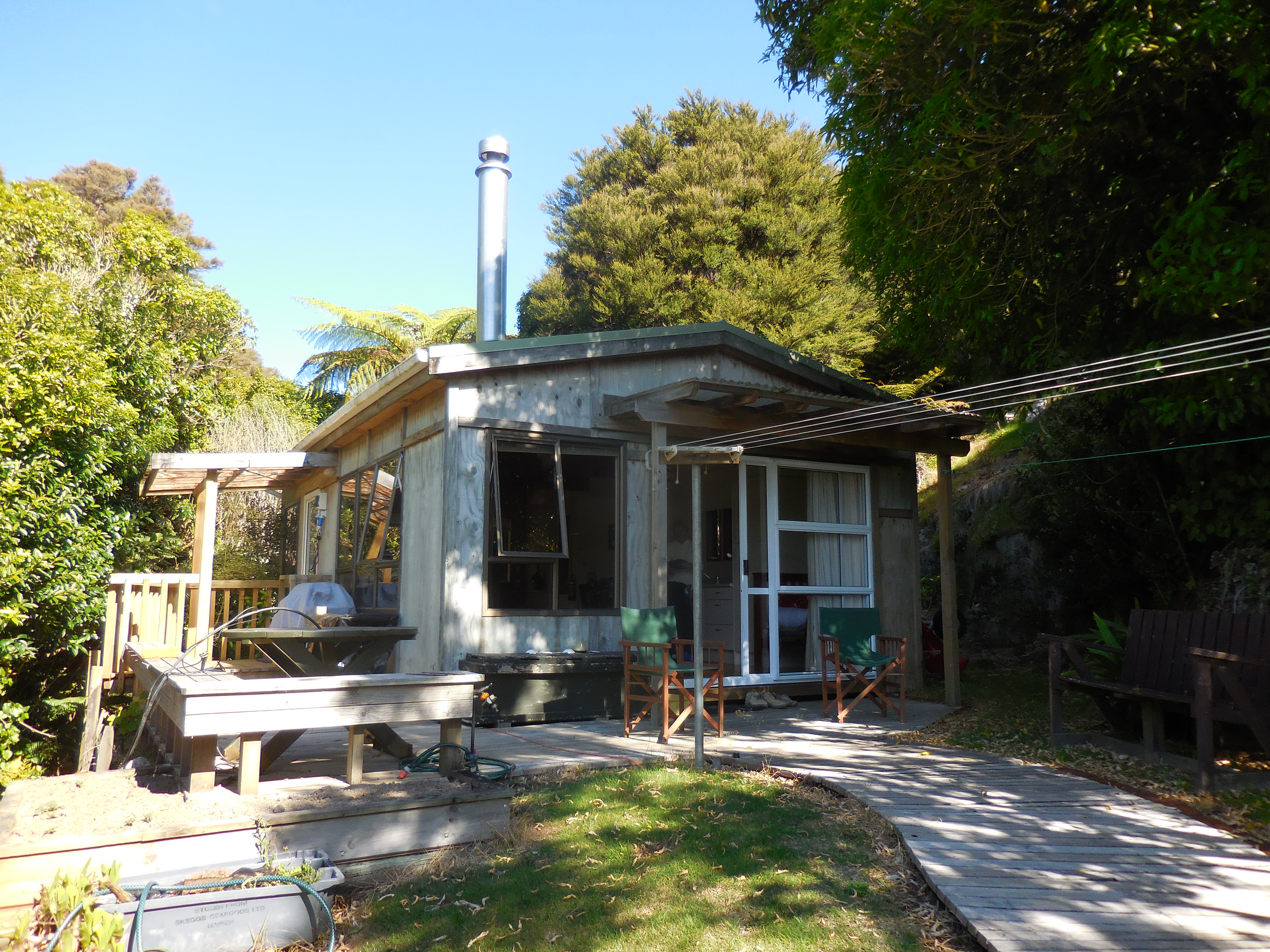
A bach (holiday home) in the Tasman District, South Island

Small, often very modest holiday homes or beach houses, called "baches" (pronounced "batches") in most of the country, but "cribs" in the south of the South Island, are used by tourists on a temporary basis as holiday accommodation. These are typically purpose-built houses or huts near a coast or a lake. They may also serve as a base for hunting or fishing in local rivers. They have a reputation for rustic, minimalist and mismatched internal design and furniture. However, large expensive holiday homes are also (though less commonly) called baches.

Tents, campervans and caravans are also common, but New Zealand lacks the large trailer parks of some similar countries, like Australia and South Africa.

A movement to build tiny homes has emerged.

New Zealand also has a large set of wilderness huts, but staying in them for more than three days at a time is discouraged.

=== Homelessness ===
Many New Zealanders live permanently in structures which were not designed as homes; the government classifies these people as homeless. Difficulties exist in measuring homelessness statistically, and New Zealand does not typically record the phenomenon with the same accuracy as other statistics. The 2013 census produced an estimate that 1% of people in New Zealand live in "severe housing deprivation" – an increase from previous years. In May 2018 the government allocated $100 million to address homelessness over the following four years.

== House design ==
When records began in 1974, new homes in New Zealand had an average floor area of 120 m^{2} (1,290 sq ft). Average new home sizes rose to peak at 200 m^{2} (2,150 sq ft) in 2010, before falling to 158 m^{2} (1,700 sq ft) in 2019.

In 1966 the Encyclopedia of New Zealand described seven basic types of houses in New Zealand: Arts and Crafts cottage, “L” shape, Californian bungalow, Spanish mission, State House, Moderne and Waterfall Front.

=== 13th to early-19th century ===
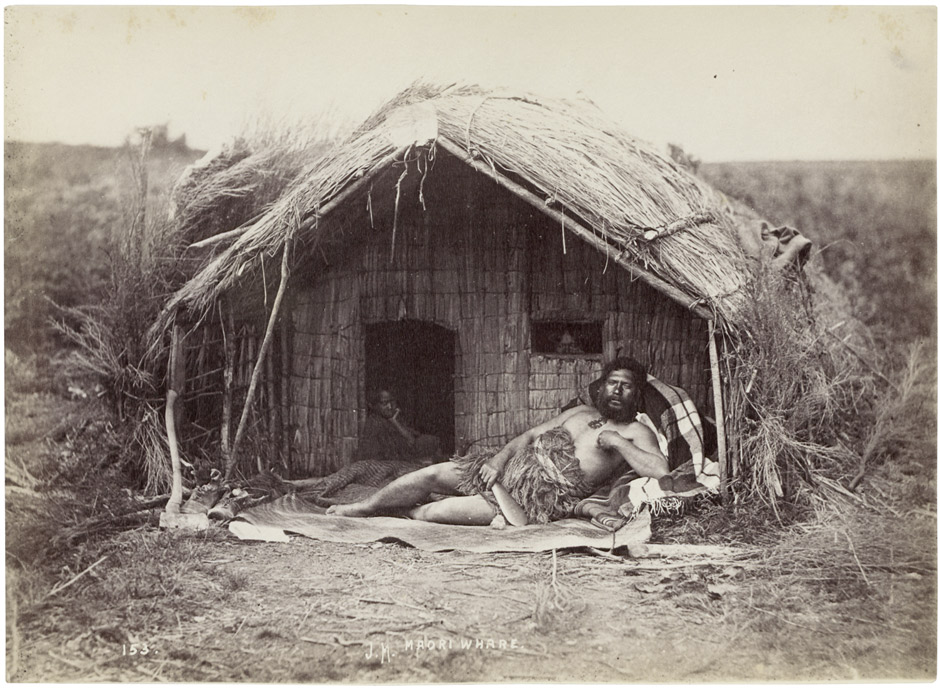
Māori Chief Tahau in whare mid 1870s

At first Māori used the building methods that had been developed in tropical Polynesia, altered to fit a more nomadic lifestyle. By the 15th century Classic Māori communities slept in rectangular sleeping houses (wharepuni). The wharepuni were made of timber, rushes, tree ferns and bark, with thatched roofs and earth floors. These buildings also had a front porch which was an adaptation to New Zealand's climate and not found in tropical Polynesia. The influence of European housing methods from the early 1900s led to a mix of designs with Māori adopting windows and higher roofs.

=== 19th century ===
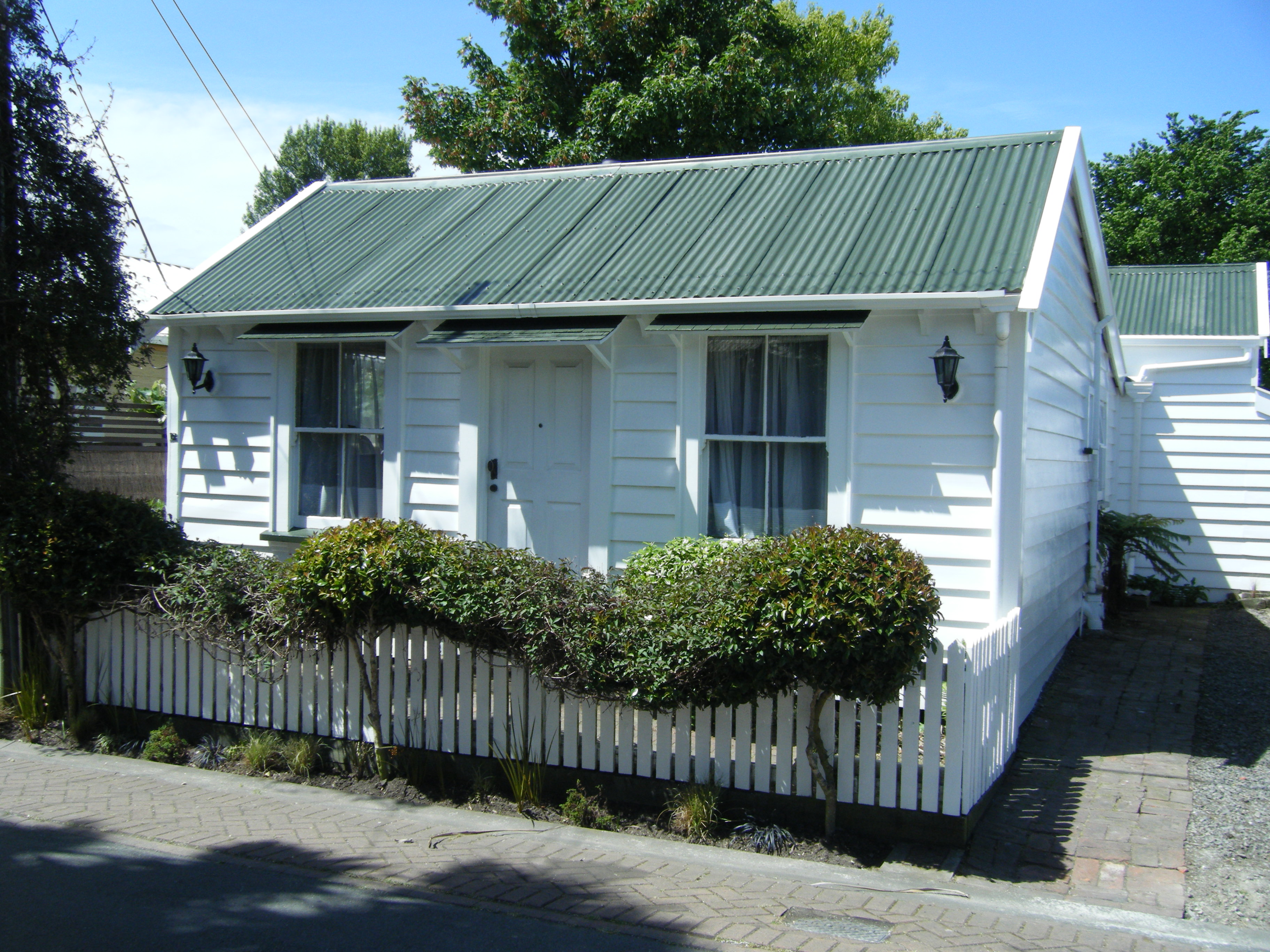
Cottage, Sydenham, Christchurch

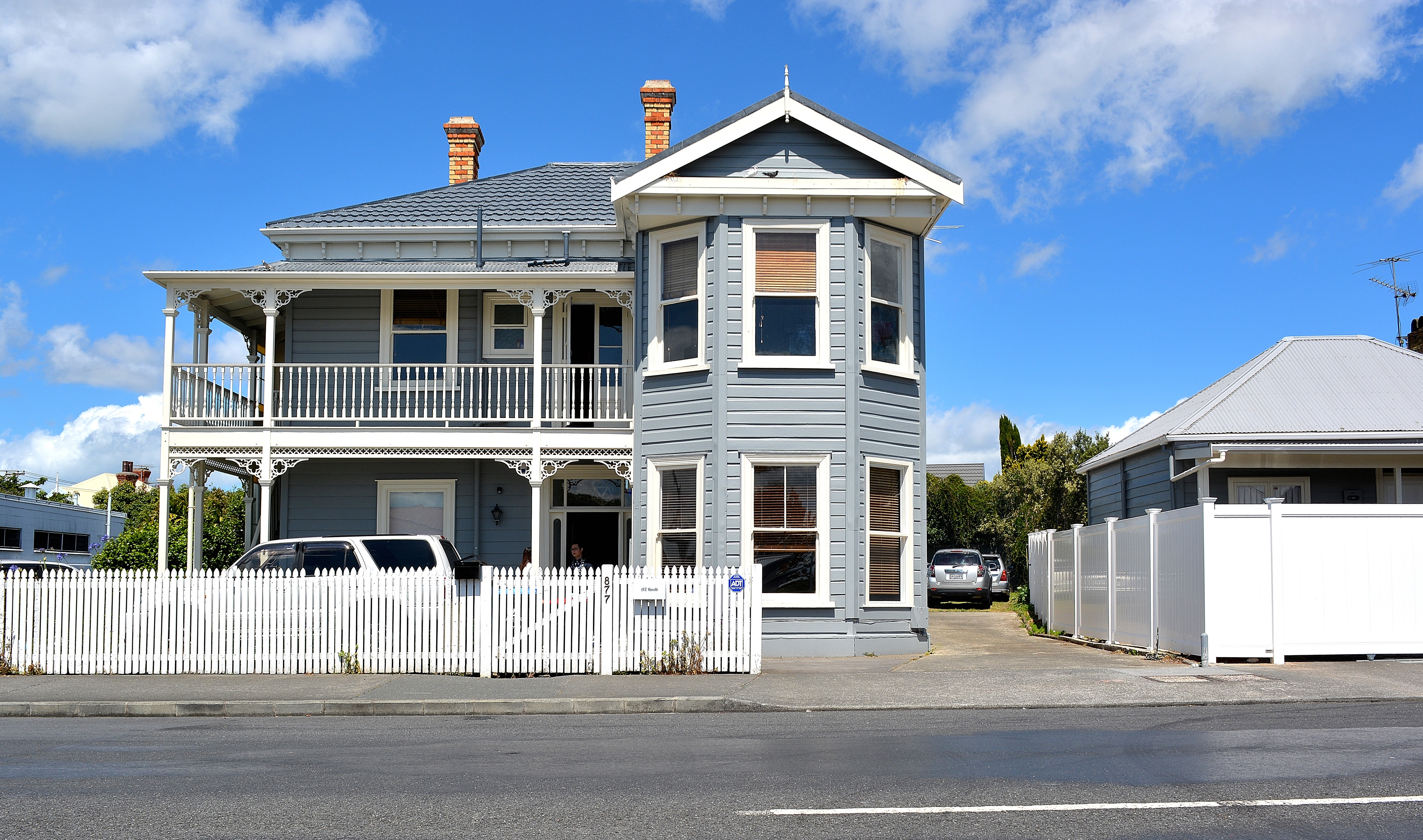
Villa, Royal Oak, Auckland

Houses from this period are divided into cottages and villas. The first houses built in New Zealand were cottages. Villas were the larger and more expensively built equivalent. A typical villa has the kitchen to the rear of the house and separate from the dining room, as food preparation was meant to occur out of sight. Villas were the main form of housing in residential areas from after 1840 up to World War I.

=== Early 20th century ===
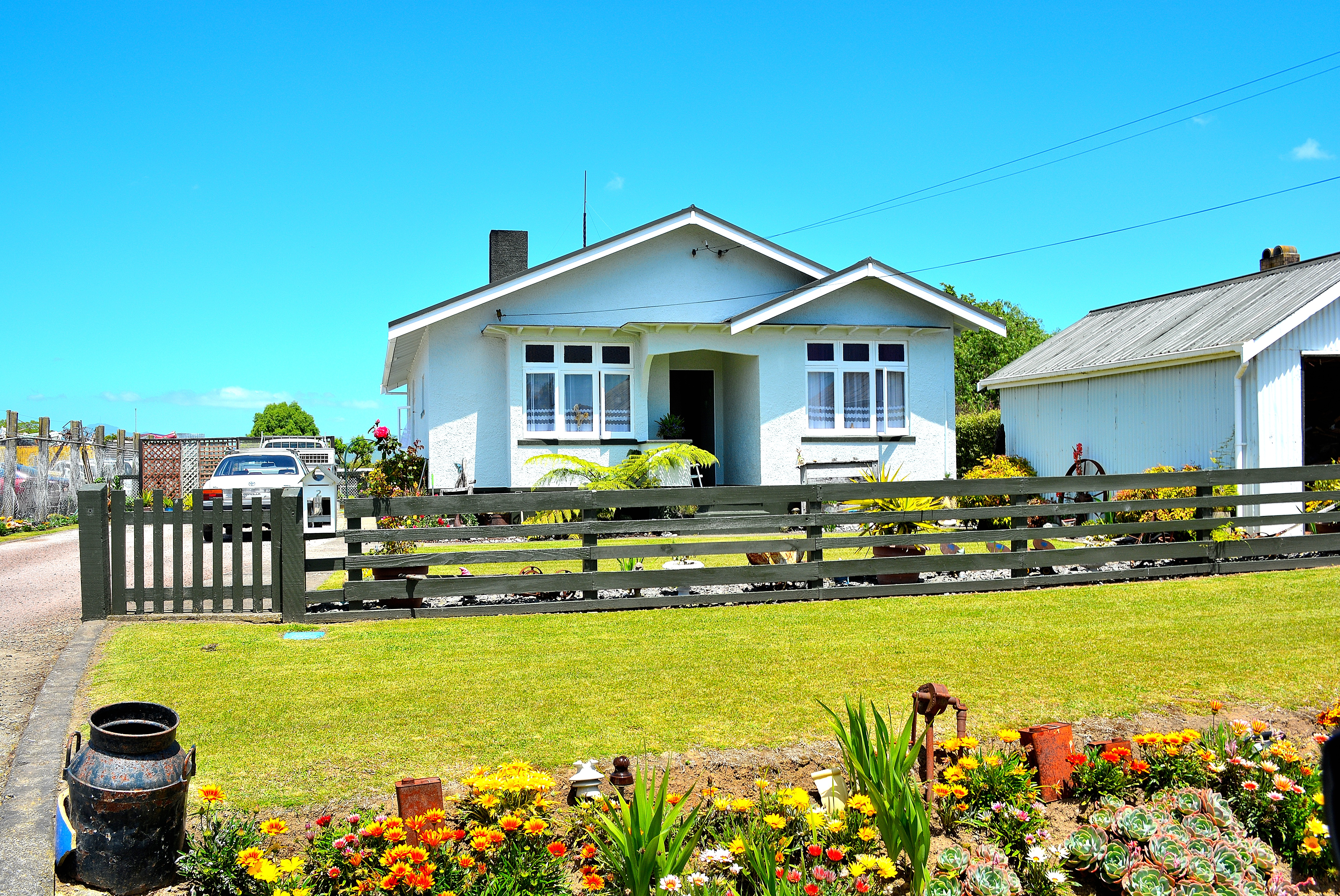
California Bungalow, Paeroa

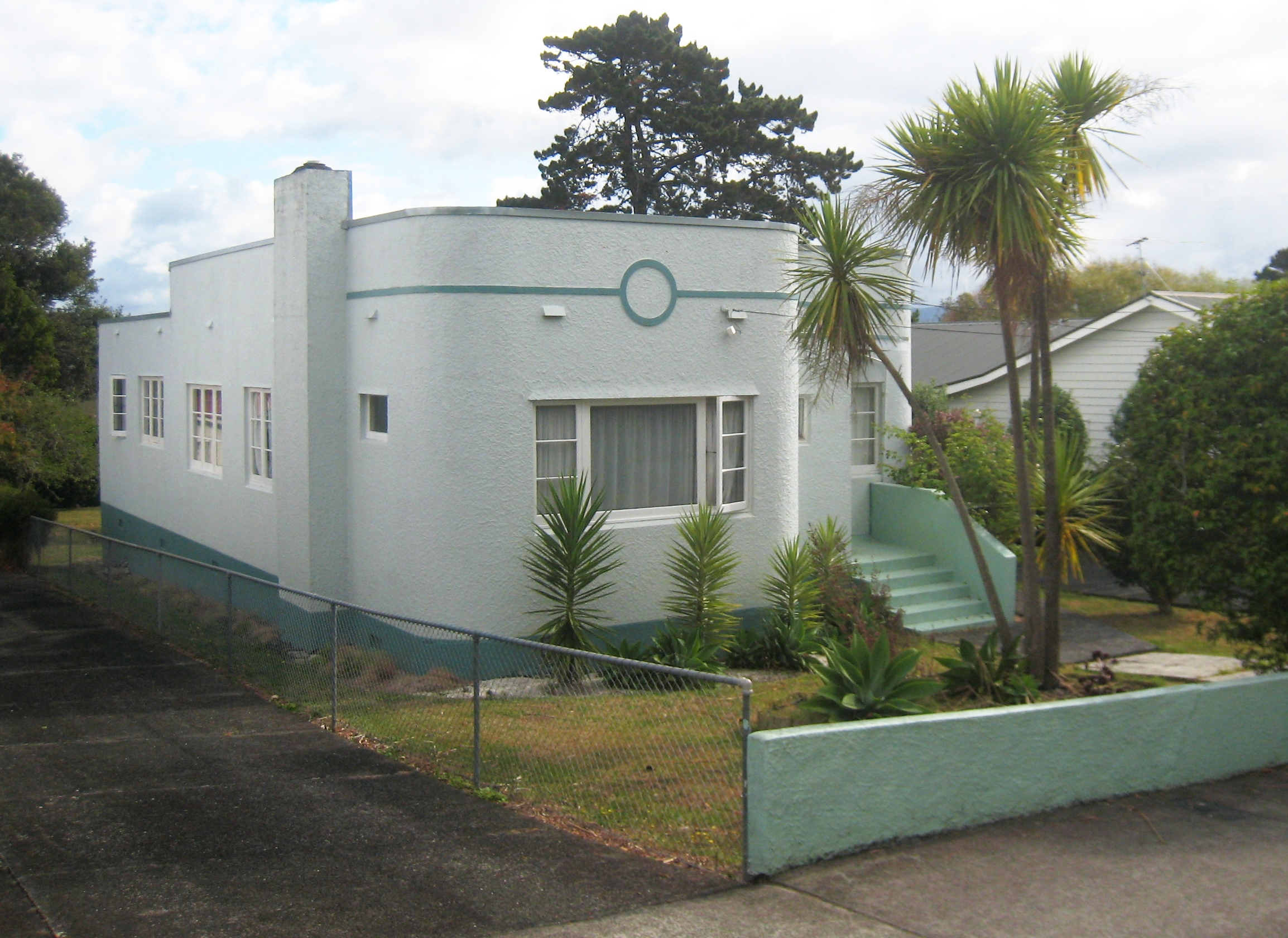
Art Deco house, Waterview, Auckland

The 20th century started with big Edwardian houses and neo-Georgian architecture. From the late 1910s the Californian bungalow became more popular. The design had a lower pitched roof and ceiling height than the typical New Zealand villa and was therefore easier to heat. This coincided with the popularity of the Hollywood film industry, which incorporated American clothes, furniture, cars and houses.

As a response to American influence and nostalgia for Britain, a style of houses was built which conspicuously emulated older English styles. Spanish mission style from the late 1920s with grand triple arches and twisted Baroque columns. Modernism (Art deco) of the 1930s was designed to be functional with smooth surfaces and a flat roof.

The 1931 Hawke's Bay earthquake showed an absence or low level of earthquake resilience in buildings. Subsequently, earthquake standards for buildings were introduced in 1935.

=== Late 20th century ===
State housing had a big influence on the way homes were built in New Zealand from the 1940s to the late 1960s.

The 1970s saw several changes to housing construction. New Zealand's metrication between 1969 and 1976 saw construction move from imperial to metric units. Imperial units still remain in colloquial use; for example, 90 mm × 45 mm (3.5 in × 1.8 in) dimensional timber is still referred to as 'four-by-two'. In 1978, two key building standards were introduced: NZS 3604, specifying design and construction requirements for light timber-framed buildings, and NZS 4218, specifying minimum thermal insulation requirements for houses.

=== 21st century ===
In the early 21st century New Zealanders built in a variety of styles that borrowed from previous influences.

==== Integration with the environment ====
In some conspicuous locations in area of natural beauty it is required by local councils to blend the house design with the surrounding environment.

==== Passive climate control ====
Houses can be built to maximise the heat gained during the day from the sun and retain it overnight.

==== Natural building material revival ====
With increased affluence and environmental concerns a small but growing number of houses are built with semi-processed natural materials and traditional building methods.

== Utilities ==
=== Heating and insulation ===
Insulation in ceilings, walls and floor became mandatory for new builds and additions in 1978. Glass fibre, polyester, polystyrene, wool and paper are all used for insulation in New Zealand. Home insulation in New Zealand can be heavily subsidised by the government.

According to the 2018 New Zealand census, heat pumps were the most common form of space heating, with 47.3% of households using them as their primary heating appliance. Other common forms of space heating were electric resistance heaters (44.1%) and wood burners (32.3%).

Some local councils are restricting the kind of wood and coal burners that can be used in order to improve air quality.

=== Water and sewerage ===
In 2017 about 80% of New Zealanders were reliant on water purification distribution systems that supplied more than 100 people. Of these 96% met the bacteriological standards for water quality, while 81% met all the relevant standards. The remaining 20% of New Zealanders typically live in rural areas where rain, streams and bores are commonly used as water sources.

Large properties can process or store their sewage on site. Grey water can be reused for purposes other than drinking. This recycling is required by some New Zealand councils.

== Construction and regulations ==
The Building Act 1991 was replaced by the Building Act 2004. This introduced licensing for building designers, builders and related trades. Councils were required to be subject to regular quality control procedure checks, but council building inspectors remained unlicensed.

The Building Code sets out the minimum performance standards that buildings must be designed and constructed to meet, but itself does not prescribe methods or solutions to meet the Code. Acceptable solutions and verification methods specify construction and testing methods that assure compliance with the Code. For example, constructing buildings to NZS 3604 Timber-framed buildings or NZS 4229 Concrete masonry buildings not requiring specific engineering design is an acceptable solution to comply with structural provisions of the Code.

=== Alteration regulations ===
Most alterations to homes need to be certificated, and there are special rules for houses of historical importance.

=== Foundations ===
Three broad categories are available for suburban house foundations: concrete slab, concrete block basement foundations and an elevated floor with a crawl space. Footing depth varies with soil type and slope, with either a floating polystyrene slab or more rarely piling.

=== Climate and environmental standards ===
Standards are set out in NZS 3604 Timber-framed buildings and NZS 4218 Thermal insulation - Housing and small buildings regarding a building's resistance to wind, earthquake, snow, corrosion, and climate. The following table shows the respective earthquake, snow and climate zones for cities and selected large towns:

City	Earthquake	Snow	Climate
Whangārei; Auckland	Low (1)	N0	Zone 1
Hamilton; Tauranga; New Plymouth	Low (1)	N0	Zone 2
Rotorua	Medium (2)	N0	Zone 2
Taupō	Medium (2)	N0	Zone 3
Whanganui	Medium (2)	N1	Zone 2
Gisborne; Napier; Hastings; Palmerston North; Wellington	High (3)	N1	Zone 2
Nelson	Medium (2)	N3	Zone 3
Blenheim	High (3)	N3	Zone 3
Greymouth	Medium (2)	N2	Zone 3
Christchurch	Medium (2)	N4	Zone 3
Timaru	Low (1)	N4	Zone 3
Queenstown	High (3)	N5	Zone 3
Dunedin; Invercargill	Low (1)	N5	Zone 3

==== Earthquake risk and construction ====
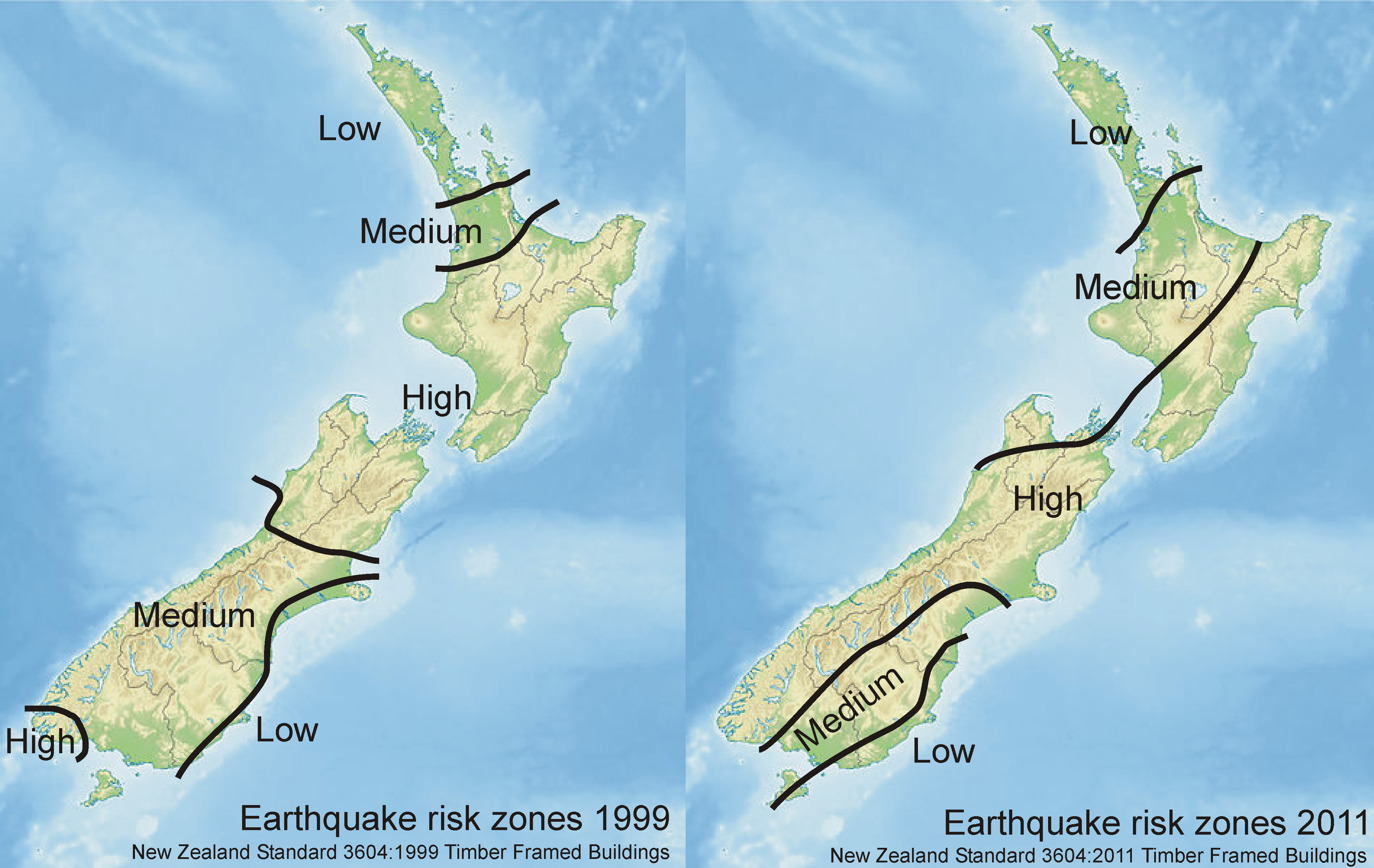
Earthquake risk zones before and after the Christchurch earthquakes

Earthquakes can occur anywhere in New Zealand, but the risk to building structures is highly regional, with the eastern North Island and western South Island having the highest risk. After the 2011 Christchurch earthquake a major review changed the boundaries and construction rules.

Under NZS 3604 and NZS 4229, New Zealand is divided into four earthquake zones, with zone 1 having the lowest earthquake risk while zone 4 having the highest risk. Buildings in zones 2, 3 and 4 have to withstand 1.6 times, twice, and three times the force of zone 1 buildings respectively.

== Housing affordability ==
=== Ownership ===
In 2017, 63% of New Zealanders lived in an owner-occupied home (this includes those who have an outstanding mortgage on their property) and 33% live in rental properties. This is the lowest rate of home ownership since 1951. This is partly due to the increase in New Zealand house prices which since 1990 have increased faster than in any other OECD country.

Housing in New Zealand has been classified as 'severely unaffordable' with a score of 6.5 under the median measure housing affordability measure. Affordability varies depending on location, with major urban centres such as Auckland and Wellington more unaffordable than smaller cities and rural areas.

=== Renting ===
In mid August 2022, the Human Rights Commission advocated an immediate freeze on rent increases and increasing the accommodation supplement to provide renters with relief in response to the recent cost of living crisis. The Commission had earlier released its People's Inquiry into Student Wellbeing in July 2022 which found that two thirds of tertiary students were unable to cover basic living costs including food, rent and healthcare.

== See also ==
- Homelessness in New Zealand
- Housing New Zealand
- New Zealand design
- New Zealand dream
