= List of New Zealand–related topics =

== New Zealand ==
- History of New Zealand
- Politics of New Zealand
- Geography of New Zealand
- Economy of New Zealand
- Demographics of New Zealand
- Culture of New Zealand
- Pākehā
- Māori
- New Zealand English
- Cinema of New Zealand
- New Zealand literature
- Music of New Zealand
- Sport in New Zealand
- Lists of New Zealanders

== History ==
- Timeline of New Zealand history
- Natural history of New Zealand
- Archaeology of New Zealand
- Māori history
- European settlers in New Zealand
- Economic history of New Zealand
- Political history of New Zealand
- Independence of New Zealand
- First voyage of James Cook
- New Zealand Wars
- Timeline of New Zealand's links with Antarctica
- List of years in New Zealand

=== Settlement and early history ===
- Treaty of Waitangi
- Colony of New Zealand
- Declaration of the Independence of New Zealand
- Musket Wars
- Provinces of New Zealand

=== Twentieth-century history ===
- Dominion of New Zealand
- Realm of New Zealand
- Military history of New Zealand
- New Zealand nuclear-free zone
- Sinking of the Rainbow Warrior
- Māori protest movement
- Air New Zealand Flight 901
- 1981 South Africa rugby union tour of New Zealand
- Rogernomics

=== Historical figures ===
- James Cook
- William Hobson
- Hongi Hika
- James Mckenzie
- George Grey
- Kate Sheppard
- Michael Joseph Savage
- Robert Muldoon
- David Lange
- Keith Park
- Edmund Hillary

== Government and politics ==
=== Executive ===
- Cabinet of New Zealand

=== Parliament ===
- New Zealand Parliament
- New Zealand House of Representatives

=== Elections ===
- New Zealand electorates
- List of New Zealand by-elections
- Electoral reform in New Zealand
- Royal Commission on the Electoral System
- Electoral Commission (New Zealand)

=== Political parties ===
- New Zealand Labour Party
- New Zealand National Party
- New Zealand Social Credit Party
- Green Party of Aotearoa New Zealand
- ACT New Zealand
- New Zealand First
- Te Pāti Māori
- The Opportunities Party

=== Office holders ===
- Monarchy of New Zealand
- Governor-General of New Zealand
- Prime Minister of New Zealand
- Deputy Prime Minister of New Zealand
- Speaker of the House of Representatives
- Leader of the Opposition
- List of ambassadors from New Zealand to other countries

=== Military ===
- New Zealand Army
- Royal New Zealand Air Force
- Royal New Zealand Navy
- Air Force Museum of New Zealand
- New Zealand Special Air Service
- Royal New Zealand Infantry Regiment
- Māori Battalion
- History of the Royal New Zealand Navy
- Royal New Zealand Navy plans

=== Law and law enforcement ===
- Supreme Court of New Zealand
- Chief Justice of New Zealand
- High Court of New Zealand
- Environment Court of New Zealand
- New Zealand Bill of Rights Act 1990
- New Zealand Police
- Capital punishment in New Zealand
- Principles of the Treaty of Waitangi
- Resource Management Act 1991
- Official Information Act 1982
- Gun law in New Zealand

=== Overseas territories ===
- Cook Islands
- Niue
- Tokelau
- Chatham Islands
- Kermadec Islands
- Ross Dependency
- New Zealand Subantarctic Islands

=== Other articles ===
- Abortion in New Zealand
- Climate change in New Zealand
- Foreign relations of New Zealand
- Christian politics in New Zealand
- Republicanism in New Zealand
- Socialism in New Zealand
- Structural discrimination in New Zealand
- LGBT rights in New Zealand

== Geography and geology ==
- Climate of New Zealand

=== Islands ===
- North Island
- South Island
- Stewart Island / Rakiura
- Waiheke Island
- Chatham Islands
- Great Barrier Island/Aotea
- Kapiti Island
- Whakaari / White Island
- Rangitoto Island

=== Regions ===
- Northland
- Auckland
- Waikato
- Bay of Plenty
- Gisborne
- Hawke's Bay
- Taranaki region
- Manawatū-Whanganui
- Wellington
- Marlborough
- Nelson
- Tasman
- West Coast
- Canterbury
- Otago
- Southland
- Chatham Islands

=== Main centres ===
- Whangārei
- Auckland (largest city)
- Hamilton
- Tauranga
- Rotorua
- Gisborne
- Napier
- Hastings
- New Plymouth
- Whanganui
- Palmerston North
- Wellington (capital city)
- Nelson
- Christchurch
- Timaru
- Queenstown
- Dunedin
- Invercargill

=== Lakes and rivers ===
- Lake Rotorua
- Lake Taupō
- Lake Benmore
- Lake Dunstan
- Lake Wakatipu
- Lake Wānaka
- Lake Manapouri
- Lake Te Anau
- Waikato River
- Clutha River
- Shotover River
- Whanganui River
- Waitaki River

=== Hills and mountains ===
- Aoraki / Mount Cook
- One Tree Hill
- Mount Herbert / Te Ahu Patiki
- Mount Aspiring / Tititea
- Mount Taranaki / Egmont
- Mount Ruapehu
- Mitre Peak
- Mount Sefton
- Mount Tasman
- Southern Alps

=== Volcanism and earthquakes ===
- List of earthquakes in New Zealand
- Volcanism of New Zealand

== Ecology and environment ==
=== Plants ===
- Kauri (Agathis australis)
- Totara (Podocarpus totara)
- New Zealand Tree Fern (Dicksonia squarrosa)
- Silver fern (Cyathea dealbata)
- Rimu (Dacrydium cupressinum)
- Cordyline australis (Cabbage tree)

=== Animals ===
- Mammals of New Zealand
- List of birds of New Zealand
- Reptiles of New Zealand
- List of amphibians of New Zealand
- Endemic insects (Wētā)
- List of crabs of New Zealand
- List of extinct animals of New Zealand

==== Invasive species in New Zealand ====
- Canada goose in New Zealand
- Common brushtail possum in New Zealand
- European hedgehog in New Zealand
- European rabbit in New Zealand
- Stoat in New Zealand

=== National parks ===
- Fiordland National Park
- Aoraki / Mount Cook National Park
- Rakiura National Park
- Tongariro National Park

== Economy ==
=== Companies ===
- Telecom New Zealand
- Air New Zealand
- SkyCity
- Auckland Airport
- Carter Holt Harvey
- Contact Energy
- Fletcher Building
- Fisher & Paykel
- Sky Television

=== Tourism ===
- Tolkien tourism

== Culture ==
=== Literary ===
- Once Were Warriors
- Katherine Mansfield
- Bridget Williams Books

=== Arts ===
- Haka
- Māori traditional textiles
- Performing arts in New Zealand
- Photography in New Zealand

=== Music ===
- Kiri Te Kanawa
- Split Enz
- Neil Finn
- Lorde
- Jemaine Clement
- Bret McKenzie
- The Brunettes
- Shihad

=== Movies ===
- The Piano
- Heavenly Creatures
- Once Were Warriors (film)
- Whale Rider
- Eagle vs Shark
- Goodbye Pork Pie
- Bad Taste
- The Price of Milk
- Sione's Wedding
- The Lord of the Rings
- King Kong (2005 film)
- The Navigator: A Medieval Odyssey
- River Queen

=== Architecture ===
- Buildings and structures in New Zealand
- Bill Alington

=== Sports ===
- Association football in New Zealand
- Australian rules football in New Zealand
- Caving in New Zealand
- Cricket in New Zealand
- Thoroughbred racing in New Zealand
- Dirt track racing in New Zealand
- Netball in New Zealand
- Rugby league in New Zealand
- Rugby union in New Zealand
- Skiing in New Zealand
- Sport New Zealand
- New Zealand at the Olympics
- Tramping in New Zealand

=== Mass media ===
- List of free-to-air channels in New Zealand
- List of print media in New Zealand

=== Television ===
- Shortland Street
- Flight of the Conchords
- Outrageous Fortune (TV series)

=== Society ===
- Social class in New Zealand
- LGBT in New Zealand
- Prostitution in New Zealand

=== Health ===
- COVID-19 pandemic in New Zealand
- HIV/AIDS in New Zealand
- McKenzie method

=== Food and drink ===
- New Zealand cuisine
- Alcohol in New Zealand

=== Celebrities ===
- Peter Jackson
- Lorde
- Sam Neill
- Taika Waititi
- Karl Urban
- Jemaine Clement
- Phil Keoghan

== Māori ==
- Haka
- Iwi
- Māori culture
- Māori language
- Māori music
- Māori mythology
- Māori politics
- Māori religion
- Māori Television
- Māori traditional textiles
- Marae
- Waka

== Travel and communications ==
=== Roads ===
- New Zealand state highway network
- Transit New Zealand
- New Zealand State Highway 1
- List of motorways and expressways
- Central Motorway Junction
- Queen Street, Auckland
- Great South Road
- Transmission Gully Motorway
- Lambton Quay

=== Ports ===
- Auckland
- Napier
- Wellington
- Picton
- Bluff
- Lyttelton
- Port Chalmers

=== Rail ===
- Auckland One Rail
- Great Journeys New Zealand
- List of railway lines in New Zealand
- List of New Zealand railway museums and heritage lines
- List of Auckland railway stations
- List of Wellington railway stations
- Locomotives of New Zealand
- New Zealand Railways Corporation
- New Zealand Railways Department
- KiwiRail
- Taieri Gorge Railway (Dunedin Railways)
- Toll New Zealand
- Tranz Metro
- Tranz Rail
- Transdev Auckland
- Transdev Wellington

=== Air travel ===
- List of airports in New Zealand
- List of airlines of New Zealand
- List of busiest airports in New Zealand
- Air New Zealand
- Air New Zealand Flight 901
- Royal New Zealand Air Force

== Education and science ==
=== Universities ===
- Auckland University of Technology
- Lincoln University
- Massey University
- University of Auckland
- University of Canterbury
- University of Otago
- University of Waikato
- Victoria University of Wellington
- University of New Zealand (dissolved in 1961 )

=== Scientists ===
- Ernest Rutherford
- Alan MacDiarmid
- Archibald McIndoe
- Maurice Wilkins
- Vaughan Jones
- Brian Barratt-Boyes
- Neil Cherry
- Beatrice Tinsley
- William Hayward Pickering

== Lists ==
- List of New Zealanders
- List of disasters in New Zealand by death toll
- List of museums in New Zealand

== See also ==
- Outline of New Zealand
- Lists of country-related topics – similar lists for other countries
