= Les Gibbard =

New Zealand cartoonist (1945–2010)

Les Gibbard (26 October 1945 – 10 October 2010) was a New Zealand-British political cartoonist, journalist, illustrator and animator. As a political cartoonist at The Guardian newspaper for 25 years, Gibbard became the longest-serving artist of his type in the publication's history. In addition to his contributions to the Guardian, Gibbard's work also featured in the Daily Mirror, the Daily Sketch, The Daily Telegraph, The Sunday Mirror, The London Evening Standard, Time Out and Melody Maker.

== Early life ==
Gibbard was born in Kaiapoi, New Zealand; he grew up in New Zealand and learnt his trade under the tutelage of Gordon Minhinnick (himself influenced by David Low), a former political cartoonist with the New Zealand Herald. After working for a number of New Zealand and Australian publications during the 1960s, Gibbard moved to London and was initially employed by The Daily Telegraph before joining The Guardian in 1969, replacing Bill Papas. At the time he joined, Gibbard was the youngest cartoonist in the paper's history at 23.

== The Guardian (1969–1994) ==
While working at The Guardian, Gibbard produced a number of striking cartoons and courted controversy during the Falklands War with a re-working of a Philip Zec cartoon "The price of petrol" which previously caused uproar during World War II. Responding to the sinking of General Belgrano, on 6 May 1982 the newspaper ran Gibbard's version of the cartoon, re-captioned with the line: "The price of sovereignty has increased - official".

Gibbard later stated: "I was unaware of the furore caused by it until I returned home later the following day to barrage of phone calls asking me how I proposed responding to being called a traitor." The cartoon was raised in the House of Commons and was cited as evidence, by the then Prime Minister Margaret Thatcher that the British media did not support military action, and rival newspaper The Sun also accused Gibbard and The Guardian of treason: "What is it but treason for The Guardian to print a cartoon, showing a British seaman clinging to a raft ... isn't that exactly calculated to weaken Britain's resolve at a time when lives have been lost, whatever the justice of her cause?" The criticism in turn led to The Sun’s leader-writer being ejected from the National Union of Journalists for “unfraternal behaviour”.

== Later life and death ==
Gibbard worked as an animator and produced his own animated political cartoon series Newshound for Granada television. He also provided illustrations for the popular New Zealand social commentary book, The Half Gallon Quarter Acre Pavlova Paradise. Gibbard drew political cartoons for Channel 4's A Week in Politics and for BBC’s Newsnight and he produced weekly cartoons for political comment show On the Record between 1988 and 1995. He has also contributed to a number of international animated features including The Super Globetrotters, Under Milk Wood and Ivor the Invisible.

He died on 10 October 2010 of a pulmonary embolism following a routine operation for knee replacement.
