= Australian Dream =

Aspirational belief in home ownership

The Australian Dream or Great Australian Dream is, in its narrowest sense, a belief that in Australia, home ownership can lead to a better life and is an expression of success and security. The term is derived from the American Dream, which describes a similar phenomenon in the United States also starting in the 1940s, although they are differentiated from each other in that the American Dream is more concerned with the abstract notion that upward social mobility in general is achievable for all while the Australian Dream is more invested specifically in home ownership as a means of prosperity. Although this standard of living is enjoyed by many in the existing Australian population, commentators have argued that rising real house prices have made it increasingly difficult to achieve the "Great Australian Dream", especially for those living in large cities and the Millennials.

It is also noted as having led to urbanisation (or more specifically suburbanisation), causing extensive urban sprawl in the major cities. In contrast to the Australian Dream, some modern urban planners have emphasised "urban consolidation" and "urban sustainability". This "smart growth" or "iGrowth" involves living in a small apartment instead of a detached home, and using public transport instead of driving a car. The key to enforcing "urban consolidation" on an Australian populace who still desire the freedom of their own home and backyard has been planning laws which ban or heavily restrict greenfield development; however some have criticised this as leading to extreme house prices.

The term has also been used to apply to broader issues. It was given a different slant by journalist Stan Grant, first in a 2015 address which went viral, followed by a 2016 essay entitled "The Australian Dream: Blood, History And Becoming", and lastly his 2019 documentary film The Australian Dream, which examines the role of racism in Australia, past and present, and questions of national and Indigenous identity, using the racial abuse of footballer Adam Goodes as a starting point.

Miriam Margolyes, in a 2020 three-part TV documentary entitled Almost Australian, interrogates what the Australian Dream means to a variety of people across the country.

== History ==
The origin of the Australian dream dates back to the period of reconstruction following World War II. The dream flowered in the 1950s and 1960s due chiefly to the expansion of Australian manufacturing, low unemployment rates, the baby boom and the removal of rent controls.

There is some evidence, however, that the vast open spaces of early colonial Australia first instilled the notion in the early generations of Australian families. It was certainly aided by the widespread ownership of the motor car. Even as it was growing, the aspirational dream became an occasional object of ridicule in art and literature, some of the strongest criticism appearing in the mid-1950s paintings of John Brack, the celebrated novels of Australian manners They're a Weird Mob (1957) by Nino Culotta (John O'Grady) and My Brother Jack (1964) by George Johnston, and Robin Boyd's fierce critique of Australian architecture The Australian Ugliness (1960).

Typically the Australian dream focused upon ownership of a detached house (often single storey) on a quarter acre suburban block, surrounded by a garden, which featured in the back a Hills Hoist and a barbecue. Notably, this mirrored the fact that while almost 50% of Australian households owned their homes through the first half of the century, the proportion jumped to more than 70 per cent in the 20 years after World War II. While many Australians saw home ownership as a domestic ideal to aspire to, artists sometimes viewed it as representing a deadening conformism and narrow-mindedness—a critical perspective advanced by Brack's bleak images of uniform box-like houses surrounded by almost identical gardens, as well as Johnston's literary depiction of a rigidly uniform suburbia where neighbours try to police one another's behaviour.

From the 1970s, the Australian dream expanded to cover possession of a swimming pool in the back-yard, a second family car, and, for the affluent, either ownership of a beach-house or taking an annual overseas holiday.

An unprecedented and unforeseen rise in property prices during the COVID-19 pandemic in Australia during 2020 and 2021, after a long period of low interest rates, has priced many young people out of the market and put "the Australian dream" out of reach for a whole generation.

The year the Australian Dream died

But the crisis is the result of "50 years of government policy failure, financialisation and greed". Particularly critical was what happened at the turn of the millennium, he argues.

— Alan Kohler, Quarterly Essay https://www.bbc.com/news/world-australia-67723760

== Homes ==
The importance of equitable access to housing (rent or buy), in the terms of having the broader economy function in an optimal fashion, cannot be underestimated.

As noted in the conclusion to Chapter 2 – 'Social aspects of home ownership' ('A good house is hard to find' report):

"2.8 The Productivity Commission concluded that: Access to affordable and quality housing is central to community wellbeing.
Apart from meeting the basic need for shelter, it provides a foundation for family and social stability, and contributes to improved health and educational outcomes and a productive workforce.
Thus it enhances both economic performance and 'social capital'. (Productivity Commission (2004, p. 3).)

2.52 Given its importance in promoting and maintaining a functional, stable and just society, housing should not be considered just another commodity. Many of the social benefits we see flowing from home ownership – such as security, connection to community and control over one's lived environment – can also be conferred through more secure tenancy models. . . "

There is a growing trend in the housing market, where current home owners are accessing equity in their home to buy multiple properties, they often engage some kind of strategy – whether it be Buy and Hold, Flipping, Renovating for Profit, or some other complicated means to hold and sell properties in an ever-increasing market that can be difficult to navigate. The Australian dream has changed.

== In popular culture ==
The Australian Dream has been expressed in many mainstream movies, poems and books.

- Emoh Ruo (film) (1985)
- Australian Dream (film) (1987)
- The Castle (film) (1997)

Television shows that depict suburban life and the Australian Dream include:

- Kingswood Country (1980–1984)
- Neighbours (1985–)
- Hey Dad..! (1987–1994)
- Kath & Kim (2002–2007)

== See also ==
- American Dream
- Chinese Dream
- European dream
- New Zealand dream

Australian economy:

- Australian economy
- Australian property bubble
- Home ownership in Australia
- Median household income in Australia and New Zealand
