= Economic inequality in New Zealand =

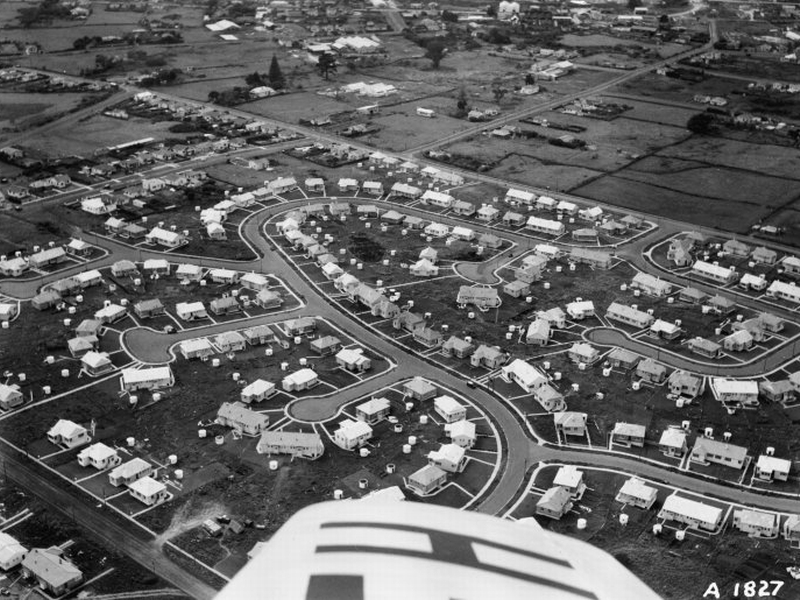
An egalitarian New Zealand was briefly realised in the interwar and post-war periods, when successive governments sponsored a massive state housing programme.

Economic inequality in New Zealand is one of the social issues present in the country.

Between 1982 and 2011, New Zealand's gross domestic product grew by 35%. Almost half of that increase went to a small group who were already the richest in the country. During this period, the average income of the top 10% of earners in New Zealand (those earning more than $72,000) almost doubled going from $56,300 to $100,200. The average income of the poorest tenth increased by 13% from $9700 to $11,000.

Growing inequality is confirmed by Statistics New Zealand which keeps track of income disparity using the P80/20 ratio. This ratio shows the difference between high household incomes (those in the 80th percentile) and low household incomes (those in the 20th percentile). The inequality ratio increased between 1988 and 2004, and decreased until the 2008 financial crisis, increasing again to 2011 and then declining again from then. By 2013, the disposable income of high-income households was more than two-and-a-half times larger than that of low-income households. In 2019 it was 2.7 times. Highlighting the disparity, the top 1% of the population now owns 16% of the country's wealth – the richest 5% owns 38% – while half the population, including beneficiaries and pensioners, earn less than $24,000.

== Growth in numbers on welfare ==
Factors contributing to the growth in inequality include substantial cuts in the top income tax rate in 1986–88 combined with a surge in unemployment caused by Rogernomics and the stock market crash of 1987 which pushed more people onto welfare. Then in 1991, benefits were also cut back substantially as part of the 'reforms' and those on welfare have been struggling ever since.

Professor Jonathan Boston of Victoria University says nearly 20% of poorer households in New Zealand now depend on welfare benefits. He says the growing gap between rich and poor enables the rich to "exercise disproportionate political influence", and that "if disadvantaged citizens are not to be excluded from political life, they must have access to education, healthcare and social assistance". British epidemiologists, Richard Pickett and Kate Wilkinson, argue that inequality is damaging for everyone in society, not just the poor. They say that when the gap between the top and the bottom levels of society becomes too wide, this erodes trust and empathy between citizens leading to alienation and social fragmentation. This exacerbates a multitude of health and social problems such as high infant mortality, obesity, teenage pregnancy, crime and imprisonment.

== Effects on social indicators ==
In 2014, Pickett and Wilkinson were invited to Auckland and Dunedin to discuss the relevance of their research to New Zealand. They argued that as inequality in New Zealand has grown, there has been a dramatic increase in the youth suicides. However, both total and youth suicide rates have been fluctuating, but general stable from 2006 to 2015. The proliferation of food banks increased dramatically; and the number of families and children living in poverty has increased. However serious crimes causing injury and death decreased by 20% between 2012 and 2014, whilst assaults decreased by 3% over the same period. At the same time, health care spending has increased. In 2011 Health spending accounted for 10% of GDP, higher than the OECD average of 9.3%. As in many OECD countries, health spending in New Zealand slowed down post the GFC but still reached 3% in real terms in 2010 and 2011 – higher than the OECD average. in 2012 New Zealand has 2.7 doctors per 1,000 population, an increase from 2.2 in the year 2000.

In 2012, life expectancy at birth in New Zealand stood at 81.5 years, more than one year higher than the OECD average of 80.2 years.

== Effects on growth ==
In December 2014, the OECD released the Global Income Inequality Report which said "[r]ising inequality is estimated to have knocked more than 10 percentage points off growth in ...New Zealand" between 1990 and 2010. The paper found no evidence that redistributive policies, such as taxes and social benefits, harm economic growth, provided these policies are well designed, targeted and implemented. It concluded that "focusing exclusively on growth and assuming that its benefits will automatically trickle down to the different segments of the population may undermine growth in the long run."

== Poverty ==
In the 21st century concern has been growing that an increasing number of New Zealanders, especially children, have been pushed into poverty where poverty is defined in income terms as households living at below 60% of the national median income. In 2005, an international report found that one in six children in New Zealand were being raised in poverty – making New Zealand children 23rd out of 26 rich nations, the fourth poorest of those rated in the report. In 2009 according to NCCSS, over half a million New Zealanders, including 163,000 children were living in poverty. The Expert Advisory Group established by the Children's Commissioner found that the number of children falling below the threshold has continued to grow. In 2013, around 265,000 children, a quarter of all children in New Zealand, were now "mired in poverty".

Percentage of children in New Zealand living in households with less than 50 percent of the median equivalised disposable household income after deducting housing costs, year ended June 2013–2022

Statistics New Zealand also publishes a range of data on the economic well-being of New Zealanders and, in 2012, released a discussion paper highlighting the need for government agreement on the development of more useful criteria and statistics related to poverty. Currently the information that is collected is 'static data' – it shows the percentage of citizens below a certain level of income. But New Zealand is unique among western OECD countries in that it does not collect 'dynamic' data which captures the extent to which people move in and out of poverty.

In 2013 over a dozen different reports were released which focused on the issue and the need to develop agreed ways of describing and measuring poverty. However, the National Government resisted these attempts maintaining that "endless arguments about definition and measurement are a waste of time". Because of the Government's reluctance to define and measure the problem, in 2012 Children's Commissioner Dr Russell Wills, established an expert advisory group which produced a comprehensive report, called Solutions to Child Poverty in New Zealand: Evidence for Action which contains 78 recommendations to combat poverty. Dr Wills also set up the Child Poverty Monitor to highlight the living conditions of children in New Zealand on an ongoing basis.

== See also ==
- Social class in New Zealand
