= New Zealand dream =

Aspirational belief in home ownership

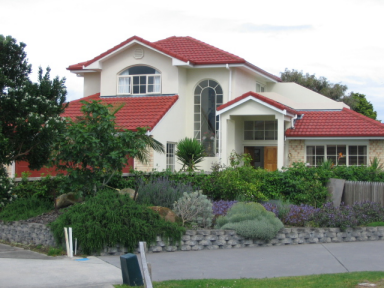
A new upmarket family house in Northland in New Zealand

The New Zealand dream (or the Kiwi dream) centres on the acquisition of a family house on a quarter-acre section, with at least one motor vehicle. The New Zealand dream resembles the Australian Dream. For many New Zealanders this dream could also include a pleasure boat, a bach and a holiday at the beach.

The New Zealand dream of acquiring a family home was supported by government policies from the late-nineteenth century through much of the twentieth century, although housing affordability has become a political issue, with limited measures to alleviate rising house prices.

An alternative to this New Zealand dream is "smart growth". The smart-growth concept has no quarter-acre section, no family house and no car. People live in small apartments and use public transport. Smart growth commonly occurs in countries with little free land (such as Hong Kong).

== Nation building ==
=== Children ===

When New Zealand and Australian couples have children they show a very strong preference for family housing (Figure 1). Australian research shows 85% of people who live in apartments would rather live in a house.

American families also prefer family houses, with studies showing that Americans living in multi-family dwellings (apartments etc.) have less children, lowering the demand for schools . One hundred typical homes generate an average of 54.7 school-aged children; but multifamily homes generate only about two thirds the students, with 36.7 school-aged children per 100 households. Apartment households have much lower incomes than those living in family houses and are more likely to suffer from poverty related problems such as overcrowding.

US dwelling type	Median household income (1999)
Family houses	$50,739
Apartments	$27,543

Studies have shown that fertility is highest among couples living in single-family houses and lowest among those residing in apartments. Experts claim that shortages of family housing can cause low birth rates. “Some have suggested that, like laboratory specimens, Italians have responded to their ever-more-crowded-suburbs and cramped apartments by curbing procreation”. Children “aren't wanted in the condominia (apartments), in public places where they can disturb”. “Houses are bigger in the U.S. and generally more available. That may help explain why Americans have more babies”.

Using a scatterplot (Figure 2) has the advantage that cultural effects are average out, revealing the underlying effect of housing on fertility rates. The correlation value (R=0.81) indicates that there is a strong positive correlation between family housing and fertility rates. Advanced countries that have mostly apartments are typically producing only 2/3rds of the children of countries that have mostly family housing.

Having children sustains culture and is good for the economy. Overall Anglo countries have enough children to be approximately sustainable. New Zealand and the United States produce a slight surplus of children, while Ireland, Australia and the UK have modest deficits.

	Fertility rate
New Zealand	2.18
United States	2.10
Anglo countries	2.03
Ireland	2.03
Australia	1.93
United Kingdom	1.90
Canada	1.59
City of Vancouver	1.06

=== Skilled migration ===
New Zealand has a demand for more skilled workers. There is a limited supply of highly skilled migrants available and competition between countries. Housing is one of the factors affecting migration. "Access to affordable and suitable housing is an indicator of positive settlement in society, and home ownership is an indicator of economic wellbeing and represents an intention of long-term settlement". To attract highly skilled migrants New Zealand must have desirable living conditions, otherwise they will go somewhere else, such as the United States.

The United Kingdom is by far New Zealand's most important source country of skilled migrants. British studies show that only 2% of British citizens want to live in a low rise apartment, and only 1% in a high rise apartment block. The vast majority prefer to live in a house.

British people are also very fond of spending time in the garden, with more than 70% claiming that it improves their quality of life, and half (48%) of whom felt it was the most enjoyable activity above watching TV (33%) and shopping (14%). A third of Brits also believe that gardens are romantic and can boost their love lives.

== New homes ==
Over time Kiwi homes are becoming larger and more luxurious. While old homes were mostly box-shaped bungalows, new houses are architecturally more complex, creating houses that are more individualistic and aesthetically pleasing. Popular extras can include a rumpus room (kids playroom), walk-in wardrobes, walk-in kitchen pantries, more bedrooms and extra bathrooms.

New homes in New Zealand increasingly incorporate energy-efficient features, including improved insulation, double glazing and heat pump systems. Building regulations establish requirements for insulation and energy efficiency in new residential construction. The adoption of these technologies reflects efforts to improve residential energy performance and reduce household energy consumption.

The floor area of new dwellings built in New Zealand is extremely variable ranging from as little as 30 m^{2} for a small apartment to more than 500 m^{2} for a large house. The average floor area is approximately 200 m^{2}, similar to new American and Australian homes. The housing indicator value of new homes (=150) is higher than for the existing stock (see Figure 2 above), which may cause fertility rates to gradually rise over the coming decades.

Note: The United States, China and the European Union are the world's biggest economies, representing more than half of Global GDP. Shanghai is considered to be a trend setter for Chinese development. US floor area dropped in 2008 because of the credit crisis.

== Motor vehicles ==
The production of affordable motor vehicles has enabled the development of a suburban lifestyle culture, which combines the advantages of city life, with the luxury of ample living space.

In New Zealand ownership of a motor vehicle is regarded by many as a rite of passage, representing the important transition from adolescence to being an independent adult.

International statistics show that New Zealanders have one of the highest rates of motor vehicle ownership in the world (Figure 5). Toyota is the most popular make, while Holden Commodore is the most popular model.

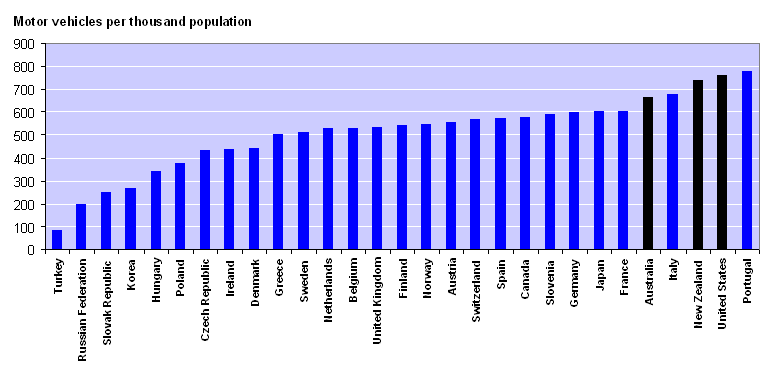
Figure 5. 2005 Motor vehicles, Source OECD

== See also ==
- European dream
- American dream
- Australian Dream
- The Half Gallon Quarter Acre Pavlova Paradise, a light hearted and satirical book about New Zealand culture
