= NZS 3604 =

New Zealand technical standard for timber-framed buildings

NZS 3604 Timber-framed buildings is a New Zealand technical standard which sets out specifications and methods for designing and constructing light timber-framed houses and other low-rise buildings. When read together with the amendments in Building Code acceptable solution B1/AS1, it allows the construction of code-compliant buildings up to three storeys high (two full storeys and a third storey in the roof space) on good ground without the need for specific structural engineering. The standard is maintained by Standards New Zealand.

The first edition of NZS 3604 was published in November 1978, replacing provisions in the NZS 1900 Model building bylaw series. Similar timber-framed building standards have existed in New Zealand since the aftermath of the 1931 Hawke's Bay earthquake. The current revision of the standard is NZS 3604:2011, published in February 2011.

NZS 3604 is New Zealand's most sought-after technical standard, used in the design and construction of an estimated 93 per cent of light timber-framed buildings. In 2019, the Government funded free online access to the standard to increase accessibility and reduce building compliance costs.

== Scope ==
NZS 3604 covers low- and normal-importance light timber-framed buildings such as standalone houses, medium-density housing and many small commercial buildings. It covers buildings up to two full storeys high, plus a third storey in the roof space, on good ground. In a three-storey building, the floor area of the highest storey cannot exceed half the floor area of the lowest storey. The maximum building height allowed is 10 metres (33 ft), measured from ground level to the apex of the roof.

Good ground is defined as soil that has an ultimate bearing capacity of 300 kilopascals (6,300 lb/sq ft). Soils such as sand, peat and expansive clay, and areas subject to subsidence or liquefaction are not considered good ground under the standard.

The standard allows a maximum snow loading of 2 kPa (42 lb/sq ft). This covers areas below 350–400 metres (1,150–1,310 ft) elevation in Southland, Otago and most of Canterbury (south of Cheviot), and below 850 m (2,790 ft) elevation in the remainder of the South Island and the lower and central North Island.

The maximum roof pitch is 60°, and walls may be pitched up to 20° only for forming mansard roofs. This means most A-frame buildings are outside the standard's scope.

== Revisions ==
Since NZS 3604's introduction in 1978, the standard has been through six revisions:

- NZS 3604:1978 Code of practice for light timber frame buildings not requiring specific design – published November 1978.
- NZS 3604:1981 Code of practice for light timber frame buildings not requiring specific design – published August 1981.
- NZS 3604:1984 Code of practice for light timber frame buildings not requiring specific design – published October 1984.
- NZS 3604:1990 Code of practice for light timber frame buildings not requiring specific design – published December 1990.
- NZS 3604:1999 Timber Framed Buildings – published June 1999.
- NZS 3604:2011 Timber-framed buildings – published February 2011.

As of April 2021, Standards New Zealand is revising NZS 3604, with a new edition of the standard due to be published in 2023. The proposed changes include extending the scope of the standard to cover building three full storeys (to accommodate increasing demand for medium-density housing) and building on sites with expansive clay and medium liquefaction risk (e.g. TC2 land in Christchurch).

== Access ==
Copies of NZS 3604 are available for purchase from Standards New Zealand. As of July 2021, a hard copy of the standard costs $310 excluding GST ($356.50 including GST).

In July 2019, the Government extended free online access to the entire NZS 3604 standard, allowing people to download and print one PDF copy of the standard. The free access is intended to increase accessibility to the standard, and to reduce building compliance costs. The standard is funded through the Building Levy, which is collected on building consent applications.
