= The Half-Gallon Quarter-Acre Pavlova Paradise =

- Author: Austin Mitchell
- Publisher: Whitcombe and Tombs
- Publication date: 1972
- Publication place: New Zealand
- ISBN: 978-0-7233-0349-7
- OCLC: 714880
- Dewey Decimal: 919.31/03/3027
- LC Class: DU427 .M53

The Half-Gallon Quarter-Acre Pavlova Paradise was a popular book by Austin Mitchell, published by Whitcombe and Tombs (Christchurch, 1972), with illustrations by Les Gibbard. It provided a witty, satirical description of life in 1960s New Zealand, and Kiwi culture.

Described as "a celebrated vision of New Zealand as heaven on earth", the book was a great success in New Zealand. The phrase "Half-Gallon Quarter-Acre Pavlova Paradise" soon became part of the New Zealand vernacular, with the term "quarter-acre pavlova paradise" being included in the Dictionary of New Zealand English. Mitchell revisited New Zealand 30 years after writing his original volume, and motivated by the social changes he observed, he penned a sequel entitled Pavlova Paradise Revisited.

== Terminology ==
- "Half Gallon", popularly called the "Half G", was the standard size of a flagon of beer then sold in New Zealand pubs
- "Quarter Acre" referred to the ubiquitous suburban section of land on which most Kiwis built their homes
- "Pavlova", a popular New Zealand dessert

== See also ==
- New Zealand English
