= International rankings of New Zealand =

This is a list of New Zealand's international rankings on a range of social, economic and other criteria.

== Political and economic rankings ==
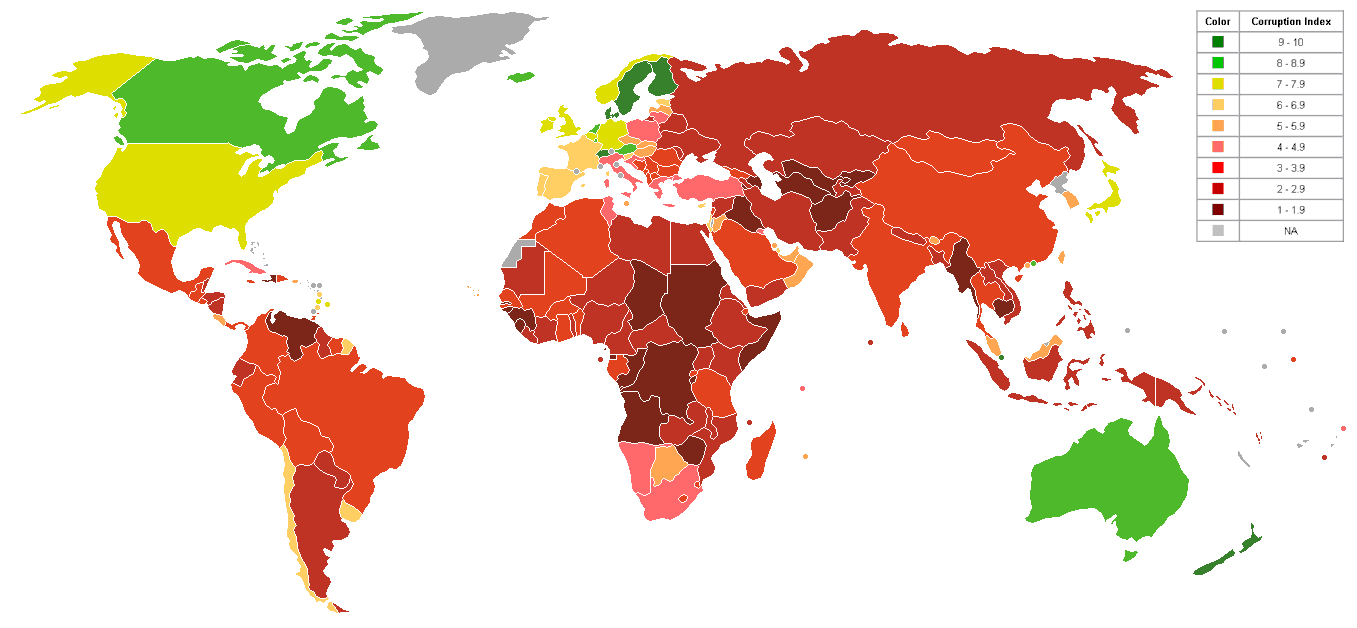
New Zealand is one of the least corrupt countries, according to Transparency International.

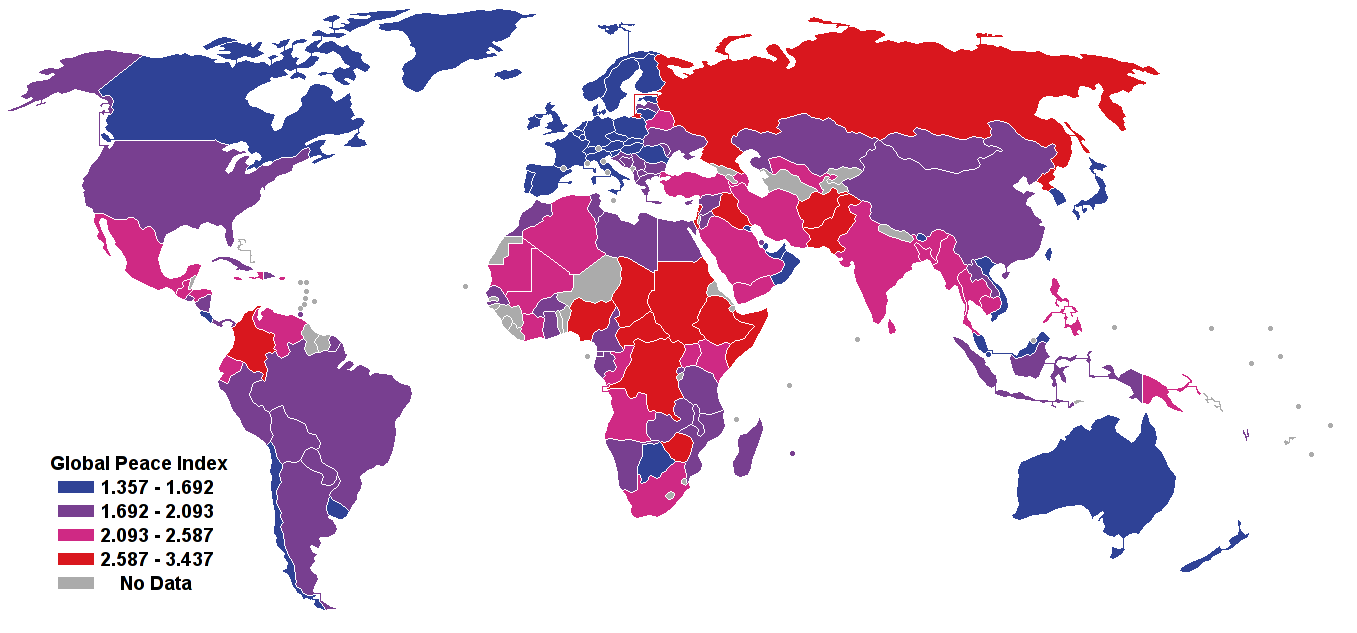
World map of the Global Peace Index. Countries appearing more blue are ranked as more peaceful on the Index, countries appearing more red are ranked as less peaceful.

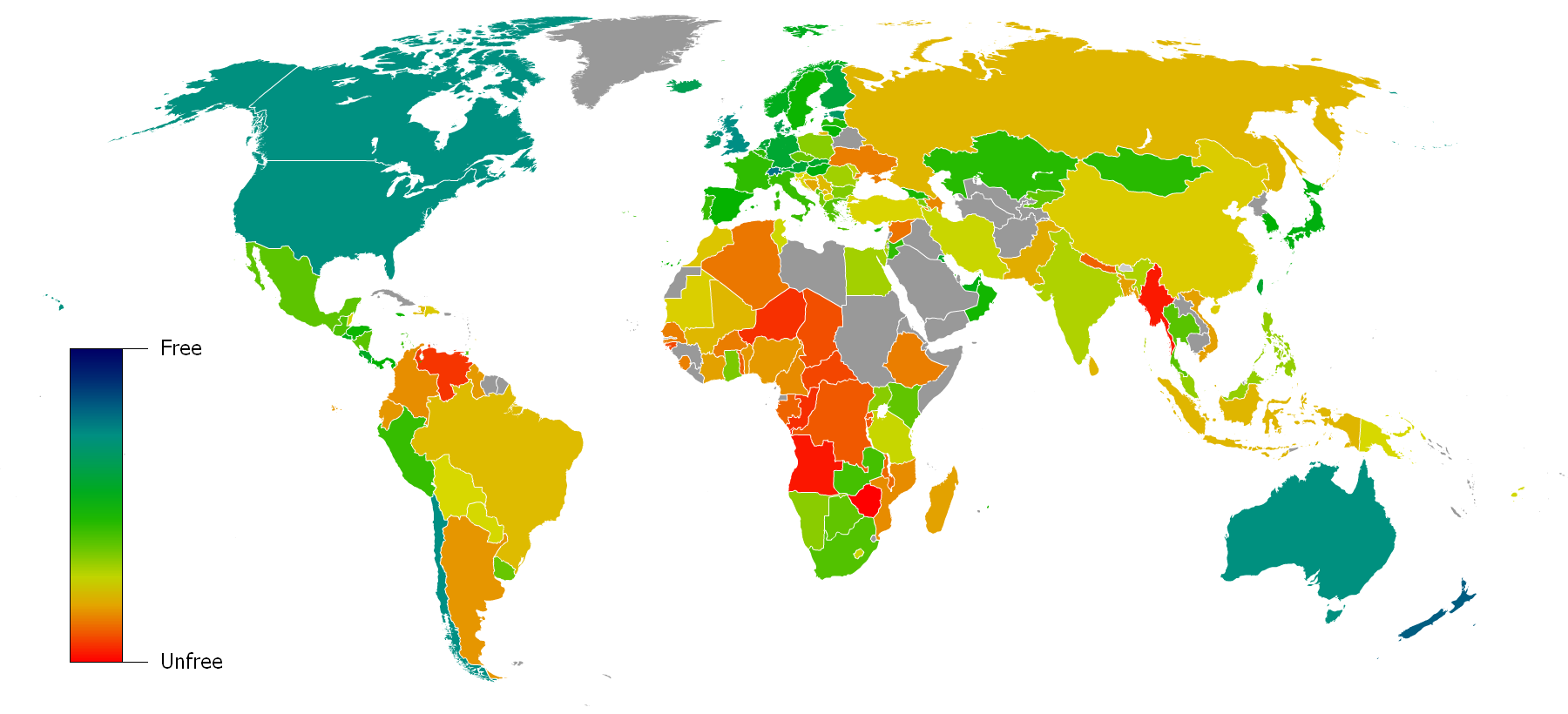
Map of countries by 2008 Economic Freedom of the World, published by the Fraser Institute

Ease of Doing Business Index, 2020 – 1st out of 191 countries; 1st in the sub-categories of Starting a Business and Getting Credit.
Freedom in the World, 2025 – 99/100; of which, political rights score 40/40, and civil liberties score 59/60.
World Press Freedom Index, 2025 – 16th out of 180 countries at 81.37/100.
GDP per capita – 29th highest (2016), at I$36,172
Human Development Index – 17th highest (2025), at 0.938
Income equality – 54th most equal, at 36.2 (Gini Index)
Literacy rate – 10th equal at 99.0%
Unemployment rate – 48th lowest, at 4.0%.
Global Peace Index – 3rd at 1.282
Corruption – Least corrupt, at 9.4 on Corruption Perceptions Index
Economic freedom – 4th freest, at 80.6 on Index of Economic Freedom (2022), and 3rd, at 8.28 on Economic Freedom of the World index
Fragile States Index, 172/177, being one of the few "sustainable" states in the world.
World Intellectual Property Organization: Global Innovation Index 2026, ranked 24 out of 139 countries

== Health rankings ==
Fertility rate- 155th most fertile, at 1.79 per woman

Birth rate – 140th most births, at 13.90 per 1000 people

Infant mortality – 169th most deaths, at 5.85 per 1000 live births

Death rate – 123rd highest death rate, at 7.52 per 1000 people
Life Expectancy – 17th highest, at 81.6 years (2015)

Suicide Rate – 72nd highest suicide rate, at 14.4 for males and 5.0 for females per 100,000 people (2014)

HIV/AIDS rate – 133rd highest percentage out of 162 countries, at 0.1%
Obesity rate – 22nd highest obesity rate out of 191 countries, at 30.8% according to The World Factbook.

In 2005 the International Agency for Research on Cancer found New Zealand men and women to have the third highest cancer rates in the world.

In 2012, New Zealand had the 12th highest rate of cancer out of the 34 OECD countries.

== Other rankings ==
- CO_{2} emissions – 49th highest emissions, at 7.22 tonnes per capita (2023)
- Electricity Consumption – 59th highest consumption of electricity, at 43.9 TWh (2023)
- Broadband Internet access – 15th highest uptake in OECD, at 29.5% (2008)
- List of countries by beer consumption per capita – 27th highest out of around 50 countries, at 61 litres per capita (2019)
- Environmental Performance Index – Comprising; Environmental health, air quality, water resources, biodiversity and habitat, productive natural resources, Sustainable energy – 7th out of 80 countries, at 88.9/100 (2007)
- Legatum Global Prosperity Index – Ranked most prosperous country in the world (2016)
- Ease of paying tax – 9th easiest (2008)
- Imprisonment rate – 68th highest out of 217, at 202 prisoners per 100,000 people (2016)
- List of countries by intentional homicide rate – 191st out of 218 countries (27th lowest rate)
- Victimisation rate – 3rd highest out of 30, with 21.5% of people aged 16 or more being victims (2008)
- Top Country Award – Won the honour two years in a row (2007, 2008) from Wanderlust Magazine
- Good Country Index – Ranked 5th out of 195 (2014)
- Better Life Index – Ranked 12th of the 41 OECD countries based on statistics and perceptions of quality of life (2025)

== See also ==
- List of international rankings
