= Quarter acre =

Australian and New Zealand term for a suburban plot of land

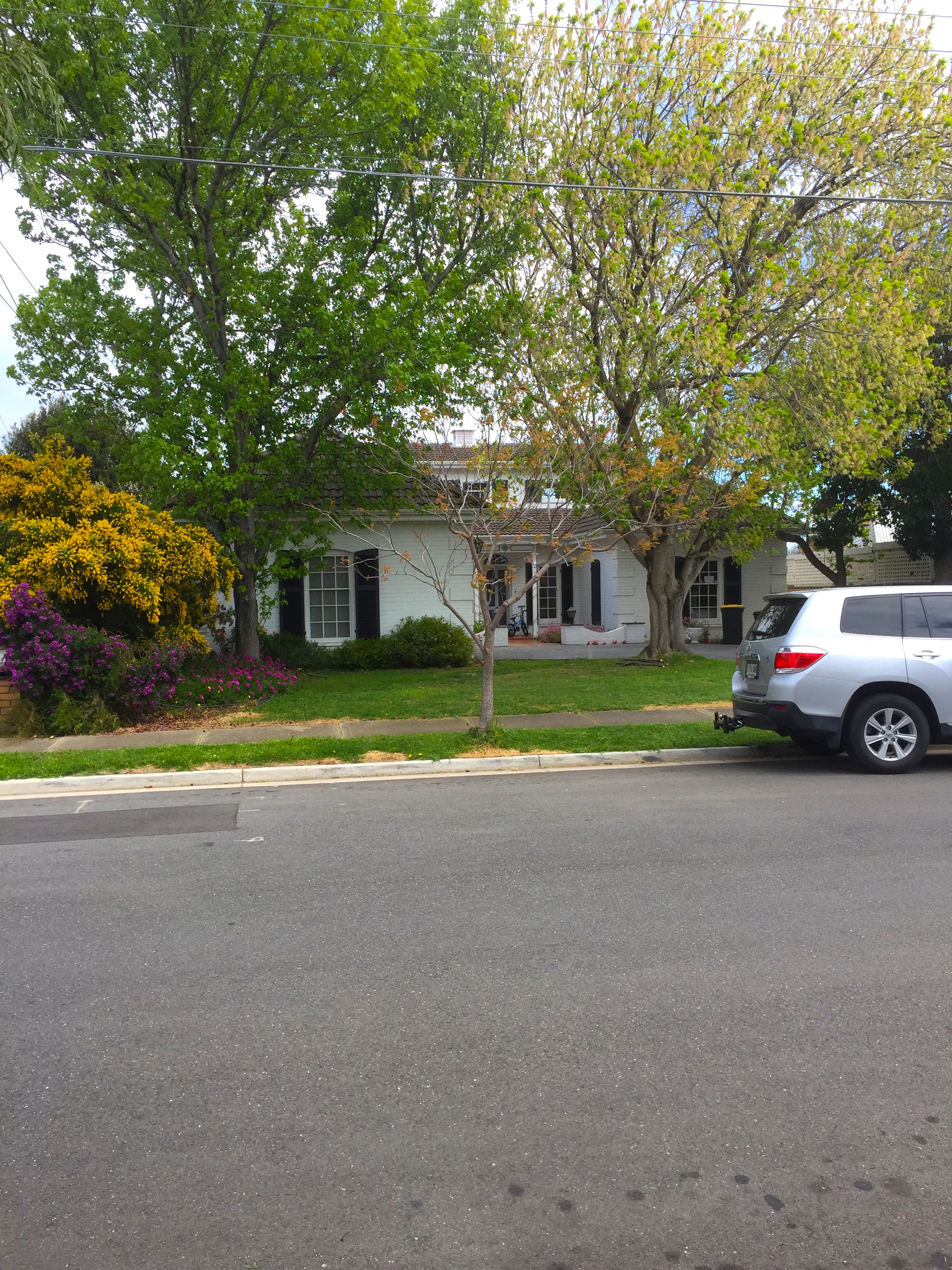
House on a block in Adelaide, South Australia

In Australian and New Zealand English, a quarter acre is a term for a suburban plot of land. Traditionally, Australians and New Zealanders aspired to own a 3- or 4-bedroom house or bungalow on a section of around a quarter of an acre (about 1,000 square metres), also known locally as the Australian Dream or the New Zealand dream. The land was frequently put to use with vegetable gardens, fruit trees, or lawns for family recreation.

Demand for quarter-acre blocks was influenced by the 'garden city' movement and driven by a desire for more space and healthier surroundings than offered by older, crowded inner-city areas. Later, easy access to motor vehicles allowed for more low-density urban sprawl of blocks of this size. Demand in Australia was also driven by waves of European migrants, who were eager to own homes, and might not have had the opportunity to do so in Europe.

The quarter-acre aspiration has changed in recent decades, with subdivisions, infill housing, apartments, and townhouses becoming more common in large cities, and nearby lifestyle farming blocks becoming popular. Most "quarter-acre" sections are not exactly a quarter of an acre. With urban growth, properties tend to be smaller with new subdivisions averaging a half or less of the classic quarter-acre.

== See also ==
- Rood, an Old English unit of area, equal to quarter of an acre
- The Half-Gallon Quarter-Acre Pavlova Paradise, a popular book by Austin Mitchell
- White picket fence, a similar concept in the United States
