= Social class in New Zealand =

Social class in New Zealand is a product of both Māori and Western social structures. Researchers have traditionally discussed New Zealand, a first-world country, as a "classless society", but this claim is problematic in a number of ways. Since at least the 1980s it has become easier to distinguish between the wealthy and the underclass in New Zealand society.

== Māori hierarchies ==
Māori society traditionally placed emphasis on rank, which derived from ancestry (whakapapa). Chiefs invariably descended from other chiefs, although chieftainship was not the exclusive right of the first-born son of the previous chief. If he did not show signs of rangatiratanga ability he would be passed over in favour of a brother or other relative. In some tribes women could take on leading roles, although this was not usual. Women, lowly-born men, and even people from other tribes were able to achieve positions of considerable influence. Such people have included Princess Te Puea Herangi (niece of King Mahuta) and "kingmaker" Wiremu Tamihana (a younger son of a chief). Tohunga had special status. Commoners (tūtūā) did not. Until the advent of Christianity in the early 19th-century Māori customarily enslaved prisoners-of-war. Slaves had no rights and could be killed at the will of their master. However their children became free members of the tribe.

Present-day Māori society, though far less hierarchical than traditionally, remains stratified by European standards. A disproportionate number of Māori MPs have come from chiefly families, for example, and kaumātua have special status. However, a number of lowly-born Māori have achieved positions of considerable mana within their communities by virtue of their achievements or learning.

== The myth of the 'classless society' ==
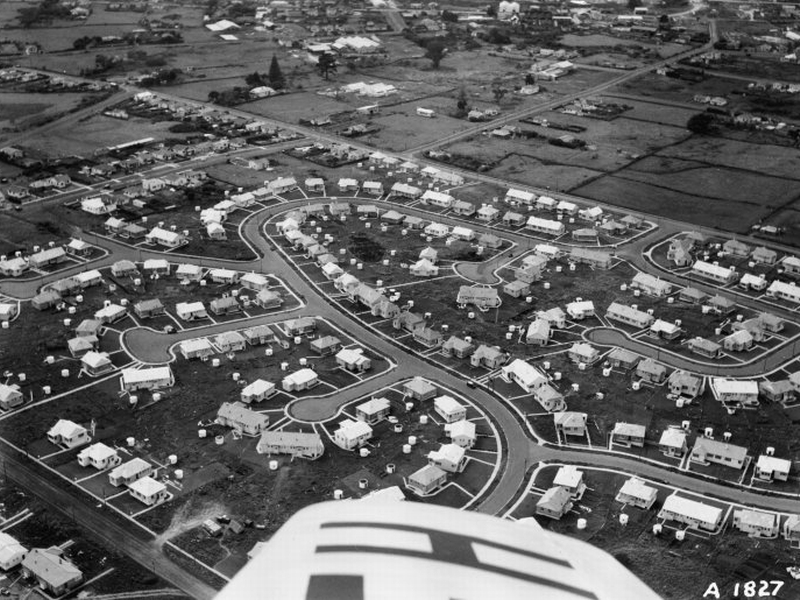
An egalitarian New Zealand was briefly realised in the decades after the 1936 Budget, when successive governments sponsored a massive state housing programme.

Until the 1980s, it was claimed that New Zealand was a 'classless society'. Historian Keith Sinclair wrote in 1969 that although New Zealand was not a classless society, "it must be more nearly classless... than any advanced society in the world". From the nineteenth century, a number of visitors also made this claim, for example British socialists Sidney and Beatrice Webb, and politician Austin Mitchell. The evidence for this was the relatively small range of wealth (that is, the wealthiest did not earn hugely more than the poorest earners), lack of deference to authority figures, high levels of class mobility, a high standard of living for working-class people compared to Britain, progressive labour laws which protected workers and encouraged trade union membership, and a welfare state which was developed in New Zealand before most other countries. Also, during the postwar years, New Zealand became an increasingly prosperous society, with the majority of New Zealanders coming to attain an affluent lifestyle. As noted by the historian William Ball Sutch in 1966,

Living standards rose in the post-war years through a combination of good prices for exports, borrowing abroad, and the much greater use of internal resources made possible by full production. And as the New Zealand wage structure, taxation system, social security benefits and family farmers combined to make the basic family income fairly high, a higher proportion of people in New Zealand shared the increased amount of goods and services than would have been the case in any other country. This is why most New Zealand families have good housing and extensive durable goods, including a motor-car.

=== Critiques ===
Data from a 1973–74 household survey, however, suggested that as many as 20% of parents and 25% of children may have been in families with a material standard of living below that of a couple on the minimum pension.

James Belich has argued that most of this is not evidence of an absence of class but rather of the relatively high status and standard of living of the working-class in the nineteenth and early twentieth centuries. Unlike in Britain at this time, working-class New Zealanders could regularly eat meat, own their own homes, and own horses (and later cars), while still being categorised as working-class. Until the advent of compulsory secondary education in the 1930s, class mobility was limited, although much less so than in Britain.

It has also been argued that in New Zealand, race takes the place of class, with Māori and other Polynesians earning less, usually having lower living standards and levels of education, and usually working in lower earning jobs than New Zealanders of European descent. They also face prejudice akin to that facing working-class people in multiple European countries.

New Zealanders' egalitarianism has been criticised as discouraging and denigrating ambition and individual achievement and success – a phenomenon known colloquially as 'Tall Poppy Syndrome'. New Zealanders tend to value modesty and distrust those who talk about their own merits. They especially dislike anyone who seems to consider themselves better than others even if the person in question is demonstrably more talented or successful than others. It is partly for this reason that mountaineer Sir Edmund Hillary is so admired in New Zealand; despite being the first person to climb Mount Everest, he was always modest. Extreme humility was arguably partly responsible for the early death of Prime Minister Norman Kirk, who might have survived his various health problems had he used his status to get preferential treatment from the public health system, or used private healthcare.

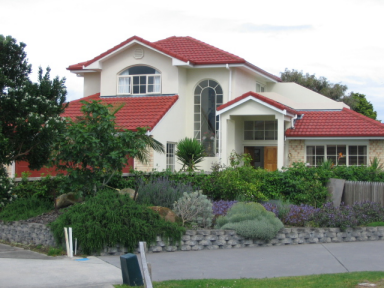
Modern house at Marsden Cove, Northland, New Zealand

== Rogernomics and inequality ==
New Zealand's claims to be a classless society were seriously undermined in the 1980s and 1990s by the economic reforms of the fourth Labour government and its successor, the fourth National government. The reforms (sometimes called Rogernomics) made by these governments severely weakened the power of unions, removed a lot of protection from workers, cut social welfare benefits and made state housing less affordable. After these reforms, the gap between rich and poor New Zealanders was increased dramatically, with the incomes of the richest 10% of New Zealanders advancing while the other 90% stayed largely static. In addition the number of New Zealanders living in poverty is much higher than in the 1970s. In a 2011 article entitled "Countries with the Biggest Gaps Between Rich and Poor", BusinessWeek ranked New Zealand at 6th in the world:

The U.N. Development Program recently came out with a report looking, among other things, at income inequality worldwide... According to the OECD, New Zealand had the biggest rise in inequality among member nations in the two decades starting in the mid-1980s.

Although wealth is much more unevenly distributed than previously, New Zealand still lacks most of the overt signals of class which mark countries such as the United States. Most people are not concerned about what others' parents do for a living, who a person is descended from, or where they were educated, and New Zealanders almost invariably have more respect for those who have earned their money through hard work than those who have inherited it or made it through investment.

=== Consequences ===
The trend of greater social disparity has also seen a change in attitudes. Younger New Zealanders increasingly accept inequality as an unavoidable social reality, and egalitarian concerns are less popular.

The 'Brain Drain' (emigration of skilled young workers) is a troubling phenomenon for the Government, and often cited by Opposition parties in election campaigns. Since the introduction of student fees in 1989, university graduates have increasingly chosen to live and work abroad. Studies suggest that around 25% of kiwi graduates will emigrate upon graduation, usually selecting Australia, the UK or Canada as their new home.

== Measuring social strata ==
=== Elley-Irving 1972 ===
In 1972 Elley and Irving published Socioeconomic Status in New Zealand, which became one of the most cited papers in New Zealand social sciences. They outlined a socioeconomic index, now known as 'Elley-Irving (E-I)', based on 1966 Census data. E-I proposed six social strata based upon education and income, and grouped by occupation.

The publication of the scale was welcomed by many researchers but regarded with suspicion by a number of lay critics who presumably clung to the belief that New Zealand was still a classless society. One newspaper headlined the production of a "snobbery scale". Such characterizations, and the numerous critics who misinterpreted its intentions, no doubt added to the frequency of its citing, but it is true that many researchers have made appropriate use of it for its original purpose. It is cited often because it is a useful tool.

— Warwick B. Elley, describing the impact of his paper

=== NZSEI 1996 ===
In the 1990s, P. Davis et al. published New Zealand Socioeconomic Index of Occupational Status, known as NZSEI. It was based on a 'returns to human capital' model of the stratification process and originally used data from the 1991 New Zealand census (n=1,051,926) to generate scores for 97 occupational groups. It was later updated using 2006 Census data. NZSEI is a linear scale of ranked occupation, produced using an algorithm involving age, income and education, and aggregated to six discrete groupings (called Socio-economic Status, SES) to enable comparison with E-I and ISEI.

NZSEI96: Absolute and percentage sex differences in mean income and education
| Class | Population distribution | Mean income ($000) | | Income diff. by sex (M-F) | | Mean years of Education | | Education diff. by sex (M-F) | |
|---|---|---|---|---|---|---|---|---|---|
| SES | % | Males | Females | % diff | $000s | Males | Females | % diff | Years |
| 1 | 6.3 | 67 | 50 | 34 | 17 | 14.4 | 14.8 | −3 | −0.4 |
| 2 | 6.6 | 51 | 42 | 21 | 9 | 14.7 | 15.1 | −3 | −0.4 |
| 3 | 27.6 | 45 | 35 | 27 | 10 | 12.9 | 13.3 | −3 | −0.4 |
| 4 | 20.5 | 33 | 35 | −6 | −2 | 11.9 | 12.0 | −1 | −0.1 |
| 5 | 18.7 | 32 | 30 | 7 | 2 | 11.7 | 12.1 | −3 | −0.4 |
| 6 | 20.2 | 29 | 26 | 12 | 3 | 11.9 | 11.8 | 1 | 0.1 |

According to the above data, the average income reported by males is considerably higher than that of females for five of the socioeconomic groups. With the exception of SES group four where the female income is higher, males earn on average between 7 and 34% more than females.

The NZSEI is derived from Census data of employed people, but it can be extended to most of the population using previous occupation (if retired or currently unemployed), or the occupation of the household's main income earner.

=== Other indices ===
- The NZDep2006 Index of Deprivation is an index of geographic deprivation based upon 9 variables—telephone, benefit, unemployment, household income, car access, single parent family, no qualifications, home ownership, overcrowding.
- Caldwell & Brown published a popular book, which identified eight "hidden tribes" in New Zealand, labelling them after various towns or suburbs: North Shore, Grey Lynn, Balclutha, Remuera, Otara, Raglan, Cuba Street, Papatoetoe.
- In 2013, Statistics New Zealand published "New Zealand socio-economic index 2006" (NZSEI06) using data from the 2006 census and updated statistical techniques. A newer version of the above table is on page 54 of the report.
- In the New Zealand education system, "decile" is a key measure of socioeconomic status used to target funding and support schools.
