= Barbara Kelly (disambiguation) =

Barbara Kelly (1924–2007) was a Canadian-born actress and television panellist.

Barbara Kelly may also refer to:

- Dame Barbara Kelly (public servant) (born 1940), Scottish public servant
- Barbara L. Kelly (born 1966), Scottish-Irish musicologist
- Barbara Kelly (linguist) (1968–2022), Australian linguist

== See also ==
- Barbara Kelley (1920–1998), British police officer
