= Keith Allan (linguist) =

Australian linguist (born 1943)

- Born: 27 March 1943 (age 83); London, England, UK
- Occupation: Emeritus Professor of Linguistics
- Employer: Monash University

Keith Allan, FAHA (born 27 March 1943) is an Australian linguist and Emeritus Professor at Monash University.

Allan sees language as a form of social interactive behaviour and believes this to be an important consideration in any thorough account of meaning in natural language. While he is interested in all aspects of meaning in language, his main interests are semantics, pragmatics, linguistic meta-theory and the history and philosophy of linguistics.

== Biography ==
=== Early life ===
After schooling in London, Allan went to do drama at University of Leeds, but once there, took up linguistics instead, receiving a BA (Hons) in 1964. From Leeds, he went to Ghana and then to the University of Edinburgh as a research associate where he completed an MLitt in 1970 and a Ph.D. presenting the thesis "Singularity and plurality in English noun phrases: a study in grammar and pragmatics". After three years as a lecturer in the English language at Ahmadu Bello University in Nigeria, he returned to the UK as a lecturer in linguistics at the University of Essex. Then after three more years at the University of Nairobi in Kenya, he signed up for a doctorate at Edinburgh on NP countability, receiving his PhD in 1978. He arrived at Monash University in 1978, where – but for a year in Tucson at the University of Arizona and a few odd months elsewhere – he has stayed until his retirement in 2011.

=== Career ===
Currently the co-editor of Australian Journal of Linguistics with Jean Mulder, Allan has published articles in refereed journals, books and conference proceedings. He was semantics editor for both editions of the International Encyclopedia of Linguistics, as well as section editor for "Logical and Lexical Semantics" in the Encyclopedia of Language and Linguistics. He also edited the 2001 and 2006 conference proceedings for the Australian Linguistic Society.

In 2003, Allan received the Centenary Medal "For service to Australian society and the humanities in linguistics and philology".

In the early years of Open Learning Australia, Allan helped develop some distance education modules at both undergraduate and MA level. At this time too, he made significant contributions to the distance education modules for the MA in Applied Linguistics at Monash University, revising several modules in later years for online delivery.

== Selected publications ==
=== Journal articles ===
- Allan, Keith (1977). "Classifiers". Language. 53 (2): 285–311. doi:10.2307/413103. JSTOR 413103.
- Allan, Keith (1980). "Nouns and countability". Language. 56 (3): 541–567. doi:10.2307/414449. JSTOR 414449.
- Allan, Keith (1987). "Hierarchies and the choice of left conjuncts (with particular attention to English)". Journal of Linguistics. 23: 51–77. doi:10.1017/S0022226700011038. S2CID 145383896.
- Allan, Keith (1995). "The anthropocentricity of the English word(s) back". Cognitive Linguistics. 6: 11–31. doi:10.1515/cogl.1995.6.1.11. S2CID 144263819.
- Allan, Keith (2003). "Linguistic metatheory". Language Sciences. 25 (6): 533–560. doi:10.1016/S0388-0001(03)00032-9.
- Allan, Keith (2004). "Aristotle's footprints in the linguist's garden". Language Sciences. 26 (4): 317–342. doi:10.1016/j.langsci.2003.05.001.
- Allan, Keith (2006). "Clause-type, primary illocution, and mood-like operators in English". Language Sciences. 28: 1–50. doi:10.1016/j.langsci.2004.12.001.
- Allan, Keith (2009). "The connotations of English colour terms: Colour-based X-phemisms". Journal of Pragmatics. 41 (3): 626–637. doi:10.1016/j.pragma.2008.06.004.

=== Books ===
- Allan, Keith (1986). Linguistic meaning. London: Routledge & Kegan Paul. ISBN 0-7102-0699-2.
- Allan, Keith; Burridge, Kate (1991). Euphemism and dysphemism: Language used as shield and weapon. Oxford: Oxford University Press. ISBN 0-19-506622-7.
- Allan, Keith (2001). Natural language semantics. Oxford: Blackwell. pp. xix, 528. ISBN 0-631-19297-2.
- Allan, Keith; Burridge, Kate (2006). Forbidden words: Taboo and the censoring of language. Cambridge: Cambridge University Press. ISBN 0-521-52564-0.
- Allan, Keith (2007). The western classical tradition in linguistics. London: Equinox. ISBN 978-1-904768-96-8.
- Allan, Keith; Bradshaw, Julie; Burridge, Kate; Finch, Geoffrey; Heydon, Georgina (2010). The English language and linguistics companion. Hampshire: Palgrave Macmillan. ISBN 978-1-4039-8971-0.
