= Kate Burridge =

Australian linguistics scholar

Kathryn "Kate" Burridge FASSA FAHA is a prominent Australian linguist specialising in the Germanic languages. Burridge currently occupies the Chair of Linguistics in the School of Languages, Literatures, Cultures and Linguistics at Monash University.

== Career ==
Burridge earned her PhD at the University College London in 1983 with a dissertation entitled, Some aspects of syntactic change in Germanic, with particular reference to Dutch.

Besides her research on Pennsylvania Dutch-speaking communities in Canada and grammatical change in Germanic languages, she has written influential works on the nature of euphemism and dysphemism, linguistic taboo, and on English grammatical structure in general.

Burridge is a regular presenter of language segments on ABC Radio. She appeared weekly as a panellist on ABC TV's Can We Help?, and has also appeared on The Einstein Factor.

== Honors and distinctions ==
She was elected a Fellow of the Australian Academy of the Humanities in 1998 and Fellow of the Academy of the Social Sciences in Australia in 2020.

She is a member of the editorial board of the Australian Journal of Linguistics.

== Selected works ==
=== Monographs ===
- Burridge, Kathryn & Eldon D. Weber (1989). Pennsylvania-German dialect : a localized study within a part of former Waterloo County, Ontario. Waterloo, Ontario: Pennsylvania German Folklore Society of Ontario. ISBN 978-0-920038-09-3
- "Euphemism and Dysphemism: Language Used as Shield and Weapon" (1991, Oxford University Press) – co-authored with Keith Allan. ISBN 978-0-19-506622-7
- "Diachronic Studies on the Languages of the Anabaptists" (1992, Universittsverlag Brockmeyer) – co-edited with Werner Enninger. ISBN 978-3-8196-0054-8
- "Syntactic Change in Germanic" (1993, John Benjamins).
- "Canada – Australia: Towards a Centenary of Partnership" (1997, Carlton Uni Press) – co-edited with Lois Foster and Gerry Turcotte.
- "English in Australia and New Zealand – An Introduction to its Structure, History and Use" (1998, Oxford University Press) – co-authored with Jean Mulder.
- "Introducing English Grammar" (2000, Edward Arnold) – co-authored with Kersti Börjars.
- "Blooming English: Observations on the roots, cultivation and hybrids of the English Language" (2004, Cambridge University Press; published 2002 by ABC Books).
- "Weeds in the Garden of Words: further observations on the tangled history of the English language" (2005, Cambridge University Press; published 2004 by ABC Books).
- "Forbidden Words: Taboo and the Censoring of Language" (2006, Cambridge: Cambridge University Press) – co-authored with Keith Allan.

=== Book reviews ===
Year	Review article	Work(s) reviewed
2021	Burridge, Kate (January–February 2021). "Camouflaging the cussword : exploring Australian slang". Australian Book Review. 428: 56–57.	Laugesen, Amanda. Rooted : an Australian history of bad language. NewSouth.
