= Demographics of New Zealand =

- Population pyramid of New Zealand in 2023
- Population: 5,324,700
  - Year: 2023 (Stats NZ estimate)
- Density: 19.9/km^{2} (51.5/sq mi)
- Growth rate: 2.1% (Stats NZ projection)
- Birth rate: 11.4 per 1000 pop. (2022)
- Death rate: 5.5 per 1000 pop. (2022)
- Life expectancy
  - male: 80.3 years
  - female: 83.7 years
- Fertility rate: 1.56 births per woman (2023)
- Infant mortality: 3.53 per 1000 live births (2023)
- Net migration rate: 14.72 per 1000 pop.
- Immigrant share: 28.2% (2024)

Age structure
- 0–14 years: ▼17.9% (2025 est.)
- 15–64 years: ▼64.5% (2025 est.)
- 65 and over: ▲17.6% (2025 est.)

Sex ratio
- Total: 0.97 males/female
- Under 15: 1.05 males/female
- 15–64 years: 0.97 males/female
- 65 and over: 0.87 males/female

Nationality
- Nationality: New Zealander
- Major ethnic: European 67.8%
- Minor ethnic: Māori 17.8%; Asian 17.3%; Pacific peoples 8.9%; (Note: When completing the census people could select more than one ethnic group. The proportions of people adding up to each ethnic group do not therefore add up to 100 percent.)

Language
- Official: English; Māori; New Zealand Sign Language
- Spoken: English 95.37%; Chinese (all variants) 4.42%; Te Reo Māori (all dialects) 3.96%; Gagana Sāmoa 2.17%; Hindi 1.48%; French 1.17%; Tagalog 0.97%; New Zealand Sign Language 0.5%

The demographics of New Zealand encompass the gender, ethnic, religious, geographic, and economic backgrounds of the 5.3 million people living in New Zealand. New Zealanders predominantly live in urban areas on the North Island. The five largest cities are Auckland, Wellington, Christchurch, Hamilton, and Tauranga. Few New Zealanders live on New Zealand's smaller islands. Waiheke Island (near Auckland) is by far the most populated smaller island with 9,360 residents, while Great Barrier Island, the Chatham and Pitt Islands, and Stewart Island each have populations below 1,000. New Zealand is part of a realm and most people born in the realm's external territories of Tokelau, the Ross Dependency, the Cook Islands and Niue are entitled to New Zealand passports.

As of the 2018 census, the majority of New Zealand's population is of European descent (70 percent; often referred to as Pākehā), with the indigenous Māori being the largest minority (16.5 percent), followed by Asians (15.3 percent), and non-Māori Pacific Islanders known collectively as Pasifika (9.0 percent). This is reflected in immigration, with most new migrants coming from Britain and Ireland, although the numbers from Asia in particular are increasing. Auckland is the most ethnically diverse region in New Zealand with 53.5 percent identifying as Europeans, 28.2 percent as Asian, 11.5 percent as Māori, 15.5 percent as Pasifika, and 2.3 percent as Middle Eastern, Latin American or African (MELAA). New Zealand is considered by some to be unique among Western countries for its high levels of ethnic intermarriage, which has historically been viewed with tolerance. According to a 2006 study, Māori have on average roughly 43% European ancestry, although the notion of being "mixed-race" is uncommon.

English, Māori, and New Zealand Sign Language are the official languages, with English being predominant and understood by the vast majority of Māori speakers. Significant minorities speak Chinese, Samoan, Hindi, French, and Tagalog. New Zealand English is mostly non-rhotic, but has distinct rhotic dialects as well. Rhoticity is widespread among Pasifika and Māori and is becoming increasingly common across the upper North Island. The closest English dialect to non-rhotic New Zealand English is Australian English, but they have several key distinctions, such as the New Zealand centralisation of the short i. The Māori language has undergone a process of revitalisation and is spoken by 4 percent of the population. New Zealand has an adult literacy rate of 99 percent and over half of the population aged 15–29 hold a tertiary qualification. In the adult population 14.2 percent have a bachelor's degree or higher, 30.4 percent have some form of secondary qualification as their highest qualification and 22.4 percent have no formal qualification. As at the 2018 census, 37 percent of the population identify as Christians, with Hinduism and Buddhism being the largest minority religions; almost half of the population (48.5 percent) is irreligious.

== Terminology ==
While the demonym for a New Zealand citizen is New Zealander, the informal "Kiwi" is commonly used both internationally and by locals. The name derives from the kiwi, a native flightless bird, which is the national symbol of New Zealand. The Māori loanword "Pākehā" usually refers to New Zealanders of European descent, although some reject this appellation, and some Māori use it to refer to all non-Polynesian New Zealanders. Most people born in New Zealand or one of the realm's external territories (Tokelau, the Ross Dependency, the Cook Islands and Niue) before 2006 are New Zealand citizens. Further conditions apply for those born from 2006 onwards. (Note: A person born on or after 1 January 2006 acquires New Zealand citizenship at birth only if at least one parent is a New Zealand citizen or permanent resident. People born on or before 31 December 2005 acquired citizenship at birth (jus soli).)

== Population size and distribution ==
Relative population map

Total New Zealand population (wikidata:Q664) = 5,307,800 (2024 estimation)
(WD = Wikidata page)

[Hide/show regional council populations]
	New Zealand	pop.	year
1	Auckland Region	1,816,000	2025^{WD}
2	Bay of Plenty Region	351,500	2025^{WD}
3	Canterbury Region	698,200	2025^{WD}
4	Chatham Islands Council	620	2025^{WD}
5	Gisborne District	52,700	2025^{WD}
6	Hawke's Bay	179,700	2025^{WD}
7	Manawatū-Whanganui	260,700	2025^{WD}
8	Marlborough District	50,800	2025^{WD}
9	Nelson Region	54,300	2025^{WD}
10	Northland Region	201,100	2025^{WD}
11	Otago	253,900	2025^{WD}
12	Southland Region	104,800	2025^{WD}
13	Taranaki	130,300	2025^{WD}
14	Tasman District	59,900	2025^{WD}
15	Waikato	532,100	2025^{WD}
16	Wellington Region	543,400	2025^{WD}
17	West Coast Region	34,700	2025^{WD}

The 2018 census enumerated a resident population of 4,699,755 – a 10.8 percent increase over the population recorded in the 2013 census.

View source data.

As of November 2026, the total population has risen to an 5,360,970 (estimated by extrapolation). The population is increasing at a rate of 1.4–2.0 percent per year. In May 2020, Statistics New Zealand reported that New Zealand's population had climbed above 5 million people in March 2020; in September 2020, this was revised six months earlier to September 2019 when population estimates were rebased to the 2018 census.

The median child birthing age was 30 and the total fertility rate is 2.1 births per woman in 2010. In Māori populations the median age is 26 and fertility rate 2.8. In 2010 the age-standardised mortality rate was 3.8 deaths per 1000 (down from 4.8 in 2000) and the infant mortality rate for the total population was 5.1 deaths per 1000 live births. The life expectancy of a New Zealand child born in 2021-23 was 83.7 years for females, and 80.3 years for males, which is among the highest in the world. Life expectancy at birth is forecast to increase from 80 years to 85 years in 2050 and infant mortality is expected to decline. In 2050 the median age is forecast to rise from 36 years to 43 years and the percentage of people 60 years of age and older rising from 18 percent to 29 percent. (Note: By 2036 the number of people aged 65 and over is projected to increase by 77 percent over 2016. One in 4.5 will be aged 65 and over.) During early migration in 1858, New Zealand had 131 males for every 100 females, but following changes in migration patterns and the modern longevity advantage of women, females came to outnumber males in 1971. As of 2012 there are 0.99 males per female, with males dominating under 15 years and females dominating in the 65 years or older range.

View source data.

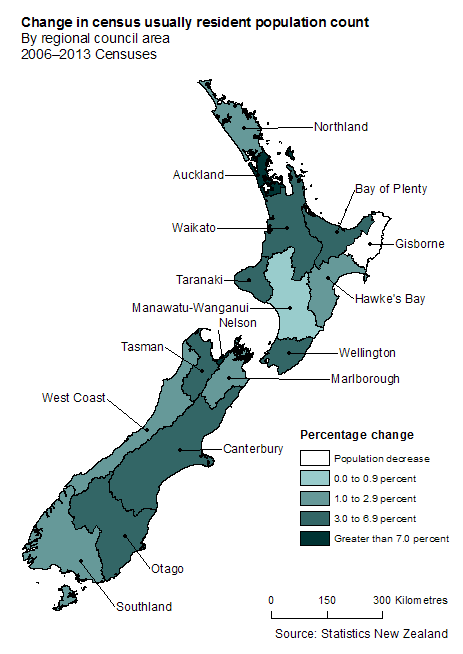
Change in population by region in New Zealand based on the 2006–2013 censuses

=== Age structure ===
Population Estimates by Sex and Age Group (01.VII.2021) (Provisional) (Because of rounding, totals are not in all cases the sum of the respective components.):

Age group	Male	Female	Total	%
Total	2 542 600	2 580 000	5 122 600	100
0–4	156 710	148 800	305 510	5.96
5–9	167 260	158 310	325 570	6.36
10–14	173 620	163 920	337 540	6.59
15–19	161 330	153 550	314 880	6.15
20–24	172 020	161 240	333 260	6.51
25–29	190 640	181 390	372 030	7.26
30–34	191 640	192 470	384 110	7.50
35–39	168 840	172 260	341 110	6.66
40–44	154 820	157 780	312 600	6.10
45–49	158 830	164 650	323 490	6.31
50–54	161 590	169 610	331 200	6.47
55–59	157 610	166 540	324 150	6.33
60–64	144 220	153 870	298 090	5.82
65-69	122 810	130 780	253 590	4.95
70-74	106 650	112 880	219 540	4.29
75-79	71 690	79 510	151 200	2.95
80-84	46 770	56 990	103 760	2.03
85-89	23 540	32 880	56 420	1.10
90+	12 010	22 570	34 580	0.68
Age group	Male	Female	Total	Percent
0–14	497 590	471 030	968 620	18.91
15–64	1 661 540	1 673 360	3 334 900	65.10
65+	383 470	435 610	819 080	15.99

Population pyramid of New Zealand from 1950 to 2020

The age structure of New Zealand is getting increasingly older. Due to undergoing the demographic transition from a 'pre-industrial' age structure to a 'post-industrial' age structure, the country has a sub-replacement fertility rate which is consequently leading to an older population and more evenly balanced population pyramid.

The average age of the citizen has gone from 25.8 years old in 1965 to 38 in 2020 and is projected to rise to 43.7 years old in 2050. The population of 90 year olds is also expected to rise dramatically, in the 1930s there were approximately 1,000 90+ year olds, in 2016 the number had risen to 29,000, in 2030 it is expected to exceed 50,000 and by the 2060s it is to rise above 180,000 people.

=== Population density ===
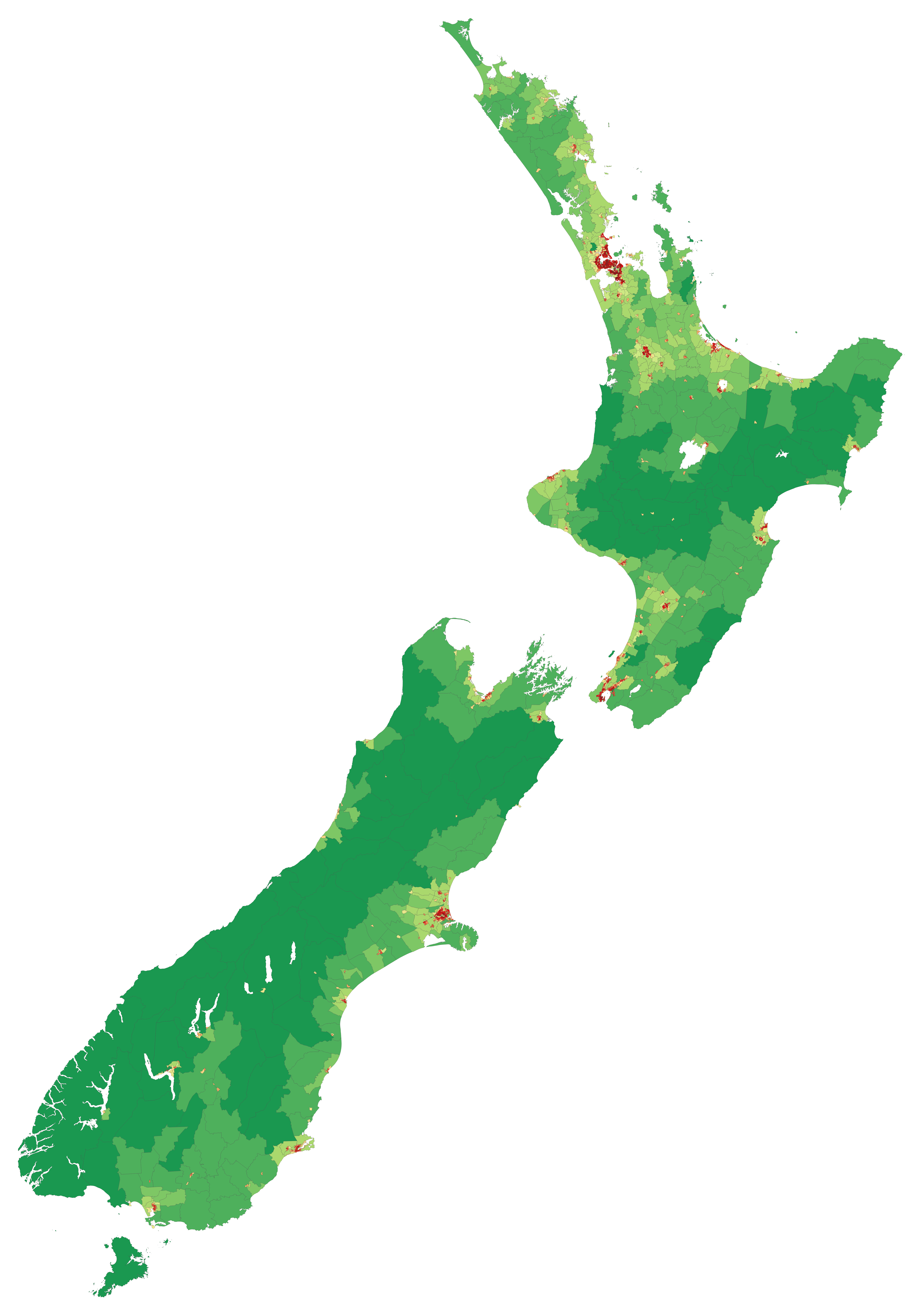
Population density as of the 2023 census Legend Fewer than 1 person per square km 1 person per square km and above 10 people per square km and above 250 people per square km and above 1000 people per square km and above 4000 people per square km and above

New Zealand's population density is relatively low, at 19.9 per square kilometre (51.5 per square mile) (June 2025 estimate). The vast majority of the population live on the main North and South Islands, with New Zealand's major inhabited smaller islands being Waiheke Island (9,360), the Chatham and Pitt Islands (620), and Stewart Island (381). Over three-quarters of the population (76.4%) live in the North Island, with one-third of the total population (34.1%) living in the Auckland Region. Most Māori live in the North Island (86.0 percent), although less than a quarter (23.8 percent) live in Auckland.

New Zealand is a predominantly urban country, with 84.5 percent of the population living in an urban area. About 65.0 percent of the population live in the 20 main urban areas (population of 30,000 or more) and 44.3 percent live in the four largest cities of Auckland, Christchurch, Wellington, and Hamilton.

Approximately 14 percent of the population live in four different categories of rural areas as defined by Statistics New Zealand. About 18 percent of the rural population live in areas that have a high urban influence (roughly 12.9 people per square kilometre), many working in the main urban area. Rural areas with moderate urban influence and a population density of about 6.5 people per square kilometre account for 26 percent of the rural population. Areas with low urban influence where the majority of the residents work in the rural area house approximately 42 percent of the rural population. Remote rural areas with a density of less than 1 person per square kilometre account for about 14 percent of the rural population.

Before local government reforms in the late 1980s, a borough council with more than 20,000 people could be proclaimed a city. The boundaries of councils tended to follow the edge of the built-up area, so there was little difference between the urban area and the local government area. In 1989, all councils were consolidated into regional councils (top tier) and territorial authorities (second tier) which cover a much wider area and population than the old city councils. Today a territorial authority must have a predominantly urban population of at least 50,000 before it can be officially recognised as a city.

== Vital statistics ==
=== Vital statistics since 1883 ===
Notable events in New Zealand demography:

- 1945-1961 – Mid-20th-century baby boom

	Population (Note: For 1920–2000, population in the table means population on 1 January on the year. For 1991 onwards, population 31 December.)	Live births	Deaths	Natural change	Crude birth rate (per 1,000)	Crude death rate (per 1,000)	Natural change (per 1,000)	Crude Migration change (per 1,000)	Total fertility rate (Note: In fertility rates, 2.1 and above is a stable population and have been marked blue, 2 and below leads to an ageing population with the result that the population reduces.)
1883	529,292	19,202	6,061	13,141	36.3	11.5	24.8		4.86
1884	552,590	19,846	5,740	14,106	35.9	10.4	25.5	17.4	4.81
1885	573,362	19,693	6,081	13,612	34.3	10.6	23.7	13.0	4.60
1886	582,117	19,299	6,135	13,164	33.2	10.5	22.6	-7.7	4.44
1887	596,374	19,135	6,137	12,998	32.1	10.3	21.8	2.2	4.30
1888	605,374	18,902	5,708	13,194	31.2	9.4	21.8	-7.0	4.18
1889	612,716	18,457	5,784	12,673	30.1	9.4	20.7	-8.8	4.03
1890	620,780	18,278	5,994	12,284	29.4	9.7	19.8	-6.9	3.94
1891	629,783	18,273	6,518	11,755	29.0	10.3	18.7	-4.4	3.89
1892	642,245	17,876	6,459	11,417	27.8	10.1	17.8	1.7	3.73
1893	661,349	18,187	6,767	11,420	27.5	10.2	17.3	12.0	3.68
1894	679,196	18,528	6,918	11,610	27.3	10.2	17.1	9.4	3.66
1895	692,417	18,546	6,863	11,683	26.8	9.9	16.9	2.3	3.59
1896	706,846	18,612	6,432	12,180	26.3	9.1	17.2	3.2	3.53
1897	721,069	18,737	6,595	12,142	26.0	9.1	16.8	2.9	3.48
1898	736,260	18,955	7,244	11,711	25.7	9.8	15.9	4.8	3.45
1899	749,984	18,835	7,680	11,155	25.1	10.2	14.9	3.5	3.37
1900	763,594	19,546	7,200	12,346	25.6	9.4	16.2	1.7	3.43
1901	816,000	20,491	7,634	12,857	25.1	9.3	15.8	50.7	3.54
1902	852,000	20,655	8,375	12,280	24.2	9.8	14.4	28.4	3.47
1903	873,000	21,829	8,528	13,301	25.0	9.7	15.2	10.2	3.57
1904	896,000	22,766	8,087	14,679	25.4	9.0	16.4	11.1	3.61
1905	920,000	23,682	8,061	15,621	25.7	8.7	16.9	10.4	3.65
1906	944,000	24,252	8,339	15,913	25.7	8.8	16.8	9.1	3.63
1907	970,000	25,094	10,066	15,028	25.9	10.3	15.4	10.7	3.66
1908	996,000	25,940	9,043	16,897	26.0	9.0	16.9	11.3	3.68
1909	1,020,000	26,524	8,959	17,565	26.0	8.7	17.2	7.1	3.66
1910	1,040,000	25,984	9,639	16,345	24.9	9.2	15.7	2.4	3.51
1911	1,070,000	26,354	9,534	16,820	24.6	8.9	15.7	13.3	3.48
1912	1,090,000	27,508	9,214	18,294	25.2	8.4	16.7	2.9	3.55
1913	1,120,000	27,935	10,119	17,816	24.9	9.0	15.9	10.7	3.50
1914	1,140,000	28,338	10,148	18,190	24.9	8.9	15.9	1.9	3.48
1915	1,150,000	27,850	9,965	17,885	24.2	8.6	15.5	–7.2	3.39
1916	1,150,000	28,509	10,596	17,913	24.8	9.2	15.5	–15.6	3.48
1917	1,150,000	28,290	10,528	17,762	24.6	9.1	15.4	–15.6	3.44
1918	1,170,000	25,860	16,364	9,496	22.1	13.9	8.12	2.0	3.14
1919	1,200,000	24,483	10,808	13,675	20.4	9.0	11.4	17.5	2.87
1920	1,240,000	29,921	12,109	17,812	24.1	9.7	14.3	21.9	3.36
1921	1,270,000	29,623	11,474	18,149	23.3	9.0	14.3	9.4	3.08
1922	1,300,000	30,448	11,874	18,574	23.4	9.1	14.3	8.9	3.08
1923	1,330,000	29,148	12,239	16,909	21.9	9.2	12.7	10.0	2.96
1924	1,350,000	29,260	11,540	17,720	21.7	8.6	13.1	1.7	2.93
1925	1,380,000	29,869	11,844	18,025	21.9	8.7	13.2	8.8	2.90
1926	1,410,000	29,904	12,517	17,387	21.4	9.0	12.4	9.0	2.88
1927	1,429,700	29,278	12,600	16,678	20.3	8.8	11.6	2.9	2.79
1928	1,450,400	28,938	12,860	16,078	19.8	8.8	11.0	0.7	2.70
1929	1,467,400	28,859	13,220	15,639	19.5	9.0	10.6	2.1	2.64
1930	1,486,100	28,822	13,145	15,677	19.3	8.8	10.5	3.4	2.60
1931	1,506,800	28,867	13,062	15,805	19.1	8.6	10.4	0.2	2.56
1932	1,522,800	27,535	12,875	14,660	18.0	8.4	9.6	-1.8	2.38
1933	1,534,700	27,204	12,862	14,342	17.7	8.3	9.3	-1.2	2.31
1934	1,547,100	27,220	13,810	13,410	17.5	8.9	8.6	-1.3	2.29
1935	1,558,400	27,150	13,664	13,486	17.4	8.7	8.6	-1.3	2.25
1936	1,569,700	28,395	14,658	13,737	18.0	9.3	8.7	0.8	2.30
1937	1,584,600	29,896	15,215	14,681	18.8	9.6	9.2	1.7	2.39
1938	1,601,800	30,845	16,874	13,971	19.2	10.5	8.7	1.6	2.44
1939	1,618,300	32,872	15,933	16,939	20.2	9.8	10.4	4.0	2.56
1940	1,641,600	36,945	15,875	21,070	22.6	9.7	12.9	-17.8	2.84
1941	1,633,600	39,170	17,047	22,123	24.0	10.4	13.6	-15.1	2.93
1942	1,631,200	37,818	18,117	19,701	23.1	11.1	12.1	-8.9	2.87
1943	1,636,400	34,684	17,122	17,562	21.2	10.4	10.7	-7.3	2.61
1944	1,642,000	38,037	17,049	20,988	22.9	10.3	12.7	8.2	2.85
1945	1,676,300	41,534	17,686	23,848	24.4	10.4	14.0	16.7	3.10
1946	1,727,800	47,524	17,720	29,804	27.1	10.1	17.0	13.9	3.45
1947	1,781,200	49,698	17,442	32,256	27.6	9.7	17.9	2.5	3.63
1948	1,817,500	49,062	17,285	31,777	26.7	9.4	17.3	2.7	3.57
1949	1,853,900	48,841	17,578	31,263	26.1	9.4	16.7	3.9	3.53
1950	1,892,100	49,331	18,084	31,247	25.8	9.5	16.4	2.4	3.55
1951	1,927,700	49,806	18,836	30,970	25.6	9.7	15.9	6.3	3.60
1952	1,970,500	51,846	18,896	32,950	26.0	9.5	16.5	11.0	3.67
1953	2,024,600	51,888	18,354	33,534	25.3	9.0	16.4	8.3	3.65
1954	2,074,700	54,055	18,876	35,179	25.8	9.0	16.8	4.3	3.78
1955	2,118,400	55,596	19,225	36,371	26.0	9.0	17.0	4.9	3.88
1956	2,164,800	56,531	19,696	36,835	25.8	9.0	16.8	3.7	3.98
1957	2,209,200	58,425	20,862	37,563	26.1	9.3	16.8	7.5	4.03
1958	2,262,800	60,556	20,301	40,255	26.5	8.9	17.6	5.9	4.11
1959	2,316,000	61,798	21,128	40,670	26.4	9.0	17.4	1.5	4.18
1960	2,359,700	62,779	20,892	41,887	26.4	8.8	17.6	1.0	4.24
1961	2,403,600	65,390	21,782	43,608	26.9	9.0	17.9	6.1	4.31
1962	2,461,300	65,014	22,081	42,933	26.1	8.9	17.3	4.8	4.19
1963	2,515,800	64,527	22,416	42,111	25.4	8.8	16.6	3.7	4.05
1964	2,566,900	62,302	22,861	39,441	24.0	8.8	15.2	4.3	3.80
1965	2,617,000	60,047	22,976	37,071	22.7	8.7	14.0	3.9	3.54
1966	2,663,800	60,003	23,778	36,225	22.3	8.8	13.5	4,3	3.41
1967	2,711,300	61,022	23,007	38,015	22.4	8.4	13.9	-1.5	3.35
1968	2,745,000	62,112	24,464	37,648	22.5	8.9	13.6	-3.4	3.34
1969	2,773,000	62,360	24,161	38,199	22.4	8.7	13.7	-2.5	3.28
1970	2,804,000	62,050	24,840	37,210	21.9	8.8	13.2	4.0	3.17
1971	2,852,100	64,460	24,309	40,151	22.4	8.5	14.0	2.3	3.18
1972	2,898,500	63,215	24,801	38,414	21.6	8.5	13.1	8.0	3.00
1973	2,959,700	60,727	25,312	35,415	20.3	8.5	11.8	10.2	2.76
1974	3,024,900	59,336	25,261	34,075	19.4	8.3	11.1	11.0	2.58
1975	3,091,900	56,639	25,114	31,525	18.2	8.1	10.1	6.7	2.37
1976	3,143,700	55,105	25,457	29,648	17.5	8.1	9.4	-3.1	2.27
1977	3,163,400	54,179	25,961	28,218	17.1	8.2	8.9	-8.0	2.21
1978	3,166,400	51,029	24,669	26,360	16.1	7.8	8.3	-8.7	2.07
1979	3,165,200	52,279	25,340	26,939	16.5	8.0	8.5	-8.9	2.12
1980	3,163,900	50,542	26,676	23,866	15.9	8.4	7.5	-3.5	2.03
1981	3,176,400	50,794	25,150	25,644	15.9	7.9	8.1	-2.4	2.01
1982	3,194,500	49,938	25,532	24,406	15.6	8.0	7.6	2.5	1.95
1983	3,226,800	50,474	25,991	24,483	15.6	8.0	7.5	4.3	1.92
1984	3,264,800	51,636	25,378	26,258	15.7	7.7	8.0	0.6	1.93
1985	3,293,000	51,798	27,480	24,318	15.7	8.3	7.4	-4.3	1.93
1986	3,303,100	52,824	27,045	25,779	16.0	8.2	7.8	-4.7	1.96
1987	3,313,500	55,254	27,419	27,835	16.6	8.2	8.4	0.2	2.03
1988	3,342,100	57,546	27,408	30,138	17.2	8.2	9.0	-8.1	2.10
1989	3,345,200	58,091	27,042	31,049	17.3	8.1	9.2	-1.8	2.12
1990	3,369,800	60,153	26,531	33,622	17.7	7.8	9.9	–2.7	2.18
1991	3,516,000	59,911	26,389	33,522	17.3	7.6	9.7	32.7	2.09
1992	3,552,200	59,166	27,115	32,051	16.7	7.7	9.1	1.2	2.06
1993	3,597,800	58,782	27,100	31,682	16.4	7.6	8.9	3.9	2.04
1994	3,648,300	57,321	26,953	30,368	15.8	7.4	8.4	5.6	1.98
1995	3,706,700	57,671	27,813	29,858	15.7	7.6	8.1	7.9	1.98
1996	3,762,300	57,280	28,255	29,025	15.3	7.6	7.8	7.2	1.96
1997	3,802,700	57,604	27,471	30,133	15.2	7.3	8.0	2.7	1.96
1998	3,829,200	55,349	26,206	29,143	14.5	6.9	7.6	-0.6	1.89
1999	3,851,100	57,053	28,122	28,931	14.9	7.3	7.5	-1.8	1.97
2000	3,873,100	56,605	26,660	29,945	14.7	6.9	7.8	-2.1	1.98
2001	3,916,200	55,800	27,825	27,972	14.36	7.16	7.20	3.9	1.97
2002	3,989,500	54,021	28,065	25,956	13.67	7.10	6.57	12.1	1.89
2003	4,061,600	56,136	28,011	28,125	13.94	6.95	6.99	11.1	1.93
2004	4,114,300	58,074	28,419	29,655	14.20	6.95	7.25	5.7	1.98
2005	4,161,000	57,744	27,033	30,711	13.96	6.54	7.42	3.9	1.97
2006	4,209,100	59,193	28,245	30,948	14.14	6.75	7.39	4.2	2.01
2007	4,245,700	64,044	28,521	35,520	15.15	6.75	8.40	0.3	2.18
2008	4,280,300	64,341	29,187	35,154	15.10	6.85	8.25	-0.1	2.19
2009	4,332,100	62,541	28,965	33,579	14.53	6.73	7.80	4.3	2.13
2010	4,373,900	63,897	28,437	35,457	14.68	6.53	8.15	1.5	2.17
2011	4,399,400	61,404	30,081	31,320	14.00	6.86	7.14	-1.3	2.09
2012	4,425,900	61,179	30,099	31,080	13.87	6.82	7.05	-1.0	2.10
2013	4,477,400	58,719	29,568	29,148	13.20	6.65	6.55	5.1	2.01
2014	4,564,400	57,243	31,062	26,181	12.68	6.88	5.80	13.6	1.92
2015	4,663,700	61,038	31,608	29,430	13.27	6.87	6.40	15.4	1.99
2016	4,767,600	59,430	31,179	28,251	12.65	6.64	6.01	16.3	1.87
2017	4,858,500	59,610	33,339	26,271	12.43	6.95	5.48	13.6	1.81
2018	4,941,200	58,020	33,222	24,798	11.76	6.73	5.03	12.0	1.71
2019	5,027,100	59,637	34,260	25,377	12.13	6.97	5.16	14.9	1.75
2020	5,081,400	57,573	32,613	24,960	11.33	6.40	4.93	7.6	1.61
2021	5,085,400	58,659	34,932	23,727	11.44	6.81	4.63	-2.1	1.64
2022	5,120,700	58,887	38,574	20,313	11.43	7.49	3.94	4.0	1.66
2023	5,263,100	56,955	37,884	19,071	11.04	7.35	3.70	28.8	1.57
2024	5,307,800	58,341	37,722	20,619	10.94	7.07	3.87	5.7	1.57
2025	5,342,000	57,705	37,491	20,214	10.84	7.04	3.80	2.6	1.55
2026									1.47 (e)

(e)=estimation

=== Current vital statistics ===
Period	Live births	Deaths	Natural increase
January - September 2025	43,086	28,182	+14,904
January - September 2026	41,706	29,370	+12,336
Difference	▼ –1,380 (-3.2%)	▲ +1,188 (+4.2%)	▼ –2,568

=== Total fertility rates ===
View source data.

==== By region ====
Regional total fertility rates, 2023

2023
Region	TFR
Gisborne	2.14
Northland	2.14
Hawke's Bay	1.95
Bay of Plenty	1.93
Taranaki	1.92
Waikato	1.89
Manawatū-Whanganui	1.83
Southland	1.75
West Coast	1.71
Marlborough	1.66
New Zealand	1.60
Tasman	1.57
Canterbury	1.53
Auckland	1.51
Nelson	1.40
Wellington	1.36
Otago	1.25

=== Life expectancy ===
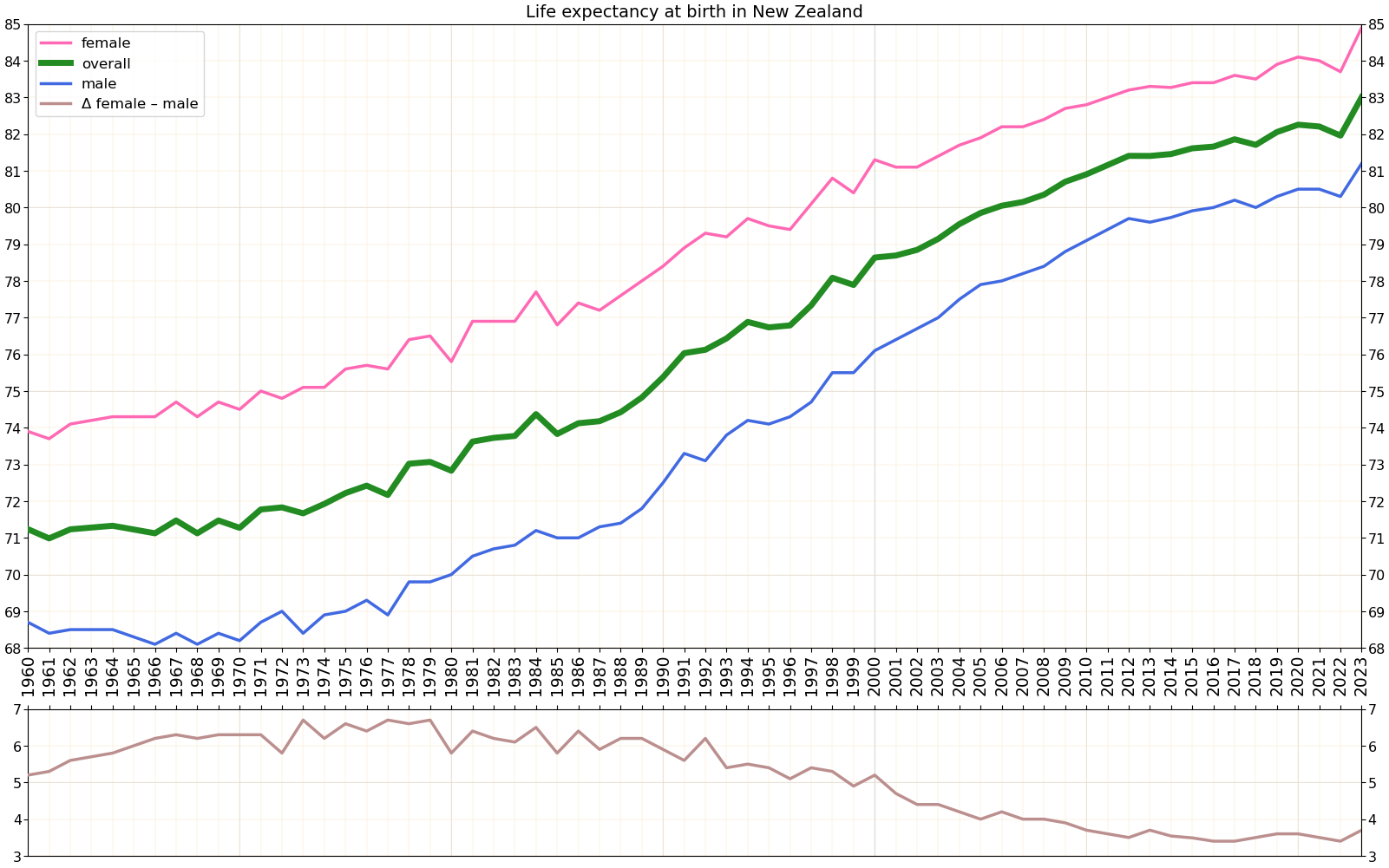
Life expectancy at birth in New Zealand

== Immigration ==
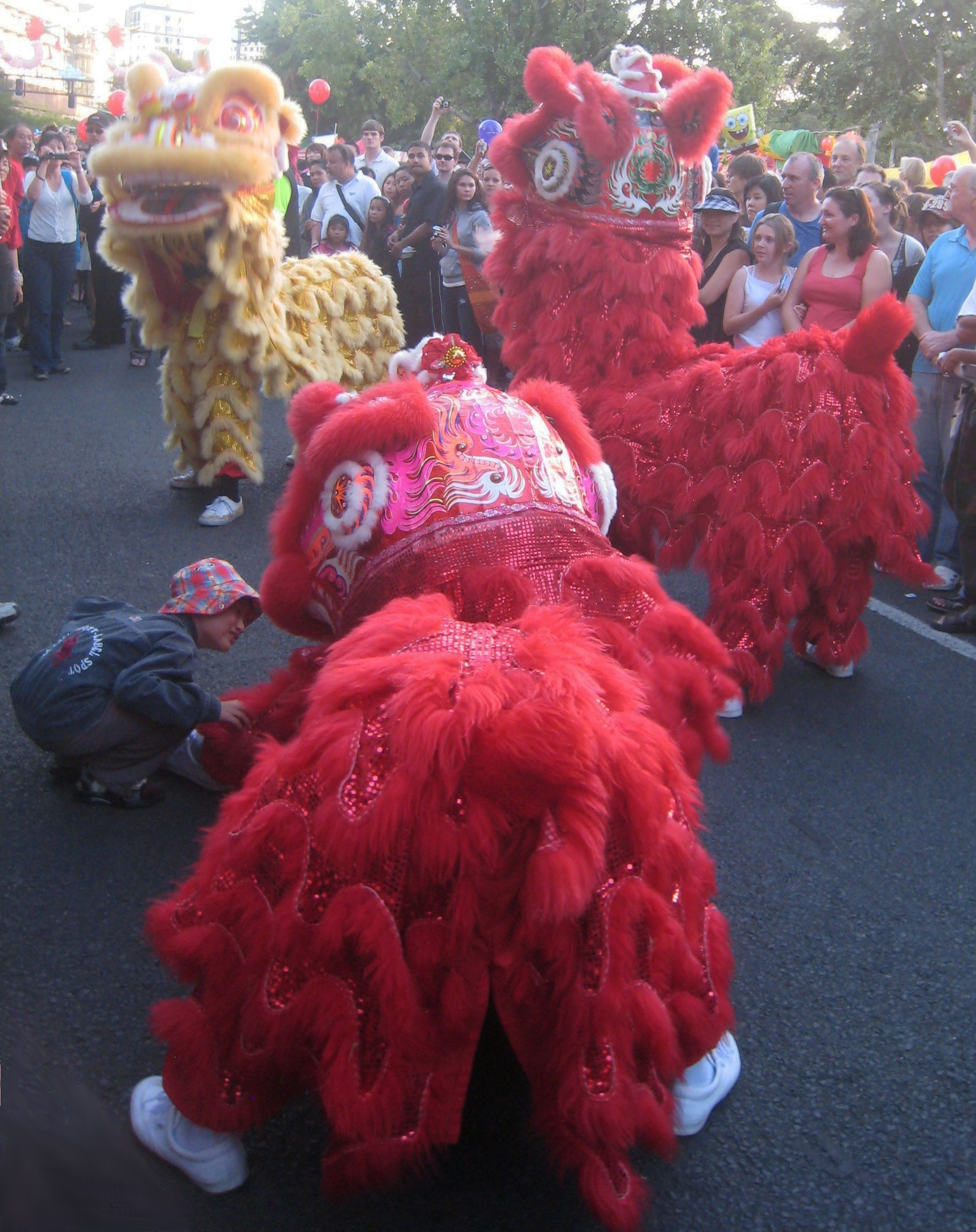
New Zealand's fastest growing ethnic groups are Asians. Here, lion dancers perform at the Auckland Lantern Festival.

Countries of birth of New Zealand residents, 2018 census
Country	Number	%
New Zealand	3,370,122	72.60
England	210,915	4.54
Mainland China	132,906	2.86
India	117,348	2.53
Australia	75,696	1.63
South Africa	71,382	1.54
Philippines	67,632	1.46
Fiji	62,310	1.34
Samoa	55,512	1.20
South Korea	30,975	0.67
United States	27,678	0.60
Tonga	26,856	0.58
Scotland	26,136	0.56
Malaysia	19,860	0.43
Netherlands	19,329	0.42
Germany	16,605	0.36
United Kingdom (nfd)	14,601	0.31
Sri Lanka	14,349	0.31
Japan	13,107	0.28
Canada	11,928	0.26
Cook Islands	11,925	0.26
Hong Kong	10,992	0.24
Ireland	10,494	0.23
Taiwan	10,440	0.22
Thailand	10,251	0.22
Other countries	202,548	4.36

East Polynesians were the first people to reach New Zealand about 1280, followed by the early European explorers, notably James Cook in 1769 who explored New Zealand three times and mapped the coastline. Following the Treaty of Waitangi in 1840 when the country became a British colony, immigrants were predominantly from Britain, Ireland and Australia. Due to restrictive policies, limitations were placed on non-European immigrants. During the gold rush period (1858–1880s) large number of young men came from California and Victoria to New Zealand goldfields. Apart from British, there were Irish, Germans, Scandinavians, Italians and many Chinese. The Chinese were sent special invitations by the Otago Chamber of Commerce in 1866. By 1873 they made up 40 percent of the diggers in Otago and 25 percent of the diggers in Westland. From 1900 there was also significant Dutch, Croatians, and Italian immigration together with indirect European immigration through Australia, North America, South America and South Africa. Following World War II, policies were relaxed and migrant diversity increased. In 2008–09, a target of 45,000 migrants was set by the New Zealand Immigration Service (plus a 5,000 tolerance).

At the 2018 census, 27.4 percent of people counted were not born in New Zealand, up from 25.2 percent in 2013. In 2018, over half (50.7 percent) of New Zealand's overseas-born population lived in the Auckland Region, including 70 percent of the country's Pacific Island-born population, 61.5 percent of its Asian-born population, and 52 percent of its Middle Eastern and African- born population. In the late 2000s, Asia overtook the British Isles as the largest source of overseas migrants; in 2013 around 32 percent of overseas-born New Zealand residents were born in Asia (mainly China, India, the Philippines and South Korea) compared to 26 percent born in the UK and Ireland. The number of fee-paying international students increased sharply in the late 1990s, with more than 20,000 studying in public tertiary institutions in 2002.

To be eligible for entry under the skilled migrant plan applicants are assessed by an approved doctor for good health, provide a police certificate to prove good character and speak sufficient English. Migrants working in some occupations (mainly health) must be registered with the appropriate profession body before they can work within that area. Skilled migrants are assessed by Immigration New Zealand and applicants that they believe will contribute are issued with a residential visa, while those with potential are issued with a work to resident visa. Under the work to residency process applicants are given a temporary work permit for two years and are then eligible to apply for residency. Applicants with a job offer from an accredited New Zealand employer, cultural or sporting talent, looking for work where there has been a long-term skill shortage or to establish a business can apply for work to residency.

While most New Zealanders live in New Zealand, there is also a significant diaspora abroad, estimated as of 2001 at over 460,000 or 14 percent of the international total of New Zealand-born. Of these, 360,000, over three-quarters of the New Zealand-born population residing outside of New Zealand, live in Australia. Other communities of New Zealanders abroad are concentrated in other English-speaking countries, specifically the United Kingdom, the United States and Canada, with smaller numbers located elsewhere. Nearly one quarter of New Zealand's highly skilled workers live overseas, mostly in Australia and Britain, more than any other developed nation. However many educated professionals from Europe and lesser developed countries have recently migrated to New Zealand. A common pathway for New Zealanders to move to the UK is through a job offer via the Tier 2 (General) visa, which grants a 3-year initial stay in the country and can later be extended with three more years. After 5 years the person can apply for permanent residency. Another popular option is the UK Working Holiday visa, also known as "Youth Mobility Scheme" (YMS), which grants New Zealanders 2-year rights to live and work in the UK.

=== Migration data of New Zealand, 2001–present ===
New Zealand Annual Migration Data
Year	Migrant Arrivals	Migrant Departures	Net Migration
2001	114,597	84,332	30,265
2002	134,046	73,255	60,791
2003	120,591	79,175	41,416
2004	103,496	89,356	14,140
2005	103,982	92,716	11,266
2006	110,687	93,974	16,713
2007	113,450	102,413	11,037
2008	119,994	107,723	12,271
2009	108,265	89,996	18,269
2010	100,499	100,776	-277
2011	100,206	116,350	-16,144
2012	101,762	112,170	-10,408
2013	110,282	92,991	17,291
2014	128,180	80,767	47,413
2015	140,125	80,316	59,809
2016	143,124	80,235	62,889
2017	140,102	86,822	53,280
2018	139,014	89,447	49,567
2019	165,742	93,154	72,588
2020	91,444	54,600	36,844
2021	55,459	70,409	-14,950
2022	119,440	94,539	24,901
2023	244,763	110,319	134,445

== Ethnicity ==
Ethnic groups according to the 2023 census

Age group composition

European
Mixed European-Māori
Māori
Asian
Pasifika
MELAA
Other
Multiple

New Zealand is a multiethnic society, and home to people of many different national origins. Originally composed solely of the Māori who arrived in the thirteenth century, the ethnic makeup of the population later became dominated by New Zealanders of European descent. In the nineteenth century, European settlers brought diseases for which the Māori had no immunity. By the 1890s, the Māori population was approximately 40 percent of its size pre-contact. The Māori population increased during the twentieth century, though it remains a minority. The 1961 New Zealand census recorded that the population was 92 percent European and 7 percent Māori, with Asian and Pasifika minorities sharing the remaining 1 percent.

At the census in 2023, 67.8 percent or residents identified as European, 17.8 percent as Māori, 17.3 percent as Asian, 8.9 percent as Pasifika, and 1.9 percent as Middle-Eastern, Latin American, and African (MELAA). Statistics New Zealand allows people to choose multiple ethnicities and reports ethnic data based on total responses, therefore ethnicities add up to more than 100%. For legacy systems which can only accept one ethnicity, people are usually allocated to a single ethnicity based on a pre-determined priority order, with Māori given highest priority and European given lowest priority.

Most New Zealanders are of English, Scottish, and Irish ancestry, with smaller percentages of other European ancestries, such as Dutch, Dalmatian, French, German and Scandinavian. According to Massey University sociologist Paul Spoonley, ethnic intermarriage has consistently been very common in New Zealand since colonisation. Unlike the United States, New Zealand has never prohibited interracial marriages; they have in fact been historically encouraged by many. In 2015, more than half of Maori, or 53.5 per cent, and almost four in 10, or 37.2 per cent of Pasifika, identified with two or more ethnic groups.

All major ethnic groups except European increased when compared with the 2013 census, in which 74 percent identified as European, 14.6 percent as Māori, 11.8 percent as Asian, and 7.4 percent of Pasifika origin. Heightened immigration from Asia and the Pacific, and higher fertility rates amongst Māori and Pasifika, have resulted in the population of Māori, Asian and Pasifika descent growing at a higher rate than those of European descent. Moreover, non-European ethnic groups make up a greater proportion of younger people, whereas European ethnic groups make up a large proportion of older people due to historic immigration trends and lower life expectancy in Māori and Pasifika ethnic groups. For instance, in 2013, the population aged under 15 years was 67 percent European, 27 percent Māori, 14 percent Pacific, 16 percent Asian, and 2 percent MELAA, while the population aged 65 years and older consisted of 86 percent European, 7 percent Māori, 6 percent Asian and 3 percent Pacific.

Auckland was the most diverse region as of the 2023 census, with 49.8 percent identifying as European, 12.3 percent as Māori, 16.6 percent as Pasifika, 31.3 percent as Asian, and 2.7 percent as MELAA. West Coast was the least diverse region, with 89.7 percent identifying as European, 13.5 percent as Māori, 1.6 percent as Pasifika, 4.0 percent as Asian, and 0.5 percent as MELAA.

There was significant public discussion about usage of the term "New Zealander" during the months leading up to the 2006 census. The number of people identifying with this term increased from approximately 80,000 (2.4 percent) in 2001 to just under 430,000 people (11.1 percent) in 2006. The European grouping significantly decreased from 80.0 percent of the population in 2001 to 67.6 percent in 2006, however, this is broadly proportional to the large increase in "New Zealanders". The number of people identifying as a "New Zealander" dropped back to under 66,000 in 2013, and further declined to about 45,300 in 2018.

Statistics New Zealand has not released official statistical counts of Māori iwi (tribes) from the 2018 census due to a low response rate. As last recorded in the 2013 census, the largest iwi is Ngāpuhi with 125,601 people (or 18.8 percent of people of Māori descent). Between 2006 and 2013 the number of people of Māori descent stating Ngāpuhi as their iwi increased by 3,390 people (2.8 percent). The second-largest was Ngāti Porou, with 71,049 people (down 1.2 percent from 2006). Ngāi Tahu was the largest in the South Island and the third-largest overall, with a count of 54,819 people (an increase of 11.4 percent from 2006). A total of 110,928 people (or 18.5 percent) of Māori descent did not know their iwi (an increase of 8.4 percent compared with 2006). A group of Māori migrated to Rēkohu, now known as the Chatham Islands, where they developed their distinct Moriori culture. The Moriori population was decimated, first, by disease brought by European sealers and whalers and, second, by Taranaki Māori, with only 101 surviving in 1862 and the last known full-blooded Moriori dying in 1933. The number of people identifying as having Moriori ancestry increased from 105 in 1991 to 945 in 2006, but decreased to 738 in 2013.

Ethnicity	2006 census		2013 census		2018 census		2023 census	
Ethnicity	Number	%	Number	%	Number	%	Number	%
European	2,609,589	67.6	2,969,391	74.0	3,297,864	70.2	3,383,742	67.8
New Zealand European	2,381,076	61.7	2,727,009	68.0	3,013,440	64.1	3,099,858	62.1
British & Irish	100,668	2.6	105,765	2.6	121,986	2.6	122,571	2.5
South African European	21,609	0.6	28,656	0.7	37,155	0.8	48,930	1.0
Dutch	28,644	0.7	28,503	0.7	29,820	0.6	30,948	0.6
Australian	26,355	0.7	22,467	0.6	29,349	0.6	30,591	0.6
Māori	565,329	14.6	598,605	14.9	775,836	16.5	887,493	17.8
Asian	354,552	9.2	471,708	11.8	707,598	15.1	861,576	17.3
Indian	104,583	2.5	155,178	3.9	239,193	5.1	292,092	5.8
Chinese	147,570	3.6	171,411	4.3	247,770	5.3	279,039	5.6
Filipino	16,938	0.4	40,350	1.0	72,612	1.5	108,297	2.2
Korean	30,792	0.8	30,171	0.8	35,644	0.8	38,934	0.8
Pasifikas	265,974	6.9	295,941	7.4	381,642	8.1	442,632	8.9
Samoan	131,103	3.4	144,138	3.6	182,721	3.9	213,069	4.3
Tongan	50,481	1.3	60,333	1.5	82,389	1.8	97,824	2.0
Cook Islands Māori	56,895	1.5	61,077	1.5	80,532	1.7	94,176	1.9
Niuean	22,476	0.6	23,883	0.6	30,867	0.7	34,944	0.7
Fijian	9,861	0.3	14,445	0.4	19,722	0.4	25,038	0.5
Middle Eastern/Latin American/African	34,743	0.9	46,953	1.2	70,332	1.5	92,760	1.9
Other	430,881	11.2	67,752	1.7	58,053	1.2	56,133	1.1
New Zealander	429,429	11.1	65,973	1.6	45,330	1.0	42,684	0.9
Total people stated	3,860,163		4,011,399		4,699,755		4,993,923	
Not elsewhere included	167,784	4.2	230,646	5.4	0	0.0	0	0.0

The maps below (taken from 2013 census data) show the percentages of people in each census area unit identifying themselves as European, Māori, Asian, or Pacific Islander (as defined by Statistics New Zealand). As people could identify themselves with multiple groups, percentages are not cumulative.

European from 2006 to 2018

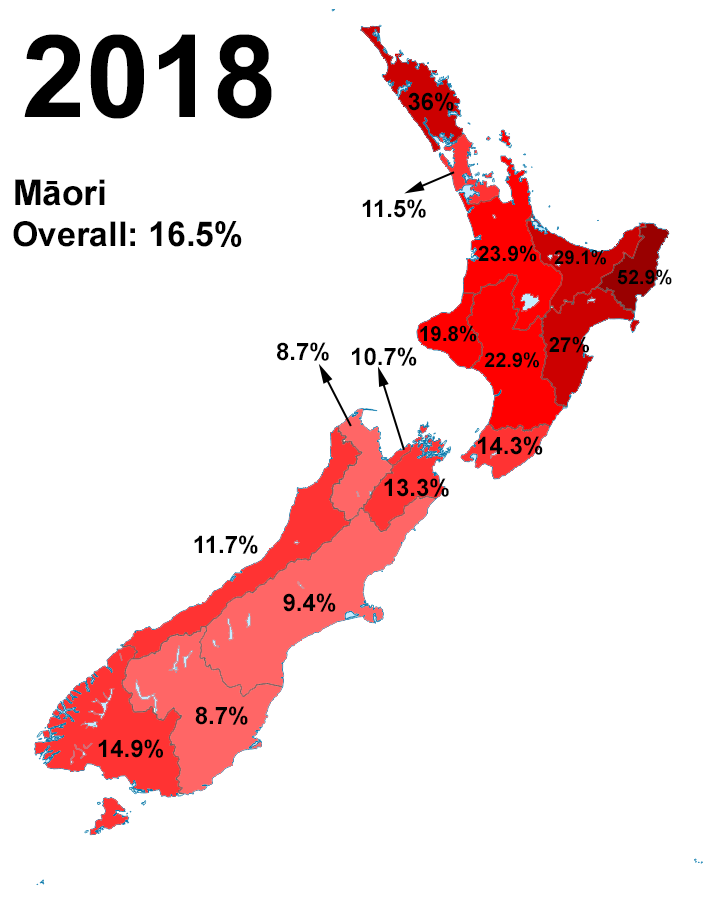
Māori in 2018

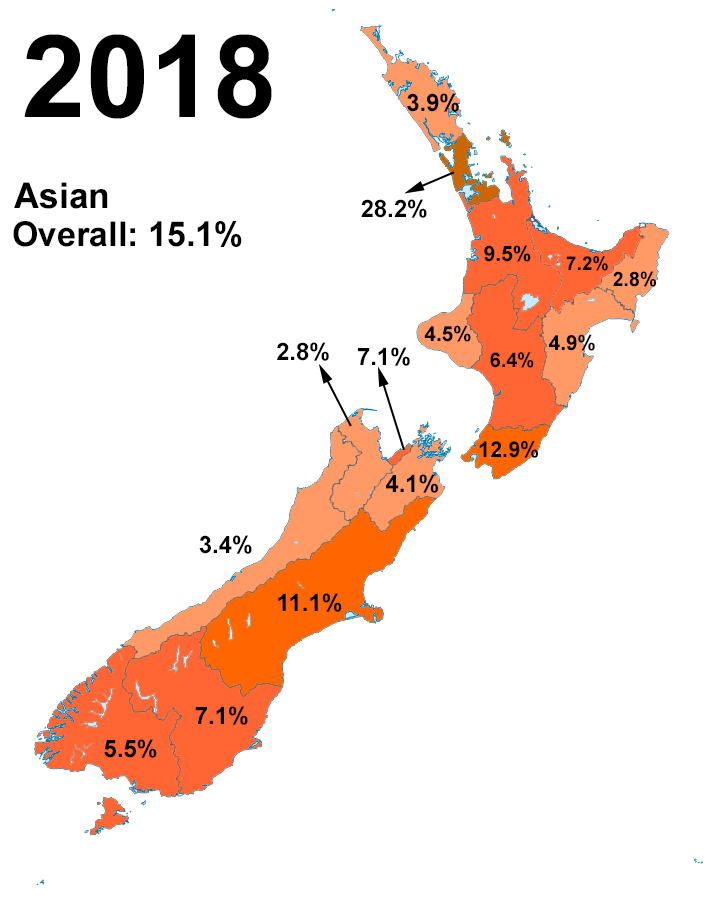
Asian in 2018

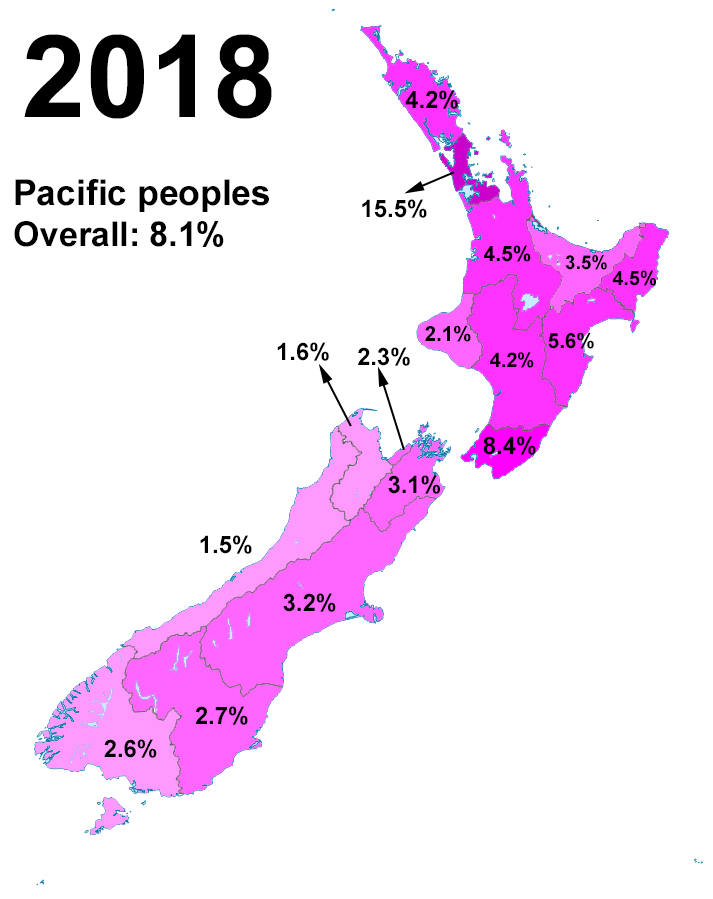
Pasifikas in 2018

== Language ==
Population of New Zealand by language spoken, 1996-2023
	1996		2001		2006		2013		2018		2023	
Languages spoken	#	%	#	%	#	%	#	%	#	%	#	%
English	3290454	95.3	3425301	96.1	3673626	95.9	3819972	96.1	4482132	95.4	4750056	95.1
Māori	153666	4.4	160527	4.5	157113	4.1	148395	3.7	185955	4.0	213849	4.3
Samoan	70785	2.0	81033	2.3	85428	2.2	86403	2.2	101937	2.2	110541	2.2
New Zealand Sign Language	26589	0.8	27285	0.8	24087	0.6	20235	0.5	22986	0.5	24678	0.5
None	91458	2.6	76053	2.1	75567	2.0	67509	1.7	101751	2.2	104721	2.1
Respondents	3453912	100	3563796	100	3830757	100	3973359	100	4699716	100	4993923	100
% population responded	95.5		95.4		95.1		93.7		>99.9		100	
Total population	3618303		3737280		4027947		4242048		4699755		4993923	

English has long been entrenched as a de facto national language due to its widespread use. In the 2018 census, 95.4 percent of respondents spoke English, down from 96.1 percent in 2013. The New Zealand English dialect is mostly non-rhotic with an exception being the Southern Burr found principally in Southland and parts of Otago. It is similar to Australian English and many speakers from the Northern Hemisphere are unable to tell the accents apart. In New Zealand English the short i (as in kit) has become centralised, leading to the phrase fish and chips sounding like "fush and chups" to the Australian ear. The words rarely and really, reel and real, doll and dole, pull and pool, witch and which, and full and fill can sometimes be pronounced as homophones. Some New Zealanders pronounce the past participles grown, thrown and mown using two syllables, whereas groan, throne and moan are pronounced as one syllable. New Zealanders often reply to a question or emphasise a point by adding a rising intonation at the end of the sentence.

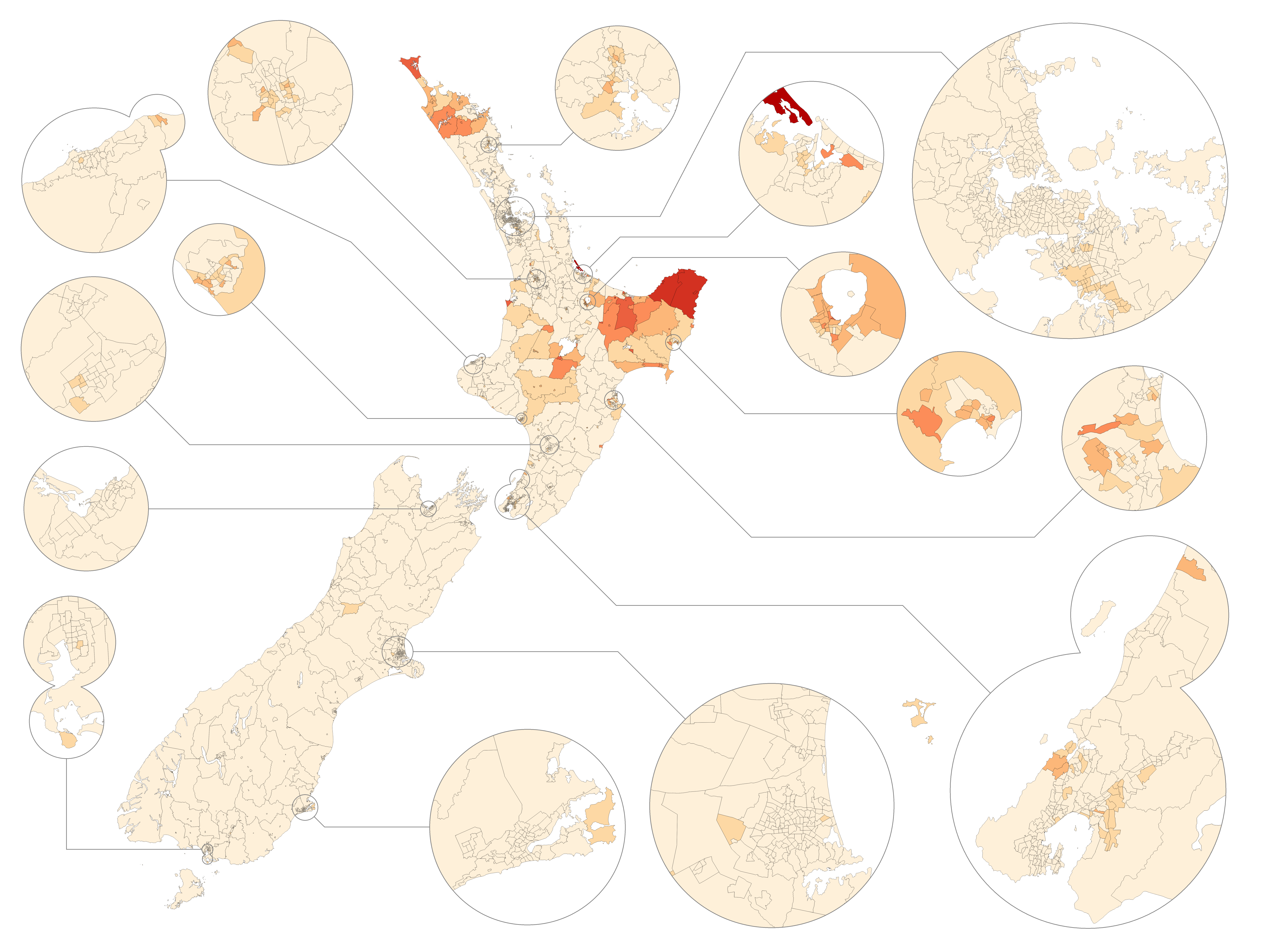
Speakers of Māori according to the 2013 census: Less than 5% More than 5% More than 10% More than 20% More than 30% More than 40% More than 50%

Initially, the Māori language (te reo Māori) was permitted in native schools to facilitate English instruction, but as time went on official attitudes hardened against any use of the language. Māori were discouraged from speaking their own language in schools and work places and it existed as a community language only in a few remote areas. The language underwent a revival beginning in the 1970s, and now more people speak Māori. The future of the language was the subject of a claim before the Waitangi Tribunal in 1985. As a result, Māori was declared an official language in 1987. In the 2013 census, 21.3 percent of Māori people—and 3.7 percent of all respondents, including some non-Māori people—reported conversational fluency in the language. (Note: In 2015, 55 percent of Māori adults (aged 15 years and over) reported some knowledge of te reo Māori. Of these speakers, 64 percent use Māori at home and 50,000 can speak the language "very well" or "well".) There are now Māori language immersion schools and two Māori Television channels, the only nationwide television channels to have the majority of their prime-time content delivered in Māori. Many places have officially been given dual Māori and English names in recent years.

In the 2018 census, 22,987 people reported the ability to use New Zealand Sign Language. It was declared one of New Zealand's official languages in 2006.

Samoan is the most widely spoken non-official language (2.2 percent), followed by "Northern Chinese" (including Mandarin; 2.0 percent), Hindi (1.5 percent) and French (1.2 percent). A considerable proportion of first- and second-generation migrants are multilingual.

== Religion ==
Religious affiliation in New Zealand (2018)
Affiliation (Note: This table includes all people who stated each religious affiliation, whether as their only religious affiliation or as one of several. Where a person reported more than one religious affiliation, they were counted in each applicable group.)	% of New Zealand population
Religious	44.93
Anglican	6.70
Roman Catholic	6.29
Presbyterian	4.71
Other Christian (Note: Including churches designated as "Māori Christian", such as the Rātana church.)	20.23
Hindu	2.63
Muslim	1.31
Buddhist	1.12
Other religions	2.83
Irreligious	48.47
Object to answering	6.66

The predominant religion in New Zealand is Christianity. As recorded in the 2018 census, about 38 percent of the population identified themselves as Christians, although regular church attendance is estimated at 15 percent. Another 48.5 percent indicated that they had no religion (up from 41.9 percent in 2013 and 34.7 percent in 2006) and around 7.5 percent affiliated with other religions.

The indigenous religion of the Māori population was animistic, but with the arrival of missionaries from the early nineteenth century most of the Māori population converted to Christianity. In the 2018 census, 3,699 Māori identify themselves as adhering to "Māori religions, beliefs and philosophies".

In the 2018 census, the largest reported Christian affiliations are Anglican (6.7 percent of the population), Roman Catholic (6.3 percent), Presbyterian (4.7 percent). There are also significant numbers of Christians who identify themselves with Methodist, Pentecostal, Baptist and Latter-day Saint churches, and the New Zealand-based Rātana church has adherents among Māori. Immigration and associated demographic change in recent decades has contributed to the growth of minority religions, especially Hinduism, Buddhism and Islam.

== Other subjects ==
=== Education ===
Education follows the three-tier model, which includes primary schools, followed by secondary schools (high schools) and tertiary education at universities or polytechnics. The Programme for International Student Assessment ranked New Zealand's education as the seventh highest in 2009. The Education Index, published with the UN's 2014 Human Development Index and based on data from 2013, listed New Zealand at 0.917, ranked second after Australia.

In July 2019 there were 476,240 primary students, 278,266 secondary students, and 58,340 students attending composite (combined primary and secondary) schools. Primary and secondary schooling is compulsory for children aged 6 to 16 with most children starting at 5. Early leaving exemptions may be granted to 15-year-old students that have been experiencing some ongoing difficulties at school or are unlikely to benefit from continued attendance. Parents and caregivers can home school their children if they obtain approval from the Ministry of Education and prove that their child will be taught "as regularly and as well as in a registered school". There are 13 school years and attending state (public) schools is nominally free from an individual's fifth birthday until the end of the calendar year following their 19th birthday.

The academic year in New Zealand varies between institutions, but generally runs from late January until mid-December for primary and secondary schools and polytechnics, and from late February until mid-November for universities. New Zealand has an adult literacy rate of 99 percent, and over half of the population aged 15 to 29 hold a tertiary qualification. (Note: Tertiary education in New Zealand describes all aspects of post-school education and training. Its ranges from informal non-assessed community courses in schools through to undergraduate degrees and advanced, research-based postgraduate degrees.) In the adult population 14.2 percent have a bachelor's degree or higher, 30.4 percent have some form of secondary qualification as their highest qualification and 22.4 percent have no formal qualification.

=== Income ===
New Zealand's early economy was based on sealing, whaling, flax, gold, kauri gum, and native timber. During the 1880s agricultural products became the highest export earner and farming was a major occupation within New Zealand. Farming is still a major employer, with 75 000 people indicating farming as their occupation during the 2006 census, although dairy farming has recently taken over from sheep as the largest sector. The largest occupation recorded during the 2018 census was sales assistant with 108,702 people, followed by office managers (65,907 people), chief executives or managing directors (54,480 people), and sales representatives not elsewhere included (51,747 people). The largest industries of employment were cafes and restaurants (67,608 people), supermarkets and grocery stores (57,609 people), primary education (55,779 people), hospitals (52,887 people), and house construction (51,804 people). Most people earn their income from wages or salaries (60.6 percent), with the other sources of income being superannuation or pensions (17.3 percent), interest and investments (16.8 percent) and self-employment (14.8 percent).

In 1982 New Zealand had the lowest per-capita income of all the developed nations surveyed by the World Bank. In 2010 the estimated gross domestic product (GDP) at purchasing power parity (PPP) per capita was roughly US$28,250, between the thirty-first and fifty-first highest for all countries. (Note: PPP GDP estimates from different organisations vary. The International Monetary Fund's estimate is US$27,420, ranked 32. The CIA World Factbook estimate is $28,000, ranked 51. The World Bank's estimate is US$29,352, ranked 31.) The median personal income in 2006 was $24,400. This was up from $15,600 in 1996, with the largest increases in the $50,000 to $70,000 bracket. Men earn more than women on average, with the median income for men in 2011 being $31,500, $12,400 more than women. The highest median personal income were for people identifying with the European or "other" ethnic group, while the lowest was from the Asian ethnic group. The median income for people identifying as Māori was $20,900. In 2013, the median personal income had risen slightly to $28,500.

Unemployment peaked above 10 percent in 1991 and 1992, before falling to a record low of 3.7 percent in 2007 (ranking third from twenty-seven comparable OECD nations). Unemployment rose back to 7 percent in late 2009. In the June 2017 quarter, unemployment had fallen to 4.8 percent. This was the lowest unemployment rate since December 2008, after the start of the Great Recession, when it was 4.4%. That census held in 2006 stated that 15% of New Zealanders did some form of voluntary work through any organisation, group or marae (men 14%, women 17%). Home ownership has declined since 1991, from 73.8 percent to 66.9 percent in 2006.

== See also ==
- Demographics of Auckland
- Demographics of the Cook Islands, associated with New Zealand
- Health in New Zealand
- Homelessness in New Zealand
- Housing in New Zealand
- List of populated places in New Zealand
- New Zealand census
- Social class in New Zealand
- Demographics of New Zealand Parliament (2014–2017)
- Demographics of New Zealand Parliament (2020–2023)
- Demographics of New Zealand Parliament (2023–2026)

== Bibliography ==
- Bell, Daphne, ed. (2005). New to New Zealand: a guide to ethnic groups in New Zealand (3rd ed.). Reed Books. ISBN 978-0-790-00998-8.
- Bain, Carolyn (2006). New Zealand. Lonely Planet. ISBN 978-1-74104-535-2.
- Crystal, David (2003). The Cambridge Encyclopedia of the English Language (2nd ed.). Cambridge University Press. ISBN 978-0-521-53033-0.
- Hay, Jennifer; Maclagan, Margaret; Gordon, Elizabeth (2008). Dialects of English: New Zealand English. Edinburgh University Press. ISBN 978-0-7486-2529-1.
- Kortmann, Bernd; Schneider, Edgar; Burridge, Kate; Mesthrie, Rajend; Upton, Clive (2004). A handbook of varieties of English. Berlin: Mouton de Gruyter. ISBN 978-3-11-017532-5.
- 2013 Census QuickStats, Statistics New Zealand, 2013, ISBN 978-0-478-40864-5
