= Demographics of Auckland =

Population data of Auckland, New Zealand

- Population pyramid of Auckland in 2022
- Population: 1,440,300 (2022)

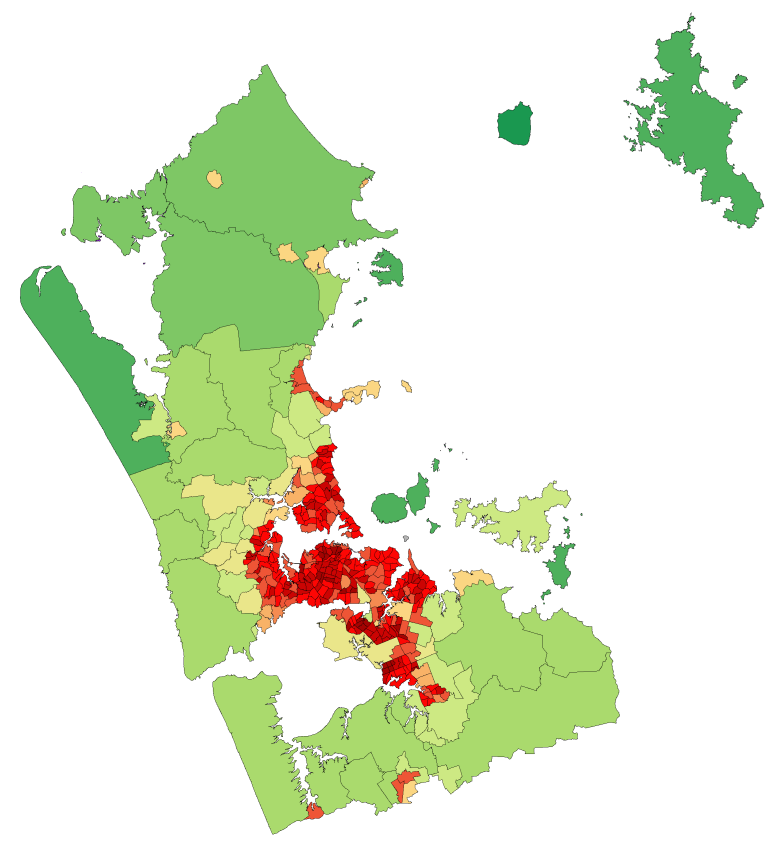
Population densities of the Auckland Region as of 2010 Less than 1 person per square km 1 person per square km and above 5 people per square km and above 10 people per square km and above 50 people per square km and above 100 people per square km and above 250 people per square km and above 500 people per square km and above 750 people per square km and above 1000 people per square km and above 2000 people per square km and above 3000 people per square km and above 4000 people per square km and above

The Auckland Region is New Zealand's most populous territorial authority and Auckland its most populous city. In the 2018 census, 1,571,718 persons declared themselves as residents of the region. In the 2023 census, the population increased with 1,656,486 persons declaring themselves as residents of the region. More recently, the estimated population of the Auckland Region in 2024 was 1,797,300. The Auckland Region accounts for about one-third (33.4%) of New Zealand's population. Auckland has a large multicultural mix, including the largest Polynesian population in the world.

While having strong natural population growth, Auckland also has significant external (from overseas) immigration partially offset by internal (within New Zealand) emigration. During the decade up to 2011, approximately 50 people per day moved to Auckland, requiring an average of 21 new homes, and occupying in excess of one extra hectare of land.

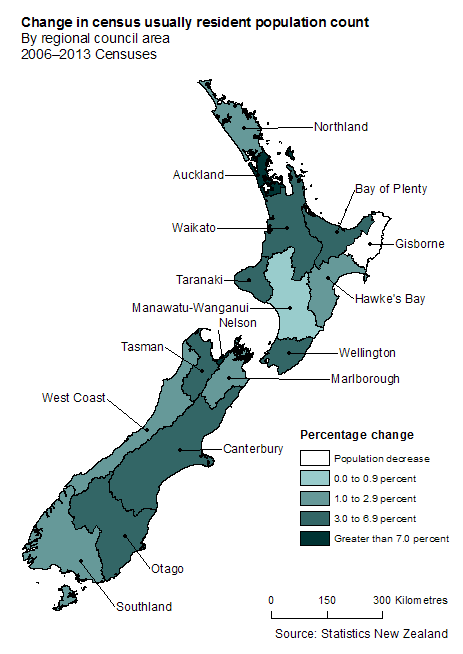
Map depicting the change in population by New Zealand region based on the 2006 and 2013 censuses

== Ethnicity ==
Tāmaki Māori, the group of Māori iwi that are indigenous to Auckland, include Ngāti Pāoa, Ngāi Tai, Te Wai-o-Hua, Ngāti Te Ata and Te Kawerau-a-Maki, and the Ngāti Whātua hapū (sub-tribe) of Ngāti Whātua-o-Ōrākei. Auckland also has a large urban Māori population.

The proportion of Asians and other non-European immigrants has increased during the last decades due to immigration, and the removal of restrictions directly or indirectly based on ethnicity. Immigration to New Zealand is heavily concentrated towards Auckland (partly for job market reasons). This strong focus on Auckland has led the immigration services to award extra points towards immigration visa requirements for people intending to move to other parts of New Zealand.

The following table shows the ethnic profile of Auckland's population, as recorded in the 2006, 2013, 2018 and 2023 New Zealand censuses. The substantial percentage drop of 'Europeans' in 2006 was mainly caused by the increasing numbers of people from this group choosing to define themselves as 'New Zealanders', as a result of a media campaign that encouraged people to give the response 'New Zealander' even though this was not one of the groups listed on the census form. In the 2013 census fewer Europeans identify themselves as 'New Zealander', leading to a significant increase of numbers in 'Europeans'.

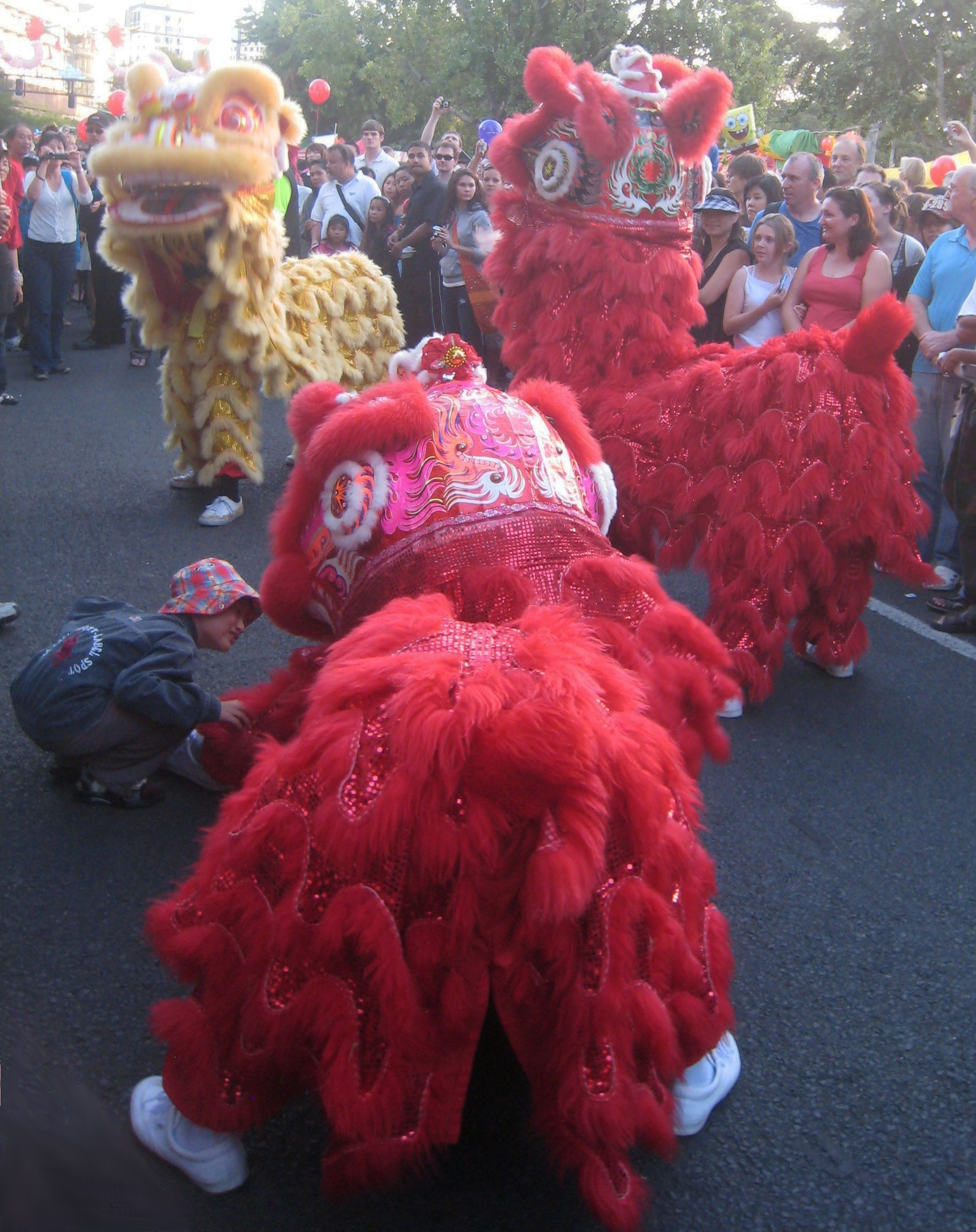
Auckland's fastest growing ethnic groups are Asian. Here, lion dancers perform at the Auckland Lantern Festival.

Ethnic groups of Auckland by census
Ethnicity	2006 census		2013 census		2018 census		2023 census	
Ethnicity	Number	%	Number	%	Number	%	Number	%
European	700,158	56.5	789,306	59.3	841,386	53.5	825,144	49.8
European (not further defined)	9,162	0.7	10,668	0.8	12,381	0.8	7,107	0.4
New Zealand European	611,898	49.4	696,963	52.3	738,567	47.0	726,822	43.9
British and Irish	35,070	2.8	35,379	2.7	39,249	2.5	37,875	2.3
Dutch	7,785	0.6	7,995	0.6	7,920	0.5	7,917	0.5
Greek	489	<0.1	492	<0.1	597	<0.1	642	<0.1
Polish	705	0.1	792	0.1	1,059	0.1	1,164	0.1
South Slav	3,819	0.3	3,531	0.3	3,708	0.2	3,957	0.2
Italian	1,071	0.1	1,398	0.1	2,046	0.1	2,427	0.1
German	4,224	0.3	4,782	0.4	6,135	0.4	5,919	0.4
Australian	8,637	0.7	7,062	0.5	8,688	0.6	8,268	0.5
Other European	30,906	2.5	36,909	2.8	43,458	0.8	49,992	3.0
Māori	137,304	11.1	142,767	10.7	181,194	11.5	203,544	12.3
Pacific peoples	177,948	14.4	194,958	14.6	243,966	15.5	275,079	16.6
Pacific peoples (not further defined)	267	<0.1	378	<0.1	1,296	0.1	870	0.1
Samoan	87,840	7.1	95,916	7.2	118,503	7.5	135,708	8.2
Cook Islands Māori	34,788	2.8	36,810	2.8	46,668	3.0	52,671	3.2
Tongan	40,140	3.2	46,971	3.5	62,403	4.0	72,534	4.4
Niuean	17,667	1.4	18,555	1.4	23,088	1.5	25,542	1.5
Tokelauan	1,848	0.1	1,959	0.1	2,406	0.2	2,604	0.2
Fijian	5,850	0.5	8,493	0.6	11,202	0.7	12,987	0.8
Other Pacific peoples	4,755	0.4	5,841	0.4	7,485	0.5	9,699	0.6
Asian	234,279	18.9	307,233	23.1	442,674	28.2	518,178	31.3
Asian (not further defined)	1,143	0.1	2,025	0.2	5,850	0.4	5,373	0.3
Southeast Asian (not further defined)	324	<0.1	774	0.1	3,366	0.2	4,323	0.3
Filipino	9,822	0.8	20,502	1.5	32,850	2.1	48,186	2.9
Cambodian	3,372	0.3	4,185	0.3	4,386	0.3	5,232	0.3
Vietnamese	3,174	0.3	4,386	0.3	6,324	0.4	8,955	0.5
Other Southeast Asian	8,574	0.7	11,310	0.8	13,527	0.9	16,524	1.0
Chinese	98,418	7.9	118,233	8.9	171,309	10.9	194,484	11.7
Indian	74,460	6.0	106,329	8.0	154,824	9.9	175,794	10.6
Sri Lankan	5,049	0.4	6,903	0.5	9,987	0.6	13,239	0.8
Japanese	5,289	0.4	6,720	0.5	8,463	0.5	8,754	0.5
Korean	21,354	1.7	21,984	1.7	25,038	1.6	27,270	1.6
Other Asian	5,562	0.4	7,218	0.5	11,100	0.7	16,431	1.0
Middle Eastern/Latin American/African	18,558	1.5	24,945	1.9	35,838	2.3	44,718	2.7
Middle Eastern	10,710	0.9	12,854	1.0	17,088	1.1	19,797	1.2
Latin American	3,090	0.2	5,820	0.4	11,163	0.7	15,741	1.0
African	4,800	0.4	6,303	0.5	7,737	0.5	9,402	0.6
Other	100,110	8.1	15,639	1.2	16,746	1.1	15,144	0.9
Total people stated	1,239,054		1,331,427		1,571,718		1,656,486	
Not elsewhere included	65,907	5.1	84,123	5.9	0	0.0	0	0.0

Ethnic groups by Auckland local board area, 2023 census
Local board area	European		Maori		Pacific		Asian		MELAA		Other	
Local board area	Num.	%	Num.	%	Num.	%	Num.	%	Num.	%	Num.	%
Rodney	66,204	84.9	9,453	11.4	3,324	4.3	7,341	9.4	945	1.2	1,038	1.3
Hibiscus and Bays	86,598	75.9	8,169	7.2	2,790	2.4	23,436	20.6	2,505	2.2	1,278	1.1
Upper Harbour	37,794	49.1	4,713	6.1	2,418	3.1	34,983	45.5	2,778	3.6	825	1.1
Kaipatiki	49,785	56.5	8,328	9.4	5,835	6.6	30,669	34.8	3,180	3.6	960	1.1
Devonport-Takapuna	38,493	66.4	3,603	6.2	1,695	2.9	16,842	29.0	1,812	3.1	573	1.0
Henderson-Massey	54,420	43.6	22,629	18.1	27,629	22.2	39,546	31.7	3,564	2.9	1,227	1.0
Waitākere Ranges	37,737	70.0	7,452	13.8	7,104	13.2	9,405	17.4	1,347	2.5	555	1.0
Great Barrier	1,122	89.7	285	22.8	27	2.2	21	1.7	9	0.7	18	1.4
Waiheke	8,061	88.0	1,125	12.3	333	3.6	417	4.6	471	5.1	96	1.0
Waitemata	48,819	59.9	6,876	8.4	4,725	5.8	25,692	31.5	3,903	4.8	642	0.8
Whau	30,522	37.6	8,913	11.0	16,050	19.7	34,332	42.2	2,832	3.5	603	0.7
Albert-Eden	56,025	58.0	8,322	8.6	8,343	8.6	31,953	33.1	3,342	3.5	765	0.8
Puketapapa	18,261	32.1	3,795	6.7	8,931	15.7	28,701	50.4	2,610	4.6	414	0.7
Orakei	56,937	68.4	5,316	6.4	3,072	3.7	22,215	26.7	2,790	3.4	753	0.9
Maungakiekie-Tamaki	32,973	42.2	11,013	14.1	20,190	25.9	23,370	29.9	2,319	3.0	573	0.7
Howick	58,503	38.1	9,717	6.3	12,339	8.0	80,565	52.5	4,332	2.8	2,070	1.3
Mangere-Otahuhu	14,466	18.4	13,302	16.9	47,463	60.4	15,408	19.6	804	1.0	282	0.4
Otara-Papatoetoe	12,678	14.6	13,749	15.8	42,381	48.7	30,792	35.4	855	1.0	333	0.4
Manurewa	24,213	24.5	24,858	25.2	39,450	39.9	27,249	27.6	2,091	2.1	525	0.5
Papakura	26,213	36.7	17,811	24.6	14,811	20.5	24,732	34.2	1,257	1.7	651	0.9
Franklin	64,986	77.0	14,019	16.6	6,129	7.3	10,509	12.5	969	1.1	966	1.1
Total	825,144	49.8	203,544	12.3	275,079	16.6	518,178	31.3	44,718	2.7	15,144	0.9

== Country of birth ==
Birthplace of usually resident population, 2006–18 Census
Country	2006 census		2013 census		2018 census	
Country	Number	%	Number	%	Number	%
New Zealand	777,942	63.0	805,356	60.9	904,905	58.4
China	54,519	4.4	65,385	4.9	96,540	6.2
India	30,747	2.5	43,410	3.3	71,358	4.6
England	72,975	5.9	74,940	5.7	68,799	4.4
Fiji	28,446	2.3	39,087	3.0	44,658	2.9
Samoa	35,766	2.9	35,586	2.7	38,232	2.5
South Africa	24,630	2.0	30,612	2.3	36,759	2.4
Philippines	9,069	0.7	18,621	1.4	30,237	2.0
Australia	20,250	1.6	19,590	1.5	21,903	1.4
South Korea	20,034	1.6	19,470	1.5	21,753	1.4
Tonga	17,208	1.4	18,117	1.4	20,913	1.3
Malaysia	8,424	0.7	9,459	0.7	11,607	0.7
United States	5,931	0.4	7,272	0.5	8,988	0.6
Sri Lanka	4,503	0.4	5,841	0.4	8,529	0.6
Cook Islands	10,374	0.8	9,183	0.7	8,259	0.5
Hong Kong	5,844	0.5	5,109	0.4	8,061	0.5
Scotland	8,961	0.7	7,851	0.6	7,443	0.5
Taiwan	7,485	0.6	6,378	0.5	7,113	0.5
Japan	4,158	0.3	4,959	0.4	6,279	0.4
Vietnam	3,264	0.3	3,978	0.3	5,859	0.4
Germany	3,588	0.3	4,164	0.3	5,253	0.3
Other countries	80,208	6.5	88,185	6.7	115,791	7.5
Total people stated	1,234,317		1,322,535		1,571,718	
Not elsewhere included	70,641	5.4	93,015	6.6	22,476	1.5

Birthplace by Auckland local board area, 2013 census
Local board area	New Zealand		Australia		Pacific Islands		British Isles		Europe		North America		Asia		Middle East and Africa		Latin America and Other	
Local board area	Num.	%	Num.	%	Num.	%	Num.	%	Num.	%	Num.	%	Num.	%	Num.	%	Num.	%
Rodney	39,678	77.8	936	1.8	540	1.1	5,763	11.3	1,098	2.2	549	1.1	1,272	2.5	1,092	2.1	90	0.2
Hibiscus and Bays	53,805	63.0	1,476	1.7	624	0.7	13,443	15.7	2,574	3.0	912	1.1	5,499	6.4	6,717	7.9	321	0.4
Upper Harbour	27,525	54.1	699	1.4	762	1.5	4,296	8.4	1,260	2.5	438	0.9	11,562	22.7	4,140	8.1	168	0.3
Kaipatiki	45,189	58.1	1,251	1.6	2,358	3.0	5,991	7.7	2,238	2.9	648	0.8	15,936	20.5	3,711	4.8	432	0.6
Devonport-Takapuna	32,226	60.5	1,113	2.1	522	1.0	5,919	11.1	1,728	3.2	759	1.4	8,598	16.1	2,073	3.9	315	0.6
Henderson-Massey	64,248	64.2	1,230	1.2	10,536	10.5	4,698	4.7	2,232	2.2	501	0.5	13,293	13.3	2,931	2.9	399	0.4
Waitākere Ranges	31,902	70.6	756	1.7	2,265	5.0	4,806	10.6	1,284	2.8	498	1.1	2,454	5.4	1,038	2.3	186	0.4
Great Barrier	663	81.3	21	2.6	3	0.4	72	8.8	21	2.6	18	2.2	9	1.1	9	1.1	0	0.0
Waiheke	5,442	70.3	213	2.8	69	0.9	1,107	14.3	321	4.1	195	2.5	174	2.2	147	1.9	75	1.0
Waitemata	37,689	53.1	1,539	2.2	1,644	2.3	5,190	7.3	2,763	3.9	1,323	1.9	17,589	24.8	2,190	3.1	1,092	1.5
Whau	54,834	54.5	1,584	1.2	3,153	11.4	5,379	4.4	1,899	1.5	966	0.5	18,618	23.5	2,085	2.9	465	0.4
Albert-Eden	54,834	61.6	1,584	1.8	3,153	3.5	5,379	6.0	1,899	2.1	966	1.1	18,618	20.9	2,085	2.3	465	0.5
Puketapapa	24,192	48.3	513	1.0	5,274	10.5	1,773	3.5	645	1.3	270	0.5	15,507	31.0	1,683	3.4	204	0.4
Orakei	49,224	65.4	1,815	2.4	1,230	1.6	6,621	8.8	2,679	3.6	1,083	1.4	9,633	12.8	2,526	3.4	513	0.7
Maungakiekie-Tamaki	38,955	60.8	798	1.2	8,211	12.8	2,496	3.9	1,263	2.0	429	0.7	10,164	15.9	1,449	2.3	267	0.4
Howick	60,189	49.4	1,398	1.1	4,815	4.0	8,730	7.2	2,184	1.8	723	0.6	32,928	27.0	10,488	8.6	399	0.3
Mangere-Otahuhu	36,519	56.8	588	0.9	21,858	34.0	810	1.3	237	0.4	183	0.3	3,477	5.4	501	0.8	84	0.1
Otara-Papatoetoe	36,642	53.4	567	0.8	20,577	30.0	870	1.3	246	0.4	165	0.2	8,598	12.5	837	1.2	93	0.1
Manurewa	48,492	64.6	744	1.0	13,962	18.6	2,082	2.8	429	0.6	198	0.3	6,834	9.1	2,193	2.9	93	0.1
Papakura	32,337	76.5	555	1.3	2,463	5.8	1,950	4.6	429	1.0	174	0.4	3,162	7.5	1,107	2.6	105	0.2
Franklin	48,744	79.3	981	1.6	1,083	1.8	5,502	9.0	954	1.6	378	0.6	2,085	3.3	1,623	2.6	84	0.1

== Religion ==
Major religions in Auckland, 2013 Census
1. Catholic 13.29 (13.1%)
2. Anglican 9.1 (8.95%)
3. Presbyterian 7.4 (7.28%)
4. Other Christianity 17.77 (17.5%)
5. Hinduism 4.75 (4.67%)
6. Buddhism 2.53 (2.49%)
7. Islam 2.41 (2.37%)
8. Other religions 2.88 (2.83%)
9. Undeclared 3.75 (3.69%)
10. No religion 37.83 (37.2%)

Religion of usually resident population, 2001–13 Census
Religion	2001 census		2006 census		2013 census !	
Religion	Number	%	Number	%	Number	%
Christian	604,713	56.98	636,405	52.96	615,936	47.56
Catholic	153,678	14.48	169,881	14.14	172,110	13.29
Anglican	147,993	13.94	141,522	11.78	117,843	9.10
Presbyterian, Congregational and Reformed	110,490	10.41	109,539	9.12	95,892	7.40
Christian (not further defined)	63,180	5.95	63,714	5.30	78,480	6.06
Methodist	47,034	4.43	50,442	4.20	46,770	3.61
Pentecostal	23,238	2.19	31,104	2.59	31,386	2.42
Baptist	18,546	1.75	21,495	1.79	21,237	1.64
Latter-day Saints	16,632	1.57	19,230	1.60	19,374	1.50
Other Christian religions	32,796	3.09	37,560	3.13	39,240	3.03
Hindu	25,788	2.43	45,327	3.77	61,458	4.75
Buddhist	22,722	2.14	29,217	2.43	32,778	2.53
Islam/Muslim	15,318	1.44	23,688	1.97	31,158	2.41
Sikh	3,225	0.30	6,177	0.51	11,715	0.90
Māori Christian	14,481	1.36	14,574	1.21	11,649	0.90
Ratana	12,585	1.19	12,438	1.04	10,122	0.78
Ringatu	1,977	0.19	2,253	0.19	1,617	0.12
Other Maori Christian religions	153	0.01	141	0.01	114	0.01
Spiritualism and New Age religions	4,854	0.46	5,907	0.49	5,238	0.40
Judaism/Jewish	3,132	0.30	3,315	0.28	3,099	0.24
Other religions	4,767	0.45	5,541	0.46	5,637	0.44
Total people with at least one religious affiliation	692,691	65.27	763,191	63.51	772,095	59.61
No religion	308,592	29.08	390,411	32.49	489,915	37.83
Object to answering	68,601	6.46	67,302	5.60	48,585	3.75

== Future growth ==
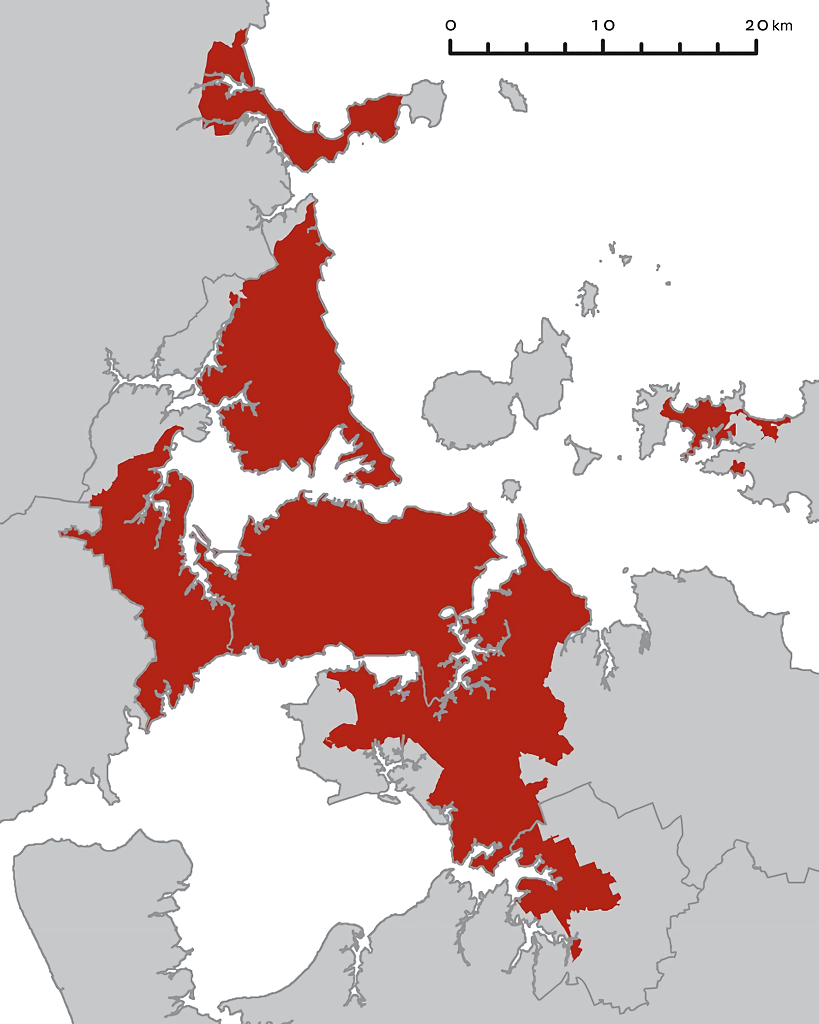
The urbanised extent of Auckland (red), in 2009

Auckland is expecting substantial population growth via immigration and natural population increases (which contribute to growth at about one-third and two-thirds, respectively), and is set to grow to an estimated 2 million inhabitants by 2050 (a compounded annual growth rate of 1.2% vs the 2013 number above). This substantial increase in population will have a major impact on transport, housing and other infrastructure that is in many cases already considered under pressure. It is also feared by some organisations, such as the Auckland Regional Council, that urban sprawl will result from the growth and, as a result, that it is necessary to address this proactively in planning policy.

A 'Regional Growth Strategy' has been adopted that sees limits on further subdivision and intensification of existing use as its main sustainability measures. This policy is contentious, as it naturally limits the uses of private land, especially the subdivision of urban fringe properties, by setting 'Metropolitan Urban Limits' in planning documents like the District Plan. According to the 2006 Census projections, the medium-variant scenario shows that the population is projected to continue growing, to reach 1.93 million by 2031. The high-variant scenario shows the region's population growing to over two million by 2031.

== See also ==
- Demographics of New Zealand
