= Australian Linguistic Society =

Australian academic association

- ALS Logo
- Founded: 1967; 59 years ago
- Type: Learned society
- Purpose: Linguistics
- Members: ~400
- President: Bill Palmer
- Website: www.als.asn.au

The Australian Linguistic Society (ALS) is an academic association for linguists. It was established in 1967 with the primary goal of furthering interest in and support for linguistics research and teaching in Australia. The Australian Linguistic Society also publishes a peer-reviewed academic journal, the Australian Journal of Linguistics, holds an annual conference, an occasional linguistics institute, and has developed and endorsed several policies and statements relating to language and linguistics.

The current president of the ALS is Bill Palmer, the Secretary is James Bednall, and the Treasurer is Robert Mailhammer.

The Society recognises Accredited Linguists (ALing) who have completed relevant linguistic qualifications.

== Objectives ==
The specific objectives of the Australian Linguistic Society are:

1. To further interest in, and support for, linguistic research and teaching in Australia.
2. To organise an annual meeting and visits of local and overseas speakers.
3. To publish a journal of international standing.
4. To organise an International Congress of Linguists when appropriate.
5. To organise an Australian Linguistic Institute.

== Accredited Linguist ==
Accredited Linguist is a qualification awarded by the Society and indicates that the holder:

- has completed a course of study equivalent to a pass degree with a major in Linguistics, or
- been able to demonstrate a sound knowledge of Linguistics at an advanced level, and has applied that knowledge competently and ethically through practice for more than three years

Accredited Linguists are entitled to use the post-nominal ALing.

== Publications ==
The official journal of the Australian Linguistic Society is the Australian Journal of Linguistics, a peer-reviewed journal of international standing. The journal is concerned with all branches of linguistics, and has an international scope but with a particular focus on research about Australian Aboriginal languages, varieties of Australian English, and research by Australian linguists. The current editor is Jean Mulder. The Society also publishes proceedings from the annual ALS conference. Since 1998, selected refereed proceedings have been made available online.

== Conferences ==
The inaugural meeting of the Australian Linguistic Society was held in 1967 at the Australian National University. The Society was initially known as the Linguistic Society of Australia but was renamed the Australian Linguistic Society at the 1978 conference. Conferences have been held every year since the inaugural meeting, at different Australian universities. A list of past conferences can be found on the ALS website.

== Awards ==
ALS offers several scholarships and awards. These include:

1. The Gerhardt Laves Scholarship, to cover fieldwork expenses for postgraduate researchers studying indigenous languages of the Australian region.
2. The Susan Kaldor Scholarship, to support student members of ALS in attending an international linguistics summer/winter school or institute.
3. The Michael Clyne Prize, to be awarded for best postgraduate research thesis in immigrant bilingualism and language contact.
4. The Jalwang Scholarship, to support linguists to give back to the community by converting some of their research into materials of benefit to the language community.
5. The Barb Kelly Prize, to be awarded to the most outstanding postgraduate research thesis in any area of linguistics.
6. The Talkley Award, to be awarded to a linguist who has made significant contributions towards promoting language and linguistics in the Australian public arena.

== Policy statements ==
The Australian Linguistic Society has developed and endorsed policies relating to the linguistic rights of Aboriginal and Torres Strait Islander communities; the ethical conduct of linguistic research, and the use of language analysis in relation to questions of national origin in refugee cases.
