= Can We Help? =

- Genre: Lifestyle
- Presented by: Peter Rowsthorn
- Starring: Kate Burridge; Christian Horgan
- Country of origin: Australia
- Original language: English
- No. of seasons: 6

Production
- Running time: Approximately 30 minutes

Original release
- Network: ABC1; ABC2
- Release: 9 June 2006 – 2011

Can We Help? is an Australian television series hosted by Peter Rowsthorn which aired on ABC TV starting in 2006. The series sets out to solve puzzles and answer viewers' questions.

Its sixth and final season was in 2011 when it was broadcast on ABC1 at 6.00pm on Saturdays. The program is driven by viewer questions and requests for help in regard to a wide range of subjects. The show specializes in reuniting families and loved ones and granting simple wishes to those in need, but over the years has introduced many other segments with a strong sense of history and helping others.

The show debuted on 6 June 2006 to low ratings (approximately 200,000 viewers, Nash). However, by the end of 2007 the figures had climbed to approximately 490,000 viewers Nash (not including Tas and Reeg).

Regular expert presenters include Kate Burridge, Christian Horgan, Dr Norman Swan, Dr Karl Kruszelnicki and Tanya Ha. The program encourages people to send in questions and interact with the show and "helping" community via the show's website plus Facebook and Twitter pages.

The program contains closed captions within its broadcast signal and is classified G (General).
