= Australian Journal of Linguistics =

- Discipline: Linguistics
- Language: English
- Edited by: Keith Allan, Jean Mulder

Publication details
- History: 1981–present
- Publisher: Routledge
- Frequency: Quarterly
- Impact factor: 0.26 (2011)

Standard abbreviations
- ISO 4: Aust. J. Linguist.

Indexing
- ISSN: 0726-8602 (print); 1469-2996 (web)
- LCCN: 83646833
- OCLC no.: 231043439

Links
- Journal homepage; Online access; Online archive

The Australian Journal of Linguistics (AJL) is a quarterly peer-reviewed academic journal in the field of linguistics established in 1981. It is the official journal of the Australian Linguistic Society and is published by Routledge.

The journal publishes papers that make a significant theoretical, methodological and/or practical contribution to the field and are accessible to a broad audience. Its main focus is theoretical linguistics, as well as matters pertaining particularly to Australia such as Australian English and its indigenous languages.

The current editor for AJL is Jean Mulder of University of Melbourne.
