= Jean Mulder =

Australian linguist

- Born: September 29, 1954 (age 72); Niskayuna, New York, US

Academic background
- Education: University of California, Santa Barbara (BA); University of California, Los Angeles (MA, PhD)
- Thesis: Ergativity in Coast Tsimshian (Sm’algyax) (1988)
- Doctoral advisor: Pamela Munro; Sandra Thompson
- Other advisor: Paul Kroskrity

Academic work
- Discipline: Linguist
- Sub-discipline: Australian English linguistics, Tshimshian linguistics
- Institutions: University of Melbourne

Jean Mulder is a linguist. Mulder's research interests include Australian English and Tsimshian, a North American Indian language. Mulder is currently an Honorary Senior Fellow in the Department of Linguistics at the University of Melbourne, having been a Professor there until 2017. She is currently the editor of the Australian Journal of Linguistics.

== Early life and education ==
Mulder was born in Niskayuna, New York. She earned a BA in mathematics and linguistics from the University of California, Santa Barbara, and received her MA in 1978 and PhD in 1988, both in linguistics, from the University of California, Los Angeles.

She is a publicly regarded expert on Australian English, working specifically on features of morphology and syntax. Of particular note is her work on 'final but' in Australian English.

Mulder has also been extensively involved in developing and promoting the Victorian Certificate of Education subject English Language. As part of this she is also a strong public advocate of teaching linguistics and grammar in schools.

== Selected publications ==
- Mulder, J., & Sellers, H. (2010). Classifying clitics in Sm'algyax: Approaching theory from the field. In Berez, A., Mulder, J., & Rosenblum, D. (eds.), Fieldwork and linguistic analysis in Indigenous languages of the Americas, Language Documentation & Conservation Special Publication No. 2, 33–56.
- Mulder, J., & Thompson, S. A. (2008). The grammaticization of but as a final particle in English conversation. Crosslinguistic studies of clause combining: The multifunctionality of conjunctions, 80, 179–204.
- Mulder, J. (2007). Establishing linguistics in secondary education in Victoria, Australia. Language and Linguistics Compass, 1(3), 133–154.
- Burridge, K., & Mulder, J. G. (1998). English in Australia and New Zealand: An introduction to its history, structure, and use. Oxford: Oxford University Press.
- Mulder, J. G. (1994). Ergativity in Coast Tsimshian (Sm'algyax) (Vol. 124). Univ of California Press.
