= Barbara Kelly (linguist) =

Australian linguist

- Born: January 24, 1968
- Died: December 14, 2022 (aged 54)
- Occupation: Linguist

Academic background
- Education: University of California, Santa Barbara

Academic work
- Discipline: Linguistics
- Institutions: University of Melbourne

Barbara (“Barb”) Frances Kelly (January 24, 1968 - December 14, 2022) was an Australian linguist. Kelly's research interests spanned the subfields of language documentation, cognitive linguistics and first language acquisition.

== Career ==
Kelly attended Rusden teacher's college and Latrobe University before receiving her doctorate degree in linguistics from the University of California, Santa Barbara. Kelly later worked at Stanford University and Lexicon Branding. In 2004, she became a lecturer in the Linguistics Department at the University of Melbourne. At the time of her death, Kelly was associate professor in sociolinguistics at the University of Melbourne.

While a PhD student, Kelly conducted fieldwork in Nepal on the Sherpa language. She later conducted research on Murrinhpatha.

== Personal life ==
Kelly was born prematurely. She grew up in Gippsland and Frankston, Victoria. At the time of her death, she was married to computer scientist Lawrence Cavedon. The couple had one son.

== Legacy ==
The Australian Linguistics Society awards the annual Barb Kelly Prize to outstanding theses.

A symposium was held in Kelly's honor in 2023.

== Selected publications ==
- Kelly, Barbara Frances (2003). The emergence of argument structure from gesture to speech.
