= 2006 Progressive Enterprises dispute =

Labor dispute in New Zealand

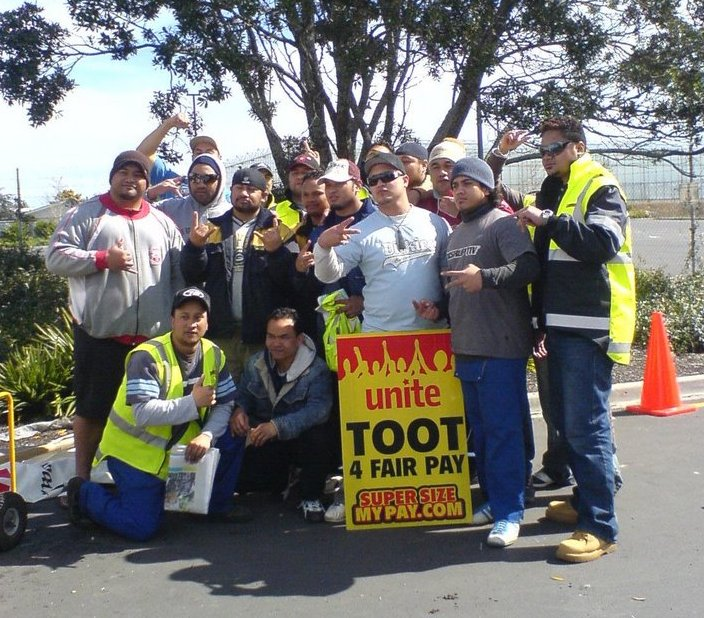
Locked out workers at an Auckland picket.

The 2006 Progressive Enterprises dispute was an industrial dispute between New Zealand supermarket company Progressive Enterprises and employees represented by the National Distribution Union and the EPMU. On 25 August 2006, over 500 employees at Progressive's four distribution centres (in Auckland, Palmerston North and Christchurch) began a 48-hour strike supporting a demand for a national collective agreement involving an eight percent wage increase and pay parity between the four centres. On 26 August 2006 the company locked out the strikers indefinitely, suspending operations at its distribution centres, with suppliers delivering goods directly to the supermarkets and also setting up amateur small scale distribution centres in car parks of Countdown supermarkets. The dispute was resolved on 21 September 2006 when Progressive Enterprises agreed to pay parity and a 4.5% wage increase.

== Background ==
In 2003 Progressive closed its Auckland and Christchurch distribution centers and rehired the redundant workers on lower pay, the closures ended the former national agreement and resulted in a NZ$2.50 per hour pay gap between the four sites. On 25 November 2005 Progressive Enterprises was bought by the Australian Woolworths conglomerate, the country's largest private employer.

On Friday 25 August 2006, workers at the Progressive Enterprises distribution centres began a 48 hour long strike, as well as working to rule and a ban on overtime, in support of a nationwide collective agreement with equal pay rates. and existing allowances combined into a site allowance of up to $2.50, an 8% pay rise and an extra week service leave. On the 28th, workers voted unanimously to extend the strike. Following the strike the company locked out the workers indefinitely, calling the union demands unrealistic.

== Economic effects ==
On the 11th day of the lock out TVNZ reported that gaps on the shelves at Progressive owned supermarkets were becoming the norm. The company stated that it was confident it could keep most shelves stocked, though most customers interviewed by ONE News had noticed gaps. That same day a spokesperson for the company told the Gisborne Herald that there were certainly empty gaps on shelves at most supermarkets, although this was not having an impact on sales, with customers substituting out of stock items for different brands.

One National Distribution Union employee has claimed that the company was paying more than three times what it would normally pay for distribution during the lock-out.

As the dispute entered its third week the locked out workers started to feel the effects of missing three pay cheques; one locked out worker, Virginia Watson, told TVNZ that she was now relying on donations to feed her kids: "It's really starting to hurt. The kids haven't had a decent meat and vegetable meal to eat for over a week now, been pretty hard for them." Progressive Enterprises estimated that the workers had collectively lost over $2 million in wages during the dispute.

On 24 October The Press reported that the dispute "took a toll on Australian parent company Woolworths, which reported flat sales in New Zealand for the first quarter"

== On the picket lines ==
Picketing workers in Christchurch stopping a Linfox truck

Progressive Enterprises workers, along with supporters, kept up continuous around-the-clock pickets at the distribution centres, as well as going out on "flying pickets" targeting the temporary distribution points set up by the company at supermarkets and distribution firms where people are handling goods that would normally be handled at the distribution centers. at the Palmerston North distribution centre. A permanent presence was set up at the site, with tents, a power generator, fridge, barbecue and portaloo. A representative from the Postal Workers Union added a letterbox to the campsite, saying that postal workers would deliver messages of solidarity sent directly to the picketers. Numerous arrests were made during the dispute, on 28 August union negotiator Stan Renwick was arrested; in Lower Hutt three picketers who were not employed by Progressive Enterprises were arrested at a Countdown supermarket after a stand off with a truck driver. During the third week of the dispute ten people were arrested on the picket line in Auckland after truck tires were punctured during a clash between picketers and a moving truck; National Distribution Union organiser Ingrid Beckers, who was one of the people arrested, told the New Zealand Herald that the truck had driven dangerously through the picket line and that the driver unwound his window and swung a metal pole around. According to Senior Sergeant Cornell Kluessien "Some were charged with disorderly behaviour, some with obstructing police and some with obstructing a roadway."

== Reactions ==
=== Union movement ===
At a special affiliates meeting of the New Zealand Council of Trade Unions, an organisation representing 350,000 New Zealand union members, a resolution was passed condemning the lock out and supporting the claims of distribution workers, resolving "That each union, separately and collectively, will continue to take every possible action to support the NDU, the EPMU and their distribution worker members to achieve a fair settlement of their dispute". The Maritime Union of New Zealand issued a statement pledging "financial, practical and moral support for the workers and their pickets" and threatened to stop unloading supermarket goods at the wharves. They also worked to gain international support for the locked out workers, including from the International Transport Workers' Federation, which represents 4,500,000 transport workers in 142 countries. Maritime union members voted to each contribute one hour of pay to the locked out worker fund each week until the dispute was settled. Over $425,000 was raised by the unions to support the locked out workers; a big part of this was $30,000 a week from one Auckland workplace with 1500 unionised staff and large donations from Australian unions the Maritime Union of Australia, the Transport Workers' Union and the Rail Tram and Bus Union. On 18 September representatives of these unions travelled to New Zealand to join the picket lines.

At an executive board meeting held in Singapore on 14–16 September, the ICFTU-APRO, part of the International Confederation of Free Trade Unions representing 30 million workers in the Asia-Pacific region condemned what it saw as "This heavy-handed pressure by a major corporate employer to force low-paid workers to relinquish their right to bargain collectively as guaranteed by ILO Conventions and New Zealand law."

=== Business community ===
Business lobby groups Business New Zealand and the Employers and Manufacturers Association both expressed concern that the dispute reflected a new style of ideological union claims, such as the claim for a national collective agreement. Employers and Manufacturers Associations Chief Executive Alasdair Thompson told National Radio "If they were to pull this off, then it could well lead to other situations where other employers who operate nationally see this sort of thing tried out against them." Business New Zealand chief executive Phil O'Reilly stated "I think the Progressive dispute is a very public way station of a trend towards more of this. The claim's not just about money, it's about structural stuff and bargaining issues that employers will find quite difficult to agree to," and claimed that if unions continue this approach to negotiations it would undoubtedly lead to more industrial disputes. An editorial in the Nelson Mail called the dispute "a disturbing reminder of the past, when unions had the power to shut down an entire industry – and sometimes used it."

=== Political response ===
The government did not make any official statement about the dispute, however one individual cabinet minister, Steve Maharey, whose electorate includes the Palmerston North distribution centre made a token donation of $200 to the unions locked out worker fund. EPMU leader Andrew Little challenged all members of parliament to match or beat this donation, though none did.

The opposition National Party put out a press release critical of the workers, mistakenly calling the industrial dispute a 'strike' when it was actually a lockout.

The Green Party urged the public to boycott Progressive Enterprises supermarkets until the dispute was resolved. The party's industrial relations spokesperson Sue Bradford stated in a press release "The Green Party is totally behind the locked-out workers. The right to form national collective agreements is a basic one which workers in many other industries have successfully attained. It is appalling to see Progressive Enterprises applying such brute economic force to prevent its workers from negotiating one,"

The Alliance supported the locked out workers by donating $500 and encouraging members of the party to match that donation. It also criticised the Labour government for remaining silent during the dispute. The Workers Party produced and distributed a bulletin supporting the locked out workers, and encouraging the public to donate to the locked out worker fund.

Socialist Worker raised $250 at a community picket of Foodtown Onehunga, and its activists in the Solidarity Union walked the picket line most days during the strike. The Workers' Charter newspaper published extensive coverage in its pages, also helping to raise the need for workers to challenge the ERA's anti strike laws and deliver illegal solidarity strike action to support those locked out.

== Settlement ==
Both sides of the dispute claimed victory when an agreement was reached between the company and the two unions representing its employees on 21 September. The majority of workers in Auckland and Palmerston North voted to accept the company's offer, however, the vote in Christchurch was close. The unions did not achieve one collective agreement for all three centres but NDU secretary Laila Harre said the terms were the same; "The most important thing for these workers was using their national bargaining power to deliver equal pay for equal work and they've done a stunning job of that," The agreement allowed for a 4.5% pay rise and pay parity between the four distribution centres by the end of 2008. Different sites' shift and roster systems were preserved but the system of allowances was streamlined to comprise a single base rate. The company also made available interest free loans of up to $1,000 to union members affected by the lock-out.

== After the dispute ==
In Christchurch a small group of workers refused to go back to work the day after a settlement was reached, instead going back to work the following Monday. NDU delegate Karl Skivington told National Radio that 49 per cent of workers there voted against accepting the deal from Progressive, and that many of them were "still angry" and in no mood to rush back to work for employers who had locked them out. On 12 October The Press reported that Marty Hamnett who had been CEO of Progressive Enterprises during the dispute, was leaving his position to "return to work in Australia for family reasons" Negotiations between Progressive Enterprises employees at the Southmore Meat Processing Plant represented by The Meat Workers Union continued after a settlement was reached for the workers at distribution centers, as of 20 October union negotiators had just come out of mediation with a deal to take back to the membership to be voted on. At the end of the year, each of the workers received a $100 Christmas bonus from their union, funded from the donations that came in after the dispute ended. On 21 March 2007 Progressive Enterprises was awarded the 2006 Roger Award, an award given by the organisations Campaign Against Foreign Control of Aotearoa and GATT Watchdog for the worst transnational corporation Operating in New Zealand. A spokesperson for CAFCA and GATT Watchdog stated:

It is no surprise that Progressive won the Roger because of that 6 September national lockout of its supermarket distribution centre workers, an all-out attack on its own workers, a naked attempt to smash the unions representing them and to starve those lowpaid workers into submission.

== See also ==
- Progressive Enterprises
- National Distribution Union
- EPMU
- Lockout (industry)
