= Terranova Homes & Care Limited v Service and Food Workers Union Nga Ringa Tota Incorporated =

2014 New Zealand Court of Appeal decision

- Court: Court of Appeal of New Zealand
- Decided: 28 October 2014
- Citation: [2014] NZCA 516

Court membership
- Judges sitting: O'Regan P, Stevens and French JJ

Keywords
- Human rights Discrimination Equal Pay Gender

Terranova Homes, also styled as TerraNova Homes and sometimes referred to as Terranova v Bartlett, was a decision of the New Zealand Court of Appeal concerning equal pay for women, and turned on the interpretation of the Equal Pay Act 1972, which was enacted in response to the 1971 report of the Commission of Inquiry into Equal Pay. It was alleged that the wages paid by TerraNova Homes & Care Ltd to its caregivers were lower than they would be if care giving of the aged were not work predominantly performed by women. The Court, by O'Regan P, Stevens and French JJ, directed counsel to participate in a directions conference for which the Court invited counsel to confer and file memoranda of proposed directions for further action by the lower court.

The case became a landmark ruling when a subsequent settlement negotiated by the government between the unions and employers was the first instance in New Zealand that acknowledges that in some industries, wages are lower because the work is mainly undertaken by women.

== Factual background ==
TerraNova operates rest home facilities in New Zealand. In 2009, 92 percent of the 33,000 workers in the aged care sector in New Zealand were women. In June 2012, 106 of the 110 caregivers employed by TerraNova were women. No party in the case contended that the four male caregivers were paid more than their female colleagues for doing the same work. However, the respondents argued that this did not mean equal pay exists, rather that the male caregivers' wages were reduced because care giving was seen as "women's work". Caregivers employed by TerraNova were paid between $13.50 and $15 per hour. Where each caregiver fell in that range was based on an assessment of their competence.

Two proceedings were brought against TerraNova in the Employment Court in 2013, both in relation to allegations that it paid its caregivers lower wages that it would otherwise pay if its work force was not predominantly made up of women. The first proceeding was brought by Kristine Bartlett, a rest home caregiver employed by TerraNova. Her statement of claim pleaded two causes of action: that TerraNova's failure to provide for equal pay breached the Equal Pay Act, and also that it breached schedule 1B of the Employment Relations Act 2000. She sought an order determining what rate would represent equal pay and an order amending her employment contract to reflect that rate. The second proceeding was brought by the Service and Food Workers Union Nga Ringa Tota Inc (the union), on behalf of 15 caregivers who were members of the union, and who considered the wage rates not to provide for equal pay within the meaning of the Equal Pay Act. The union sought a statement under s 9 of the Equal Pay Act of the general principles of equal pay. Individual employees do not have the right to make applications under s 9; this, the Court of Appeal assumed, was the reason that two separate proceedings were brought in the Employment Court. The Court of Appeal noted in its judgement that, "rather unhelpfully", the statement sought by the union consists simply of a restatement of the statutory provisions.

The court also noted that there was a regrettable lack of clarity in the way the Employment Court dealt with the preliminary questions. This was primarily caused by confusion as to which of the proceedings the Employment Court was referring to at various points in its judgement. It also failed to explain how it intended to carry out a s 9 application, or how a s 9 hearing would add to or differ from a determination of the claim already before them, filed by Ms Bartlett. Further complicating matters was that the Court of Appeal was being asked to decide on a question of law before a full examination of facts in a lower court. This required them to take an approach which did not prejudge the outcome of the following inquiry.

=== Difficulties of the parties ===
The court acknowledged three difficulties that were facing the parties, interveners and the Employment Court in this case. The first was the cumbersome syntax and "elliptical" drafting of the Equal Pay Act. The second problem was the ambiguity of the commission report which led to the act. The judges found this particularly unfortunate since the wording of s 3(1)(b) was essentially unchanged from the report, meaning that the report was of limited use to the parties, interveners and the courts. The final difficulty was the lack of existing case law on the matter.

== Question of law on appeal ==
Appeals to the Court of Appeal from the Employment Court are limited to questions of law, and leave must be granted for an appeal hearing to take place. The question of law in this case was altered by the Court of Appeal to better reflect the Employment Court's decision. The final question for determination was: "were the answers given by the Employment Court to the 1st and 6th questions at [118] of its decision wrong in law?"

== Judgment of the court ==
The judgment of the Court of Appeal was delivered by Justice French. The court dismissed TerraNova's appeal, upholding the Employment Court's decision.

=== Commission report ===
The report of the New Zealand Royal Commission of Inquiry into Equal Pay in 1971 (commission report) was relied on heavily by the Employment Court. However, the Court of Appeal found that it was sufficiently ambiguous so as to support all of the parties' competing interpretations. Therefore, it also found that the weight given to the report by the Employment Court was unjustified. The commission report recognised the "crowding of women" into lower-paying occupations, however it also suggests that the issue was equality opportunity, rather than pay equity. Systemic undervaluation of skills is not mentioned, nor is there any discussion of s 3 of the Government Service Equal Pay Act, which the Court of Appeal considered to be relevant. The commission rejected the United Kingdom's approach to equal pay with very little discussion, and rejected the Australian approach with little more. The report was also considered to be unhelpful because of its age, and the societal shift in attitude towards enterprise bargaining and away from centralised wage fixing and multi-employer agreements since it was written in 1971.

=== Text of the Equal Pay Act ===
The court identified that there are two separate categories within section 3(1) of the Equal Pay Act 1972, and that interpretation of the section must make a meaningful distinction between them. The phrase "would be" in s 3(1)(b) indicated that the comparator was intended by Parliament to be hypothetical, therefore causing the court to dismiss TerraNova's argument that the act was solely concerned with internal comparisons between male and female workers under the same employer.

Having decided that external comparators were allowed, the Judges then considered what sort of external evidence could be considered. They noted that s 3(1)(b) contained no restrictions other than to require that the evidence must be in relation to "a hypothetical male with the same or substantially similar skills, responsibility and service performing the work".

For completeness, the judges also included a brief discussion of section 4 of the act, which may influence an interpretation of s 3(1)(b). They concluded that it "raises more questions than it answers", and that it was of no practical assistance.

==== Arguments made by TerraNova ====
TerraNova made several arguments to establish that the Employment Court's interpretation of the act was not what Parliament intended. These included the title of the act, the use of the definite article in various sections, the phrase "under any instrument" in s 3(1) of the act, the exception in s 2(2) of the act, and the singular nature of the inquiry based on s 2A of the act. The court disagreed with all of these points. However, it was persuaded by TerraNova's final two arguments regarding the mandatory and exhaustive nature of the s 3(1)(b) criteria (although they did not agree that the Employment Court had attempted to insert an additional criterion), and that the comparator was a hypothetical male, not an actual or real male.

=== Workability, the absence of guidelines and section 9 ===
A "key plank of TerraNova's argument" was the principle that the court should select the interpretation that is most "practical and sensible". TerraNova claimed that individual employers should not have to "shoulder the burden of rectifying society-wide structural discrimination" or "undertake assessments that are simply beyond their expertise and resources". They argued that Parliament would have been clearer if it intended to impose such a significant burden on employers, and that the absence of guidelines was indicative of a lack of intention. TerraNova also relied heavily on s 9, which provides that the court "shall have power from time to time … to state … the general principles to be observed for the implementation of equal pay". The court felt, however, that s 9 was very open-ended. They considered its legislative history, which did not serve to clarify the section's meaning, and consequently found that "it is simply not possible to read the [Equal Pay Act] as a carefully drafted and well thought-out piece of legislation".

The court agreed with TerraNova that there were some workability concerns, however they disagreed that a lack of guidelines was demonstrative of Parliament's lack of intention to impose such a burden on employers. They agreed with the union and the Human Rights Commission that TerraNova's workability claim was overstated. Their Honours also found that the existence of s 9 of the Equal Pay 1972 was sufficient to "temper concerns about complexity and the lack of guidelines". The issue of workability was therefore not considered to be a determinative issue.

=== Existence of a settled interpretation ===
TerraNova made submissions to the Court which asserted that for 40 years the Equal Pay Act 1972 has been interpreted as a statute about equal pay, not pay equity. They also claimed that no determinations on the matter were made until the test case brought by the Clerical Workers Union in 1986, in which the Arbitration Court held that the act was limited to "ensuring equal pay between male and female employees covered by the same award"; the Court of Appeal disagreed, claiming that determinations were required as early as 1977. It was accepted that regardless of subsequent interpretations, s 3(1)(b) was difficult to interpret and implement. However, the Court of Appeal agreed with the Employment Court that the Clerical Workers Union decision was not definitive, and therefore that little weight could be placed on it.

=== Enactment and Repeal of Employment Equity Act ===
The enactment of the Employment Equity Act 1990 and its subsequent repeal by the Employment Contracts Act 1991 was argued by TerraNova to be indicative of Parliament's policy decision against legislating for pay equity; a decision which the courts should not subvert by reinterpreting the Equal Pay Act 1972. Citing similar arguments already rejected by the Employment Court, regarding the lack of assistance from comparing and attempting to construe the intentions of differently constituted Parliaments at different times, the Court of Appeal dismissed TerraNova's argument. They acknowledged the principle of legislative harmony, which gave some merit to TerraNova's suggestion that the Employment Court's interpretation of the 1972 Act was disruptive to the overall legislative scheme, and conceded that the Employment Court was too dismissive of this point. However, they ultimately concluded that the assistance this point provided was limited, and therefore not determinative of this issue; they therefore agreed with the Employment Court's decision on this point.

=== Employment Court's reliance on New Zealand Bill of Rights Act 1990 ===
The New Zealand Bill of Rights provides for the right to freedom from discrimination on the grounds of sex. The Employment Court found that TerraNova's interpretation of the Equal Pay Act 1972 would be inconsistent with the Bill of Rights, and therefore dismissed it. The Court of Appeal disagreed with that analysis. They held that "even on TerraNova's interpretation, the Act is not discriminatory", it merely narrows the scope of application the non-discrimination provision in the Bill of Rights.

=== Employment Court's reliance on New Zealand's international obligations ===
All parties acknowledged that the principles in the International Labour Organization (ILO) Convention Concerning Equal Remuneration for Men and Women Workers of Equal Value (Convention 100) extend beyond requiring equal pay for the same work. The Court of Appeal pointed to the presumption that Parliament does not intend to legislate contrary to New Zealand's international obligations, and therefore concluded that it is arguable that Parliament enacted the Equal Pay Act in order to comply with Convention 100, which it had ratified in 1983. However, given the general nature of the convention and the expansiveness of the interpretation of s 3(1)(b) of the act that it supports, their Honours held that it was of limited use to them in deciding this case.

=== Single source doctrine ===
Their Honours briefly discussed a submission from the Attorney-General regarding the "single source" doctrine established by the European courts. They held that there was a certain logic to it, but were not persuaded of its use in this particular case.

== Significance ==
Initially, little commentary existed on this case. It has been cited formally for its discussion of the New Zealand Bill of Rights Act 1990, as an authority for the general rule that subsequent statutes are irrelevant as an interpretive aid, and in relation to its discussion regarding the uniformity of language between two statutes. Martin Taylor of the Aged Care Association commented that the decision could have "catastrophic consequences for the sector if businesses were forced to pay workers a significant increase" as a result. Though it predates the TerraNova case, equal pay was also considered by the Human Rights Commission in May 2012.

Upon the Appeal Court's decision, the government announced that it would negotiate with the unions and employers to settle the equal pay claims. In return, the Engineering, Printing and Manufacturing Union, which at the same time merged with the Service and Food Workers' Union to become E tū (Māori: stand tall), held off further legal action. The result of the negotiations was announced on 18 April 2017 by the Minister of Health, Jonathan Coleman. The settlement would result in pay rises of up to NZ$5,000 for individual employees, and apply to 55,000 care givers. In total, the package would cost about NZ$2b to settle, and would likely result in higher Accident Compensation Corporation (ACC) premiums over time and increased rest home costs. It would also likely result in similar settlements being negotiated for other industries, although the Prime Minister, Bill English, cautioned that the health care sector was a unique industry and that there was a high bar to clear for the same conditions to apply to other groups. The settlement is the first instance in New Zealand that acknowledges that in some industries, wages are lower because the work is mainly undertaken by women.

== See also ==
- Gender pay gap in New Zealand
