= AUS =

AUS or Aus may refer to:

== Medicine ==
- Artificial urinary sphincter, a medical implant
- AUS (thyroid nodule diagnostic class)

== People and tribes ==
- Aus (surname)
- Banu Aus, one of the Arabian tribes who interacted with the Muhammed

== Places ==
- Aus, Namibia, a village in Karas Region, Namibia
- Australia, ISO 3166-1 alpha-3 country code
- Austria, UNDP country code

== Transportation ==
- Augusta and Summerville Railroad, a railroad in Georgia, United States
- Austin station, an MTR rapid transit station in Hong Kong, China on the Tuen Ma line
- Austin–Bergstrom International Airport, Austin, Texas, United States; IATA airport code
  - Robert Mueller Municipal Airport, Austin, Texas, United States formerly used IATA code AUS prior to its reassignment to Austin–Bergstrom International Airport

== Universities ==
- American University of Sharjah, United Arab Emirates
- Assam University, Silchar, India
- AUS, post-nominal letters for an Associate of the University of Surrey, United Kingdom

=== Athletics governance ===
- Atlantic University Sport, the governing body for university sport in Canada's Atlantic provinces

=== Student and staff unions ===
- Association of University Staff of New Zealand, merged in 2009 to form the New Zealand Tertiary Education Union
- Australian Union of Students, a former organization succeeded by the National Union of Students in 1987

== Other ==
- Ankh wedja seneb (Ā.U.S.), an ancient Egyptian phrase meaning "Life, Prosperity, Health"
- Aqueous urea solution, a component of diesel exhaust fluid
- Army of the United States, the wartime conscription component of the United States Army
- Aus rice, a type of rice grown in summer months
- Australian Aboriginal languages (ISO 639-2 and ISO 639-5 codes)
