= Occupy protests in New Zealand =

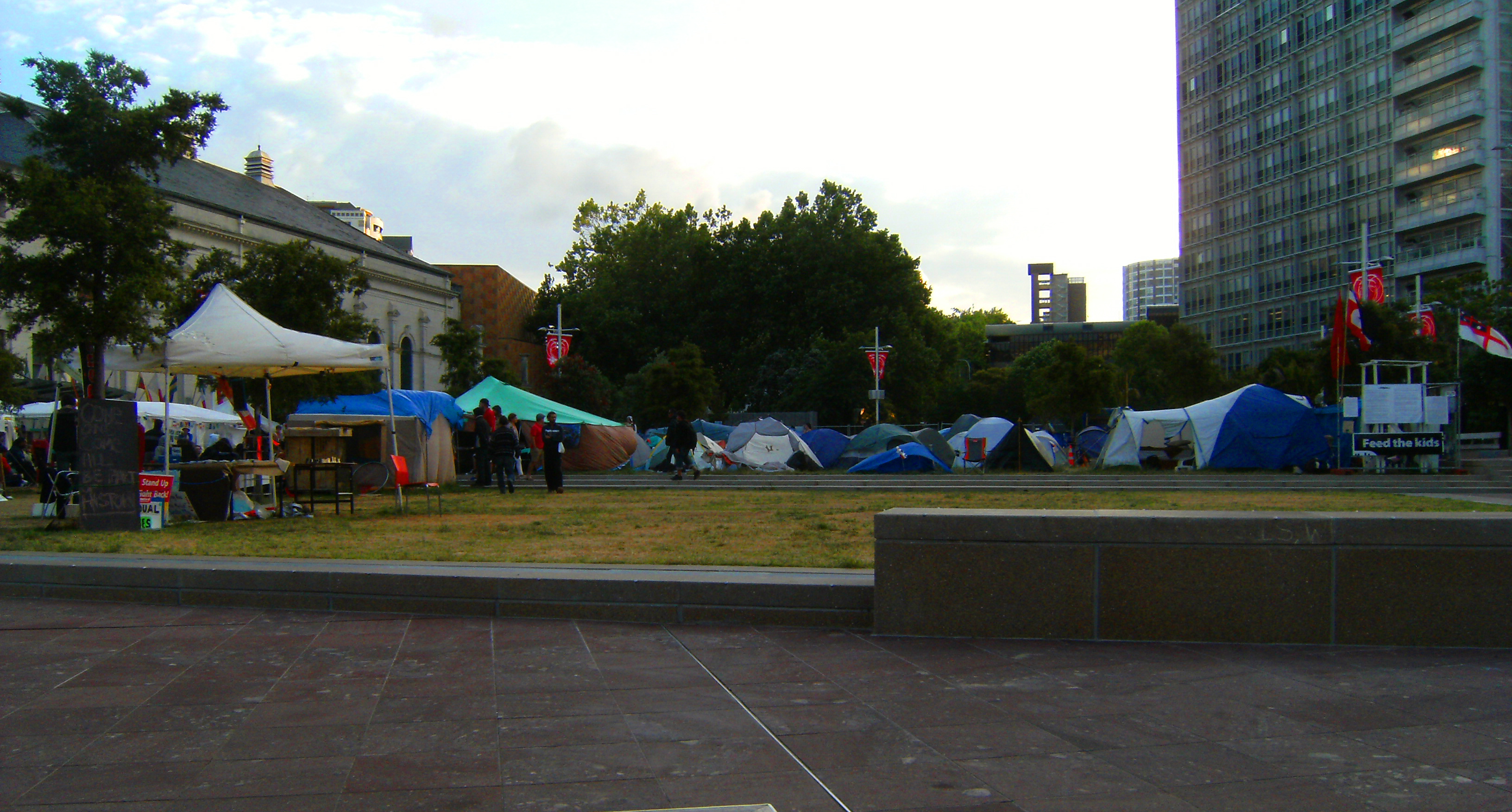
Occupy Auckland, 9 December 2011

Occupy Movement protests took place in New Zealand, beginning on 15 October 2011 with the Occupation of Auckland. Occupy protests took place in Auckland, New Plymouth, Wellington, Lower Hutt, Christchurch, Dunedin, and Invercargill.

== Overview ==
The Auckland Occupation was the largest of the Occupy Movement protests in New Zealand. Auckland had 350 occupiers at its peak, while Wellington, Christchurch, and Dunedin typically had fewer than 50. The success of the Auckland Occupation was largely attributable to the size of the city – nearly one third of all New Zealanders live in Auckland – and the involvement from the first moments by professional activists, trade unionists and the Mana Party. Other contributing factors included the concurrent Rugby World Cup and the impending 2011 New Zealand general election, held on 26 November 2011.

The occupations in New Zealand benefited from the existence of the New Zealand Bill of Rights, which protects free speech and free assembly. The Bill of Rights expressly anticipates the use of local bylaws to stifle and thwart political protests. The New Zealand Police made it clear that they did not wish to be used by local councils to repress peaceful democratic protests.

Dunedin City Council issued a trespass notice against its occupiers on 2 November. Auckland Council issued theirs on 28 November, followed immediately by a request for an injunction. Wellington and Christchurch Councils waited for the outcome of Auckland's injunction court case.

== Locations ==
- Auckland (began 15 October): Aotea Square, Albert Park, Victoria Park
- Christchurch (began 15 October): South Hagley Park
- Dunedin (began 15 October): The Octagon
- Wellington (began 15 October)

== Occupation of Aotea Square ==
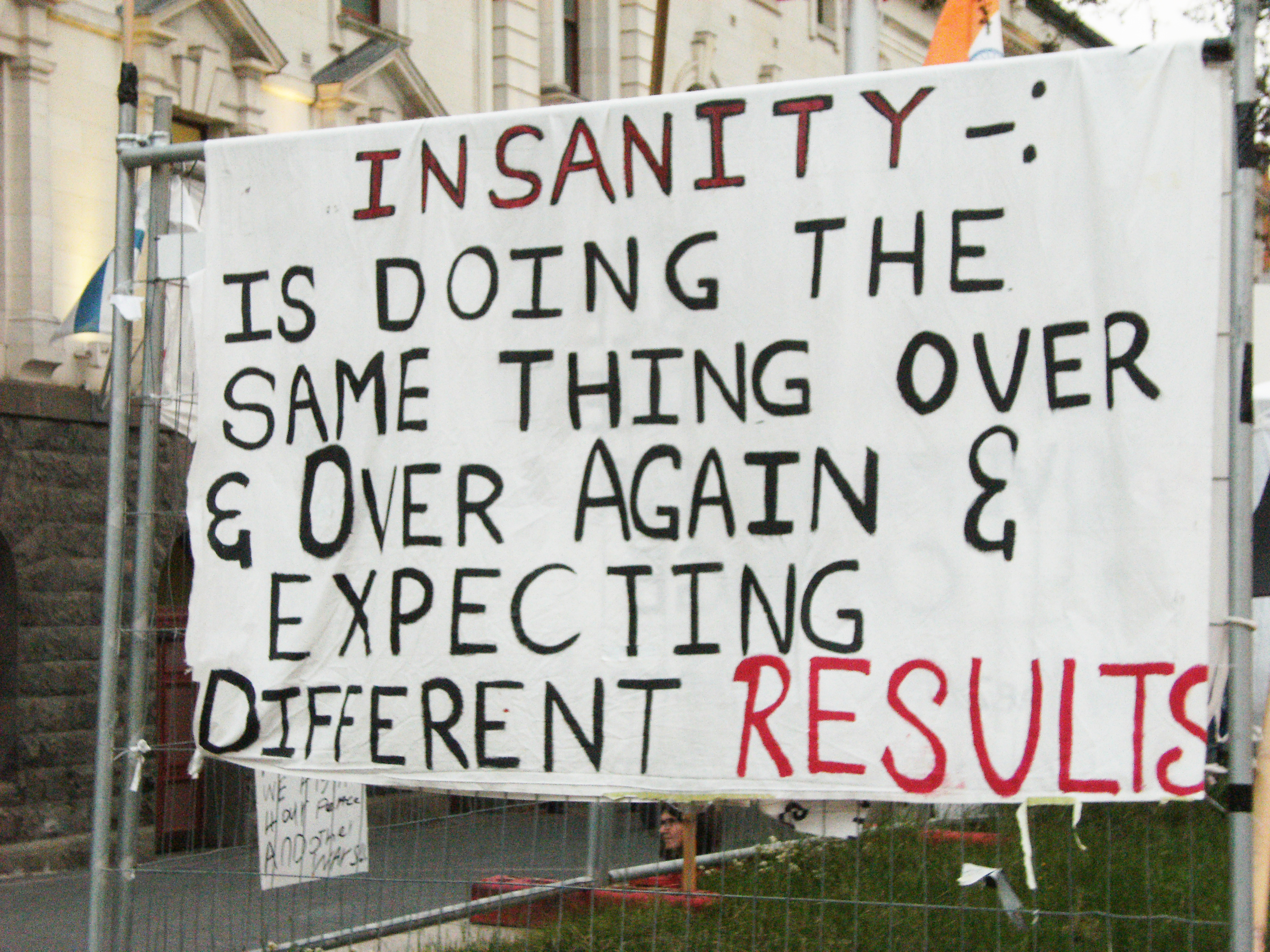
A banner posted in the area

=== History ===
==== Inception ====
Soon after the commencement of the Occupy Wall Street protests two groups attempted to simultaneously form an Auckland-based Occupation. The "Occupy Queen Street" and "Occupy Auckland" groups quickly amalgamated. The larger group, consisting of social justice groups, unions, student activists and political organisations, met at Unite Union on 7 October 2011. The following day, Saturday, 8 October, a meeting was held in the gazebo in Albert Park, attended by approximately 30 people under the auspices of "Occupy Auckland". Many of those in attendance were long-time activists, or represented various social constituencies, and some of the participants had been at both meetings. This first meeting laid the foundations for the association with the global Occupation Movement, the adoption of the principles of absolute adherence to peaceful non-violent resistance, fundamental leaderlessness and the formal adoption of the General Assembly processes. A motion to appoint a spokesperson for the group was initially rejected because, "a spokesperson is just another head to be lopped off by the press". The date set for the Occupation was 15 October, final location to be announced.

==== Organisation ====
A meeting was held in a cafe on K' Road the following day, where fliers, web pages and basic structures were created. During the remainder of the week, planning sessions and promotional activities were conducted, including the scouting of Aotea Square and Albert Park by four Town Planners. On Thursday of that week, the General Assembly finally chose Aotea Square of the two locations surveyed. Aotea Square was chosen for its political significance, its central location, and because it had recently been "taken" from the people of Auckland by "The Edge", and was no longer used as a marketplace and speakers' forum. Albert Park was seen as being less contentious, more centrally located in terms of the overall geography of the city, more suitable as a camp ground and closer to natural allies at the university; however, the site was rejected and at least two organisers dissented from the majority view in their preference for Albert Park.

==== Occupation ====
On 15 October, a march of over 2000 people set off from Britomart, up Queen Street to Aotea Square. A rally was held on arrival in the square, followed by a concert that evening after tents were set up. There were approximately 70 occupiers on the first night. Stiff resistance was anticipated, but apart from a misunderstanding with police, the Occupation began without incident.

Few of the original occupiers were homeless, or unemployed. Most were young professionals, students and members of the middle class. Many were experienced protesters and professional activists. The involvement of the trade union movement in the initial weeks of the occupation was significant. The Unite Union, First Union, the SWFU, the Mana Party and Legalise Cannabis Party were either directly involved, or members of their organisations came on their own time. Unaffiliated participants regularly expressed their gratitude for this support.

Over time however, for various reasons, this support began to drop off for reasons of other commitments, particularly the looming elections. By the fourth week of the occupation, Unite members were only irregular participants. Expected support in strength from the middle class did not materialise, although support off site was always strong. Donations began to drop off, in large part due to decisions made in the first days of the Occupation to use Facebook almost exclusively. The website was neglected, and so it became difficult for the public who were not familiar with Facebook to see what was needed and make donations. The Occupation became more or less invisible, except to approximately 5,000 Facebook friends, most of whom were not located in New Zealand. This error was compounded by the loss of a number of media-savvy personnel responsible for press releases. This loss was not off-set, even by the brief participation of Campbell Jones, an academic from the University of Auckland. The loss of support from the professional activist network gradually accelerated until the issuance of a trespass notice by Auckland Council.

==== Political contributions ====
After the immediate arrival at the camp site, work was divided roughly into three large categories: "Town Planning Activities", "Political Establishment" and "Group Activism". Those who had been heavily involved in the original organisation then began to distance themselves from their initial roles as logistical organisers in favor of more political involvement. In the first two weeks especially, key strategic and political goals identified prior to arrival at the square were carried out to ensure that the Occupation was truly established not only as a physical occupation, but primarily as a political event.

==== Call for unity of 16 October 2011 ====
The first political resolution of the Occupation was passed on 16 October. The resolution rejected antisemitism, islamophobia, racism and sexism, and called for unity between the 99%. The perceived position of the Occupation as a cosmopolitan forum and "neutral ground" required this. The resolution appears to have been a success, as no serious complaints were received.

==== Open letter to the Prime Minister of Australia, 22 October 2011 ====
Following the repression of the Occupation of City Square in Melbourne, the GA approved an open letter to the Prime Minister of Australia, denouncing the actions of the Victoria Police and calling for an end to the suppression of the Occupation Movement in Australia. This letter cited the "exemplary professionals" of the Auckland Council and the New Zealand Police, and suggested that the prime minister could take advice from these bodies, who to this point had a positive working relationship with the Occupation.

==== Declaration of the Occupation of Auckland, 3 November 2011 ====
On 3 November 2011, the Declaration of the Occupation of Auckland was ratified. This statement, which was workshopped heavily for 10 days, was addressed to the people of New Zealand, though it was understood that it would be read widely in government circles throughout the country. It was intended to express the justification of the Occupiers for their actions, "We wish you to hear those concerns which have driven us to make this Occupation. We do not do this lightly. For we live with the risk of arrest. We have put our reputations, our persons, our careers, our property and our relationships in jeopardy. We wish to impress upon you the depths of our determination and our sincerity."

The declaration was not intended to be a policy statement or political platform, though it does explain the purpose of the Occupation. It consists of an introduction, in the form of a Preamble, a list of formal Grievances, and a Call to Action, requesting the reader to judge for themselves whether the Occupiers are justified in their actions. Three choices of response were offered; to join, to support or to fight the Occupiers. The declaration concluded by appealing for the reader to come and help the Occupiers by reasoning together to discover solutions for the benefit of all New Zealanders. The Occupiers then declared a challenge, declaring that they would remain in the Square "until the 99% awaken".

The declaration was received enthusiastically by the Occupiers and was ratified unanimously. Five days after it was ratified, it was printed and laminated on A0 and posted on three sides of the Occupation. Most visitors were observed to read it in its entirety.

In the weeks that followed its ratification, criticisms of the declaration began to emerge, though there was no serious or concerted attack on the document, and support remained strong. A few persons outside of the Occupation felt that key issues were not represented, pertaining particularly to indigenous rights and ecological concerns. Others felt that it was difficult to read. It was also criticised as being "too American", because of its resemblance to the OWS Declaration and its echoing of sentiments found in the Declaration of Independence. Its strong language and unambivalent tone and its enumeration of grievances rather than political solutions was considered to be out of character with other more traditional New Zealand political statements. However, when the grievances are removed, parallels between the Declaration and the Declaration of the Independence of New Zealand can be observed. Similarities between the two documents include the citation of the authority of the framers and the strong reference to logical assertion of sovereignty, a common theme in populist political thought in New Zealand. The author of the Auckland Declaration was unaware of the New Zealand Declaration of Independence at the time, and so these similarities are best attributed to the familiarity of both authors with the common roots of Western political democracy.

TO THE PEOPLE OF AUCKLAND AND NEW ZEALAND; we the Citizens and Residents in Occupation in Aotea Square wish to communicate a few of our grievances, space being limited, so that you may judge for yourselves whether we are right in our cause.

There is much that is excellent and good about our country. But we are not Subjects who must go quietly and obey. We are free and proud New Zealanders and people of Aotearoa. It is required that our government answer to our Collective Voice. Not when it suits them, once every three years, but whenever the General Will of the People is made known, no matter how that may occur.

We wish you to hear those concerns which have driven us to make this Occupation. We do not do this lightly. For we live with the risk of arrest. We have put our reputations, our persons, our careers, our property and our relationships in jeopardy. We wish to impress upon you the depths of our determination and our sincerity.

Consequently, in Solidarity with all other peaceful Occupiers around the world, we declare;

It is unacceptable to us that 1% of the population should own and control a disproportionate amount of the wealth of our country. We find such greed and injustice abhorrent, as is the suffering it causes our people.

We resent that we, the 99% should pay for the greed and the folly of this 1%. We reject out of hand the austerity measures our politicians are preparing to saddle us with.

We can have no sympathy for the rich while more than 200,000 of our children live every day in hopeless poverty. There can be no peace for the 1% while our children suffer and go to bed hungry.

We also decry the shameless exploitation and manipulation of our young people for profit by companies selling them unhealthy foods and debilitating products. It must stop. As parents, we are aggrieved that our children's health and well-being is threatened by these outside influences beyond our ability to control.

Nor will we accept that our elderly parents, who worked and paid taxes all of their lives, should now live in fear that their pensions and their access to quality medical care should be threatened.

We repudiate the policy whereby all young New Zealanders must now pay for a University education which past generations received for free; the quality of our democracy is dependent upon the universal education of its citizenry.

We denounce the practice whereby young people are expected to work for nothing as Interns, or languish in dead-end jobs because companies refuse to pay for vocational training.

It is a scandal that our young families cannot afford to buy a home, and that devious lenders are allowed to trap them in a lifetime of debt slavery.

We refuse to accept the artificially high levels of unemployment and reduced working conditions which have been forced upon us by the Architects of Globalisation.

We also denounce the destructive, systemic undermining of our economic self-sufficiency, the flooding of our local markets with cheap goods from overseas at the expense of local producers, the irrevocable sale to faceless foreign corporations of our precious lands and resources, and the shameless lack of social conscience exhibited by some of our companies.

Finally, and most grievously, we abhor the disproportionate control of our political institutions and our media by the 1%. For from this one malignant tendency, a multitude of injustices proceed. We therefore state as a governing principle that as companies and corporations are not natural persons, they shall not be entitled to protection under our Bill of Rights, and they may not act to influence our political processes for their own ends.

We, the Citizens and Residents occupying Aotea Square call on you to consider our grievances and respond in whatever way your Reason and your Conscience dictates.

If it is to join us, then join us. If it is to support us, support us. But if it is to fight us, then come not with ignorant insults, or force of arms to do violence on account of petty regulations. Come instead to right the injustices we protest, and we will gladly welcome you.

Come reason with us. Come add your voice to ours. Come help us find a better way.

The old ideas, the old systems, the old ways of thinking have set our society on an unsustainable path. We need to set a new course that insures us and our children a future.

We are here, and here we stay, till we have finally roused the 99% from its long and troubled slumber.

In Solidarity, The General Assembly of the Occupation of Auckland.

=== Social justice actions ===
==== Occupation of the University of Auckland Clock Tower, 17 October 2011 ====
Approximately 200 student activists from the We are the University Movement occupied the clock tower of the University of Auckland for several hours, until police arrived with dogs and threatened to make mass arrests. After leaving the clock tower the students marched to the Occupy encampment.

==== Feeding the homeless ====
As the first Occupiers were for the most part neither homeless nor unemployed, the level of donations were more than adequate to cover the needs of the Occupation, and standards were very high. However, as word got around in Queen Street that the Occupation was providing three hot meals a day to all comers, the homeless began coming to the camp, swelling numbers. At its peak, the Occupation fed 350 people three meals a day. Many of the homeless assumed responsibility in overseeing and performing kitchen and cooking duties, replacing the original Unite Members who set it up initially. Eventually, it became impossible to feed so many people for free, and a nominal charge was instituted of $1 per meal, well within the means of everyone at the camp.

=== History ===
Occupy protests, events and actions also occurred in the New Zealand city of Dunedin.

== Notable people ==
- Abe Gray, participated in Occupy Dunedin. Gray is the founder of the Whakamana Cannabis Museum and a high-profile cannabis activist and protester for almost two decades

== See also ==
- Economy of New Zealand
- List of global "Occupy" protest locations
- List of protests in New Zealand
