= Malcolm Burns =

New Zealand agricultural scientist, university lecturer and administrator

Sir Malcolm Burns KBE
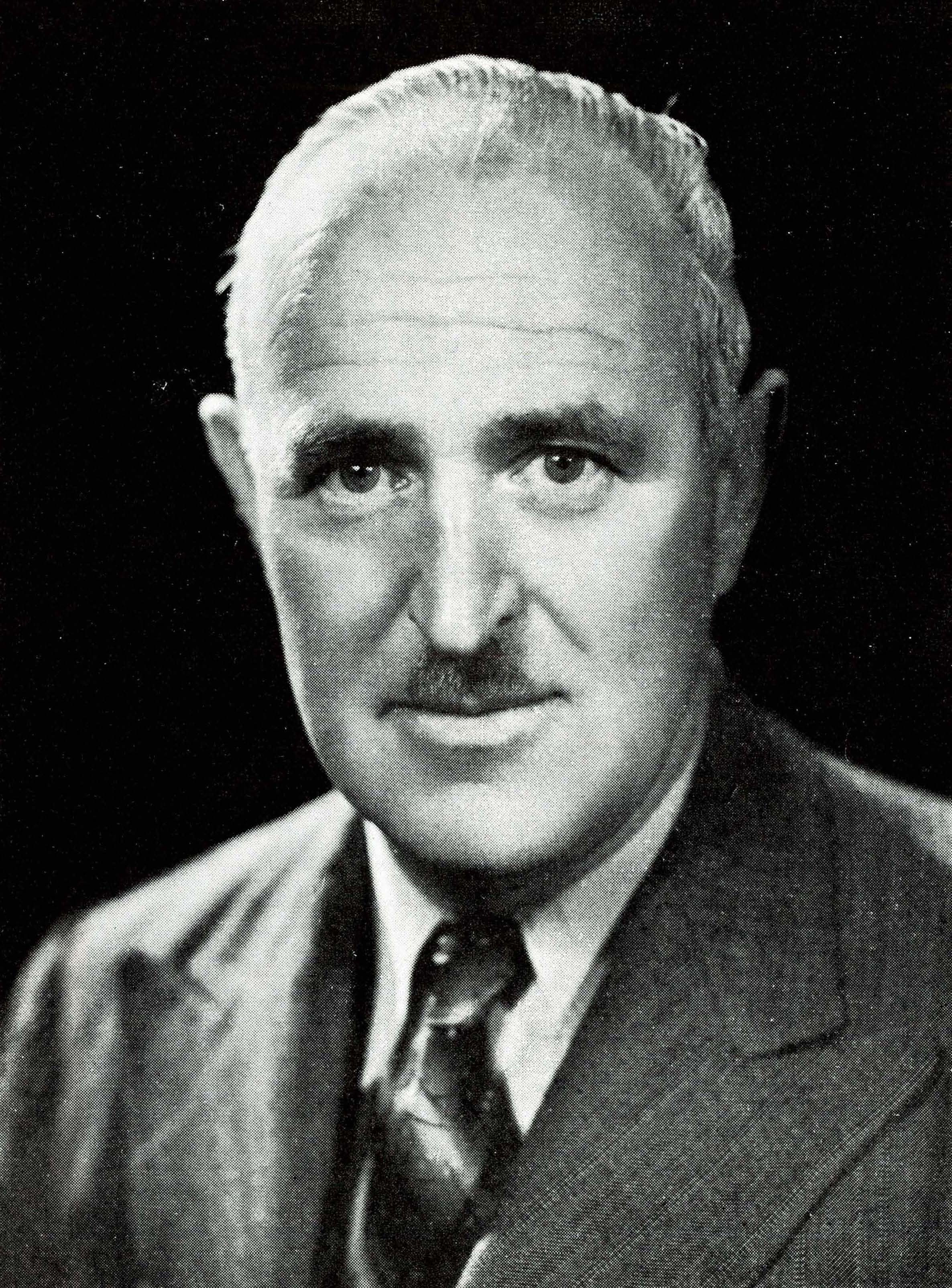
- Burns in 1952
- Born: Malcolm McRae Burns; 19 March 1910; Ashley, New Zealand
- Died: 17 October 1986 (aged 76); Christchurch, New Zealand
- Education: Canterbury University College – MSc; University of Aberdeen – PhD
- Spouse: Ruth Alvina Waugh (m. 1936)
- Children: 3, including Carolyn Burns
- Scientific career
- Fields: Agricultural scientist
- Workplaces: Lincoln College
- Thesis: A study of soil conditions and vegetation in certain selected areas of northeast Scotland with a view to their economic development (1934)
- Doctoral advisors: Albert William Borthwick; William Gammie Ogg

Sir Malcolm McRae Burns KBE (19 March 1910 – 17 October 1986) was a New Zealand agricultural scientist, university lecturer and administrator.

== Early life, education, and family ==
Burns was born in Ashley Bank, North Canterbury, on 19 March 1910, the son of Emily Burns (née Jeffrey) and John Edward Burns. He was educated at Rangiora High School, and then studied at Canterbury University College, graduating Master of Science in 1932. He won a doctoral scholarship to the United Kingdom, and completed a PhD, supervised by Albert William Borthwick and William Gammie Ogg, at the University of Aberdeen in 1934; the title of his thesis was A study of soil conditions and vegetation in certain selected areas of northeast Scotland with a view to their economic development. He then spent two years as a research fellow at Cornell University in upstate New York under the auspices of a Commonwealth Fund fellowship, during which time he met and married Ruth Alvina Waugh. The couple went on to have three children, including zoologist Carolyn Burns.

== Academic career ==
Returning to New Zealand, Burns spent a short period as a plant physiologist at the Department of Scientific and Industrial Research, before joining Canterbury Agricultural College in 1937 as a lecturer. After World War II, he led the revival of Association of University Staff of New Zealand (later Association of Staff in Tertiary Education, now the Tertiary Education Union). In 1952, he became director of the college, and in 1962, the institution was renamed Lincoln College, and Burns's title changed to principal.

Burns retired from Lincoln in 1974, and his legacy is that he gave it its strong research focus, which has gained international recognition. In the same year, he was awarded an honorary doctorate of science (DSc) from the University of Canterbury.

== Honours and awards ==
In 1953, Burns was awarded the Queen Elizabeth II Coronation Medal, and in 1977 he received the Queen Elizabeth II Silver Jubilee Medal. In the 1959 New Year Honours, Burns was appointed a Commander of the Order of the British Empire. He was promoted to Knight Commander of the same order, for outstanding services to the community, in the 1972 Queen's Birthday Honours.

Burns was elected a Fellow of the Royal Society of New Zealand in 1963. He was also a Fellow of the New Zealand Institute of Chemistry, the New Zealand Institute of Agricultural Science, and the American Association for the Advancement of Science.

== Death and legacy ==
Burns retired to Christchurch, where he died on 17 October 1986. Lincoln became an independent university in 1990; the Burns Wing on Lincoln's campus commemorates him.
