= Ruth Chapman (trade unionist) =

Ruth Chapman (born 1950 or 1951) is a New Zealand unionist and Labour Party worker. She was the president of the Post Primary Teachers' Association in the late 1980s and led negotiations with the State Services Commission over teachers' pay and conditions.

Chapman is the convenor of Southern Labour, which represents the five southern general electorate seats as well as Te Tai Tonga.
