= Meat Union Aotearoa =

Trade union in New Zealand

- Meat Union Aotearoa Inc.
- Founded: August 1, 1994
- Headquarters: Auckland, New Zealand
- Location: New Zealand
- Members: 10,000 (peak season)
- Key people: Mike Nahu, president
- Affiliations: NZCTU
- Website: www.meatunion.org.nz

The Meat Union Aotearoa is a trade union in New Zealand. It was formed 1 August 1994 by the merging of the Auckland & Tomoana Freezing Workers Union and the West and East Coast Branches of the New Zealand Meat & Related Trades Workers Union.

The Meat Union has a membership of approximately 10,000 during the peak season, and is affiliated with the New Zealand Council of Trade Unions. It is directly organized with the NZ Meat & Related Trades Workers Union.
