= Clothing, Laundry and Allied Workers Union of Aotearoa =

Trade union in New Zealand

CLAW
- Clothing, Laundry and Allied Workers Union of Aotearoa
- Headquarters: Wellington, New Zealand
- Location: New Zealand
- Members: 750
- Key people: Maxine Gay, secretary
- Affiliations: NZCTU

The Clothing, Laundry and Allied Workers Union of Aotearoa (CLAW) was a trade union in New Zealand. It had a membership of around 750, and was affiliated with the New Zealand Council of Trade Unions. In 2007, it merged with the National Distribution Union.
