= PPTA =

PPTA may refer to:

- Ping Pong the Animation
- Post Primary Teachers' Association, a teachers' trade union in New Zealand
- Patliputra Junction railway station, in India
- para-Aramid or p-phenylene terephthalamide
- probabilistic, polynomial-time algorithm
