= Juken New Zealand =

Japanese forestry company

Juken New Zealand, formerly known as Juken Nissho is a Japanese-owned forestry company operating in New Zealand.

== History ==
Juken Nissho was formed for the 1990 purchase of licences to run previously publicly owned forests covering nearly 600 km² of Northland, the Wairarapa and East Cape. It operates plants at Kaitaia, Masterton and Gisborne and employs around 1,000 New Zealanders largely as labourers.

At present Juken Nissho controls around 550 km² of Pinus radiata, Douglas-fir and Corsican pine. Juken New Zealand manufactures and markets timber panel products under the Triboard, Spaceboard and Strandboard brands. Triboard, conceived in the 1980s, competes with older technologies such as particleboard and MDF.

In late March 2026, Juken New Zealand proposed closing its two timber mills in Kaitaia if it could not find a buyer. The Workers First Union deputy secretary Anita Rosentreter expressed concern that the proposed mill closures would lead to significant job losses in the town. In early April 2026, Northland Member of Parliament Grant McCallum said that a group of investors were negotiating with Juken to purchase the two Kaitaia timber mills.

In mid-July 2026, Juken New Zealand director Yasufumi Tsuchiya confirmed that its Northland wood veneer mill would be closed down by 21 August after failing to find a buyer for the mill. The closure of the Northland Mill is expected to affect 60 jobs, with workers being offered redeployment and re-training opportunities. Tsuchiya confirmed that Juken was in the process of negotiating the sale of its Triboard Mill in Northland, which employs 140 workers.

On 11 November 2026, Juken New Zealand confirmed plans to cease operations at its Triboard Mill in Kaitaia after being unable to find a buyer willing to purchase the entire business. The company also commenced consulting staff on two proposals: firstly, selling the mill's land, buildings and assets to a prospective buyer currently in negotiations with Juken; and secondly, closing the mill and liquidating its property and associated assets. Executive director Yasufumi Tsuchiya attributed the proposals to commercial pressure including a weaker demand for wood products in key markets, rising costs and not enough work to sustain current operations. Consultation is expected to close on 25 November. Workers First Union organiser Marcus Coverdale said that some of the affected 140 workers has been deployed from the closed Northland wood veneer factory and expressed concern that they faced risk of a second redundancy.

== Criticism ==
Juken Nissho states it has invested over $700 million New Zealand dollars in the country, but has attracted criticism from unions and the political left for alleged pollution, for disregard of employees and for the funding arrangement by which the investment was made, (it was alleged the Japanese investors founded a limited liability company to buy New Zealand assets using the assets as the only security, without committing any capital or taking on any risk). Juken Nissho was successfully prosecuted by the Northland Regional Council for discharge of contaminants into air in 1998 and won the Roger Award for The Worst Transnational Corporation in New Zealand in 2003, however has since significantly reduced emissions, increased safety and made major efforts to become more environmentally friendly. Juken has also had 20 health and safety convictions over the last two decades and has been sentenced again (2019) at the Kaitaia District Court, following an incident which saw a worker suffer serious steam burns. The previous incident in July 2017, also involved a steam related injury when a worker, who was replacing a heat probe inside an enclosed Triboard manufacturing press, was engulfed in hot steam.
