= Farse =

Farse may refer to:

- Farsa (plural farse), a genre of opera
- Farse (band), a five-piece ska-punk band from Birmingham in the West Midlands of England

== See also ==
- Farce, an exaggerated comedy genre
- Farsa (disambiguation)
