= List of protests in New Zealand =

This is a list of protests in New Zealand.

== Protests relating to the Treaty of Waitangi ==
The Treaty of Waitangi was between the Māori and the British Crown and was first signed in 1840.

Year	Day	Name	People	Location	Notes	Image
1844–1845		Hōne Heke's protests	1	Russell	Protest against the British Crown by repeatedly chopping down flag pole. Eventually leading to the New Zealand Wars.	
1845–1872		The New Zealand Wars		North Island	A series of conflicts between the British crown, its allies and various Maori tribes.	
1881	5 November (invasion of government troops)	Parihaka pacifist settlement		Taranaki	Pacifist settlement invaded by government troops and many prisoners taken without trial.	
1898		Dog Tax War		Northland	Threat of armed civil disobedience over disproportionate taxation.	
1975	13 October	Māori Land March	5000	Auckland	March from Northland to Wellington to increase public awareness.	
1977–1978	ended 25 May	Bastion Point protest (Ngāti Whātua land claim)		Auckland	Police and army personnel removed 222 people	
1984		Kia Ora Incident	1		Fired after insistence on using the greeting Kia Ora.	
2004		Foreshore and seabed Hīkoi		Nationwide	Protest over the seabed and foreshore being declared public land.	
2004		Tim Selwyn axe protest	1	Auckland	Charged with sedition	
2006	6 February	Waitangi protest		Northland		
2007	15 October	New Zealand police raids		Ruatoki and throughout the country	Several people charged as terrorists, but not found guilty for that offence. Extensive protest over the police handling of the investigation.	
2014		New Zealand war memorial day petition	12,000	Nationwide	Petition to raise awareness of the New Zealand wars by creating a memorial day	
2023	5 December 2023	Government policy protest		North Island	A Te Pāti Māori organised protest regarding the National-led government policy changes.	
2024	10-19 November 2024	Hīkoi mō te Tiriti		North Island		

== Environmental protests ==
Year	Day	Name	People	Location	Notes	Image
1959–1972		Save Manapouri campaign	264,907 signed (1970)	Southland, nationwide	Largely successful in reducing the effect on the lake	
1960's-1980's		Nuclear-free protests		Nationwide		
2001	September	Anti genetic engineering	10,000	Auckland	resulting in a moratorium	
2004–2007		Save Happy Valley Coalition		West Coast	Anti coal mine protests	
2004–2007		Marsden B protest		Northland		
2010	2 May	Opposing mining on conservation land	40,000	Auckland	One arrest made	

== Protests against employers ==
This list contains notable protests against employers either for the disruption caused or their results on society and working conditions. It also includes protests against the government when it is in the role of an employer. As in a ten-year period from 2005–2015 there were an average of 25 strikes a years this list does not seek to cover every such protest.,

Year	Day	Name	People	Location	Notes	Image
1890	Ended 10 November	Maritime strike		Ports around the country and Australia	First nationwide strike	
1908		Blackball strike		West Coast		
1913–1914		The Great Strike	14,000-16,000 on strike	Started in Huntly coal mines and Wellington port	Unionists against employers	
1943	25 February	Featherston prisoner of war protest and massacre	240 (49 killed, 70 wounded)	Wellington	Japanese prisoners of war refused to work and may have rioted.	
1951	13 February to 15 July	Waterfront dispute		Nationwide		
1978		Mangere Bridge dispute		Auckland		
1979		General strike	300,000 (max)	Nationwide		
2006		supermarket workers’ dispute		Nationwide		
2008		Junior doctors’ strike		Nationwide		

== Protests for or against social change ==
Year	Day	Name	People	Location	Notes	Image
1879		Orange ‘riot’		Timaru and Christchurch	Sectarian unrest	
1893		Women's suffrage petition	32,000 signatures		Women's suffrage followed late that year	
1908	November	No License Campaign		Dunedin		
1916	November			Blackball	miners went on strike to oppose military conscription.	
1917	October	Paddy Webb	1	West Coast	Webb, a Member of Parliament, opposed conscription and when called up refused military service. He was court-martialled and sentenced to two years' hard labour and his seat was declared vacant.	
1943	3 April	Battle of Manners Street	1000 (total)	Wellington	Some of the American servicemen from the American South in the Services Club objected to the presence of Māori soldiers.	
1971		Anti-Vietnam War protest	35,000	Nationwide		
1973	24 March	Battle of Harewood	23 arrests	Harewood Airport and the nearby Weedons Stores Depot	People from Citizens for Demilitarisation of Harewood, Campaign Against Foreign Control of Aotearoa and Anti-Bases Campaign, invaded two Operation Deep Freeze air defence bases. The violent clashes were the first anti-spy base demonstration in NZ and could be viewed as a forerunner to the Waihopai Station arrests	
1977	May and December	Abortion-rights marches		Wellington and Christchurch	Protest against the amendment to the Contraception-Sterilisation and Abortion Bill	Logo of Abortion Law Reform Association of New Zealand
1981		Springbok tour		Nationwide		
1985		Coalition of Concerned Citizens	800,000 signatures (claimed)		Opposition to the Homosexual Law Reform Act 1986	
2003	February	Anti Iraq War	10,000	Auckland and Wellington		
2004	August	Enough is Enough march	10,000	Wellington	Opposition to the government's proposed Civil Union Bill	
2005		Black caps tour of Zimbabwe				
2008	April	Ploughshares Aotearoa	3	Waihopai Station		
2009		New Zealand Internet Blackout				
2011		SlutWalk		Auckland and Wellington		
2011		Occupy movement		Major centres	Protests during the Great Recession.	
2012		Against gay marriage	250			
2018	26 July	Abortion availability		Wellington		
2022	Sunday, 6 February	Thousands protest against the vaccine mandates at the parliament grounds in Wellington and Picton		Welllington and Picton		
2024	Sunday, 23 October	Protests against government policies over worker's rights		All of New Zealand		

== See also ==
- COVID-19 protests in New Zealand
- List of environmental protests
- List of massacres in New Zealand
- List of protests in the United States by size
