= Elizabeth Orr =

New Zealand lecturer and university chancellor (1929–2021)

Elizabeth Welch Orr CNZM (29 October 1929 – 22 April 2021, née Entrican) was a New Zealand lecturer and a previous Chancellor of Victoria University of Wellington. Orr was also a trade union leader and advocate for pay equity.

== Life ==
Orr was the daughter of civil engineer and forestry administrator Pat Entrican. She attended Samuel Marsden Collegiate between 1936 and 1942, and Nga Tawa Diocesan between 1944 and 1946. Orr completed her undergraduate Bachelor of Arts in English and French at Victoria University of Wellington in 1951. After graduating her postgraduate Master's in English with First Class Honours in 1954, she continued working at the University within the English department as both a tutor and lecturer.

== University administrative career ==
Between 1967 - 1980 Orr was the first woman to serve as Executive Secretary of the Association of University Teachers. Orr became a member of the Victoria University of Wellington Council in 1986, and continued on to become the Pro-Chancellor in 1990. Between 1991 and 1995 she served as the University’s Chancellor - the first female to do so.

== Equity work ==
Orr contributed to the formation of the National Advisory Council for the Employment of Women, where she served as chair between 1971 and 1979, advocating for the Equal Pay Act in 1972. Orr was a member of the Equal Opportunity Tribunal, and between 1975 and 1978 she served on the Equal Pay Committee. Additionally, Orr contributed to the legal arguments for the 2014 pay equality case Terranova Homes & Care Limited v Service and Food Workers Union Nga Ringa Tota Incorporated.

== Later life ==
Orr married Secretary for Justice and Waitangi Tribunal member Gordon Orr. in 1997 Elizabeth Orr became a Companion of the New Zealand Order of Merit, for services to education and the community. In the same year she was also made an honorary Doctor of Literature by the Victoria University of Wellington Council. Orr held conservationist views around the protection of native fauna in New Zealand and in 2017 she published a history of the New Zealand Forest Service, including detailing her father's work as Director of Forestry between 1939 and 1961.

Orr died in Wellington on 22 April 2021 aged 91.

== Publications ==
- "Pay Packets & Stone Walls: A Memoir of Women's Causes and Love of the Land"
- "Women at work: a Guide to Employment and Training Opportunities for Women Returning to Work" (1968)
- "Keeping New Zealand Green: Our Forests - and Their Future" (2017)
