= National Distribution Union =

NDU
- National Distribution Union
- Merged into: First Union New Zealand
- Founded: 1986
- Dissolved: 2011
- Headquarters: Auckland, New Zealand
- Location: New Zealand
- Members: 20,000
- Key people: Robert Reid, general secretary
- Affiliations: NZCTU
- Website: www.ndu.org.nz

The National Distribution Union (NDU) was a national trade union in New Zealand. It was formed in 1986 as the Northern Distribution Union by the merger of The Northern Drivers Union, The Northern Stores and Warehouse Union, The Auckland and Gisborne Shop Employee Union, and The Northern Butchers and Grocers Union. A further merging of seven South Island unions led to the renaming to the National Distribution Union, the union's final name before its 2011 amalgamation into First Union New Zealand.

The NDU has a notable history as a militant union, thanks to its industrial strategy of strike action and longtime leader Bill (Gordon Harold) Andersen.

The NDU had a membership of more than 20,000 and was affiliated with the New Zealand Council of Trade Unions. It was also affiliated to various international federations through its four sectors; Retail & Entertainment, Transport Energy Stores, Textile Clothing Baking and the Wood Sector.

The union was involved, along with the EPMU, in the high-profile 2006 Progressive Enterprises dispute, where union members were locked out after strike action.

The NDU amalgamated with Finsec to create a new union called First Union New Zealand in 2011.
