= E tū =

New Zealand trade union

- Founded: 2015
- Merger of: Service & Food Workers Union; Flight Attendants and Related Services Union; Engineering, Printing and Manufacturing Union
- Location: New Zealand
- Key people: Rachel Mackintosh (National Secretary)
- Affiliations: NZCTU; Labour Party
- Website: etu.nz

E tū is a New Zealand trade union created in October 2015 through the merger of the Service & Food Workers Union, the Flight Attendants and Related Services Union, and the Engineering, Printing and Manufacturing Union at a time when many unions in the country had been amalgamating and developing new strategies in the face of declining membership and challenging relations in a changing labour market. Affiliated with the New Zealand Labour Party and other union groups in the country and overseas, E tū advocates within the relevant legislation for fair pay agreements, better conditions, and health and safety for workers in a range of industries. Members of E tū were involved in a long process that resulted in a review of the Equal Pay Act 1972 that led to the establishment of processes for establishing pay equity. The passing of the Fair Pay Agreements Bill (2022) enabled the union to achieve significant success for cleaners and security guards in New Zealand. As of 31 March 2021, E tū Incorporated had 48,624 members.

== Background and establishment ==
On 15 May 1991, the New Zealand Government passed the Employment Contracts Act. The legislation deregulated the labour market in what was seen as a continuation of the free market reforms of the previous Labour Government. National awards no longer applied and negotiations between unions and employers for collective agreements became increasingly difficult as the country moved from what was almost compulsory unionism to every employee being either on an "individual contract, or on a single-employer collective agreement". Jim Bolger, the then Prime Minister, said the legislation was designed to reduce the impact strikes were having on New Zealand at the time, but Brian Roper from University of Otago held that the reforms gained traction because union bargaining power had been diminished by high unemployment, and a decentralised system allowed employers to offer poorer wages and conditions. Roper concluded: "It was really the largest defeat suffered by the union movement in Aotearoa since the maritime strike of 1890, and it fundamentally reshaped the legislative framework for employment relations." The Centre for Labour, Employment and Work at Victoria University of Wellington collected data on union membership each year in New Zealand from 1991 and the results showed a major reduction in union membership and density in the country which as of 2016, had still not recovered to their pre-1991 levels. With the return of a Labour Government in 1999 under Helen Clark, the Employment Contracts Act was repealed and replaced with the Employment Relations Act (2000). This legislation was seen as more 'union-friendly', but non-union members were still able to take advantage of the gains negotiated by the union.

The work done by Ryall et al. demonstrated that while between 2006 and 2016 there remained nine or ten unions in New Zealand with 10,000 or more members there was a growing move toward amalgamation in spite of declining overall union membership. The paper noted: "The Engineering, Printing and Manufacturing Union (EPMU) merged with the NZ Building Trades Union. In 2015 the NZ Public Service Association merged with the Southern Local Government Officers Union and E Tū was formed from the amalgamation of the Service and Food Workers Union and the EPMU. The Flight Attendants and Related Services Association (FARSA) were also finalising their amalgamation with E tū at the end of 2015." Prior to the formation of E tū, on 12 March 2015, Engineering, Printing and Manufacturing Union (EPMU) national secretary Bill Newson reported that the union had seen growth for the first time in 12 years.

There was considerable response from the New Zealand media to the formation of E tū. It was described as "the largest private sector union in New Zealand...[representing]...more than 50,000 working New Zealanders in industries as diverse as aviation, construction, journalism, food manufacturing, mining and cleaning". Bill Newson, E tū's national secretary was reported as saying "by combining two large unions with proud legacies of organising and activism, we've created a platform to drive change, for our members and their communities. We're going to campaign hard for workers' rights, health and safety, a living wage for all Kiwis, and recognising high-value skilled work". In the same piece, Helen Kelly, the outgoing president of the Council of Trade Unions, said that unions getting organised was crucial if the rights of working people were to be protected, and Annette King concluded: "Never before in the modern era has there been the need for a stronger voice for working people...We need a living wage for all New Zealanders. We need to improve the working conditions of low paid workers in this country." Business New Zealand manager of employment relations policy Paul McKay suggested the "formation of E tū could be a positive thing for the business world, as it would allow for more co-ordinated negotiations", and E Tu's co-president Muriel Tunoho said: "We believe in standing up – E tū is a call to action that challenges us to step up because if we stay where we are nothing changes." Denise Roche, in her role as spokesperson for the Green Party supported the new union, noting that when people are unionised, they have "strength in numbers" to bargain collectively for better pay and working conditions.

== Affiliations ==
E tū is affiliated to the New Zealand Council of Trade Unions (NZCTU) and one of six unions that makes up the Labour Party Affiliates. As an affiliate of the Labour Party, E tū supports policy development, and since 2012 has twenty percent vote in a preferential system to elect the leader of the party. The union also has affiliations with international unions representing workers globally.

== Toward pay equity ==
=== TerraNova case ===
In 2013 the Service and Food Workers Union, later to be part of E tū, supported Kristine Bartlett, a caregiver employed by TerraNova Homes and Care Ltd, in her campaign to gain a pay increase for care workers based on the Equal Pay Act 1972. Bartlett and the union had argued that "care and support workers in the aged residential care sector were not receiving equal pay for work of equal value, as guaranteed by the Equal Pay Act...[claiming]...this was the result of historical gender-based discrimination". The case was heard by the Employment Court on 24–26 June 2013. The Employment Court looked at various sections of the Equal Pay Act 1972, particularly section 3(1)(b) which clarified that equal pay for women "for work predominantly or exclusively performed by women" is determined by what men would be paid for doing the same work, and the Court could refer to "skills, responsibilities and services" performed by males in other similar industries as a comparator group. TerraNova Homes and Care Ltd appealed and the Employment Court decision went to the Court of Appeal which upheld the claim, finding that the Equal Pay Act required pay equity, not just equal pay.

=== Government response ===
In November 2015 the then National-led Government said a Joint Working Group (JWG), facilitated by Patsy Reddy, would provide practical information for employers and employees in implementing pay equity. John Ryall from E tū was a member of this working group. The Terms of Reference for the working group acknowledged that the Terranova Case lodged by the Service and Food Workers Union had changed how the Equal Pay Act 1972 could be viewed and that, "rather than relying on the Courts to address pay equity matters, the Government's preferred response to this change is to determine pay equity principles that can be supported by employers (both private and public sector) and unions". On 24 May 2016 the JWG provided the New Zealand Government with its recommendations. The Government accepted the recommendations on 24 November 2016 and undertook to make the appropriate changes to legislation to implement them.

A pay equity settlement of $2 billion for health care workers was announced by Jonathan Coleman on 19 April 2017. Coleman noted that the "wage boost followed the TerraNova pay equity claim brought by E tū (previously the Service and Food Workers Union) on behalf of care worker Kristine Bartlett", and specifically thanked E tū and other organisations for "their constructive and positive approach throughout the negotiations". The Care and Support Workers (Pay Equity) Settlement Agreement was confirmed to be effective from 1 July 2017, and E tū Assistant National Secretary, John Ryall acknowledged that 55,000 workers would now get pay increases, noting that work was still progressing on the same deal for "community disability support workers, funding by the Ministry of Social Development." E tū Incorporated was named as one employee representative in the Settlement Agreement. and this Agreement was ratified by the Care and Support Workers (Pay Equity) Settlement Act 2017. As the act was due to expire toward the end of June 2022, Andrew Little announced that it would be amended, and the Amendment Act was assented on 28 June 2022, to take effect on 1 July 2022.

=== Review of the Equal Pay Bill ===
The National-led Government introduced the Employment (Pay Equity and Equal Pay) Bill into parliament late in 2017 but it only passed its third reading by one vote and was generally opposed by most political parties. E tū's Equal Pay Coordinator, Yvette Taylor said that the bill would have made the process of women seeking equal pay difficult because of the criteria for proving merit. Following a general election in 2017, the coalition government led by Jacinda Ardern did not proceed with the Employment (Pay Equity and Equal Pay) Bill and announced early in 2018 that they would reconvene the Joint Working Group (JWG) to advise on issues related to pay equity. Iain Lees-Galloway said the legislation of the previous government had been withdrawn because it would have "created unnecessary hurdles for workers raising claims", and concluded that the key issues for the reconvened Joint Working Group to consider involved "determining the merit of a claim as a pay equity claim...[and]...how to select appropriate male comparators when assessing the work subject to a pay equity claim". The JWG reported back to the government on 27 February 2018 with recommendations.

The Government introduced the Equal Pay Amendments Act 2018 on 19 September 2018, recognised as in New Zealand as Suffrage Day. E tū welcomed the introduction of the bill because it preserved the Equal Pay Act (1972) while adopting some of the recommendations of the Joint Working Party. E tū's Campaign lead organiser, Yvette Taylor noted that Kate Sheppard had seen equal pay as the next goal for women after getting the vote, and concluded that the bill under consideration, resolved two problems with the previous legislation because it proposed [setting] "a lower bar for cases to progress, particularly with the parties involved able to set their own comparators".

In recommending that the Bill be passed with the amendments, The Supplementary Order Papers, released 21 July 2020, stated in the introduction: "The purpose of this bill is to improve the process for employees to raise, progress, and resolve pay equity claims. Pay equity is the principle that work predominantly performed by women should receive the same remuneration as work that may be different, but is of equal value to work done by men. This is different from equal pay claims, the principle of which is that women and men doing the same job should be paid the same."

The Equal Pay Amendment Act 2020 was passed on 24 July 2020 with Julie Ann Genter holding that "no one should be paid less just because they work in a female-dominated occupation – this is one of the biggest gains for gender equity in the workplace since the Equal Pay Act 1972".

The Pay Equity Amendment Bill 2025 introduced by the Minister for Workplace Relations and Safety, Brooke Van Velden, passed under urgency on Wednesday 7 May 2025 with no select committee process. The amendment means the cancellation of 33 pay equity claims that were in process which affects many including teachers, social workers, nurses and healthcare workers. There was immediate opposition to the bill.

== Fair pay agreements ==
=== Working party 2018 ===
A working group that had been asked to make independent recommendations to the New Zealand Government on the "scope and design of a system of bargaining to set minimum terms and conditions of employment across industries or occupations", released its report on 20 December 2018. The Otago Daily Times reported a range of views on the recommendations of the report, including concerns about the compulsory nature of FPAs and whether they would reduce the autonomy of small businesses in the regions. On behalf of the Government, Iain Lees-Galloway said the issue of compulsion needed to be considered within the context of "businesses competing on is innovation, the quality of their product, the quality of their service and being more productive". E tū along with other unions supported the recommendations, particularly the "strong arguments to change the system to be fairer for workers...[and the explanation of]...how similar industry-wide bargaining systems have been crucial for lifting living standards around the world".

=== Government position ===
In a Cabinet paper on 7 May 2021, the New Zealand Government set out its position on the key features of the Fair Pay Agreement (FPA) system and notified it was seeking approval to begin drafting legislation to give effect to the FPA system. E tū acknowledged the Cabinet paper and said it would "continue to campaign to ensure that Fair Pay Agreement law delivers on the promise of transforming the lives of workers across Aotearoa". In a 2021 opinion piece, Annie Newman, the assistant national secretary of E tū, made a strong case for fair pay agreements in New Zealand, citing research that showed "there is no economic reason not to implement sector bargaining but many social and individual wellbeing reasons to do so". Newman clarified that FPAs were not a return to compulsory unionism and, in refuting the claim that only a small number of unions would benefit from the system, noted that the opportunity to be represented in negotiations was available to all workers and employers.

=== Response to the bill ===
The New Zealand Government introduced the Fair Pay Agreements Bill on 26 October 2022. The Explanatory note for the bill states that the objective is to create a framework for bargaining for fair pay agreements and "addresses...systemic weaknesses" within the New Zealand labour market where "Māori, Pacific peoples, young people, and people with disabilities are over-represented in jobs where low pay, job security, health and safety, and upskilling are significant issues". The New Zealand Herald noted that during a "fiery debate" the legislation was opposed by the National and Act Parties. Paul Goldsmith claimed [that] "Fair Pay Agreements will make New Zealand's workplaces less agile and flexible and make all workers beholden to a union agenda", while Grant Robertson said the law meant "good employers, who would no longer be forced to drive their wages and worker conditions down to stay competitive...[and]...this is a day for employers to celebrate just as much as employees". In the same piece it was suggested that the law would make it "easier for workers to collectively negotiate with employers...[and]...unions could begin a negotiation if they got support from 1000 workers who would be covered by the agreement, 10 per cent of a workforce, or meet a public interest test". Another media article noted that the Bill had "found embrace among unions who see potential to improve working and living conditions for workers, meanwhile it's received a mostly icy reception from employer associations who believe it will create additional complexity, cost, disruption and reduced flexibility". Claims made by Business NZ that FPAs were about compulsion and "New Zealand employees and their employers lose control over the way they work and their right to negotiate their own employment conditions", were refuted by E tū, concluding that "employers and employees would be able to negotiate the agreements and both had a degree of control over how that negotiation played out, and whether it was successful".

On 26 October 2022, as the Fair Pay Agreements Bill was about to become law, E tū said it was ready to begin initiating the process for security workers and cleaners. The press release noted that the union had been advocating for fair pay legislation since 2017 with one team leader claiming: "Winning a Fair Pay Agreement will mean better pay and standard conditions for everyone in our industries. At a time with huge cost of living pressures, this will be huge for some of the most vulnerable workers in Aotearoa, especially the essential workers who kept us going during the pandemic." Sara Thompson an E tū team leader and Rose Kavapalu a cleaner based in Wellington, spoke with Dale Husband on Waatea News and both agreed that the bill would show workers, many of whom were vulnerable, they were valued and acknowledged with fair pay scales and relevant training and development. The Fair Pay Agreements Act 2022 was assented and passed on 1 November 2022.

== Significant campaigns ==
=== Metal and manufacturing industry ===
Following talks between E tū and nine companies to renew the Metal and Manufacturing Industries Collective Agreement, it was announced on 14 July 2016 that an agreement had been reached in a cross-employer deal covering 600 workers at more than 80 firms and would be presented to the delegates and members for possible ratification. The agreement covered manufacturing and engineering firms of all sizes and was first established in 1991 when industrial law was overhauled by the Employment Contracts Act. On 30 August 2016, E Tū confirmed that its members had accepted the Collective Agreement. An E tū advocate said the agreement had successfully taken "two increases in the minimum wage" into account, while [maintaining] "the relativities with wages across the industry".

=== Security industry ===
==== Addressing the zero hours issue ====
As a union affiliated to the New Zealand Council of Trade Unions, E tū supported the submission by CTU on the Employment Standards Legislation Bill (2015). Of particular concern was the impact of zero hours on employees and in a presentation to the Transport and Industrial Relations select committee, E tū spokesperson Alistair Duncan said that one security firm could "take workers down to a just a single three hour shift a week, or leave them with no shift at all", and an employee of the firm told the committee "at any time they can send you home and tell you are not needed". A spokesperson for the security firm said that they did not use zero-hour contracts but acknowledged that some of the employment was "casual and fixed/short term" and the unpredictable nature of the work meant rostering was challenging although the company made every effort possible to give adequate notice of shift cancellations.

==== Living wage ====
In March 2017, following initiation of bargaining by E tū on behalf of The Prison Escort & Court Custodial Services with First Security for a collective employment agreement for prison escort guards, it was announced that after renegotiations with Corrections in Auckland, prison escort guards would be paid the living wage of $20.20 an hour, more than a 15 percent pay rise. It was noted in the media that this was the result of "some clever bargaining by their union".

==== Position on training ====
Between February and May 2017, two reports were published that challenged the New Zealand security industry about the standard of training provided for employees. The first report, claimed the industry was "found wanting for its de facto setting of 'the cheapest bid wins' and its treatment of staff, [and] is facing a reality check through new health and safety requirements, changes to immigration and human resources rules and an emerging government-led risk averse security culture". In the same piece, E tu's industry coordinator for public and commercial services, Jill Owens, claimed that there had been unsuccessful attempts to create multi-employer labour agreements, with security companies [continuing to] "undercut each other on labour as the major cost in their contracting model". The second report focused on what the security industry needed to consider to present the sector with a more professional profile that valued regulated training and suggested there were many opportunities for employees to be upskilled. E Tu's position was that the union was working to get more funding for training, because they "put a high value on training in terms of the guard's professionalism, personal safety and recognition of skills needed to do this job".

==== Safety concerns ====
From 2018, concerns for the safety of security workers in New Zealand were raised in the media. Following the death of a Goran Milosavljevic on the job, E tū said they had difficulties initiating bargaining with Milosavljevic's employer around health and safety and training to protect guards and another former security worker said she had often felt unsafe in her job. In 2019 after a corrections officer was assaulted at Christchurch Men's Prison, a spokesperson for E tu said these assaults were becoming more frequent, with "at least six cases where security guards have suffered serious assaults in our hospitals". E tū had concerns many workers feared losing their jobs if they spoke out, and WorkSafe New Zealand was urged to become more involved and "reassess their recent categorisation of security as not being high-risk".

==== Fair pay agreement ====
On 1 July 2021, after the New Zealand Minister for Workplace Relations and Safety had considered an application by E tū asking for Schedule 1A of the Employment Relations Act to be amended and include security officers, it was announced that changes had been made to the legislation giving "security guards the same employment protections already held by cleaning, catering and some laundry and caretaking workers under the Act when an employer's business is restructured". In making the case for this change, E tū had provided interviews with 100 security officers who expressed a range of challenges about their jobs including pay rates, shift uncertainties, inadequate training, safety concerns and a lack of respect for them from the community. Prior to the announcement, the then Minister, Michael Wood had written a summary of the issues and concluded that security officers [were] "subject to employment instability in restructuring situations where their employer loses a contract, including potential undermining of their pay and terms and conditions in those restructuring situations" and one of the policy objectives in relation to the identified problem was to "protect vulnerable workers from the effects of restructuring". Wood also noted that the intention was to change the behaviour of the employers to ensure that purchasing services at low prices did not negatively impact the quality of these services and acknowledged that the New Zealand Government was a "significant purchaser of security services".

E tū stated in the media on 28 March 2023 that it had collected the required 1000 signatures to begin negotiations with the New Zealand Government on Fair Pay Agreements for security guards. E tū delegate and security guard Rosey Ngakopu noted that the Agreement would mean industry issues could be addressed "in a collective conversation" and improve working conditions, pay scales and skills and training to ensure employees had all they needed on site "to work safely and with dignity". On 29 May 2023, the Chief Executive of the Ministry of Business, Innovation and Employment (MBIE), gave public notice of approval for an application from E tu as "to initiate bargaining for a proposed fair pay agreement (FPA) under section 33 of the Fair Pay Agreements Act 2022 (the Act), for security officers and guards". Representing the employers, Gary Morrison, CEO of the New Zealand Security Association (NZSA), said his organisation shared common goals with the union in "advancing the interest of employees in the industry", noting in particular, "opportunities to set standards for training, upskilling, and the health and safety of our workers".

=== Fair pay agreement for cleaners ===
Under the Fair Pay Agreements Act (2022), cleaners in New Zealand began the process of bargaining for an Agreement when they sent a document with more than 1,000 signatures to the government in April 2023. Assistant national secretary Annie Newman, told Morning Report on RNZ National that the cleaning sector needed stability because under the current system there was high turnover due to "low pay and changeable shifts" and a need for safety training as many cleaners dealt with chemicals and electrical equipment. On 19 June 2023, The Ministry of Business, Innovation and Employment publicly notified their approval of E tū's application to "initiate bargaining for a proposed fair pay agreement (FPA) under section 33 of the Fair Pay Agreements Act 2022 (the Act), for commercial cleaners". On 21 June 2023 it was confirmed that the Chief Executive of MBIE had approved the initiation of a Fair Pay Agreement for cleaners. E tū member and cleaner, Mele Peaua, who was on the negotiating team, said "a Fair Pay Agreement will be ground-breaking for low wage cleaners like us. It will give collective bargaining power to many cleaners who currently have no access to it". Confirmation of the agreement was noted in Te Ao Māori News as significant because it resolved the problem that historically cleaning companies had been able to drive down pay as they competed for contracts, the issue that the Fair Pay Agreements Act 2022 was passed to address.
