= Pat Kelly (trade unionist) =

New Zealand trade unionist (1929–2004)

Patrick Joseph Kelly (20 November 1929 – 24 June 2004) was a New Zealand trade unionist.

Kelly emigrated from Liverpool to New Zealand in 1954 and started working at the Methven tap factory in Dunedin. He was an official of the Drivers' Union, a secretary of the Cleaners' and Caretakers' Union and president of the Wellington Trades Council during his career. He was also active in the anti-Vietnam War, anti-apartheid, anti-nuclear, and peace movements.

He died in Wellington in 2004, aged 74. He was cremated and his ashes inurned at Karori Cemetery. His daughter Helen was also an activist and trade unionist.
