= New Zealand Building Trades Union =

NZBTU
- New Zealand Building Trades Union
- Founded: 1860
- Headquarters: Christchurch, New Zealand
- Location: New Zealand
- Members: 1400
- Key people: David O'Connell, national secretary
- Affiliations: NZCTU
- Website: www.nzbtu.org.nz

The New Zealand Building Trades Union (NZBTU) was a national trade union in New Zealand. It traced its roots back to a carpenters and joiners union in 1860.

The NZBTU had 1400 members and was a member of the New Zealand Council of Trade Unions.
