= Customs Officers' Association of New Zealand =

New Zealand trade union

COA
- Customs Officers' Association of New Zealand
- Headquarters: Auckland
- Location: New Zealand

The Customs Officers' Association of New Zealand (COA) is a trade union representing customs officers of the New Zealand Customs Service.

The COA was affiliated to the New Zealand Council of Trade Unions (NZCTU) until mid-2016.
