= Farsa (disambiguation) =

Farsa is a genre of opera associated with Venice.

Farsa or FARSA may also refer to:

- Farsa, Greece, a village on the island of Kefalonia, Greece
- Fénius Farsaid, a legendary king of Scythia also known as Phenius Farsa
- Flight Attendants and Related Services Association (FARSA), a national trade union in New Zealand
- Phenylalanine–tRNA ligase alpha subunit an enzyme encoded by the gene FARSA

== See also ==
- La farsa amorosa, an opera by Italian composer Riccardo Zandona
