= New Zealand Dairy Workers Union =

NZDWU
- New Zealand Dairy Workers Union
- Headquarters: Hamilton, New Zealand
- Location: New Zealand
- Members: 8,000
- Key people: Mark Holmes, National President; Chris Jones, National Vice President; Chris Flatt, National Secretary
- Affiliations: NZCTU, IUF, Labour Party
- Website: www.nzdwu.org.nz

The New Zealand Dairy Workers Union (NZDWU) is a national trade union in New Zealand. It represents over 8,000 workers active in dairy factories, town milk supply, processing plants, stores and warehousing, packing, can-making, and other ancillary activities including drivers.

The NZDWU is affiliated with the New Zealand Council of Trade Unions, the IUF and the New Zealand Labour Party.
