= New Zealand Tramways Union =

The New Zealand Tramways and Public Passenger Transport Employees Union was founded in 1903. It was founded to represent tramway employees. The union also represented council bus drivers in the areas where these services ran in conjunction with tram services. Since the 1950s and 60s, trams were replaced by trolley and diesel buses and their drivers are who the New Zealand Tramways Union represent today.

The Tramways Union has branches in Auckland, Wellington and Dunedin. The Tramways Union is affiliated to the Council of Trade Unions (CTU) and the Wellington branch has an affiliation with the Manufacturing and Construction Workers Union.

In 2008, Tramways Union members at GO Wellington were locked out, as were Auckland drivers employed by NZ Bus in 2009. In both cases the union came away with improved wages and conditions at the end of the industrial dispute.
