= Furniture, Manufacturing & Associated Workers Union =

Trade union in New Zealand

- Furniture, Manufacturing & Associated Workers Union
- Headquarters: Christchurch, New Zealand
- Location: New Zealand
- Members: 620
- Key people: Len Wilson-Parr, secretary
- Affiliations: NZCTU

The Furniture, Manufacturing & Associated Workers Union is a trade union in New Zealand. It has a membership of 620, and is affiliated with the New Zealand Council of Trade Unions.
