= Carolyn Burns =

New Zealand zoologist and academic

Dame Carolyn Burns DNZM CBE
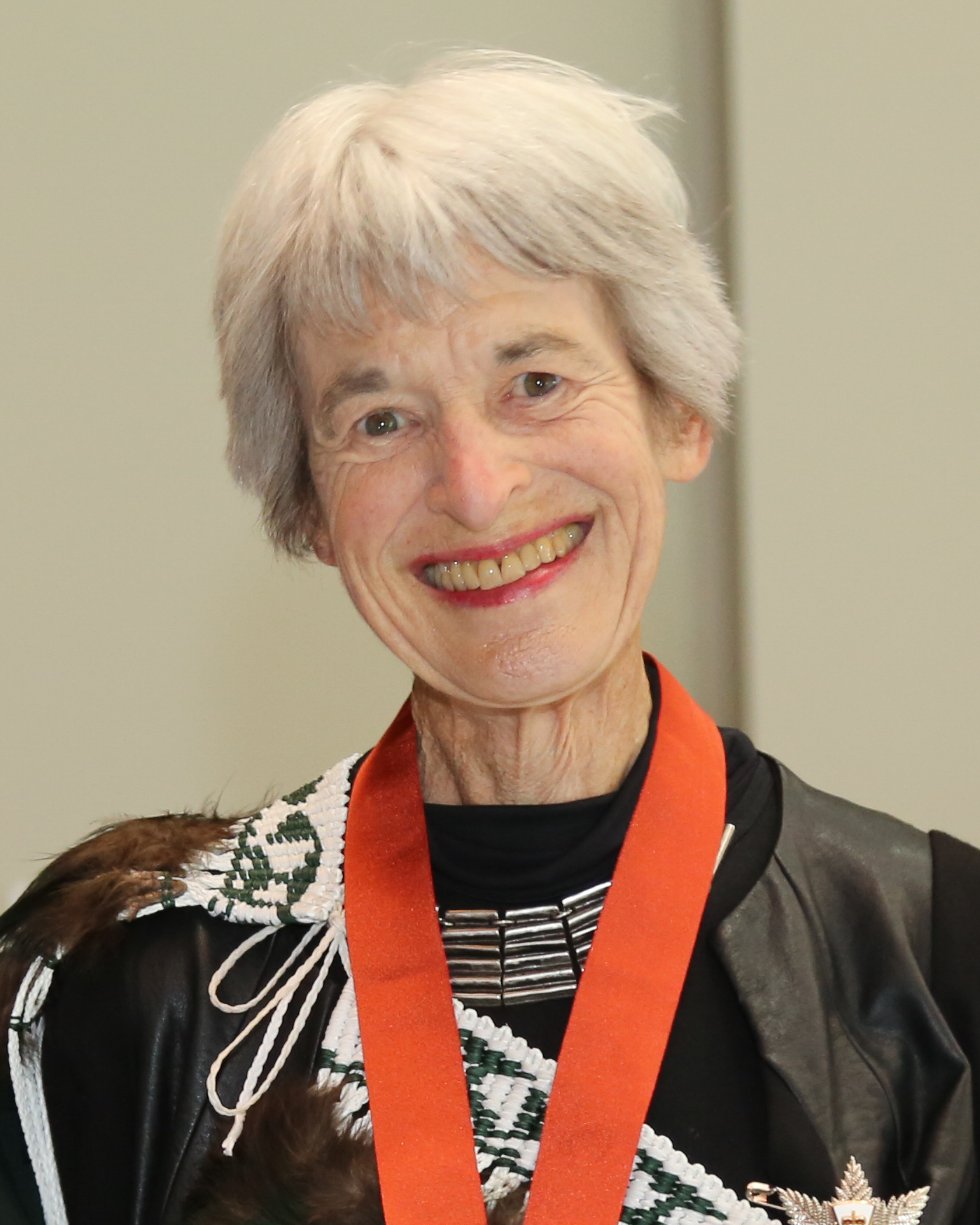
- Born: 3 February 1942 (age 84); Lincoln, New Zealand
- Spouse: John Ingram Hubbard (m. 1981; died 1995)
- Parents: Malcolm Burns (father); Ruth Alvina Burns (née Waugh) (mother)
- Scientific career
- Education: University of Canterbury – BSc(Hons); University of Toronto – PhD
- Awards: Commander of the Order of the British Empire, New Zealand 1990 Commemoration Medal, Naumann-Thienemann Medal of the International Society of Limnology, Marsden Medal of the New Zealand Association of Scientists, Dame Companion of the New Zealand Order of Merit
- Fields: Zoology, limnology
- Institutions: University of Otago
- Thesis: The feeding behaviour of Daphnia under natural conditions. (1966)

Dame Carolyn Waugh Burns DNZM CBE (born 3 February 1942) is a New Zealand ecologist specialising in lakes. She is an emeritus professor at the University of Otago.

== Early life, family, and education ==
Burns was born in Lincoln, New Zealand, the daughter of Ruth Alvina Burns (née Waugh) and Malcolm McRae Burns, an agricultural scientist. She was educated at Christchurch Girls' High School, before studying zoology at the University of Canterbury, from where she graduated Bachelor of Science with first-class honours in 1962. She completed a PhD at the University of Toronto in 1966, with her thesis titled The feeding behaviour of Daphnia under natural conditions.

In 1981, Burns married John Ingram Hubbard, professor of physiology at the University of Otago. He died in 1995.

== Academic career ==
After a period working as a research associate in biology at Yale University from 1967 to 1968, Burns returned to New Zealand to take up a lectureship in zoology at the University of Otago. She rose to the rank of professor, being awarded a personal chair in zoology in 1993, and she served as head of the Department of Zoology between 1997 and 1999. On her retirement in 2010, Burns was conferred the title of professor emeritus by the University of Otago.

Burns was a member of the Nature Conservation Council from 1975 to 1990, including five years as chairman between 1978 and 1983. She was also a member of the National Parks and Reserves Authority from 1981 to 1990 Burns was active in the International Union for Conservation of Nature (IUCN), serving on its Commission on Education from 1979 to 1988, the Commission on Ecology from 1988 to 1990, and the Commission on National Parks and Protected Areas from 1988. She was a regional councillor of the IUCN from 1984 to 1990, and chaired the New Zealand committee of IUCN members from 1986 to 1990.

She served as convenor of the "Ecology, Evolution and Behaviour" panel for the Marsden Fund.

== Awards and honours ==
In the 1984 Queen's Birthday Honours, Burns was appointed a Commander of the Order of the British Empire, for services to conservation. In 1990, she was awarded the New Zealand 1990 Commemoration Medal.

Burns was elected a Fellow of the Royal Society of New Zealand in 1993. In 2007, she was awarded a Naumann-Thienemann Medal by the International Society of Limnology (SIL) for "outstanding studies on physiology and population dynamics of southern hemisphere zooplankton and food-web interactions, as well as her indefatigable and successful endeavor to New Zealand lakes, and for her service to SIL". In 2017, Burns received the Marsden Medal from the New Zealand Association of Scientists. The same year, Burns was selected as one of the Royal Society Te Apārangi's "150 women in 150 words", celebrating the contributions of women to knowledge in New Zealand.

In the 2021 Queen's Birthday Honours, Burns was appointed a Dame Companion of the New Zealand Order of Merit, for services to ecological research.

== Selected works ==
- Burns, Carolyn W. (1968). "The Relationship Between Body Size of Filter-Feeding Cladocera and the Maximum Size of Particle Ingested". Limnology and Oceanography. 13 (4): 675–678. doi:10.4319/lo.1968.13.4.0675.
- Hall, D. J.; Threlkeld, S. T.; Burns, C. W.; Crowley, P. H. (1976). "The Size-Efficiency Hypothesis and the Size Structure of Zooplankton Communities". Annual Review of Ecology and Systematics. 7: 177–208. doi:10.1146/annurev.es.07.110176.001141.
- Burns, Carolyn W. (1969). "Relation Between Filtering Rate, Temperature, and Body Size in Four Species Ofdaphnia". Limnology and Oceanography. 14 (5): 693–700. doi:10.4319/lo.1969.14.5.0693.
- Folt, Carol L.; Burns, Carolyn W. (1999). "Biological drivers of zooplankton patchiness". Trends in Ecology & Evolution. 14 (8): 300–305. doi:10.1016/S0169-5347(99)01616-X. PMID 10407426.
