= Flight Attendants and Related Services Association =

Former trade union in New Zealand

FARSA
- Flight Attendants & Related Services Association (NZ) Incorporated
- Headquarters: Auckland City, Auckland, New Zealand
- Location: New Zealand
- Key people: Marja Lubeck, President; Pete Bentley, General Secretary
- Affiliations: NZCTU, International Transport Workers' Federation

The Flight Attendants & Related Services Association (FARSA) was a national trade union in New Zealand. It represented New Zealand-based flight attendants at Air New Zealand International including Flight Service Managers. Also represented are flight attendants and cabin managers from Air New Zealand Domestic Jet, Air Nelson, Jetconnect (Qantas) Long Haul & Short Haul, Virgin Australia and Jetstar. It was based in Auckland.

In November 2016, FARSA merged with E Tū, a private sector union.
