= NZ Merchant Service Guild Industrial Union of Workers =

NZMSG
- NZ Merchant Service Guild Industrial Union of Workers
- Headquarters: Wellington, New Zealand
- Location: New Zealand
- Key people: Helen McAra, general secretary
- Affiliations: NZCTU
- Website: www.nzmsg.co.nz

The NZ Merchant Service Guild Industrial Union of Workers (NZMSG) is a trade union in New Zealand. It represents workers in seagoing ships, as well as the waterfront/ports/shore-based shipping industry, and the passenger/tourism industry.

The NZMSG has 1000 members and is affiliated with the New Zealand Council of Trade Unions and the International Transport Workers' Federation.
