= Finance and Information Workers Union =

Trade union in Wellington, New Zealand

Finsec
- Finance Sector Union
- Merged into: First Union New Zealand
- Founded: 1990
- Dissolved: 2011
- Headquarters: Wellington, New Zealand
- Location: New Zealand
- Members: 6600
- Key people: Kelvin Pycroft, President; Andrew Casidy, General Secretary
- Affiliations: NZCTU
- Website: www.finsec.org.nz

Finance and Information Workers Union (Finsec) was a small organising trade union covering about 6,600 workers in the New Zealand finance sector. It was formed in 1990 from the merger of the Bank Officers’ Union and the

Insurance Workers Union. In October 2011, Finsec amalgamated with the National Distribution Union to create a new union called First Union New Zealand.

The majority of its members were located at the four big foreign owned banks in New Zealand; ASB, ANZ National Bank, BNZ and Westpac. However, it also covered legal employees, accountancy employees, stock and station employees and commerce workers, and a growing number of members work in call centres, information technology, communications and related industries. Finsec had offices in Auckland, Hamilton, Wellington and Christchurch. It was an affiliate of the New Zealand Council of Trade Unions (NZCTU) and Union Network International (UNI).
