= New Zealand Meat & Related Trades Workers Union =

Trade union in New Zealand

NZ Meat Workers
- New Zealand Meat & Related Trades Workers Union
- Headquarters: Christchurch, New Zealand
- Location: New Zealand
- Members: 22,000 (peak season)
- Key people: Dave Eastlake, general secretary
- Affiliations: NZCTU, Labour Party
- Website: www.nzmeatworkersunion.co.nz

The New Zealand Meat & Related Trades Workers Union is a trade union in New Zealand. It represents workers in the New Zealand meat industry. This includes workers in freezing works, tanneries, fertiliser plants, halal slaughtermen, small meat processing plants and small goods.

The NZ Meat Workers has a membership of 22,000 during peak season, and is affiliated with the New Zealand Council of Trade Unions and the New Zealand Labour Party. It is also directly organised with the Meat Union Aotearoa.
