= Helen Kelly (trade unionist) =

New Zealand trade unionist

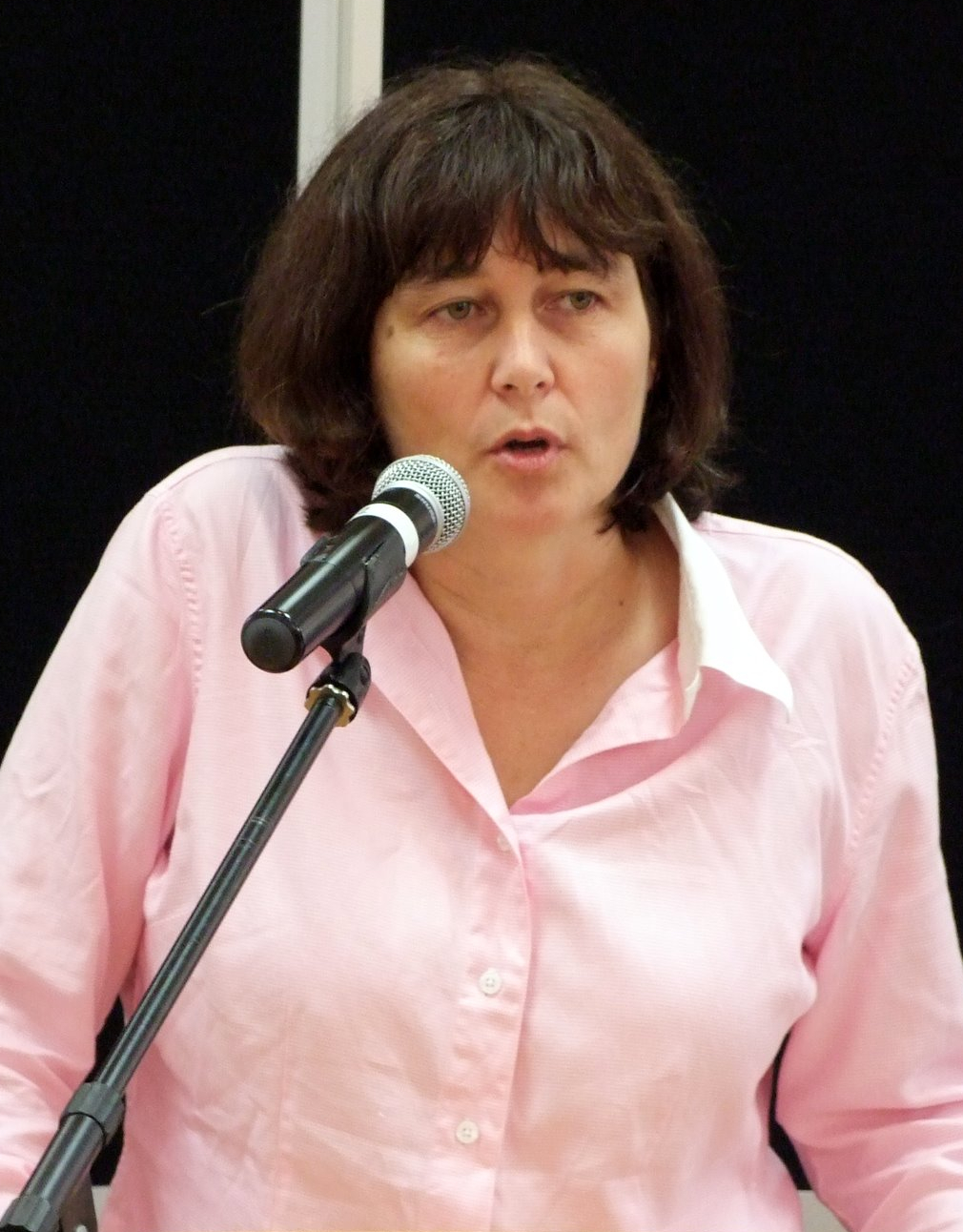
- Kelly in 2011
- Born: 19 September 1964; Wellington, New Zealand
- Died: 14 October 2016 (aged 52); Wellington, New Zealand
- Education: Victoria University of Wellington
- Occupation: Trade unionist
- Years active: 2007–2016
- Employer: Council of Trade Unions
- Partner: Steve Hurring
- Children: 1
- Father: Pat Kelly

Helen Kelly (19 September 1964 – 14 October 2016) was President of the New Zealand Council of Trade Unions from 2007 to 2015.

== Early life ==
Kelly was born in Wellington on 19 September 1964 to Pat Kelly and Catherine Eichelbaum, both strong social activists – Pat was a well-known unionist and Cath was active in the anti-Vietnam war movement – who met while selling a communist newspaper, People's Voice. Catherine was a cousin of Chief Justice Thomas Eichelbaum.

She said of her childhood:

"I was brought up on unions. Mum would wake us by singing, "Wake up darlings from your slumbers". I used to play at going to meetings, rather than dress-up dolls. Our home was union central. We always had visitors who were discussing union business."

Kelly attended Wellington High School. In 1983 she enrolled in a Diploma in Teaching at Wellington Teachers' College and was elected President of the Association of Wellington Teachers College Trainees (AWTCT) the following year. She later studied law and education at Victoria University of Wellington.

== Career ==
Kelly started her career as a primary school teacher, enjoying working for three years at Johnsonville Main School. She was appointed a union delegate on her first day teaching and quickly became more involved in union affairs. She held senior positions with both the New Zealand Institute of Education and the Association of University Staff (now the New Zealand Tertiary Education Union). She was the youngest person appointed as a general secretary of the AUS, a position she held for five years until her election as CTU President in 2007.

Kelly was an outspoken advocate for better safety standards in the New Zealand forestry industry. As a result of her campaigning, a review into the industry was launched and some operators were forcibly closed. In one case, the government refused to press charges against the employer, so Kelly led a private prosecution against the company. The number of deaths due to forestry-related accidents subsequently fell, from 10 deaths in 2013 to 1 in 2014 and 3 in 2015.

After the 2010 Pike River Mine disaster that killed 29 miners, Helen Kelly worked for improved safety standards and justice through the courts for the miners' families. She was also recognised for her compassion and support of the victims' families. Other campaigns she led focused on farming, exposing farmers offering jobs at lower than the minimum wage, and she was a supporter of the Unite Union's campaign against zero hour contracts.

In an August 2016 interview Kelly stated that she would be standing in the 2017 New Zealand general election if she wasn't sick, and that she had considered standing in the 2014 New Zealand general election.

=== The Hobbit film dispute ===
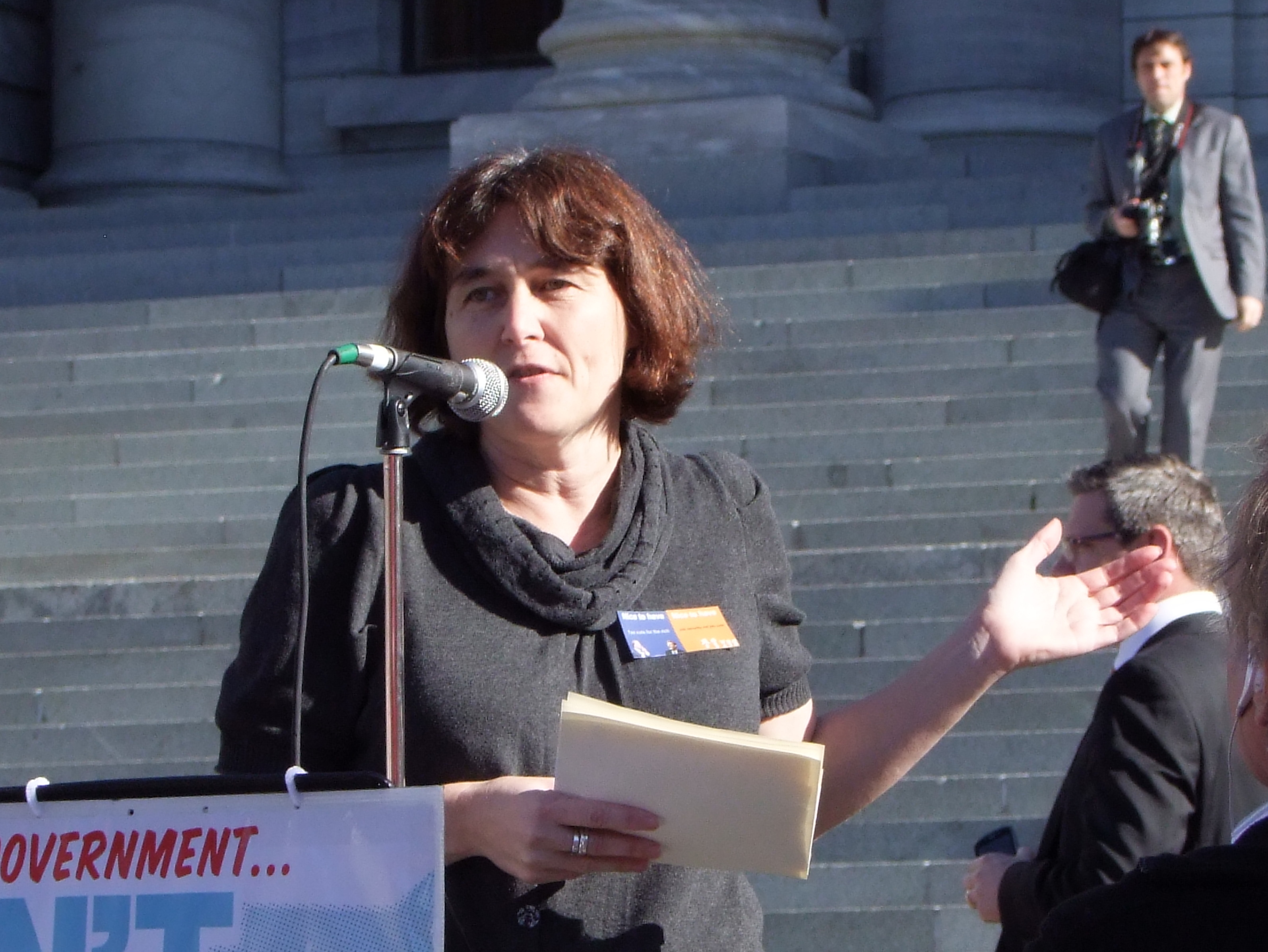
Kelly speaking at a Budget day rally at Parliament in 2011

In 2010, during the negotiations for the production of Warner Bros' The Hobbit films in New Zealand, Kelly got involved in a controversy regarding contract workers' rights in the film industry. Kelly said in a statement at the time: "let's get all the facts on the table about taxes, subsidies, and other issues – rather than just blaming the union for asking to meet on basic terms and conditions". In April 2011, Kelly published an extensive timeline of events around the negotiations.

== Personal life and death ==
Kelly lived in Mount Victoria, Wellington, with her husband Steve Hurring, and her son Dylan, from a previous relationship.

Kelly was diagnosed with lung cancer in February 2015, aged 50, despite never being a smoker. During her illness, she campaigned for the right to die with dignity, and the right to use medicinal cannabis.

She died on 14 October 2016.
