= Aus (surname) =

Aus is a surname. Notable people with the surname include:

- Gunvald Aus (1851–1950), Norwegian-American engineer
- Lauri Aus (1970–2003), Estonian cyclist
- Reet Aus (born 1976), Estonian artist, art researcher and pedagogue
