= Roger Award =

The Roger Award.

The Roger Award For The Worst Transnational Corporation Operating in New Zealand was an annual media campaign run since 1997 by two activist organisations, Campaign Against Foreign Control of Aotearoa and GATT Watchdog. The winners were chosen by a group of academics, activists, businesspeople and trade unionists.

In April 2018 it was announced the 2016 Roger Award would be the final award, due to a declining number of nominations.

== Background ==
The awards bear the name of former New Zealand Finance Minister Sir Roger Douglas, who introduced far reaching market-oriented reforms in the 1980s (also taken into account during the naming decision were New Zealand Business Roundtable director Roger Kerr, the verb "to roger", and the term "Jolly Roger"). These changes, reinforced by successor Ruth Richardson in the 1990s, made the country's economy one of the most open in the world. Through this period, the role and profile of multinational companies increased. The privatisation of Tranz Rail and Telecom New Zealand, companies that have won multiple Roger Awards, remain particularly controversial - since being given their first awards, they have been re-nationalised and unbundled respectively.

The Roger Award has been used as the model for similar campaigns overseas.

== Criteria ==
The winner was selected by evaluation of the judges made on four criteria, "Economic dominance"; "Impact on people"; "Environmental damage and abuse of animals"; and "Political interference". This last criterion was judged on the basis of whether the nominee is "running an ideological crusade".

Having "won" on three occasions, Tranz Rail was inducted into the 'Hall of Shame' in 2003. It has ceased to exist having been absorbed by Toll NZ, a two-time nominee, and subsequently nationalised as KiwiRail by the Fifth Labour Government of New Zealand. Telecom New Zealand was nominated each year since 1997, and has since been succeeded by Chorus Limited and Spark New Zealand.

== Past winners ==
Year	Winner	Runners-up	Other finalists	Special awards
1997	Tranz Rail	Independent Newspapers Limited (INL), Coeur Gold	Telecom New Zealand, Comalco, Westpac, Juken Nissho, Lion Nathan, Brierley Investments	
1998	Monsanto			
1999	TransAlta			
2000	Tranz Rail			
2001	Carter Holt Harvey			
2002	Tranz Rail			Tranz Rail becomes the first occupant of the Hall of Shame
2003	Juken Nissho			
2004	Telecom New Zealand			
2005	Bank of New Zealand, Westpac			
2006	Progressive Enterprises	Telecom New Zealand	Toll NZ, ANZ Bank, British American Tobacco, Contact Energy, ABB	
2007	Telecom New Zealand	British American Tobacco and Spotless	GlaxoSmithKline, ANZ Bank, APN News & Media, Independent Liquor, Pike River Coal	
2008	British American Tobacco	Rio Tinto NZ	ANZ Bank, Contact Energy, GlaxoSmithKline, Infratil, McDonald's, Telecom New Zealand	Accomplice Award: Business New Zealand
2009	ANZ Bank	Rio Tinto NZ	Bank of New Zealand, Infratil, Newmont, Rymans, Telecom New Zealand, Transpacific and Westpac.	Accomplice Award: Auckland City Council and its officials
2010	Warner Brothers		Bupa, Imperial Tobacco, Vodafone, Warner Brothers and Westpac	
2011	Rio Tinto Alcan	Oceania, Sajo Oyang Corporation and Westpac	Adidas, Newmont Waihi Gold, Skycity Entertainment Group and Telecom New Zealand	Accomplice Award: the New Zealand Government (in its own right and accompanying both Sajo Oyang and Telecom).
2012	Taejin Fisheries	Rio Tinto Alcan, King Salmon	Four Australian-owned banks collectively (ANZ, ASB, Bank of New Zealand & Westpac), Insurance Australia Group, Newmont Waihi Gold, Taejin Fisheries Co. Ltd, and Vodafone.	Accomplice Award: The New Zealand Government, United Fisheries People's Choice Award: British American Tobacco
2013	Rio Tinto	Sky City Casino, Chorus	ANZ, Chorus, IAG Insurance Group, Imperial Tobacco, Rio Tinto, Sky City Casino and Talent 2.	There were several nominations for the Accomplice Award, all for the Government
2014	ANZ Bank	IAG/State Insurance	ANZ Bank, British American Tobacco NZ, Coca-Cola Amatil, IAG/State Insurance, PGG Wrightson, and Rio Tinto.	Accomplice Award: Food & Grocery Council
2015	IAG/State Insurance	Serco	Bunnings, Westpac, MediaWorks New Zealand, Apple	
2016	Youi	IAG/State Insurance	Uber	
