= Kristine Bartlett =

New Zealand aged care worker

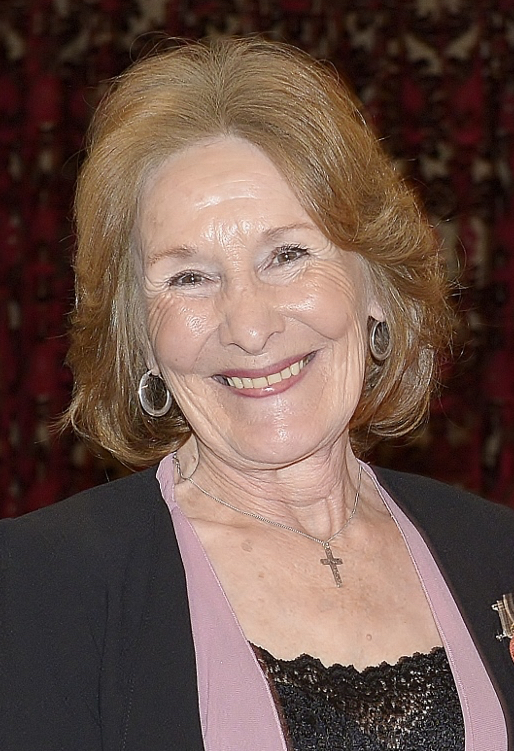
Bartlett in 2018

Kristine Robyn Bartlett CNZM is an aged care worker from Lower Hutt, New Zealand. She is known for leading a campaign for equal pay for care workers. Her case was heard in the Employment Court, the Court of Appeal and the Supreme Court. Bartlett was awarded the Supreme Award in the 2017 NEXT Woman of the Year awards, and in 2018 was appointed a Companion of the New Zealand Order of Merit, for services to equal pay advocacy, and was New Zealander of the Year.

== Life ==
In 2012, Bartlett filed a claim with the Employment Relations Authority that she was not receiving equal pay as per the Equal Pay Act of 1972. She argued she had worked for 20 years for very low pay because aged care work is largely performed by women. At the time she filed the case, Bartlett was being paid just over the minimum wage. Over the next five years, Bartlett's case, Terranova Homes & Care Limited v Service and Food Workers Union Nga Ringa Tota Incorporated, was heard by New Zealand's Employment Court, Court of Appeal and Supreme Court. In 2017, a settlement was reached which raised wages for workers in residential aged care, disability support services and home support services.

In 2017, Bartlett won the NEXT Woman of the Year Supreme Award. The panel of judges stated that Bartlett had taken responsibility for the pay equity fight and had improved the lives of many thousands of women.

In the 2018 Queen's Birthday Honours, Bartlett was appointed a Companion of the New Zealand Order of Merit, for services to equal pay advocacy. The same year was awarded New Zealander of the Year. The citation acknowledged her bravery in filing her case for equal pay, and that by pursuing it, she had improved the lives of thousands of women.

In 2024, Bartlett expressed disappointment that pay equity claims resulting from her case were still not settled.
