= Association of Staff in Tertiary Education =

- Te Hau Takitini o Aotearoa
- Abbreviation: ASTE
- Founded: 1988
- Headquarters: Wellington, New Zealand
- Location: New Zealand
- Key people: Sharn Riggs, national secretary Jo Scott, paearataki
- Affiliations: NZCTU
- Website: www.aste.ac.nz

The Association of Staff in Tertiary Education (Māori: Te Hau Takitini o Aotearoa; ASTE) was a national trade union in New Zealand. In 2009, it merged with Association of University Staff (AUS) to become the New Zealand Tertiary Education Union. ASTE was formed in 1988 by the merger of the Teacher Colleges Association (TCA), and the NZ Association of Polytechnic Teachers (NZAPT). The majority of members were from polytechnics. However, it retained coverage of the academic staff at the Auckland University of Technology (AUT) and had members at the Victoria, Massey, Waikato and Auckland universities who were employed at the former Wellington Polytechnic and former colleges of education before these institutions were merged with the universities. Most of the other staff at the seven established universities belonged to the Association of University Staff, although some belonged to the Public Service Association (PSA) and the Service and Food Workers Union.

ASTE & Association of University Staff (AUS) elected to amalgamate to become New Zealand Tertiary Education Union (NZTEU) effective 1 January 2009.

The ASTE was a member of the New Zealand Council of Trade Unions.
