= Association of University Staff of New Zealand =

AUS
- Association of University Staff of New Zealand Inc.
- Founded: 1 July 1991
- Headquarters: Wellington, New Zealand
- Location: New Zealand
- Members: 6500
- Key people: Nigel Haworth, national president Helen Kelly, general secretary
- Affiliations: NZCTU
- Website: www.aus.ac.nz

The Association of University Staff of New Zealand (AUS) was a national trade union in New Zealand. At its peak, it represented 6500 workers employed in New Zealand universities. In 2009 it merged with the Association of Staff in Tertiary Education to form the New Zealand Tertiary Education Union.

The AUS was formed 1 July 1991 in a merger between the Association of University Teachers of New Zealand (AUTNZ) and the New Zealand University Technicians Union (NZUTU).

The AUS was a member of the New Zealand Council of Trade Unions, as well as Education International.
