= Campaign Against Foreign Control of Aotearoa =

New Zealand organization

The Campaign Against Foreign Control of Aotearoa (CAFCA) is a research and lobbying organisation combatting what it considers the sell-out of New Zealand companies and assets to overseas interests. The organisation evolved from the then-named Campaign Against Foreign Control in New Zealand which began in the early 1970s.

The organisation was founded by Owen Wilkes.

== Economic criticism ==
One of the main planks of CAFCA is opposition against foreign acquisition of New Zealand assets. In this regard, they criticise the free-market policies which have made such foreign acquisition possible, and the fact that the relevant regulatory authorities (such as the Overseas Investment Office) are amongst the weakest government branches, 'rubber-stamping' investment instead of regulating it.

Direct ownership of New Zealand companies by foreign parties increased from $9.7 billion in 1989 to $83 billion in 2007 (an over 700% increase), while 41% of the New Zealand sharemarket valuation is now overseas-owned, compared to 19% in 1989. Around 7% of all New Zealand agriculturally productive land is also foreign-owned. CAFCA considers that the effect of such takeovers has generally been negative in terms of jobs and wages.

CAFCA are one of the organisers of the Roger Award for the Worst Transnational Corporation operating in New Zealand.
