= Workers First Union =

New Zealand trade union

FIRST Union
- FIRST Union
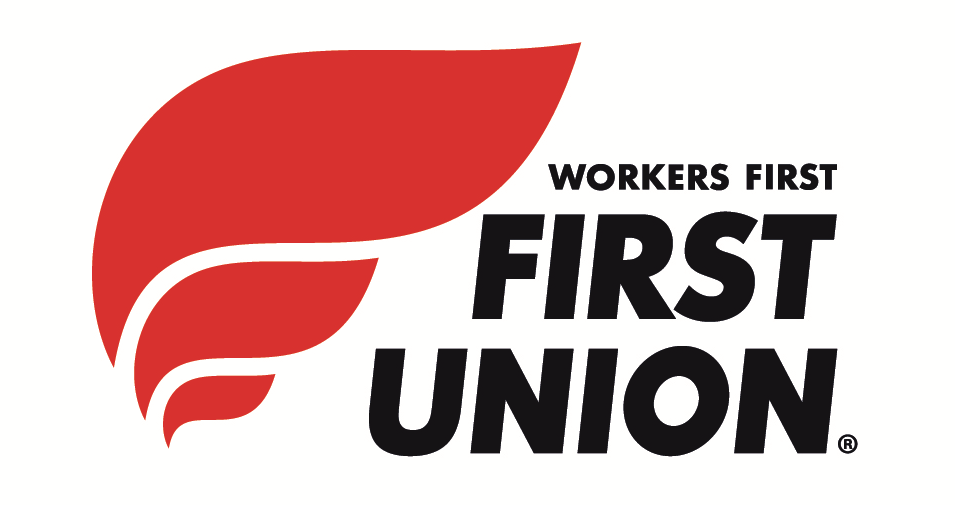
- Founded: 2011
- Headquarters: Auckland, New Zealand
- Location: New Zealand
- Members: 31,000
- Key people: Bill Bradford, president Dennis Maga, general secretary
- Affiliations: NZCTU
- Website: www.workersfirst.nz

Workers First Union is a national trade union in New Zealand that was formed as First Union on 1 October 2011 by the merger of the National Distribution Union and Finsec. It changed to the current name in March 2024.

== Leadership and structure ==
FIRST Union has a membership of more than 31,000 as of 1 October 2023 and is affiliated with the New Zealand Council of Trade Unions. It is also affiliated to various international federations through its five sectors; Finance, Industrial (Textile, Clothing, Baking, Wood, Energy), Retail, Stores (distribution and logistics) and Transport. While not affiliated with the New Zealand Labour Party, former NDU secretary Laila Harré (as an Alliance MP) served in the Fifth Labour Government as Minister for Women's Affairs and was the primary architect of the country's paid parental leave system.

The current General Secretary is Dennis Maga, the first Asian New Zealander to lead a major New Zealand trade union. Maga was born in the Philippines and elected general secretary in November 2017.

== History ==
On 7 November 2018, the New Zealand Bakers, Pastrycooks and Related Employees Union amalgamated into FIRST Union. The New Zealand Bakers, Pastrycooks and Related Employees Union reported having 443 members on March 1, 2018, in its annual membership return. On 28 April 2023, the Northern Chemical Workers Union amalgamated into FIRST Union.
