= New Zealand Council of Trade Unions =

Peak body for trade unions in New Zealand

NZCTU
- New Zealand Council of Trade Unions
- Founded: 1987
- Headquarters: Education House, Wellington, New Zealand
- Location: New Zealand
- Members: 360,000
- Key people: Sandra Grey, President; Melissa Ansell-Bridges, Secretary
- Affiliations: ITUC, TUAC
- Website: www.union.org.nz

The New Zealand Council of Trade Unions (NZCTU or CTU; Māori: Te Kauae Kaimahi) is a national trade union centre in New Zealand. The NZCTU represents 360,000 workers, and is the largest democratic organisation in New Zealand.

== History ==
The NZCTU was formed in 1987 by the merger of the New Zealand Federation of Labour (NZFL or FOL) and the Combined State Unions (CSU).

As part of the merger process, a constitutional and policy conference was held in March 1987. This voted by a very small margin (265,463 to 265,187) to have separate committees for women and Māori, with voting rights at all levels of the organisation, including on the national executive.

The Maritime and Transport Workers’ Federation led a protest of dozens of blue-collar unions against the merger with the predominantly white-collar unions in the state sector.

The Labour Relations Act 1987 ended compulsory arbitration but kept compulsory unionism, blanket award coverage and the unions’ exclusive right to represent workers. The NZCTU tried to reach agreement with the Labour government on a future role for the unions, but failed until just before the 1990 general election, which Labour lost heavily.

The Employment Contracts Act 1991, introduced by the National government, ended compulsory unionism, abolished national awards and removed unions' exclusive right to represent workers, leading to significant decline in union membership and influence during the 1990s.

Following the election of the Labour government in 1999, the Employment Relations Act 2000 restored legal recognition of unions and introduced good-faith bargaining requirements, allowing unions to rebuild their membership. However, union membership remained substantially below its earlier levels.

== Activities ==
The NZCTU's constitution describes its role as uniting democratic trade unions, and promoting the economic, social, industrial, political, education interests and civil rights of working people in New Zealand, and promoting economic policies that lead to growth, high employment and a stable economy.

The NZCTU is an affiliate of the International Trade Union Confederation (ITUC).

Political commentator Bryce Edwards has described the NZCTU as being closely associated with the Labour Party. There is no formal affiliation, but individual unions can formally affiliate to the Labour Party. In 2023 there were 11 such unions.

During the 2023 election campaign, National Party campaign chair Chris Bishop described NZCTU as "intimately" connected to the Labour Party. This was in response to the NZCTU launching an advertising campaign attacking National Party leader Christopher Luxon. Bishop accused the NZCTU and Labour Party of promoting negative campaigning. NZCTU's president Richard Wagstaff defended the union's campaign, claiming that it was targeting National's policies, including the proposed elimination of fair pay agreements, the restoration of 90-day work trials, and public sector cuts. Labour leader Chris Hipkins defended the NZCTU's advertisements, stating that the union had published advertisements in previous elections.

In May 2024, the NZCTU launched a long-term socio-economic project called "Reimagining Aotearoa Together" with the stated goal to "set out an alternative vision for Aotearoa that looks beyond the narrow confines of the policy straight jacket adopted by successive governments." In a press release, the union invited workers, Māori people, community allies, non-governmental organisations and other interested New Zealanders to participate in policy development for the project.

== Presidents ==
Sandra Grey, NZCTU President 2024–present

- 2024–current: Sandra Grey, former TEU national secretary
- 2015–2024: Richard Wagstaff, former PSA national secretary
- 2007–2015: Helen Kelly, former TEU national secretary
- 1999–2007: Ross Wilson CNZM
- 1987–1999: Ken Douglas, ONZ

New Zealand Federation of Labour

- 1979–1987: Jim Knox, ONZ
- 1963–1979: Sir Tom Skinner, KBE
- 1953–1963: Fintan Patrick Walsh

== Secretaries ==
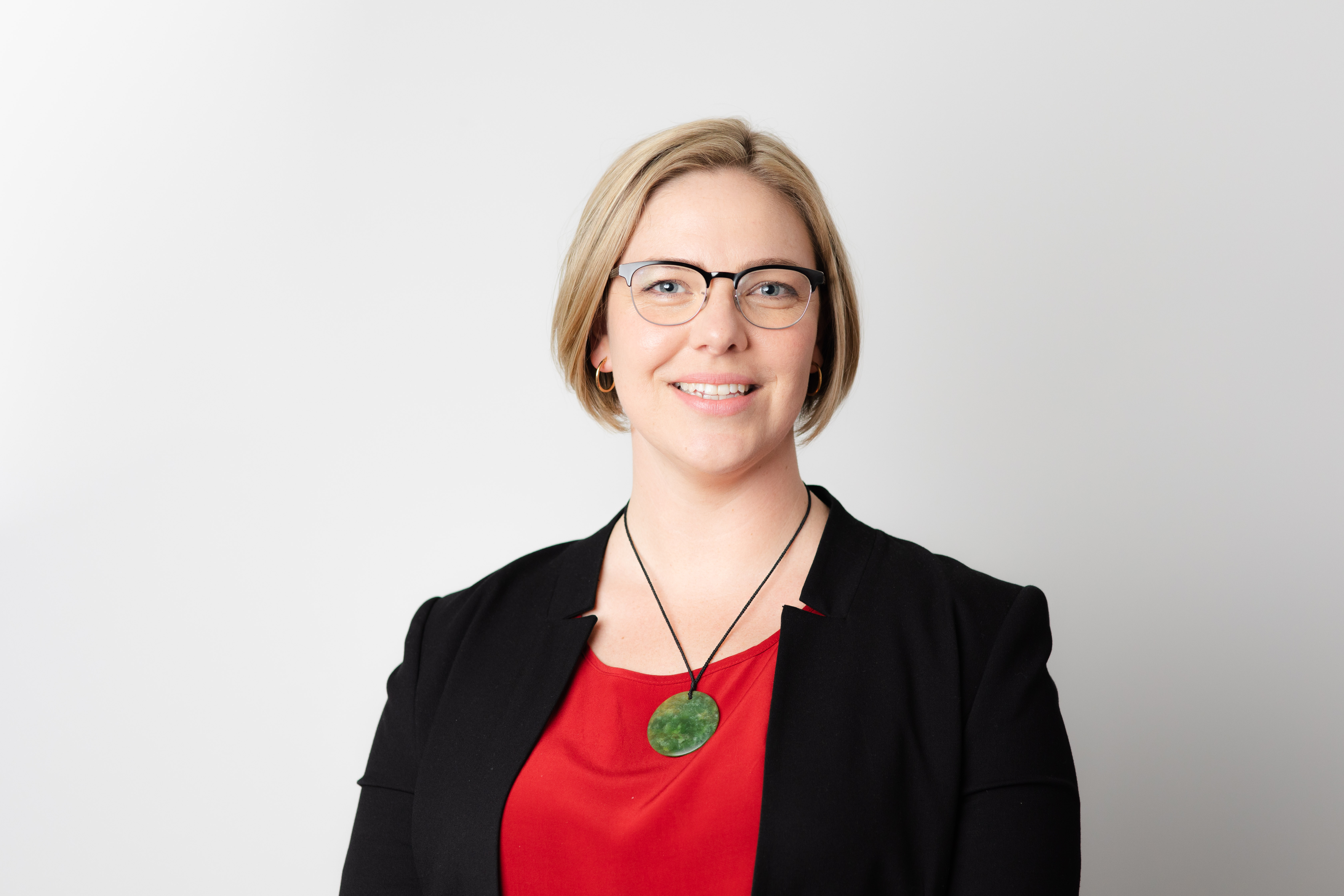
Melissa Ansell-Bridges, NZCTU Secretary 2019–present

- 2019–Present: Melissa Ansell-Bridges, former equity director
- 2015–2019: Sam Huggard, former NDU and FIRST Union campaigns officer
- 2008–2015: Peter Conway, former NZCTU economist
- 2004–2008: Carol Beaumont
- 1999–2004: Paul Goulter, former general secretary of the financial sector union Finsec
- 1987–1999: Angela Foulkes, ONZM

== Affiliated unions ==
Union Name	Membership (1 March 2025)
Aotearoa Legal Workers' Union (ALWU)	1,296
Association of Salaried Medical Specialists (ASMS)	6,081
Aviation and Marine Engineers Association (AMEA)	3,439
Dairy Workers Union (NZDWU)	8,500
Directors & Editors Guild of NZ	363
Equity New Zealand (formerly the Media Entertainment & Arts Alliance)	1,014
E tū	47,794
Furniture, Manufacturing & Associated Workers Union	648
Independent Schools Education Association (ISEA)	969
Maritime Union of NZ (MUNZ)	2,840
Midwifery Representation & Advisory Services (MERAS)	2,167
National Union of Public Employees	1,998
NZEI Te Riu Roa: NZ Educational Institute (NZEI)	48,992
NZ Meat Workers & Related Trades Union (NZMWU)	12,886
NZ Merchant Service Guild Industrial Union of Workers Inc (NZMSG)	654
NZ Nurses Organisation (NZNO)	62,754
NZ Post Primary Teachers Association Te Wehengarua (PPTA)	20,593
NZ Professional Firefighters Union (NZPFU)	2,058
NZ Professional Footballers Association	121
NZ Tramways & Public Transport Employees Union	1,250 (Wellington Branch: 450)
NZ Writers Guild (NZWG)	367
Postal Workers Union of Aotearoa (Northern & Southern)	951
Pulp & Paper Workers Union – Kawerau	390
Public Service Association (PSA)	83,894
Rail & Maritime Transport Union (RMTU)	6,121
Specialty Trainees of NZ (STONZ)	2,029
Taxpro	700
Tertiary Education Union – Te Hautu Kahurangi o Aotearoa (NZTEU)	10,300
Tertiary Institutes Allied Staff Association (TIASA)	1,781
Tuia Union	297
Unite	5,604
Workers First Union	33,412

== Formerly affiliated unions ==
Name	Details
Alloy Yachts Employees Federation	Dissolved in 2016, following Alloy Yachts ceasing operations in April 2016.
Amalgamated Workers Union (Central)	Disaffiliated.
Amalgamated Workers Union (Northern)	Disaffiliated.
Association of Staff in Tertiary Education	Amalgamated in 2009 with the Association of University Staff of New Zealand.
Association of University Staff	Amalgamated in 2009 with the Association of Staff in Tertiary Education.
Bakers & Pastrycooks Union	Merged into First Union in 2018.
Bridgestone Rubber Workers Union,	Previously known as the Firestone Employees Society. Dissolved in 2010 following the late 2009 closure of the Christchurch Bridgestone-Firestone factory.
Cape Foulwind Drivers, Operators and General Workers Union	Dissolved following the June 2016 closure of the Cape Foulwind cement works.
Clothing, Laundry and Allied Workers Union of Aotearoa	Merged into the National Distribution Union in 2007.
Corrections Association of New Zealand	Disaffiliated.
Customs Officers' Association of New Zealand	Disaffiliated mid 2016.
Engineering, Printing and Manufacturing Union (EPMU)	Amalgamated with Service & Food Workers Union Nga Ringa Tota Inc. (SFWU) in October 2015 to form E tū.
Flight Attendants & Related Services Association (FARSA)	Merged with E Tū in 2016.
Finance and Information Workers Union (finsec)	Amalgamated with National Distribution Union (NDU) in 2011 to form FIRST Union).
National Distribution Union (NDU)	Amalgamated with Finsec in 2011 to form FIRST Union).
NZ Building Trades Union (NZBTU)	Amalgamated into EPMU in 2011, deregistered in 2013, deregistration revoked in 2014, deregistered again in 2018.
Northern Chemical Workers Union	Voted in October 1992 to disaffiliate from the CTU citing a failure of the CTU to lead resistance against government policies.
Service & Food Workers Union Nga Ringa Tota Inc. (SFWU)	Amalgamated with EPMU in October 2015 to form E Tū.
Southern Local Government Officers Union (SLGOU)	Merged into the PSA on 1 April 2015.

== Founding members ==
Name	Membership (31 March 1989)
Actors Equity	721
Airline Stewards and Hostesses Union	1653
Association of Teachers in Technical Institutions	2755
Bank Officers Union New Zealand	19329
Biscuit and Confectionary Union Nelson	100
Chemical Workers Union Northern	1364
Clerical Workers Union New Zealand	35287
Dairy Workers Union (NZDWU)	5490
Dental Assistants Union Auckland	300
Dental Assistants Union Northern	Not provided
Dietetic Association New Zealand	201
Distribution Workers Union Central	8506
Distribution Workers Union Northern	23234
Distribution Workers Union Southern	6363
Drivers Union Blenheim	225
Drivers Union Nelson	516
Drivers Union Canterbury	2255
Drivers Union Hawkes Bay	1026
Drivers Union Southland	884
Drivers Union Taranaki	690
Early Childhood NZ	997
Educational Institute New Zealand	17250
Engine Drivers Union New Zealand	1136
Engineers Union	40000
Fire Brigadesmen Central	748
Fire Brigadesmen North	865
Fire Brigadesmen South Island	591
Food and Chemical Workers Union New Zealand	10000
Footwear Workers Union	2081
Freezing Workers Union Auckland and Tomoana	5418
Furniture Workers Union Northern	2800
Furniture Workers Union Southland and Otago	302
Harbour Workers Union New Zealand	2554
Hospital Engineers Association New Zealand	150
Ice Cream Workers Union New Zealand	200
Journalists Union Northern	1060
Journalists Union New Zealand	1275
Kindergarten Teachers Association New Zealand	949
Labourers Local Bodies Auckland	1650
Labourers New Zealand	15089
Local Bodies Officers Southern	1842
Local Bodies Officers Wellington, Marlborough, Nelson, Taranaki and West Coast	7060
Local Government Officers Union	10444
Locomotive Engineers Association New Zealand	1699
Meat Processors and Related Trades Union New Zealand	21306
Mine Workers Union New Zealand	741
Moulders Union Otago and Southland	112
Nurses Association New Zealand	18500
Nurses Union New Zealand	9592
Photo Lithographers Union New Zealand	1050
Post Office Union	38000
Post Primary Teachers Association	11700
Projectionists Union North Island	170
Public Service Association	70021
Pulp and Paper Workers Union New Zealand	1731
Railway Officers Institute New Zealand	3372
Railway Traders Union New Zealand	1700
Service Workers Union New Zealand	69054
Shop Employees Union Blenheim	315
Shop Employees Union Otago, Southland and Invercargill	3100
Sugar Workers Union Auckland	140
Teachers College Association New Zealand	358
Technical Institutions Allied Staff Association	751
Theatrical Union Northern	554
Timber Workers Union Nelson	621
Timber Workers Union Westland	455
Tramways Union New Zealand	1800
University Library Staff Union	268
University Technicians Union	1267
Woollen Mills Union New Zealand	5489
Workers Union New Zealand	12501
Writers Guild New Zealand	155
