= Post Primary Teachers' Association =

Trade union in New Zealand

PPTA
- Post Primary Teachers' Association
- Te Wehengarua
- Founded: 1952; 74 years ago
- Headquarters: Wellington, New Zealand
- Location: New Zealand
- Members: 25,000
- President: Chris Abercrombie
- Affiliations: NZCTU, EI
- Website: ppta.org.nz

The Post Primary Teachers Association (PPTA; Māori: Te Wehengarua) is a trade union in New Zealand and professional association. It represents about 25,000 which is around 90% of teachers employed in state and integrated secondary schools, area schools, technology centres and community education centres. The PPTA is affiliated with the New Zealand Council of Trade Unions and Education International.

Around 35% of their members are male and around 65% of their members are female. They provide a professional network for teachers, legal advice, employment relations education and dispute resolution along with discounts at certain retailers.
