= Service & Food Workers Union =

Trade union in New Zealand

SFWU Nga Ringa Tota
- Service & Food Workers Union Nga Ringa Tota
- Merged into: E tū
- Dissolved: October 2015
- Headquarters: Auckland, New Zealand
- Location: New Zealand
- Members: 23,000+
- Key people: John Ryall, National Secretary
- Affiliations: NZCTU, Labour Party
- Website: www.sfwu.org

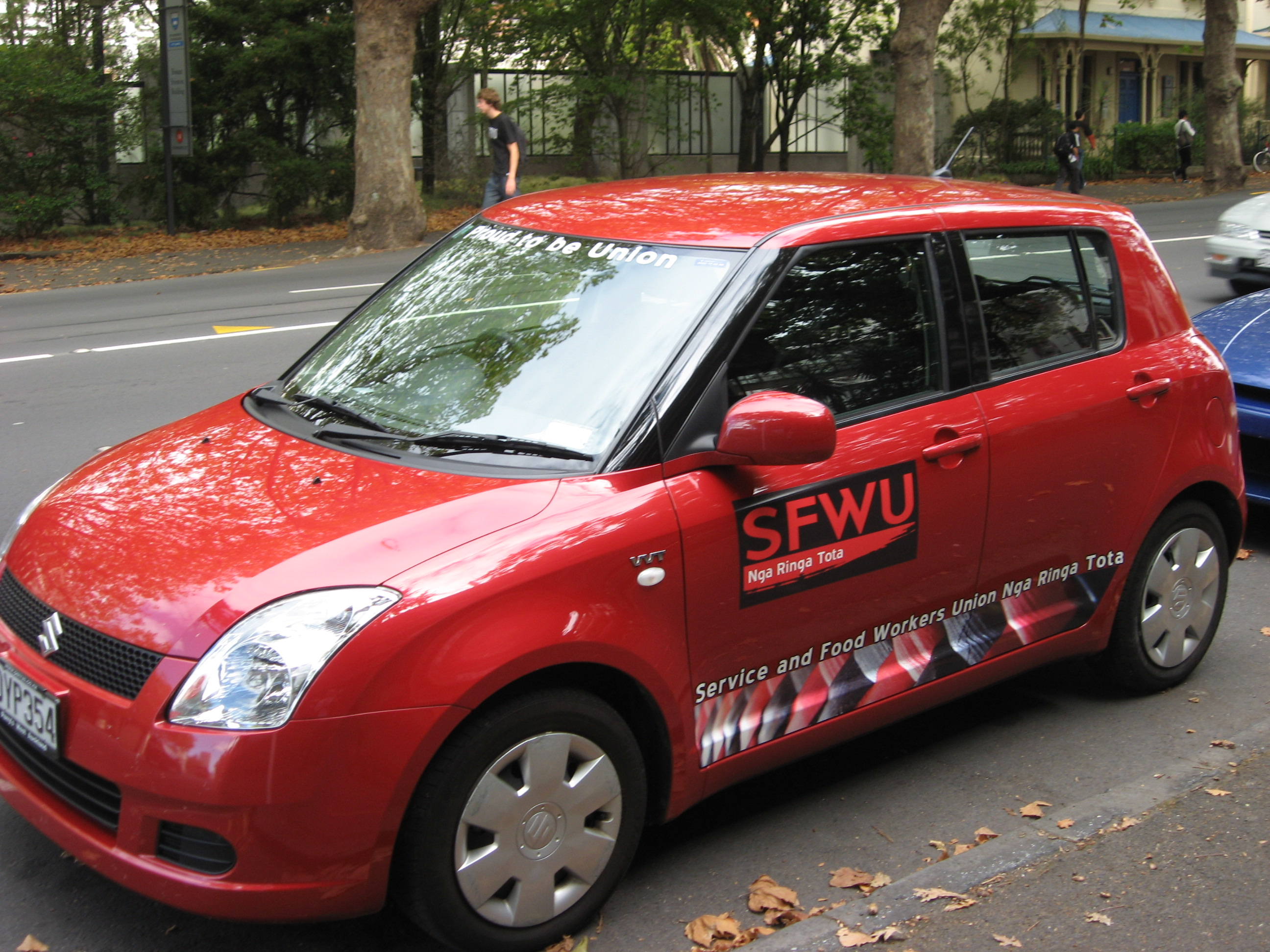
A car with the livery of the Service & Food Workers Union

The Service & Food Workers Union Nga Ringa Tota (SFWU) was a trade union in New Zealand. It was affiliated with the New Zealand Council of Trade Unions and the New Zealand Labour Party.

The SFWU was organised into five industry sectors:

- Age Care, Disability, Health & Community Services
- Catering, Cleaning and Contract Services
- Clerical, Administration & Technical Services
- Food & Beverage Manufacturing & Processing
- Hospitality, Tourism & Entertainment Services

The Service & Food Workers Union filed a case with the Employment Court against Terranova, a rest home operator, in relation to allegations that it paid its caregivers lower wages that it would otherwise pay if its work force was not predominantly made up of women. The case went all the way to the Court of Appeal of New Zealand, where it was upheld in 2015. The government then took it on itself to negotiate a settlement, which was announced in April 2017 as "the largest pay increase in New Zealand's history".

In October 2015, the Service & Food Workers Union merged with the Engineering, Printing and Manufacturing Union to form E tū.
