= Engineering, Printing and Manufacturing Union =

New Zealand trade union

EPMU
- Engineering, Printing and Manufacturing Union
- Founded: 1996
- Dissolved: October 2015
- Location: New Zealand
- Members: 46,000
- Key people: Don Pryde, president Bill Newson, national secretary
- Affiliations: NZCTU, Labour Party
- Website: www.epmu.org.nz

The Engineering, Printing and Manufacturing Union (EPMU) was the largest private sector trade union in New Zealand. It was formed in 1996 by the merger of the Engineers' Union (EU), the Printing, Packaging and Manufacturing Union (PPMU), and the Communications and Energy Workers' Union (CEWU).

The EPMU represented workers in eleven industries, including:

- Engineering
- Print & Media
- Manufacturing
- Telecommunications
- Timber
- Aviation
- Plastics
- Postal & Logistics
- Petrochemical & Extractive
- Public Services & Infrastructure
- Food

The EPMU had 40,000 members and was affiliated with the New Zealand Council of Trade Unions and the New Zealand Labour Party. It was also an affiliate of the International Federation of Journalists. In October 2015, it merged with the Service & Food Workers Union to form E tū.
