= 1951 New Zealand waterfront dispute =

Industrial dispute

The 1951 New Zealand waterfront dispute was the largest and most widespread industrial dispute in New Zealand history. Over the period, up to 20,000 workers went on strike in support of waterfront workers protesting against financial hardships and poor working conditions. Thousands more refused to handle "scab" goods. The dispute was sometimes referred to as the waterfront lockout or waterfront strike. It lasted 151 days, from 13 February to 15 July 1951. During the lockout, the Watersiders' Union was deregistered and its funds and records were seized, and 26 local watersiders' unions were set up in its place.

In reviewing the biography of Jock Barnes, then-president of the Waterside Workers' Union, reviewer Tony Simpson described the lockout as "a key element in the mythologies of the industrial left in this country".

== Background ==
The distance of New Zealand and Australia from their traditional markets meant that ports played a pivotal role in the economies of the countries. The waterfront inevitably became a point of conflict between workers and their unions on one side, and the employers and the state on the other.

During the Second World War due to labour shortages, watersiders and other workers worked long hours, often as much as 15-hour days. However, in working American ships, the waterside workers had also been exposed to new work methods and technologies that were commonplace on American wharves. British shipowners were reluctant to invest in these new methods, and expected watersiders to go back to the traditional methods in use before the war. The union instead resolved to make work practices on wharves change.

Following the war, working hours on the wharves continued to be high, with shipowners expecting up to 59 hours a week be worked. In the immediate post-war period, one of the main goals of the Waterside Workers' Union was to have a guaranteed weekly wage and a 40-hour, five day, work week between the hours of 8am and 5pm, without night or weekend overtime. Dissatisfaction with the Waterfront Industry Commission's refusal to accept the watersiders' proposal led to ongoing waterfront disputes over several years. The Waterside Workers' Union struggle led to criticism from the Federation of Labour (FOL) that the union's actions might not be in the best interests of its members and posed a risk to the whole labour movement.

At the November 1949 general elections, a conservative National party government came to power. While the new government's opposition to militant unionism probably made an industrial confrontation inevitable, the outgoing Labour government's earlier decision to hold a referendum on compulsory military service in August 1949 had been seen by many trade unionists who opposed conscription as a betrayal of their socialist beliefs.

In April 1950 the Waterside Workers' Union led a walk out of the FOL and set up their own Trade Union Congress, isolating themselves from the wider union movement. Shortly afterwards severe stoppages on the wharves occurred, infuriating most of the general population. In early September, Wellington watersiders refused to work a cargo of lamp-black, with this dispute eventually leading to watersiders at all ports stopping work. On 19 September, the government warned it would declare a state of emergency the following day if watersiders did not return to work the next morning. Late that evening, Labour Party leader Peter Fraser intervened and a deputation of union leaders met with Prime Minister Holland. Although a state of emergency existed between 20 September and 4 October while negotiations took place, this meeting opened the way to a settlement.

On 31 January 1951, the Arbitration Court issued a general wage order to increase wages by 15% for workers covered by the industrial arbitration system. The order took effect on 15 February 1951 but was backdated to awards as they stood at 7 May 1950, and cancelled a 5% interim wage order the court had previously issued in June 1950 that had taken effect from 8 May 1950. Awards for freezing workers and two other unions that had recently received "substantial increases" were excluded. In reaching its decision the Arbitration Court said it had to consider equity for workers, the stability of the New Zealand economy, terms of trade with Britain, as well as inflationary pressure. The compromise decision was recognised as inadequate by the unions' representative, while the employers' representative dissented, considering it inflationary.

== The dispute ==
The wage increase ordered by the Arbitration Court did not apply to waterside workers, whose employment was controlled by the Waterfront Industry Commission. The shipping companies that employed the watersiders instead offered 9%, the difference between the 6% wage increase that had previously been awarded to the watersiders after the interim wage order and the general wage order. The watersiders then refused to work overtime in protest, and the employers placed the men on a two-day penalty. The workers called it a lockout, the employers called it a strike. When the Waterside Workers' Union refused to accept arbitration, the government could make a stand on the principle of defending industrial law and order.

On 8 February 1951, in protest to the employers wage offer, the Wellington and New Plymouth branches of the Waterside Workers Union unilaterally decided to impose overtime bans at their ports and asked other branches to do the same. The union executive met on 13 February to consider the responses from branches about the wage increase, and at 2 PM sent telegrams to all branches advising to impose an overtime ban from 5 PM. Upon being advised of this, the employers advised that if the overtime ban continued the next day then the workers would be stood down for two days as a penalty, and could only be eligible for work again on Saturday morning.

While workers at Auckland and Wellington were not asked to work overtime on 14 February due to Harbour Board employees at those ports holding meetings, workers at other ports were penalised for refusing overtime. On 15 February, workers at Auckland and Wellington ports also refused overtime and were penalised. The union claimed that the employers actions were a lockout because while union members were willing to work 40 hours a week, the employers were only allowing them to work 16 hours a week. The Minister of Labour Bill Sullivan then invited representatives of both the union and employers to meet with him and the then Acting-Prime Minister Keith Holyoake on the morning of the 16th in an attempt to resolve the dispute.

=== Political response ===
The lockout was a major political issue of the time. The National government, led by Sidney Holland and the Minister of Labour Bill Sullivan, introduced heavy handed emergency regulations, and brought in the navy and army to work the wharves and also deregistered the Waterside Workers' Union under the Industrial Conciliation and Arbitration Act. Under the emergency regulations Holland's government censored the press, made striking illegal, and even made it illegal to give money or food to either strikers or their families. The proclamations have been described as "the most illiberal legislation ever enacted in New Zealand".

In a surprise move, the FOL, which was supported by the majority of unions, backed the government. FOL President Fintan Patrick Walsh was of the opinion that the manner of the strike threatened the existing arbitration system necessitating their defeat. The watersiders held out for 22 weeks, supported by many other unions and sympathy strikers, but ultimately conceded defeat. The miners and seamen who held sympathy strikes were likewise beaten.

As a result, the Waterside Workers' Union was split up into twenty-six separate "port unions" to deliberately diminish its influence. Many watersiders and other unionists involved were blacklisted (e.g. Jock Barnes and Toby Hill) and prevented from working on the wharves for years afterwards.

=== Snap election ===
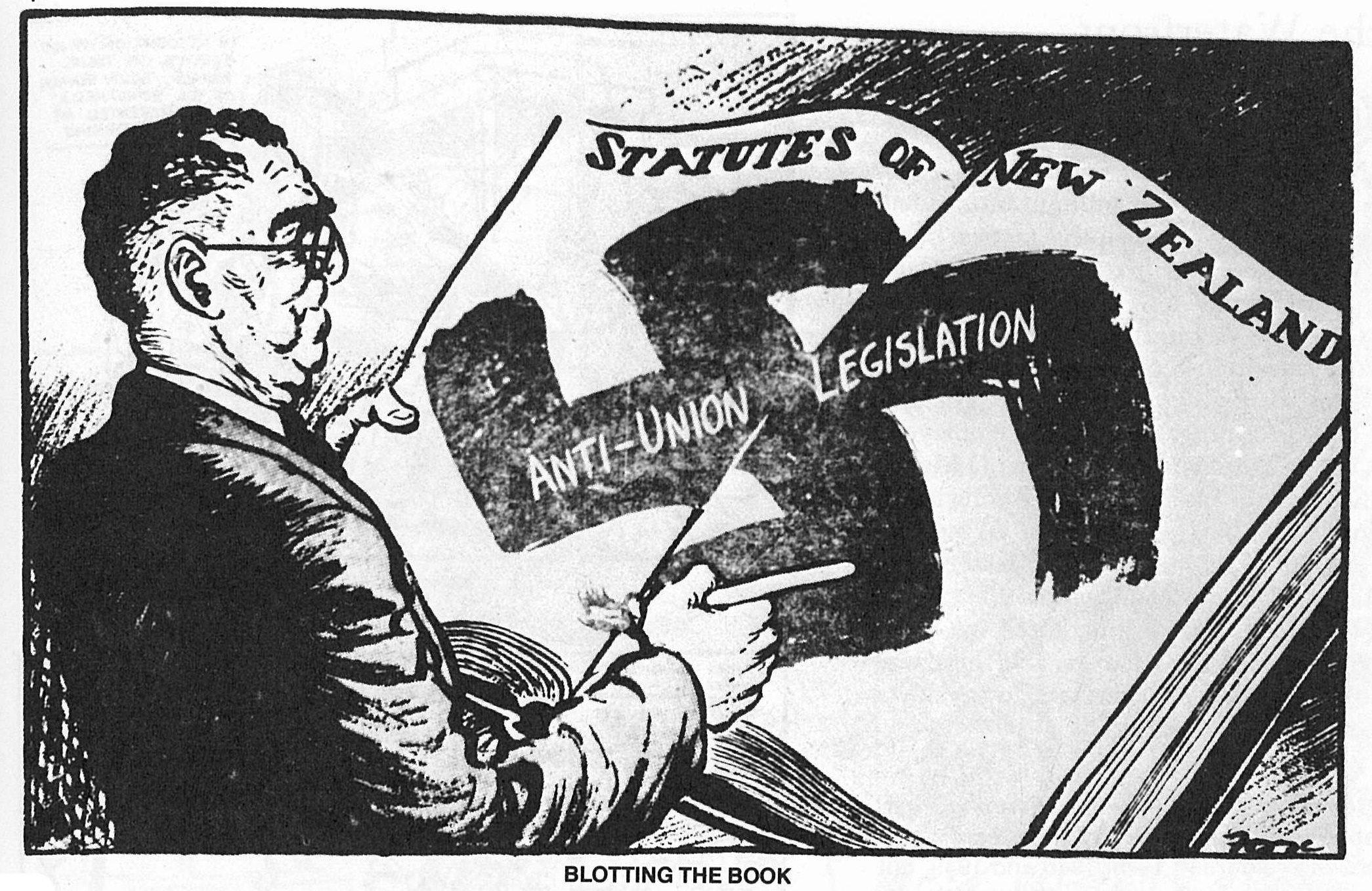
A cartoon comparing Holland's reaction to the strike to Nazism

Holland condemned the action as "industrial anarchy", and explicitly sought a mandate to deal with the lockout by calling a snap election. The opposition Labour Party, now led by Walter Nash, attempted to take a moderate position in the dispute, with Nash saying that "we are not for the waterside workers, and we are not against them". Labour's neutral position merely ended up displeasing both sides, however, and Nash was widely accused of indecision and lack of courage. The government was re-elected with an increased majority in the ensuing 1951 election.

== Aftermath ==
Militant unionism in New Zealand was crushed in the wake of the strike, and the union movement remained fractured for years between the FOL and the defeated militants. The Labour Party was likewise split between the ardent anti-Communists, led by Bob Semple and Angus McLagan, and the moderates, such as Walter Nash and Arnold Nordmeyer. There was a concurrent tension between the FOL and the Labour Party for many years following the strike.

Much later it emerged that the families of both Keith Locke and Mark Blumsky were under surveillance by the Police Special Branch (now the New Zealand Security Intelligence Service).

=== Loyalty cards ===
After the dispute was over, the deregistered Waterside Workers' Union issued loyalty cards to those who had remained loyal to the union during the dispute. Many retained their cards, and at an anniversary dinner in 1976 admission was by "card only".

=== Official history ===
In the wake of the dispute, Dick Scott, editor of the union's magazine "Transport Worker", wrote a book about the strike on behalf of the deregistered union titled 151 Days - Official History of The Great Waterfront Lockout and Supporting Strikes, February 15 - July 15, 1951. The New Zealand Federation of Labour annual conference in 1954 condemned the book for its derogatory statements and factual omissions. Scott's credentials to attend the conference as a union delegate were also challenged, and he was called upon to withdraw and apologise, which he refused to do, and was censured as a result. The book was reprinted in 1978.

== See also ==
- Jock Barnes
- Toby Hill
- Fintan Patrick Walsh
- Huntly rail bridge bombing
- 1913 Great Strike
