= Terrorism Suppression Act 2002 =

Act of the Parliament of New Zealand

New Zealand Parliament
- Long title: The purpose of this Act is— (a) to make further provision in New Zealand law for the suppression of terrorism; and (b) to make provision to implement in New Zealand law New Zealand's obligations under— (i) the Bombings Convention; and (ii) the Financing Convention; and (iii) the Anti-terrorism Resolution; and (iv) the Nuclear Material Convention; and (v) the Plastic Explosives Convention; and (vi) the Nuclear Terrorism Convention; and (c) to make further provision to implement, in part, the Al-Qaida and the Taliban Sanctions Resolutions.
- Royal assent: 17 October 2002
- Status: Current legislation

The Terrorism Suppression Act 2002 is New Zealand counter-terrorism legislation passed under the Clark-led Labour government. Enacted following the September 11 attacks in the United States, the Act was designed to better address contemporary terrorism issues, both domestically and abroad. Until May 2019, the Act had not been formally used in a prosecution; however there were several failed attempts by the Crown to do so. Many individuals and organisations have however been designated as "Terrorist entities" under the Act's provisions, in line with UN Security Council designations. The Act was amended in 2007. In May 2019, a charge of engaging in a terrorist act was laid against Brenton Tarrant, the perpetrator of the Christchurch mosque attacks, under section 6A of the Act.

== Background ==
New Zealand, considered a relatively 'safe' country, has experienced few terrorist incidents in its short history. Prior to 2001, incidents included the bombings of a rail bridge near Huntly in 1951, the Wanganui Computer Centre in 1982, the Wellington Trades Hall in 1984 and the Greenpeace vessel The Rainbow Warrior in 1985. Due to these incidents, New Zealand had already established prior to this act, "A comprehensive legislative and substantive counter-terrorist framework..." However the growth of international terrorism in recent years, alluded to by then Minister of Foreign Affairs and Trade Phil Goff in the bill's first reading, gave rise to the need to introduce new, "comprehensive" anti-terror legislation. The examples he gave were the Lockerbie bombing, the World Trade Centre bombing and the Nairobi embassy attack.

== Passage ==
=== Introduction ===
Goff introduced the Terrorism (bombings and financing) bill to parliament on 3 May 2001. Seen by many as simply the enactment of two recent international conventions, the bill was considered unremarkable and garnered widespread lukewarm support. The bill was then sent to the Foreign Affairs, Defence and Trade select committee for review and submissions.

== September 11 attacks and select committee ==
The day of the attacks, a special ministerial statement session was held at the beginning of parliament, in which Deputy Prime Minister Jim Anderton, amongst others, gave their condolences for those killed, with Anderton moving a motion to express New Zealand's "shock and horror" at the events. What followed was a dramatic shift in pace at the select committee level, with many submitters feeling that they did not have enough time to review and make submissions on the increasing amendments that the committee was making in the wake of the attacks. Proponents of the bill claimed that this urgency was a matter of necessity given the threat posed by terrorism, however opponents claimed that this legislative process eroded the public's right to proper consultation. For instance in its submission on the bill the Women's International League for Peace and Freedom (Aotearoa), an organisation with consultative status with the United Nations, claimed to be, "dismayed at the extremely short length of time" and did not, "consider such a time period to be sufficient for...such a complex, and extreme, piece of legislation." This was echoed in the submission by the Human Rights Commission, stating that, "There has been limited opportunity for public discussion and preparation of submissions." Nonetheless, the New Zealand government, following several other governments around the world, broadened its own powers in the bill. Greener-Barcham claims that this was in order, "To be part of a broader anti-terrorist effort" and to, "Strengthen ties with 'like-minded states'" following the September 11 attacks and President Bush's call to arms. This shift in mentality was reflected in the bill's renaming from the Terrorism (Bombing and Financing) bill to the Terrorism Suppression bill.

=== Final readings and royal assent ===
Due to the alterations made in the select committee stage, the bill became hotly debated during the committee of the whole house. For example, Green Party Member of Parliament Keith Locke proposed (unsuccessfully) an amendment which would have changed the bill's name to the, "Civil Liberties Reduction" bill. Despite strong dissent from the Green Party, the bill passed its third reading on 8 October 2002 with multi-party support and 106 votes in favour, with only the 9 Green votes against. The bill received royal assent and became an act on 17 October 2002.

== Content of Act ==
=== Part 1 ===
Part 1, "Preliminary Provisions," deals with the purpose of the act and its interpretation.

=== Part 2 ===
Part 2, "Suppression of Terrorism," forms the substantive part of the act's offences. It also deals with some of the other most significant aspects of the act, the designation of terrorist entities, organisations and individuals, in sections 20–42. It creates the offences of:

- Section 7: terrorist bombing
- Section 8: financing terrorism
- Section 9: dealing with terrorist property
- Section 10: making property available to a terrorist entity
- Section 12: recruiting members for terrorist groups
- Section 13: participating in a terrorist group
- Section 13A-D: harbouring terrorists, using plastic explosives, protecting or acquiring radioactive materials

=== Part 3 ===
Part 3, "Miscellaneous provisions," deals primarily with the obligations on the New Zealand attorney general. These include to:

- Section 64: Indicate if New Zealand will exercise jurisdiction under the act
- Section 65: Give notification if an individual is taken into custody under the act
- Section 67: Give permission for prosecutions under the act
- Section 68: Communicate the outcome of any such prosecution

The penalties within the act are severe, with most offences carrying either 14 years or life imprisonment (the harshest penalty available in New Zealand).

== 2007 New Zealand police raids ==
In October 2007, the NZ Police carried out several raids across New Zealand and arrested 17 individuals, charging them under the Terror Suppression Act for involvement in so-called "military style training camps." For the prosecutions to go ahead the attorney general's consent under section 67 of the act was required. Under delegated authority from then Attorney General Michael Cullen, then solicitor general David Collins announced on 8 November 2007 that he was:

...Unable to authorise the prosecutions that have been sought under the Terrorism Suppression Act. There is insufficient evidence to establish to the very high standard required that a group or entity was planning or preparing to commit a terrorist act, as that term is defined in the legislation.

As a result of this decision, the charges under the act were dropped as were any form of prosecution of the vast majority of those arrested. Only firearms charges against four of the accused were eventually successful. Because of Collin's criticism that the act was, "Unnecessarily complex" and, "Incoherent" he recommended the act be sent to the law commission for review.

== Amendment Act 2007 ==
Following the 2007 raids, the government introduced a major overhaul of the act (an amendment bill was already before parliament). The amendment was to correct inconsistencies with UN and UN Security Council requirements and replace the role of the High Court in extending terrorist designations with the prime minister. It also introduced new "nuclear material" provisions. Of most significance was the amendment's redefining of several of the offences in the act:

- Section 12 (recruiting members of a terrorist group) now simply required a designated terrorist entity (DTE)
- Section 13 (participating in a terrorist group) introduced a recklessness component alongside knowledge, as well as only requiring a DTE

In doing so, the threshold to commit either offence was considerably lowered, in large part to correct the issues highlighted by the solicitor general. The Terrorism Suppression Amendment Act 2007 came into force on 19 November 2007.

== Criticism ==
The Act as a whole has been criticised by some as placing too much power in the hands of the executive. Whereas the court formerly made findings of fact, in regards to the designation of terrorist entities the responsibility has been given to the prime minister. Such a designation carries with it strict penalties under the act in terms of association and membership. Some have claimed that this may lead to the act being used politically to quell dissidents rather than actual terrorists. Human rights groups have also raised concerns over whether convictions based on a wrongful designation will nevertheless remain upheld. The most recent periodic review of the act (in line with the review regime within the act) was cancelled in 2013 by then Justice Minister Judith Collins. Green Party co-leader Russel Norman claims this is because the government "is unwilling to risk further public scrutiny of the state's search and surveillance powers."

== See also ==
- USA PATRIOT Act
- Anti-Terrorism Act 2005
- Counter-Terrorism Legislation Act 2021
