= Bill Sullivan (politician) =

New Zealand politician (1891–1967)

The Honourable Sir Bill Sullivan KCMG
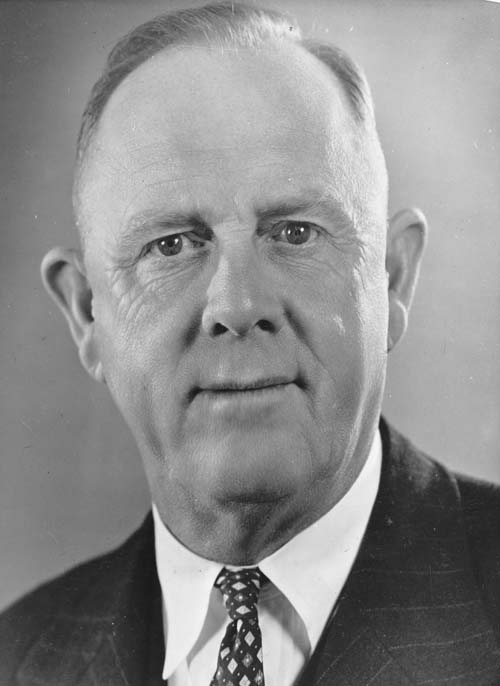

18th Minister of Labour
- In office 13 December 1949 – 13 February 1957
- Prime Minister: Sidney Holland
- Preceded by: Angus McLagan
- Succeeded by: John McAlpine

Member of the New Zealand Parliament for Bay of Plenty
- In office 13 December 1941 – 13 February 1957
- Preceded by: Gordon Hultquist
- Succeeded by: Percy Allen

Mayor of Whakatāne
- In office 1925–1938
- Preceded by: John Moffat Turnbull
- Succeeded by: Brian Barry

Personal details
- Born: 8 December 1891 Inglewood, New Zealand
- Died: 17 March 1967 (aged 75) Whakatāne, New Zealand
- Party: National
- Other political affiliations: United (1928–1936)
- Spouse: Elvina Coral Brayshaw (m. 1916)

Sir William Sullivan KCMG (8 December 1891 – 17 March 1967), was a New Zealand politician of the National Party. A man of large stature, he was affectionately known as "Big Bill".

== Biography ==
He was born in Inglewood in 1891 to Irish parents Samuel John Sullivan and Sarah Maria (née Acton). Sullivan received his education in Inglewood and Stratford. He was a Taranaki rugby representative and maintained an interest in the sport all his life. He served in World War I in the New Zealand Expeditionary Force (NZEF) and in World War II at Trentham Military Camp in New Zealand.

In 1917 he set up a construction company in the Bay of Plenty, and in Whakatāne he was Mayor 1925–1938, the Harbour Board Chairman 1923–1926 and on the Council for almost 26 years. He was also the president of the Whakatane Chamber of Commerce. In 1935, he was awarded the King George V Silver Jubilee Medal.

=== Member of Parliament ===
New Zealand Parliament
Years	Term	Electorate	Party
1941–1943	26th	Bay of Plenty	National
1943–1946	27th	Bay of Plenty	National
1946–1949	28th	Bay of Plenty	National
1949–1951	29th	Bay of Plenty	National
1951–1954	30th	Bay of Plenty	National
1954–1957	31st	Bay of Plenty	National

Sullivan was one of three candidates in the 1931 election in the Tauranga electorate. He was a member of the United Party, but Charles Macmillan was the official candidate of the United–Reform Coalition, hence Sullivan stood as an Independent. He was defeated by Macmillan. Sullivan represented the Bay of Plenty electorate from a 1941 by-election after the death of Gordon Hultquist to 13 February 1957, when he resigned following the death of his son who ran the family construction business.

He was the Minister of Labour, Immigration, Mines, Housing and the State Advances Corporation in the First National Government from 1949 to 1957. He was one of the "big four" (alongside Sidney Holland, Keith Holyoake and Clifton Webb) in cabinet and was allocated some of the most demanding portfolios. Consequently, he had a large amount of influence over the governments policy and direction.

As Minister of Labour he had to face the challenge of industrial disruption by union militancy. Tensions on the wharves with waterfront workers ahead of the export season grew and on 20 September 1950 the government invoked the 1932 Public Safety Conservation Act during the so-called 'lampblack dispute' to resolve the faceoff. Sullivan, believing in the authority of government, won a reputation for toughness for his response stating "It just cannot go on. No self respecting government could tolerate it". The lampblack dispute was resolved, but disruption on the waterfront continues. The government invoked the Public Safety Conservation Act again on 21 February 1951, the next day gazetting emergency regulations which gave Sullivan sweeping powers during the ensuing period of the 1951 Waterfront dispute. Seven days later it deregistered the militant New Zealand Waterside Workers’ Union and ordered for the military to work the wharves instead. Sullivan faced threats to himself and his family, but refused to deal with the union's leaders, Jock Barnes and Toby Hill. Finally, after 151 days, the watersiders were defeated and the dispute ended. Sullivan's forthright response proved decisive during one of the most intense political crises in New Zealand's history. In 1954 he reported that cargo handling was up by an average of 25% and the waterfront had lost only 6,300 hours that year to disputes, compared with the 294,600 working hours lost in 1949.

Sullivan was seen as leadership material being straight-talking, tough, energetic and resolute and when Prime Minister Sidney Holland's health began to fail Sullivan was speculated as being a possible replacement Prime Minister. However, by the time Holland retired, reluctantly, Sullivan had already resigned from Parliament ruling out the possibility of a candidature.

In 1953, Sullivan was awarded the Queen Elizabeth II Coronation Medal.

=== Later life and death ===
He was appointed Knight Commander of the Order of St Michael and St George in the 1957 Queen's Birthday Honours. After leaving parliament he returned to running the timber and hardware business he founded forty years earlier.

He died in Whakatane on 17 March 1967. He had been ill for several months and was survived by a son and three daughters.

== Personal life ==
On 12 September 1916, Sullivan married Elvina Coral Brayshaw at Stratford. They had a family of three daughters and four sons. Three of his sons died before him, and his wife died in 1963.

== Notes ==
Political offices
Preceded by Angus McLagan	Minister of Labour; 1949–1957	Succeeded by John McAlpine
Preceded by Angus McLagan	Minister of Mines; 1949–1957	Succeeded by John McAlpine
Preceded by Angus McLagan	Minister of Immigration; 1949–1954	Succeeded by Ralph Hanan
New Zealand Parliament
Preceded by Gordon Hultquist	Member of Parliament for Bay of Plenty; 1941–1957	Succeeded by Percy Allen
