= Mayor of Whakatāne =

Head of New Zealand's Whakatāne District

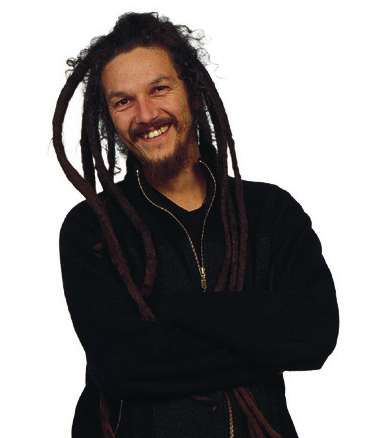
- Incumbent; Nándor Tánczos since 2025
- Style: His/Her Worship
- Term length: Three years, renewable
- Inaugural holder: George Brabant
- Formation: 1917
- Deputy: Julie Jukes
- Salary: $142,977
- Website: Official website

The mayor of Whakatāne is the head of the municipal government in Whakatāne District, New Zealand. The mayor presides over the Whakatāne District Council, which was first formed in 1976 following an amalgamation, with further changes taking place in 1989.

The current mayor of Whakatāne is Nándor Tánczos, who was elected in 2025.

== Role ==
The mayor of Whakatāne leads the Whakatāne District Council which includes the deputy mayor and nine councillors. The mayor is a member of all of the council's committees excluding the Hearings Committee and is deputy chairperson of the Policy Committee and chairperson of the Audit and Risk Committee. Additionally, the mayor is a member of joint committees and groups including the Bay of Plenty Civil Defence Emergency Management Group, the Regional Transport Committee, the Commercial Advisory Board, and the Eastern Bay of Plenty Joint Committee (which is composed of members of the Whakatane, Kawerau, and Opotiki District Councils and the Bay of Plenty Regional Council).

Elections for the mayor take place every three years as part of the local elections in New Zealand, with the last election being held in 2025. The mayor received a salary of $121,899 plus expenses as of 2020, and holds the title of His/Her Worship.

== Lists of mayors ==
The following are the mayors of Whakatāne since 1917. Prior to this, the town of Whakatāne was part of Whakatane County. In 1914 the Whakatane Town Board was formed, and it ceded from Whakatane County the following year. The town board was headed by a chairman. Whakatane Borough Council was formed in 1917, headed by a mayor. Whakatane Borough and Whakatane County merged with the Whakatane Harbour Board in 1976 forming the Whakatane District Council. In 1989 the Whakatane District Council amalgamated with Murupara Borough Council and also added a portion of the Opotiki District and a portion of the Taupo District, forming the Whakatane District Council as it is today.

Bill Sullivan was chairman of the Whakatane Harbour Board (1923–1926) and mayor of the Whakatane Borough Council (1925–1938) before representing the Bay of Plenty electorate in the House of Representatives (1941–1957).

=== Whakatane Borough Council ===
No.	Name	Portrait	Term
1	George Brabant		1917–1919
2	Frank Moore		1919–1921
3	William Richards Boon		1921–1923
4	Douglas Charles Chalmers		1923–1925
5	John Moffat Turnbull		1925
6	Bill Sullivan		1925–1938
7	Brian Barry		1938–1950
8	Sidney Shapley		1950–1956
9	Harry Warren		1956–1965
10	Rex Morpeth		1965–1976

=== Whakatāne District Council ===
No.	Name	Portrait	Term
1	Rex Morpeth		1976–1980
2	Jack Gow		1980–1986
3	Bob Byrne		1986–1989
4	Lorraine Brill		1989–1992
5	Don Herdman		1992–1995
6	Tony Bonne		1995–1998
7	Colin Hammond		1998–2004
8	Colin Holmes		2004–2010
(6)	Tony Bonne		2010–2019
9	Judy Turner		2019–2022
10	Victor Luca		2022–2025
11	Nándor Tánczos		2025–present

== List of deputy mayors ==
=== Whakatane Borough Council ===
The Whakatāne District Council records that there were 12 deputy mayors on the Whakatane Borough Council between 1923 and 1976, with F. B. Cutler being the first to serve in the role from 1923 to 1931. However, L. Duddle was noted as the town's deputy mayor in February 1920 as the mayor, Frank Moore, had left for Wellington the previous Friday. In August 1923, former mayor William Richards Boon was recorded as the deputy mayor, with the mayor having been absent. George Brabant was noted as deputy mayor in both 1924 and 1925, whereas Bill Sullivan served as the deputy mayor in 1925 until he was elected mayor in the same year, (Note: Bill Sullivan became mayor in 1925 after serving as deputy mayor. However, his tenure as borough councillor began in the same year, meaning he must have become deputy mayor in 1925 as well.) which means Cutler cannot have served continuously in those roles during those years.

Cutler is noted as having been elected as deputy mayor in 1929, however, it is not known whether this was a first-time appointment or a reappointment. Consequently, it is difficult to determine when Cutler served in the role.

Name	Term	Mayor
L. Duddle	c. January 1920–c. February 1920	Moore
William Richards Boon	c. August 1923	Chalmers
George Brabant	c. 1924–1925	Boon
Bill Sullivan	1925 (Note: Bill Sullivan became mayor in 1925 after serving as deputy mayor. However, his tenure as borough councillor began in the same year, meaning he must have become deputy mayor in 1925 as well.)	Turnbull
F. B. Cutler	1929?–1931?	Sullivan
John Arres	1933–1938	Sullivan
Sidney Shapley	1938–1947	Barry
Charles Armstrong	1947–1950	Barry
Aubrey O'Rourke	1950–1956	Shapley
C. H. Brebner	1956–1959	Warren
Alfred Judd	1959–1962	Warren
R. A. Niederer	1962–1968	Warren
R. A. Niederer	1962–1968	Morpeth
F. A. Bridges	1968–1971	Morpeth
F. G. Cutler	1971–1973	Morpeth
D. J. McGlashen	1973–1974	Morpeth
Bob Byrne	1974–1976	Morpeth

=== Whakatāne District Council ===
Since the inception of the council in 1976, there have been 13 deputy mayors:

No.	Name	Term	Mayor
1	Jack Gow	1976–1980	Morpeth
2	Bob Byrne	1980–1983	Gow
3	J. R. Rainford	1983–1986	Gow
4	W. P. Tait	1986–1989	Byrne
5	Don Herdman	1989–1992	Brill
6	B. A. Guy	1992–1995	Herdman
7	Christine Chambers	1995–2001	Bonne
7	Christine Chambers	1995–2001	Hammond
8	Brian Birkett	2001–2004	Hammond
9	Graeme Hanlen	2004–2010	Holmes
10	Judy Turner	2010–2019	Bonne
11	Andrew Iles	2019–2022	Turner
12	Lesley Immink	2022–2025	Luca
13	Julie Jukes	2025–present	Tánczos
