= Ngahuia (given name) =

Ngahuia is a Māori female given name. In Maori stories, Ngahuia was a chieftainess who died young, leaving her several small children motherless.

== People with the name Ngahuia ==
- Ngahuia Harrison (born 1988), a New Zealand photographer
- Ngahuia Murphy, a New Zealand researcher
- Ngahuia Piripi, New Zealand television actress
- Ngahuia Te Awekotuku (born 1949), a New Zealand academic
- Rona Ngahuia Osborne (born 1974), a New Zealand painter, textile and clothing artist
