= Human trafficking in Fiji =

In 2009, Fiji was a source country for children subjected to trafficking in persons, specifically forced prostitution within the country, as well as a destination country for women from China in forced prostitution. Family members, other Fijian citizens, foreign tourists, and sailors on foreign fishing vessels participated in the commercial sexual exploitation of Fijian children. Staff at smaller, local hotels procured underaged girls and boys for commercial sexual exploitation by foreign guests, while taxi drivers, nightclub employees, and relatives frequently acted as prostitution facilitators. NGO's report caring for child victims of prostitution who claim facilitators took them to private boats anchored offshore near Fiji where they were sexually abused or raped by foreign adult men. Reports indicated that some transnational traffickers were members of Chinese organized crime groups that recruited women from China and arrange for them to enter Fiji on tourist or student visas. After their arrival, brothel owners confiscated their passports and forced the women to engage in prostitution. Some Fijian children whose families follow a traditional practice of sending children to live with and do light work for relatives or families living in cities or near schools became trafficking victims. These children were subjected to involuntary domestic servitude or were coerced to engage in sexual activity in exchange for food, clothing, shelter, or school fees.

In 2009 the Government of Fiji did not fully comply with the minimum standards for the elimination of trafficking; however, it is making significant efforts to do so. During 2009, the Fijian government enacted a comprehensive anti-trafficking law, the Crimes Decree, which defined trafficking as a crime of compelled service which does not necessarily involve crossing a border or otherwise moving a victim, and includes several innovative provisions to protect both adult and child trafficking victims. The government conducted anti-trafficking conferences and training for law enforcement personnel, where high-level officials spoke out strongly against trafficking and committed themselves to fighting this crime in Fiji. It also actively engaged with the media to raise public awareness, and is in the process of developing procedural guidelines for suspected trafficking cases. Fiji had one successful prosecution for human trafficking in November 2010.

The country ratified the 2000 UN TIP Protocol in September 2017.

The U.S. State Department's Office to Monitor and Combat Trafficking in Persons placed the country in "Tier 2" in 2017 and 2023.

In 2023, the Organised Crime Index gave Fiji a score of 5 out of 10 for human trafficking, noting that most of this was organised by groups from outside the country.

== Prosecution (2009) ==
The Government of Fiji increased its anti-trafficking law enforcement efforts during the year. The government was limited in its ability to focus on combating trafficking in persons by an ongoing political and economic crisis. While no trafficking offenders were investigated, arrested, prosecuted, or convicted during the reporting period, the government took some steps to strengthen its capacity for future law enforcement action. On February 1, 2010, the government enacted a new Crimes Decree, which repealed the archaic Penal Code. Comprehensive anti-trafficking provisions in the Crimes Decree fill anti-trafficking gaps in the Immigration Act of 2003 which prohibited transnational human trafficking, but did not differentiate between labor and sex trafficking. The prescribed penalties of up to 25 years’ imprisonment and in some cases fines of over $400,000 under the new Crimes Decree are sufficiently stringent and commensurate with penalties prescribed for other serious crimes, such as rape. A new Sentencing and Penalties Decree designed to bring about more uniform judgments in the courts may ensure that minimum sentences for convicted trafficking offenders are also sufficiently stringent. The Crimes Decree also prohibits actions not previously covered by earlier laws, and prohibits using threats or fraud, or administering drugs to procure prostitution, and holds householders or landlords liable for permitting the defilement of a child under 16 on their premises. Fiji has had one successful prosecution for human trafficking under the Crimes Decree. On November 10, 2010, Kadali Murti was convicted of 1 count of trafficking in persons and 7 counts of obtaining property by deception. He was sentenced on November 17, 2010, to 6 years imprisonment, with a non-parole period of 4 years.

Law enforcement officials began to receive training from the government on the new Crimes Decree, including the new trafficking offenses, in January 2010. A Combined Law Agencies Group (CLAG) continued to meet monthly to address law enforcement issues, including trafficking in persons. There is no evidence of government officials’ complicity in trafficking.

== Protection (2009) ==
The Government of Fiji began to improve its efforts to protect trafficking victims over the last year. Due to severe resource constraints, the government primarily relied on NGOs or international organizations to provide most protective services to victims. The government did not identify any trafficking victims during the year. Law enforcement, immigration, and social service agencies did not develop or use formal procedures to proactively identify victims of trafficking among vulnerable populations with which they had contact, such as women and girls in prostitution and illegal immigrants. The government did not operate any victim care facilities specifically for trafficking victims, but provided limited services to child sex trafficking victims at shelters for child victims of any crime or abuse. Courts granted custody of child victims to the Department of Social Welfare, which operates four homes, with separate facilities for boys and girls. At present, however, both child victims of sexual abuse and accused child offenders are placed in the home for boys.

The government provided no shelter facilities for adult trafficking victims, and it did not refer possible adult trafficking victims to shelters and drop-in centers run by NGOs for assistance. One NGO provided assistance to seven victims of human trafficking. Authorities undertook no investigation into the circumstances of suspected victims of trafficking and deported five Chinese women arrested for engaging in prostitution in August 2009. Anti-trafficking laws include provisions to ensure that sex trafficking victims are not penalized for unlawful acts committed as a direct result of their being trafficked. The new Crimes Decree contains significant protection provisions for children, making it an offense to buy, hire, or otherwise obtain possession of any child under the age of 18 years with the intent that the minor shall at any age be employed or used for the purpose of exploitation, and authorizing the court to divest authority from a parent or guardian over a minor under 21 years if the court believes the parent or guardian is responsible for the seduction, prostitution or unlawful detention of that minor.

== Prevention (2009) ==
The Government of Fiji increased its efforts to raise awareness about trafficking during the year, although it had no national plan of action to address trafficking during the reporting period. The government acted to raise both public and official awareness of trafficking. It developed and provided internal training for police and court personnel on the new Crimes Decree's trafficking provisions. The government worked with the media to raise awareness of trafficking. High-level officials condemned trafficking and announced their commitment to fight this crime during press conferences. Relevant ministries and agencies provided information to media outlets and encouraged them to release news stories on trafficking. The CLAG, the National Coordinating Committee on Children (NCCC), and representatives from various ministries met regularly to discuss legislative and policy issues concerning children, including child sexual abuse which may be linked to trafficking. The new Crimes Decree nullified earlier law, which allowed for sex trafficking victims to be treated as criminals. The Crimes Decree criminalizes those purchasing sex from trafficking victims, whereas the older Penal Code had criminalized only prostituted persons and pimps. In addition, Fiji's new sexual abuse laws have extraterritorial coverage to allow the prosecution of suspected Fijian sex tourists for crimes committed abroad. Anti-trafficking laws apply to Fijians deployed abroad as part of peacekeeping missions, and the Fijian government provided anti-trafficking training for troops prior to their deployment on international peacekeeping missions. Fiji is not a party to the 2000 UN TIP Protocol.
