= Employment Relations Act 2000 =

Statute of the Parliament of New Zealand

Employment Relations Act

New Zealand Parliament
- Long title: No long title
- Commenced: 2 October 2000

Legislative history
- Introduced by: Margaret Wilson, Minister of Labour
- Passed: 2000

Amended by
- 2001, 2004

Related legislation
- Industrial Conciliation and Arbitration Act 1894, Industrial Relations Act 1973, Labour Relations Act 1987, Employment Contracts Act 1991
- Status: Current legislation

The New Zealand Employment Relations Act 2000 (often known by its acronym, ERA) is a statute of the Parliament of New Zealand. It was introduced by Margaret Wilson, the Labour Party then-Minister of Labour under Prime Minister Helen Clark, and commenced on 2 October 2000. Section 6 covers almost all employees in New Zealand, distinguished from independent contractors.

The ERA deals with the duties and obligations of employers and employees, along with breaches thereof. It lists reasons for termination of employment and addresses summary and constructive dismissal, as well as employer bankruptcy. The ERA deals with redundancy, as well as "sham" redundancy and new roles. It also allows employees to pursue personal grievances under six rationales, outlines remedies, and addresses costs of pursuing grievances.

The ERA promotes collective bargaining and requires good faith interactions. It addresses strike actions and lockouts, along with wages, essential industries, strikebreakers, and economic torts during industrial action. The ERA deals with trade union registration, union access and meetings, and addresses the free-rider problem.

The ERA was substantially amended by the Employment Relations (Validation of Union Registration and Other Matters) Amendment Act 2001 and by the ERAA (No 2) 2004, with other amendments in 2008, 2021, and 2026.

== Preceding statutes ==
The original statute governing employment relations in New Zealand was the Industrial Conciliation and Arbitration Act 1894 (ICAA). It remained in force for 80 years from 1894 to 1973.

In 1973, the Third Labour Government brought in the Industrial Relations Act 1973 (IRA).

In 1987, the Fourth Labour Government brought in the Labour Relations Act 1987 (LRA).

In 1991, the Fourth National Government brought in the Employment Contracts Act 1991 (ECA). It was in force from 15 May 1991 to 2 October 2000 when it was repealed by the Fifth Labour Government and replaced with the ERA 2000.

The ICAA and IRA gave the most power to a government agency to force employers and employees to reach an agreement. The ECA gave the most freedom to employers and employees to reach agreement without government intervention. The LRA, the ERA 2000 and the ERAA 2004 lie in the middle of this spectrum.

== Courts and institutions ==
Each Act established a court or institution to settle industrial disputes. The ICAA had the Court of Arbitration. The IRA had the Industrial Court and the Industrial Commission which was replaced in 1977 by Arbitration Court. The LRA had the Labour Court and the Arbitration Commission. The ECA had the Employment Court and the Employment Tribunal. The ERA established the Employment Court, the Employment Relations Authority, and the Mediation Service.

=== Employment Court ===
The judges of the Employment Court are appointed by the Governor-General on the advice of the Attorney-General (section 200). Section 187 of the ERA gives the Employment Court jurisdiction over all matters relating to employment disputes. The Employment Court is a court of record and has equal standing to the High Court of New Zealand.

=== Employment Relations Authority ===
The members of the Employment Relations Authority are appointed by the Governor-General on the advice of the Minister (section 167). Section 157 states that the Employment Relations Authority is an investigative body that examines the facts of the case, as opposed to legal technicalities, in seeking to resolve problems with the parties' employment relationship.

=== Mediation Service ===
Section 144 established the Mediation Service, which was hosted by the Department of Labour until 2012, when the department ceased to exist and the role was transferred to the Labour Group of the newly formed Ministry of Business, Innovation and Employment. Section 164 (b) says that the parties should have tried to solve their problems before going to the Employment Relations Authority.

== Coverage of the ERA ==
Almost all employees in NZ are covered by the ERA (section 6). The ERA covers persons who do any work for payment for an employer under a contract of service. Payment may include commissions, piece rates, salaries, or wages. In 2007 the Employment Relations Authority decided that some Ukrainian sailors, who entered into their employment agreements in Russia and were working on a Russian registered ship in NZ waters for a NZ-based charter were entitled to get the NZ minimum wage while in NZ waters.

However, the armed forces, judges, the NZ SIS, and to some extent the police are not covered. The ERA specifically includes homeworkers, for example, a person who buys material from a provider to make shirts at home and then sells the shirts back to the provider, and persons intending to work, that is, those who have accepted a job offer but not yet started working. It specifically excludes volunteers.

The ERA does not cover the relationship between principal and contractor or between contractor and sub-contractor. When the nature of the employment relationship is in doubt the Employment Court "must consider all relevant matters" pertaining to the nature of the relationship. (section 6(3) a).

=== Employee vs independent contractor ===
Independent contractors are not covered by the ERA. Whether a worker is an independent contractor or an employee can be difficult to determine. In Bryson v Three Foot Six Ltd (2003) & (2005), the Employment Relations Authority decided Bryson was a contractor but the Employment Court and the Supreme Court decided he was an employee.

The Employment Court may consider the following factors when deciding when a person is an employer or a contractor.

- The intention of the parties, that is, the terminology used in their contract.
- Whether one party is able to exercise control over how the other party does the work and to what degree.
- Whether the worker is free to get another person to do part of the work.
- Which party provides the tools or equipment needed to do the job. Hook v JB's Contractors Ltd (2001).
- Whether the alleged contractor hires their own workers or not. Hook
- Which party is assuming the risk of making a profit or a loss. Hook
- The amount of responsibility for management and investment each party has. Hook
- The way in which taxes are paid (or avoided). Employers must deduct PAYE and ACC levies from employees' wages.
- The way in which workers are paid.
- Whether the person is GST registered. If they are, they are likely to be a contractor.
- Whether the work the worker does is fundamental to the organisation.
- The way in which the relationship may be terminated.

The Employment Court also recognises that relationships can change over time. In Excel Corp Ltd v Carmichael (2003), the worker started as a contractor but over time became an employee, whereupon he was covered by the ERA.

== Duties and obligations of employers and employees ==
Section 4 states that the parties must deal with each other in good faith. In Telecom South Ltd v Post Office Union (Inc)(1991) the contract of employment was described as "a special relationship under which workers and employers have mutual obligations of confidence, trust and fair dealing." A contract of employment is not the same as a commercial contract as it resembles a fiduciary relationship in some ways. When the ERA was introduced in 2000 the Government's policy statement stated that it is

... based on the understanding that employment is a human relationship involving issues of mutual trust, confidence and fair dealing, and is not simply a contractual, economic exchange. This basis requires specific recognition of the relationship – something not satisfactorily achieved by general contract law.

=== Duties and obligations of employers ===
Most of the duties and obligations that fall on employers are not found in the ERA but in other statutes or in common law.

==== To pay the worker ====
Section 65(2) of the ERA requires the employer to set out in writing the rate payable to employees. The Minimum Wage Act 1983 sets the minimum wage. The Minimum Wage Act also applies to workers who are being trained, as an Auckland Subway sandwich branch recently discovered when it tried to pay new workers in training $5 an hour. Under the Wages Protection Act 1983 most employers must pay wages in cash unless they have written consent to do otherwise. Employers may only make deductions required or permitted by statute or with the written consent of the employee.

==== To ensure a safe workplace ====
Under the Health and Safety in Employment Act 1992 the employer has a duty to ensure that the workplace is safe for employees, contractors and visitors.

In Williams v Dunedin City Ford (Unreported, Employment Relations Authority, Christchurch, 19 September 2007) the Employment Relations Authority decided that a female worker who had viewed 2 pornographic images at work in three days, and complained about them to her supervisor, had not been provided with a safe and secure workplace "free of avoidable harm", due to the employer's failure to deal with the second pornographic image. The employee was eventually dismissed after being absent from work on long-term sick leave. She was awarded $10,000 for lost salary and $7500 as compensation for distress.

==== To permit employees to take paid leave ====
The Holidays Act 2003 gives employees 11 public holidays, 4 weeks of annual leave, 5 sick days, and 3 days bereavement leave. The Parental Leave and Employment Protection Act 1987 gives employees 14 weeks (though increasing to 16 weeks as of 1 April 2015) of government funded parental (maternity) leave (maximum $504 per week). Employees may also take an additional 38 weeks extended leave for child care. There is a presumption that the job will be kept open for the employee taking leave.

==== Not to discriminate against employees ====
Three pieces of legislation cover discrimination in the workplace. The Equal Pay Act 1972 made different pay rates for men and women doing the same job illegal. The Human Rights Act 1993 made discrimination on 13 grounds illegal. They are : sex, marital status, religious belief, ethical belief, colour, race, ethnic or national origin, disability, age, political opinion, employment status, family status, or sexual orientation. Section 103 of the ERA adds 3 more prohibited grounds to the 13 in the Human Rights Act. They are sexual harassment, racial harassment and discrimination due to union activities.

==== To take responsibility for employees actions ====
Unless employees are knowingly acting unlawfully or deliberately disobeying instructions employers have a common law duty to honour contracts or promises that employees make on their behalf. Employers also have a duty to indemnify employees for losses and reimburse them for reasonable expenses. In October 2005, an Air New Zealand flight attendant lost a $450 gold tie-pin on a flight. 18 months later, the Employment Relations Authority ordered Air NZ to pay for the tie-pin. Employers are also vicariously liable for damages caused by employees in the course of their employment.

==== To provide written employment agreements ====
Section 65 of the ERA states that individual employment agreements must be in writing. An employment agreement must contain:

- The names of the employer and employee.
- A description of the work to be performed.
- An indication of where the employee will work.
- The working hours.
- The wages or salary.
- A plain-language explanation of the services available for sorting out employment relationship problems.
- Notice of the 90-day time limit to raise a personal grievance.

If an employer does not provide a written employment agreement, the maximum fine is $5,000 for an individual or $10,000 for a company.

A good employment agreement should also have clauses covering the term of employment, protection of the employer's confidential information, leave (statutory and non-statutory), redundancy, termination of employment, serious misconduct, suspension, and where applicable, clauses covering probationary periods, targets and bonuses, and restraint of trade.

==== Covert surveillance ====
Covert surveillance of employees by employers does not breach the principle of good faith if it is done in accordance with the law.

Legislation allows employers to use cameras and other methods of surveillance without the knowledge of staff if there was reasonable suspicion that a crime was being committed, if the equipment was used for the specific purpose of investigating that crime and if the equipment is removed immediately after the crime has been solved.

In one case a sales rep was given a company car but wasn't achieving sales targets or satisfactorily accounting for his time so the employer covertly installed a GPS tracking device in his car to monitor his movements, and discovered that most of his days were spent at golf courses around Auckland.

The employee was dismissed and he challenged his sacking by appealing to the Privacy Commissioner, claiming the company had been underhand in installing a GPS device in his car without his knowledge. The commissioner upheld the employer's right to use it since the company had reasonable grounds to suspect that the employee was behaving dishonestly.

=== Duties and obligations of employees ===
Most of the duties and obligations that fall on employees are not found in the ERA but in other statutes or in common law.

==== To work ====
Employees must be ready, willing and able to perform their job as specified in their employment agreements. Employees must have the required skill and necessary qualifications to perform the work. They must give personal service to their employer and not get another person to work in their place. Part 6 of the ERA allows workers to preserve their working conditions if they choose to transfer to a new employer through restructuring.

If an employee doesn't show up for work for 3 or 4 consecutive days and fails to inform his or her employer, then the employer is entitled to conclude that the employee has "abandoned the employment". However, the employer should make an effort to contact the absent employee. Employment agreements often contain an abandonment clause.

==== To obey instructions ====
Employees must obey instructions so long as the instructions are lawful, are not dangerous, and are within the scope of their employment agreement.

===== Dangerous tasks =====
Employees cannot refuse dangerous tasks that are an inherent part of their work. e.g. nurses providing treatment to someone with an infectious disease.

===== Overtime =====
An employment agreement may contain a clause that states an employee must work overtime when requested. If this is the case then a refusal to work overtime is a breach of the employment agreement. If there is no clause regarding overtime, then the 40 hours per week is the maximum set by the Minimum Wage Act. Employment Agreements of salaried employees often contain a clause like this:

The salary/wages for this position cover all time worked in meeting the performance requirements and the employee is not entitled to additional payment for time worked outside the normal hours specified. However, where a significant number of additional hours are worked, the employer will, if possible allow the employee to take time off in compensation for the additional hours worked.

As a result, 20% of New Zealanders work more than 50 hours a week. An OECD study shows that New Zealander's now work some of the longest hours in the Western world – 1826 hours a year, compared with the OECD average of 1778. In response, the Flexible Working Arrangements Act was passed on 21 November 2007. It aims to allow employees who are also caregivers to request more flexible working hours.

===== Serious misconduct =====
Employees can be sacked for serious misconduct. However, in November 2007, the Employment Authority decided that having a shouting match with the boss, which included obscenities and personal abuse, did not amount to serious misconduct, at least when the boss contributes to the dispute. On the other hand, in December 2007, the Employment Relations Authority found that a sports journalist who told his editor to leave "his f...ing copy alone" was fairly dismissed. The rugby league journalist had received warnings about his behaviour before.

==== To take care ====
Under the Health and Safety in Employment Act 1992, employees are also required to ensure a safe working environment. They must also take care not to damage the employer's property and equipment. An employee who damages their employer through deliberate misconduct or negligence may be sued by the employer for compensation.

==== To show fidelity ====
There are many ways in which courts have held that employees have breached this duty. Employees can not :

- Work for their employer's competitors in their own time.
- Use information gained at work for personal gain or disclose the employer's confidential information unless it is an act of whistle blowing.
- Fail to report misconduct by other employees.
- Do anything in their free time to damage the reputation of their employer. Many employees have been fired for committing crimes that were unrelated to their job.
- Try to take away an employer's customers for when they go into business for themselves.

Employers may also try to prevent employees competing with them after the employee has left the company by including restraint of trade provisions in the employment agreement. However these provisions are only enforceable if a court decides they are reasonable in terms of the parties' interests and the public interest. In an unreported case in September 2007, the Employment Relations Authority decided that a clause that prevented a hair stylist from soliciting or dealing with any customers from his old workplace for 3 months after he had left his old workplace, was reasonable. The stylist's new workplace was 50 metres from the old one.

==== Drug testing ====
Employers can unilaterally introduce drug testing in the workplace if it is "reasonable" and the employer should consult with employees before introducing the policy. Two useful cases on drug testing in the NZ workplace are NZ Amalgamated Engineering and Manufacturing Union v Air New Zealand Ltd and MUNZ and Ors v TLNZ and Anor.

In NZAE&MU v AirNZ the Employment Court said that employees engaged in "safety-sensitive" areas, such as flying planes, could be drug tested. In MUNZ and Ors v TLNZ and Anor the Employment Court said the drug testing policy must be "reasonable in all the circumstances".

=== Breach of duties and obligations ===
A serious breach of any one of the duties by the employee allows the employer to fire the employee. A breach of these duties by the employer that causes the employee to resign allows the employee to sue for constructive dismissal.

== Termination of employment ==
Employees can only be fired if the employer has a good reason and has followed a fair procedure.

Good reasons for firing employees include:

- Unsatisfactory performance
- Incompatibility with other employees
- Absenteeism
- Negligence
- Misrepresentation in a curriculum vitae (exaggeration in a CV may not be sufficient)
- Incompetence (where a person says they have a skill but in fact don't)
- Misconduct
- Inability to perform the work due to injury or illness
- Theft (of even low value items e.g. six jars of jam)
- Sleeping on the job
- Violence (even against a co-worker's car or a cow)

In all of these situations the seriousness of the "bad behaviour" is crucial. The termination must also be procedurally fair. A procedure that does not follow the principles of natural justice is unlikely to be held to be fair. The leading case on procedural fairness is NZ Food Processing, IUOW v Unilever.

A dismissal following poor or unfair procedure will not necessary result in the Court finding that the dismissal was unjustified if the conduct was bad enough, but may result in the employee being awarded monetary compensation. Section 103A of the ERA states that the dismissal must be "fair and reasonable" under the circumstances. In 2006 a woman was sacked for forwarding an email containing pictures of naked people but the ERA awarded her $9000 for unjustified dismissal.

(See 7.1 Unjustifiable Dismissal below for further discussion)

=== Summary dismissal ===
A summary dismissal is an immediate dismissal for serious disobedience or serious misconduct. Violence, drunkenness, disobeying reasonable orders, and insubordination on the part of the employee may be grounds for summary dismissal if the conduct is bad enough.

In 2005 Donna Maree Tauhore assaulted a colleague and was dismissed and prosecuted for assault. She was acquitted of assault in the District Court but the Employment Relations Authority rejected her claim of unjustified dismissal saying that based on the information available at the time, the employer's decision to sack her was reasonable.:

=== Constructive dismissal ===
A constructive dismissal results when an employee resigns due to unfair pressure from the employer. In IUOW v Woolworths: three categories of constructive dismissal were set.

- The employee is given a choice between being fired and resigning.
- The employer deliberately breached a duty in order to force the employee to resign.
- The employer breached a duty (not deliberately) which led the employee to resign.

The employee's resignation also needs to be caused by the breach of duty on the part of the employer and the breach has to be serious enough to make it reasonably foreseeable that there was a substantial risk of resignation.

Claims of constructive dismissal are not simple and are relatively difficult to prove in court. Many claims of constructive dismissal arise when an employer changes the working conditions to the employee's disadvantage, e.g. more responsibility but no more pay. The employee quits and then tries to claim constructive dismissal. However, under section 103(1)b of the ERA, the employee is only entitled to pursue a personal grievance claim when "1 or more conditions ... are ... affected to the employee's disadvantage by some unjustified action by the employer".

In a case from April 2006, the Employment Relations Authority awarded a woman $6000 for constructive dismissal when she felt she had no choice but to resign because she could no longer trust her company's managing director, who broke a promise not to disclose her name to a "very unstable" colleague that she had reported for making threats, and because she felt unsafe at the company.

=== Redundancy ===
Sections 69M and 69N of the ERA states that every employment agreement must contain an "employee protection provision" which protects employees in the case of "technical redundancy", that is a redundancy due to the employer selling, transferring or contracting out, all or part of its business. However, workers are usually only entitled to redundancy compensation if it is specified in their employment agreement.

Section 69A of the ERA gives some protection from redundancy in some situations to employees listed in Schedule 1 of the ERA, that is, cleaners, caterers, orderlies and caretakers.

When an "employee is, or will be, no longer required by his or her employer to perform the work, or part of the work, performed by the employee" (section 69C) an employee may be made redundant. Not only does an employer need genuine business reasons for a redundancy, they must follow a fair procedure.

Based on case law, fair procedure includes:

- notification of the restructuring process before decisions are made.
- notification of the criteria used to decide who will be made redundant.
- a discussion with employees of how the restructuring process could affect their positions.
- an opportunity for employees to comment on the restructuring process.
- offering alternative positions within the company.
- a reasonable period before the redundancy takes effect.

If a redundancy was not fair an employee may bring a personal grievance for unjustified dismissal.:

==== "Sham" redundancy ====
As there is no automatic entitlement to redundancy pay in NZ, some employers see redundancy as a way of getting rid of an employee they may not like but whose job performance is not poor enough to justify a dismissal. While employers are allowed to restructure their business to make it more efficient, they may not simply change the job title, offer a lower salary or wage, but leave the job description "substantially similar". This would be a "sham" redundancy. The test for "substantially similar" is:

Would a reasonable person, taking into account the nature, terms and conditions of the new position consider there was sufficient difference between the former role and the alternative role offered by the employer?

Some factors that are compared to determine whether a new role is "substantially similar" to an old one are:

- Level of responsibilities.
- Change in seniority – is this a demotion?
- Changes to salary and other benefits.
- Reduced or increased hours of work.
- Different type of employment, e.g. fixed term instead of permanent.
- Reduced leave entitlements or other benefits.
- Reduced/removed redundancy compensation.
- Recognition of prior service.

==== New role ====
Employers may make a position redundant but offer the employee another role in the company. If the new role is "substantially similar" then the employee is obliged to accept the new role.

=== Employer bankruptcy ===
When an employer goes into bankruptcy the order in which creditors are paid is determined by schedule 7 of the Companies Act 1993 and section 104 of the Insolvency Act 1967. The fees and expenses of the Assignee or Liquidator are paid first. The costs and expenses incurred by the creditor who asked the court to declare the bankruptcy are paid second. Wages, salaries, holiday pay, redundancy, and payments ordered by the Employment Relations Authority or Employment Court, owed to employees are paid third. An employee can only receive a maximum of $15,000. However, when the employee is married to the bankrupt then he or she is paid sixth. Money owed to the IRD for child support, the kiwisaver scheme and the student loan scheme, is also paid third.

†NB the Act itself says "fourth" and "seventh" respectively, but what ever was "third" has been repealed.

== Personal grievance ==
According to section 103 of the ERA, an employee that believes they have been;

1. unjustifiably dismissed;
2. disadvantaged in employment by an unjustified action by the employer;
3. discriminated against;
4. sexually harassed;
5. racially harassed;or
6. subject to duress over union membership;

may pursue a personal grievance under the Employment Relations Act 2000. In addition whistle blowers are protected under the Protected Disclosures Act 2000.

Section 112 of the ERA states that when an employee can choose to bring an action under the ERA or the Human Rights Act 1993 the employee can not bring an action under both acts. Section 114 of the ERA states that a personal grievance must be raised with the employer within 90 days.

=== 1 Unjustifiable dismissal ===
The Personal Grievance provisions of the ERA are now the only way for an employee to challenge a dismissal (section 113). Employees no longer have the right to sue under the common law in the Courts.

There was no definition of "unjustifiably dismissed" in the original ERA but in 2004, section 103A(2): "Test of Justification" which applies to claims for unjustifiable dismissal or unjustifiable disadvantage, was added to the Act:

The question of whether a dismissal or an action was justifiable must be determined, on an objective basis, by considering whether the employer's actions, and how the employer acted, were what a fair and reasonable employer would have done in all the circumstances at the time the dismissal or action occurred.

Section 103A(2) was amended in 2011, with the word 'would' replaced with 'could'. This results in a much more objective approach as to what is fair and reasonable by the employer.

The employer must show that a dismissal was justified substantially and procedurally.

==== Procedural fairness ====
The leading case on procedural fairness is IUOW v Unilever NZ. It says that the employee must be given;

- notice of the specific allegation and its gravity and possible outcome
- an opportunity to refute the allegation (with an opportunity to have a representative, not simply a witness, present)
- unbiased consideration of the employee's explanation.

These are the minimum standards but a more comprehensive procedure may be required depending on the facts of the case. In Trotter v Telecom NZ: the court said that in the case of dismissal for poor work performance:

Warnings for poor work performance should be explicit and fair. They should describe how an employee's behaviour is deemed to be unsatisfactory, give clear information about what improvements will meet the employer's requirements, and how improvement will be measured.

However judges have recognised that most employers will not be able to provide perfectly fair procedures for dismissing employees. In BP Oil v NDU: the Court of Appeal said:

The question is essentially what it was open to a reasonable and fair employer to do in the circumstances.

In IUOW v Unilever NZ the court also said:

...the employer's conduct of the disciplinary processes is not to be put under a microscope and subjected to pedantic scrutiny.

This means that minor procedural inadequacies should not render a disciplinary action unjustified. For a detailed example see Pixie Eruera Morrison v New Zealand Post (discussed in Investigating misconduct : a delicate tea ceremony? see external links). In this case the Employment Court found that NZ Post's investigation was not up to standard but the employee's misconduct was serious enough to justify the employee's dismissal.

However Tony Skelton, managing director and CEO of ACE Training, believes that small to medium-sized employers find it so difficult to comply with the requirements of the ERA 2000 that they pay one to three months salary to underperforming employees to leave rather than dismiss them through the process outlined under the Act.

If we as business owners don't follow the process correctly, irrespective of the reasons and the legitimacy of a disciplinary action, we are in default of the Act and we are going to get done for it. From a small businesses owner's point of view, the business has absolutely no protection whatsoever. It's a completely lopsided, unbalanced piece of legislation. It takes three months to go through the process and, if you slip up on one point, the Employment Court says you've stuffed up.

===== All the circumstances =====
"...all the circumstances" in section 103A could include the size and resources of the organisation. A large organisation with a human resources department could do a better investigation than a small business. A large organisation could also afford to suspend an employee on full pay while the investigation is carried out. The NZ Police suspended Clint Rickards on full pay from February 2004 until November 2007, when Rickards resigned. A small business could not afford to suspend an employee for several years on full pay.

===== Procedurally fair process =====
An example of a procedurally fair process is as follows:

1 The employer conducts a proper investigation into the alleged wrongdoing.

2 The employer invites the employee to a disciplinary meeting. The employee should be told:

- All the information that was uncovered in the investigation.
- To bring any information of their own.
- That he or she can bring a representative or a support person.
- That the outcome of the disciplinary process may be dismissal.

3 At the meeting, the employer should properly explain their information and give the employee a chance to respond to it and present their own information.

4 After the meeting, the employer should properly consider all the information with an open mind and inform the worker of the decision.

===== Probation or trial periods =====
An employer and employee may agree on a probation or trial period but this must be specified in writing in the employment agreement. However the employer can not simply dismiss the employee at the end of the trial period if the employee has not met expectations. An employee on "probation" has all the protection under the ERA that ordinary employees have, that is, an employer needs a good reason and must follow a fair procedure to dismiss a worker (section 67). In response to an employer who wants to sack an underperforming worker on a probationary period, lawyer Lyndal Yaqub of DLA Phillips Fox gives the following advice:

Under The Employment Relations Act probationary periods do not affect the application of the law relating to unjustifiable dismissal. Even if an employee agrees to enter into an employment agreement that is subject to a probationary period or trial period, the employer must ensure that any dismissal is carried out in a procedurally fair manner and is substantively justified.

...In other words you cannot just let the probationary period expire and then give the employee notice. You will leave yourself vulnerable to a personal grievance action based on unjustifiable dismissal if you do not follow a fair process.

...you should ... set up a meeting with the employee and at this meeting tell him precisely where he is under performing and exactly what he needs to do to improve. Allow him to comment on this and encourage him to put forward any concerns he may have about e.g. his role, the way he is being supervised etc. If any further training is required then identify this with the employee at this meeting. At the same time you should make it clear to the employee that his employment is in jeopardy if he does not improve.

This way the employee will become aware that he needs to improve and focus rather than being blissfully unaware that he is under performing. ... You should also extend the probationary period to give the employee an opportunity to improve. If after the extended probationary period the employee has still not improved you have the option of dismissing him.

Steve Punter, managing director of Staff Training Associates, gives the following advice to new employees:

What the new employee needs to know is that, if there is a probationary period, then it must be written in the contract of employment – it cannot be done verbally. Also in the agreement – or in some other document linked to it – has to be what the employer will do if the new person doesn't work out in the new job... the whole process has to be transparent, upfront and documented so the employee knows exactly where they stand. [N]ew starters need to demonstrate they can do the job they have been hired for. Or there could be grounds for dismissal. If someone is having trouble in their new job then they have to tell their employer or manager as soon as possible. People should not be frightened of revealing that they are having difficulty. And the reason for this is that the employer has a legal obligation to do their best for their employee. ... Employers [should] meet their new employee at the end of the first week in the new job and, if there are any issues, then they should be raised as soon as possible – not on the day the employer decides they want to dismiss them. Issues have to be addressed as they become apparent. All staff are entitled to warnings, performance counselling and to have access to advice.

=== 2 Disadvantage in employment ===
Employees, who wish to do something about a reduction in the terms of their employment as a result of an unjustifiable action by their employer, may file a personal grievance for disadvantage under section 103(1)b of the ERA. Usually, employees who are still working for their employer file a personal grievance for disadvantage. Employees who have been fired or who have quit, would file a personal grievance for unjustified dismissal or constructive dismissal, respectively.

Conditions of Employment that are covered by a collective agreement or an individual employment agreement cannot be unilaterally varied in a substantial way by an employer unless there is a clause in the agreement to this effect. Minor variations that do not make the role "substantially different" are permissible.

Therefore, claims of unjustified disadvantage usually arise from conditions of employment that are outside a collective agreement or a contract of employment. Examples are:

- a demotion.
- withdrawal of an offer of promotion. Jarvie v Zebrax
- being given new tasks with a lower rate of pay. Anderson v Advanced Foods NZ
- a broken promise of casual work after a redundancy. Blance v DB Breweries
- withdrawal of a staff discount.
- instructions to work on an unsafe machine.
- a final warning. Alliance Freezing v NZAE etc.

Section 103A, the "Test of Justification" also applies to disadvantage, so the employer must show that their action was justified substantially and procedurally.

=== 3 Discrimination ===
Section 104 states that direct or indirect discrimination against employees on the 13 grounds set out in section 21(1) of the Human Rights Act 1993 is unlawful. Section 105 lists these grounds, namely:

1. Sex
2. Marital status
3. Religious belief
4. Ethical belief
5. Colour
6. Race
7. Ethnic or national origin
8. Disability
9. Age
10. Political opinion
11. Employment status
12. Family status
13. Sexual orientation

Section 104 also adds 2 more prohibited grounds for discrimination to this list and they are:

1. An employee's refusal to do work under section 28A of the Health and Safety in Employment Act 1992
2. An employee's involvement in the activities of a union.

Section 106 states that the "exceptions in relation to discrimination" in the Human Rights Act 1993 also apply to employment. For example, a church is entitled to discriminate against members of a different religion when advertising for a minister.

=== 4 Sexual harassment ===
Section 108 prohibits direct or indirect sexual harassment by an employer where the harassment has a detrimental effect on the employee's employment, job performance, or job satisfaction. Section 117 prohibits sexual harassment by co-workers or customers.

=== 5 Racial harassment ===
Section 109 prohibits racial harassment by an employer where the harassment has a detrimental effect on the employee's employment, job performance, or job satisfaction. Section 117 prohibits racial harassment by co-workers or customers.

=== 6 Duress over union involvement ===
Section 110 prohibits employers from discriminating against employees for their involvement (or non-involvement) in a union or other employee organisation.

=== Remedies ===
The primary remedy when the employee has a personal grievance is reinstatement. (section 125) Other remedies include:

- Reimbursement of lost wages or money.
- Payment for humiliation, loss of dignity, injury to feelings.
- Compensation for any other loss. (section 123 b)

The Employment Relations Authority may also order interim reinstatement pending the hearing of the personal grievance (section 127). If the employee has contributed to the situation that gave rise to the personal grievance then the remedies may be reduced (section 124).

The amount of compensation for humiliation, loss of dignity, injury to feelings, etc. is at the discretion of the Authority and the Court and while there is no set maximum, there are indications that $27,000 is the upper limit. However, most amounts are well below this. Under the old ACC scheme, which was abolished in 1992, the maximum payout for personal injury was also $27,000.

=== Cost of pursuing a personal grievance ===
Employees who are union members can ask the union to help them and legal costs will be low. However, cheap lawyers charge at least $150 per hour and large city firms $300–$450 per hour. It costs at least $200 to get a lawyer to file a notice of grievance, unless a free community lawyer acts on your behalf. Community lawyers can be found by ringing the local citizens advice bureau. A day-long mediation at the Department of Labour costs about $300 in legal fees which is only necessary if the case goes beyond one day before the ERA mediator / court. To file a case with the Employment Relations Authority it costs about $71.56 in legal fees and this includes the first day of court costs. The average payout is between $2000 and $4000 and the successful party usually has their legal fees reimbursed by the losing party. Not surprisingly, 95% of cases do not go past mediation.

== Collective bargaining ==
The ERA acknowledges that there is an "inherent inequality of power in employment relationships" and promotes collective bargaining (Section 3) as a way of evening up the power disparity between employers and employees. It also "recognise(s) the role of unions in promoting their members' collective employment interests". (section 12)

=== Good faith ===
The requirement for parties to deal with each other in good faith is central to the ERA. A detailed explanation of good faith was added to the ERA in 2004 (Section 4). In addition sections 35–37 allow the Minister of Labour to approve codes of good faith "to provide guidance about the application of the duty of good faith in ... relation to collective bargaining".

All parties, that is employers, employees and unions in an employment relationship must act in good faith (section 4,2). Section 32 outlines the minimum things that unions and employers must do when bargaining for a collective agreement. They are:

- Agree on a bargaining process. (The Code of Good Faith lists 19 matters for consideration in Section 2.2 a-s)
- Meet each other.
- Consider and respond to proposals made by each other.
- Recognise the authority of the representative and not try to bargain with the persons the representatives are acting for.
- Provide the other party with (economic) information to support bargaining claims.

Section 33 states that the duty of good faith requires the parties to conclude a collective agreement unless there is a genuine reason, based on reasonable grounds, not to.

The following are classic examples of not bargaining in good faith.

- Surface bargaining is merely going through the motions or bargaining without any real intention of reaching agreement.
- Dilatory tactics is where one party refuses to meet and negotiate at reasonable times and intervals.
- Imposing conditions – attempting to impose unreasonable or onerous conditions on the other party indicate bad faith.
- Unilateral changes in conditions by an employer is a strong indication that the employer is not interested in negotiating.
- Bypassing the representative – an employer that tries to bypass the union and bargain directly with workers or refuses to negotiate with the union is not acting in good faith.
- Not providing information – an employer must, upon request, provide information to a union to enable it to understand and intelligently discuss the issues raised in bargaining.

The penalty for a breach of good faith is $5000 for an individual and $10,000 for a company (section 135). In November 2007 the Employment Relations Authority found that Air NZ had breached its good faith obligations to the Service and Food Workers' Union (SFWU) by sending letters to 269 employees it believed to be members of the SFWU, trying to entice them to leave the union. Air NZ may be fined up to $2.69 million (decision pending).

=== Collective bargaining process ===
Sections 40 to 50 cover the collective bargaining process.

=== Collective agreements ===
The aim of collective bargaining is to make a collective agreement.

== Strikes and lock-outs ==
=== Strikes ===
Section 81 defines a strike very broadly. Almost any act that deviates from normal working practices or breaks an employment agreement is included. Go-slows, black bans on persons or products, work-to-rules, reducing normal output and refusing to do overtime are all strike actions. Media statements by Air NZ pilots in 1991, that Air NZ planes may be not be airworthy were held to be a strike, even though the pilots were working as normal, that is, flying planes they had said may not be "airwothy".

Workers may strike only in relation to bargaining for a new collective agreement (section 86) or "on grounds of health and safety"(section 84). Workers must wait for the old collective agreement to expire before they go on strike. As collective bargaining can only be undertaken by a union, only union members can go on strike. One person cannot go on strike, only a "number of employees" can do so (section 81). Sympathy strikes, Strikes for political purposes, such as human rights in other countries, and General Strikes are all unlawful.

=== Lockouts ===
Section 82 defines lock-outs. A lock-out occurs when an employer suspends or discontinues the normal operation of their business, completely or partially, with the intent to compel employees to accept terms of employment or comply with demands made by the employer.

As with strikes, employers may only lock-out workers in relation to bargaining for a new collective agreement (section 86) or "on grounds of health and safety"(section 84). In contrast with a strike, one worker may be locked out.

=== Wages during industrial action ===
Employers do not have to pay wages to workers taking industrial action, including statutory holiday pay ("other emoluments") (section 87). Employers may also suspend non-striking workers if there is not enough work for them and does not have to pay those workers. (section 88) Employers do not have to pay wages during lock-outs (section 96).

=== Essential industries ===
Strikes and lock-outs in "essential industries" are possible but are subject to stricter notice requirements. Notice must be given at least 3 days in advance for some industries, (Schedule B – to avoid cruelty to animals) and 14 days in advance for others (Schedule A – to avoid inconvenience to humans).

=== Strikebreakers ===
In general employers can not use strikebreakers (sometimes referred to by the pejorative term "scab"). They can however ask other non-striking employees to do the work that the strikers normally do. If there are health and safety issues, then the employer may employ someone especially to do the work of those on strike but the new worker can only perform duties to alleviate the health and safety issues. (section 97)

=== Industrial torts ===
A common example of an industrial tort (or economic tort) is : Workers go on an illegal strike and the company suffers economic damage due to lost production. The company then sues the workers or their union, or both, for compensation. The Employment Court has exclusive jurisdiction to hear claims based on tort law related to strikes, lock-outs, and picketing (section 99&100).

== Unions ==
Section 15 states that The Registrar of Unions, who is an employee of the Department of Labour, must register a society as a union if they apply and meets the criteria set out in section 14. A union can only be deregistered if the union asks for it or the Employment Relations Authority determines that the union no longer meets the criteria in section 14.

=== Union access and meetings ===
Access : Section 20 gives union representatives the right to enter a workplace for purposes related to the employment of its members or to the union's business.

Purposes related to the employment of its members include:

- (a) participating in collective bargaining.
- (b) dealing with health and safety issues.
- (c) monitoring compliance with collective agreements.
- (d) monitoring compliance with other employment related legislation.
- (e) to deal with an individual's terms and conditions of employment (actual or proposed).
- (f) to seek compliance where non-compliance is detected.

Purposes related to the union's business include:

- (a) to discuss union business with union members.
- (b) to seek to recruit employees as union members.
- (c) to provide information about the union to any employee.

Meetings : An employer must also allow union members they employ to attend 2 paid union meetings of 2 hours duration every year. The union must give 14 days notice (section 26).

=== Freeloading ===
A free loader is someone who does not pay any dues or fees to a union yet receives the same benefits that people who have paid fees do. A common example of free loading is where a union negotiates a collective agreement for its members at a workplace and the employer then gives the same conditions to non-members. Historically, labour governments in NZ have solved this problem by legislating for compulsory unionism. National governments in turn legislated for voluntary unionism.

To deal with the freeloading problem, Section 59 of the ERA makes it a breach of good faith for employers to "pass on" terms and conditions that unions have negotiated for their members to non-members if the purpose of doing so is to undermine collective bargaining or collective agreements.

Under section 69, if the union, the employer, and the non-member employees at a work place all agree, then the employer may "pass on" terms and conditions to non-member employees in exchange for those employees paying a bargaining fee to the union that negotiated the agreement. The non-member employees must agree by secret ballot.

== Amendments ==
The Employment Relations Amendment Act 2008 was passed under urgency by the Fifth National Government of New Zealand in December 2008. It allowed small businesses (those employing fewer than 20 staff) to sack employees within 90 days of being hired without those employees being able to take a personal grievance case against the employer. Kate Wilkinson, the Minister of Labour, said that the Act allowed businesses to employ new staff without a concern that they would face time-consuming and costly grievance procedures if the person was not right for the job. The Labour Party said that the Act opened up workers to abuse and reduced their rights.

On 23 November 2021, the Sixth Labour Government passed the COVID-19 Response (Vaccinations) Legislation Act 2021. The bill also amended the Employment Relations Act to give employees paid time-off for getting COVID-19 vaccinations and allow employers to terminate employees who refuse to comply with COVID-19 vaccine mandates.

On 17 February 2026, the Sixth National Government passed legislation amending the Employment Relations Act 2000 to clarify the legal status of contractors, tighten the criteria for employees in the personal grievance process, introduce a remuneration threshold for unjustified dismissal personal grievance claims, and eliminate the 30-day rule extending automatic collective agreement terms to new employees.

== Other statutes related to employment law ==
- Accident Rehabilitation and Compensation Insurance Act 1992
- Accident Insurance (Transitional Provisions) Act 2000
- Disabled Persons Employment Promotion Act 1960
- Equal Pay Act 1972
- Health and Safety in Employment Act 1992
- Holidays Act 2003
- Human Rights Act 1993
- Industry Training Act 1992
- Minimum Wage Act 1983
- Parental Leave and Employment Protection Act 1987
- Privacy Act 1993
- Protected Disclosures Act 2000
- State Sector Act 1988
- Volunteers Employment Protection Act 1973
- Wages Protection Act 1983

== See also ==
- Labour rights in New Zealand

== Sources ==
- Rudman, Richard. New Zealand Employment Law Guide (2006)
- Dessler, Gary. Human Resource Management (1997)
