= Minister of Labour (New Zealand) =

New Zealand minister of the Crown

The Minister of Labour is a former ministerial position in the New Zealand Government, responsible for labour market regulation and workplace health and safety. It was established in 1892 and was replaced with the new position of Minister for Workplace Relations and Safety in 2014.

== Responsibilities ==
A briefing to the incoming Minister of Labour in 2008 describes the portfolio's primary concern as "the effective operation of New Zealand workplaces." The minister held responsibility for employment relations law (including bargaining, mediation and dispute resolution), setting and enforcing minimum standards for health and safety and employment conditions, and managing the government's relationships with sector bodies such as the Council of Trade Unions and Business New Zealand.

The minister was the responsible minister for the Department of Labour, which was established one year before the first appointment was made. On 1 July 2012, the department was merged into the new Ministry of Business, Innovation and Employment.

== History ==
The Minister of Labour was responsible for employment law including industrial dispute resolution. The position and the accompanying government department were created in 1892 soon after a large strike of New Zealand maritime workers and miners in support of an Australian maritime dispute. The first minister, William Pember Reeves, developed the Industrial Conciliation and Arbitration Act 1894 which was intended to enable unions to negotiate with employers on a more-equal basis. The act also established the first national arbitration court, which gradually established an award system setting standards for minimum pay and conditions for different industries.

In 1973, the law was modernised but retained a level of central control. Ministers of labour would personally get involved in dispute resolution with unions. This ended in 1987 when compulsory arbitration was abolished. Successive labour ministers under the Fourth National Government and Fifth Labour Government progressed significant employment law reforms, resulting first in the Employment Contracts Act 1991 and later the Employment Relations Act 2000. National's Bill Birch was responsible for labour market deregulation, reducing the statutory role of unions which Labour's Margaret Wilson reinstated.

After the 2014 general election, the portfolio was disestablished and replaced by the Minister for Workplace Relations and Safety.

== Office-holders ==
The following MPs have held the office of Minister of Labour:

Key

Liberal Reform United Labour National

No.	Name	Portrait	Term of Office		Prime Minister
1	William Pember Reeves		31 May 1892	10 January 1896	Ballance
1	William Pember Reeves		31 May 1892	10 January 1896	Seddon
2	Richard Seddon		10 January 1896	10 June 1906	Seddon
3	William Hall-Jones		21 June 1906	6 August 1906	Hall-Jones
4	John A. Millar		6 August 1906	6 January 1909	Ward
5	Alexander Hogg		6 January 1909	17 June 1909	Ward
(4)	John A. Millar		17 June 1909	28 March 1912	Ward
6	George Laurenson		28 March 1912	10 July 1912	Mackenzie
7	William Massey		10 July 1912	14 May 1920	Massey
8	William Herries		17 May 1920	7 February 1921	Massey
9	George Anderson		1 March 1921	26 November 1928	Massey
9	George Anderson		1 March 1921	26 November 1928	Bell
9	George Anderson		1 March 1921	26 November 1928	Coates
10	Robert Wright		28 November 1928	10 December 1928	Coates
11	Bill Veitch		10 December 1928	28 May 1930	Ward
12	Sydney Smith		28 May 1930	22 September 1931	Forbes
13	Adam Hamilton		22 September 1931	6 December 1935	Forbes
14	Tim Armstrong		6 December 1935	13 December 1938	Savage
15	Paddy Webb		13 December 1938	27 June 1946	Savage
15	Paddy Webb		13 December 1938	27 June 1946	Fraser
16	James O'Brien		27 June 1946	19 December 1946	Fraser
17	Angus McLagan		19 December 1946	12 December 1949	Fraser
18	Bill Sullivan		13 December 1949	13 February 1957	Holland
19	John McAlpine		13 February 1957	12 December 1957	Holland
19	John McAlpine		13 February 1957	12 December 1957	Holyoake
20	Fred Hackett		12 December 1957	12 December 1960	Nash
21	Tom Shand		12 December 1960	11 December 1969	Holyoake
22	Jack Marshall		12 December 1969	7 February 1972	Holyoake
23	David Thomson		7 February 1972	8 December 1972	Marshall
24	Hugh Watt		8 December 1972	10 September 1974	Kirk
25	Arthur Faulkner		10 September 1974	12 December 1975	Rowling
26	Peter Gordon		12 December 1975	13 December 1978	Muldoon
27	Jim Bolger		13 December 1978	26 July 1984	Muldoon
28	Stan Rodger		26 July 1984	8 August 1989	Lange
29	Helen Clark		8 August 1989	2 November 1990	Palmer
29	Helen Clark		8 August 1989	2 November 1990	Moore
30	Bill Birch		2 November 1990	27 March 1993	Bolger
31	Maurice McTigue		27 March 1993	21 December 1993	Bolger
32	Doug Kidd		21 December 1993	16 December 1996	Bolger
33	Max Bradford		16 December 1996	10 December 1999	Bolger
33	Max Bradford		16 December 1996	10 December 1999	Shipley
34	Margaret Wilson		10 December 1999	26 February 2004	Clark
35	Paul Swain		26 February 2004	19 October 2005	Clark
36	Ruth Dyson		19 October 2005	5 November 2007	Clark
37	Trevor Mallard		5 November 2007	19 November 2008	Clark
38	Kate Wilkinson		19 November 2008	6 November 2012	Key
	Chris Finlayson; Acting Minister		6 November 2012	31 January 2013	Key
39	Simon Bridges		31 January 2013	6 October 2014	Key
