= Employment Relations Amendment Act 2026 =

Proposed Act of Parliament in New Zealand

New Zealand Parliament
- Royal assent: 20 February 2026

Legislative history
- Introduced by: Brooke van Velden
- Committee responsible: Education and Workforce
- First reading: 15 July 2025
- Second reading: 10 February 2026
- Third reading: 17 February 2026
- Passed: 17 February 2026
- Status: Current legislation

The Employment Relations Amendment Act 2026 is a New Zealand Act of Parliament which amends the Employment Relations Act 2000 to clarify the legal status of contractors, tighten the criteria for employees in the personal grievance process, introduces a threshold for unjustified dismissal personal grievance claims, and eliminates the 30-day rule extending automatic collective agreement terms to new employees.

== Key provisions ==
=== Contractors ===
The Employment Relations Amendment Act 2026 amends the Employment Relations Act 2000 to specifically exclude specified contractors from the legal meaning of employee. The Act defines contractors as a person who has entered into an arrangement with a second person under which they perform a work for the latter or a third person that is facilitated by the second person. This arrangement is sealed by a written agreement specifying the employment status of the first person. The first person is also not restricted from performing work for any other persons, except while performing work for the second person or a third person facilitated by the second person. The Act specifies that contracts cannot be terminated because the first person declines the work offered to them by the second person that is additional to the work that the first person has agreed to perform.

=== Personal grievance claims ===
The Act also states that the Employment Relations Authority or courts cannot provide remedies or compensation to an employee if they determine that the actions of the employee contributed to the situation that caused the personal grievance and that action amounts to serious misconduct. The Act also outlines the formula for calculating an employee's annual remuneration (ar): ar = (r ÷ d) × 364. Remuneration includes their PAYE income payments and any other benefits arising from the employee share scheme. The Act also states that employees whose annual remuneration meets or exceeds the specified threshold may not pursue personal grievances for unjustified dismissal or unjustified disadvantage. The specified remuneration threshold is set at NZ$200,000 or the amount resulting from the last increase.

=== Collective bargaining obligations ===
Employers are also required to inform their non-union employees about their eligibility for collective agreements and union membership within the first 30 days of employment. The Act also repeals prior provisions of the Employment Relations Act 2000 requiring employers to share new employee information with unions unless the employee objects, the terms and conditions of non-union employees following the first 30 days, and additional obligations for employers during collective bargaining negotiations. The Act also inserts new provisions related to specified contractors and the specified remuneration threshold, the latter of which tightens the criteria for employees eligible for personal grievance remunerations.

== Background ==
On 25 October 2022, the Employment Court of New Zealand Chief Judge Christina Inglis ruled in favour of four Uber drivers seeking a declaration that they were employees rather than contractors. The four drivers were supported by the trade unions First Union and E tū. Uber subsequently appealed the Employment Court's decision at the Court of Appeal, which heard arguments from the plaintiffs in March 2024. On 26 October 2024, the Court of Appeal dismissed Uber's appeal and upheld the Employment Court's ruling that Uber drivers were employees rather than contractors. The opposition New Zealand Labour Party and Green Party of Aotearoa New Zealand also welcomed the Court of Appeal's ruling and urged the National-led coalition government and the Minister for Workplace Relations and Safety Brooke van Velden to halt work on the proposed Employment Relations Bill that would prevent workers classified as contractors from challenging their employment status in the court system.

In July 2025, Uber appealed against the Court of Appeal's ruling at the Supreme Court of New Zealand. On 15 November 2025, the Supreme Court upheld the two lower courts' rulings that Uber drivers were employees rather than contractors. While Uber's general manager for New Zealand Emma Foley expressed disappointment with the decision, former Uber driver and Wellington City Councillor Nureddin Abdurahman welcomed the decision. Aburahman also expressed concern about the Government's proposed Employment Relations Bill and urged politicians to consider the Supreme Court's ruling.

== Legislative history ==
=== Introduction ===
On 17 June 2025, the Minister of Workplace Relations and Safety van Velden confirmed that the Sixth National Government would be introducing legislation to amend the Employment Relations Act 2000 into the New Zealand Parliament. Key provisions include changing the distinction between employment and contracting, overhauling the personal grievance process, and allowing employers and employees to negotiate "beneficial terms and conditions." While BusinessNZ director of advocacy Catherine Beard said the proposed legislation would provide more clarity around contractural work, the Public Service Association national secretary Fleur Fitzsimons and the New Zealand Council of Trade Unions president Richard Wagstaff expressed concern that the proposed law changes would undermine workers' rights, pay and safety. Van Velden had introduced the proposed legislation amid an ongoing appeal by Uber against an Employment Court ruling in 2022 that its drivers were employees rather than contractors.

The bill passed its first reading on 15 July 2025 and was subsequently referred to the Education and Workforce select committee.

=== Select committee stage ===
The Education and Workforce select committee held public submissions on the Employment Relations Amendment bill until 13 August 2025. The committee received 3,587 submissions from interested groups and individuals, with 61 submitters including the Minister for Workplace Relations and Safety Van Velden making oral submissions. While the New Zealand House of Representatives had instructed the committee to report back by 17 November 2025, this was subsequently extended to 24 December 2025. The Ministry of Business, Innovation and Employment (MBIE) and the Office of the Clerk provided advice on the proposed legislation, while the Parliamentary Counsel Office helped to draft the bill.

The select committee recommended several amendments to the bill including clarifying the criteria for contractors and sub-contractors and raising the remuneration threshold for personal grievance claims for unjustified dismissals to NZ$200,000 effective 1 July 2027. The opposition Labour Party opposed the proposed bill on the grounds that it undermined the principle of employment relations, weakened the personal grievance system, disadvantaged vulnerable workers including contractors, and that the new 30-day employment rule weakened the collective bargaining power of workers. Similarly, the Green Party opposed the bill on the grounds that it undermined workers' rights and argued that the new gateway test for contractors clashed with a 2025 Supreme Court ruling dismissing Uber's challenge against Uber drivers' argument that they were employees rather than contractors.

=== Second reading ===
The Employment Relations Bill passed its second reading on 10 February 2026 and was referred to the Committee of the Whole House the following day.

=== Final reading and royal assent ===
On 17 February 2026, the Employment Relations Amendment Bill passed its third reading. It tightened the criteria for personal grievances claims, created a "gateway test" for differentiating between employees and contractors, ended payouts for employees dismissed for "serious misconduct," and eliminated a 30-day rule extending automatic collective agreement terms to new employees. The bill's sponsor Van Velden argued that the new legislation would "maximise business confidence" and accelerate business growth. By contrast, the bill was criticised by opposition parties and trade unions. Labour leader Chris Hipkins said the bill would drive more New Zealanders to emigrate to Australia while Labour MP Camilla Belich said the bill would erode employees' rights. Similarly, E tū union national secretary Rachel Mackintosh and the Green Party's workplace relations spokesperson Teanau Tuiono criticised the bill for favouring corporations and employers over workers.

The bill received royal assent on 20 February 2026. On 19 February 2026, New Zealand First leader Winston Peters said that he could have made changes to the legislation's personal grievance provisions had unions approached him earlier during the legislative process, and criticised them for focusing on lobbying opposition parties. In response, the Public Service Association's national secretary Fleur Fitzsimons criticised Peters for not doing more to make changes to the legislation's personal grievance provisions during the second reading. The Workers First Union's general secretary Dennis Maga countered that his union had met with NZ First leaders eight times since 2024 to raise concerns about the bill prior to its passage into law.
