= 1941 Bay of Plenty by-election =

New Zealand by-election

- 13 December 1941
- Turnout: 7,699 (83.48%)
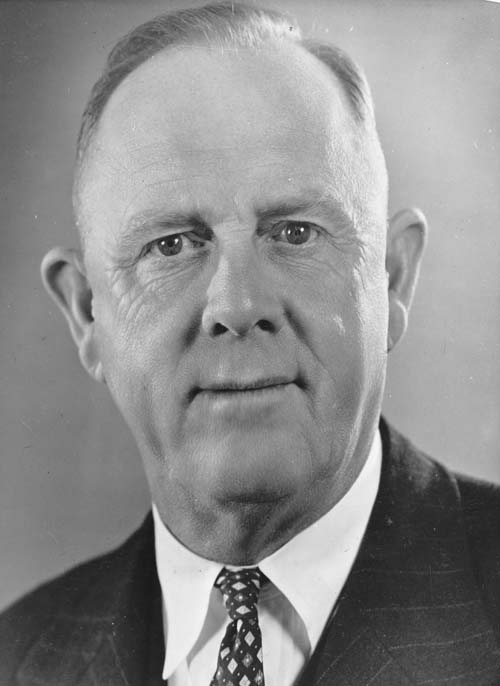

Candidate	Bill Sullivan	Charles Mills
Party	National	Labour
Popular vote	4,675	3,024
Percentage	60.72	39.27
MP before election
Gordon Hultquist
Labour
Elected MP
Bill Sullivan
National

The Bay of Plenty by-election of 1941 was a by-election for the electorate of Bay of Plenty held on 13 December 1941 during the 26th New Zealand Parliament. The by-election resulted from the death of the previous member Gordon Hultquist of the Labour Party who was killed in World War II.

The by-election was won by Bill Sullivan of the National Party; Labour lost a seat.

== Campaign ==
Initially there was speculation that there would be no election necessary and that the National Party would not stand a candidate after the death of an MP on service in wartime (as happened in the Waitemata by-election). This was not to be the case and National stood their candidate from the 1938 election and former Mayor of Whakatane Bill Sullivan.

The Labour Party selected Charles Mills, a baker, as their candidate. He was an elected member of the Poverty Bay Electric Power Board and had been a campaign organiser for Hultquist in Bay of Plenty in both the 1935 and 1938 elections.

The incipient Democratic Labour Party (DLP), who had recently formed a branch in the electorate in Ōpōtiki, also contemplated standing a candidate. However the DLP did not contest the seat.

== Results ==
The following table gives the election results:

1941 Bay of Plenty by-election
Party	Candidate	Votes	%	±%
National	Bill Sullivan	4,675	60.72	+11.91
Labour	Charles Mills	3,024	39.27	
Informal votes		136	1.76	+1.11
Majority		1,651	21.44	
Turnout		7,699	83.48	−9.03
Registered electors		9,222		
