= Bethan Greener =

New Zealand professor of international security

- Born: 19 February 1977
- Other name: Beth Greener-Barcham
- Occupation: international security researcher

Academic background
- Education: University of Canterbury, Australian National University
- Theses: Counter-terrorism: the New Zealand context (2000); Liberalism and the use of force: a means to an end? (2004)
- Doctoral advisor: Lorraine Elliott, Des Ball, Christian Reus-Smit, Paul Keal
- Other advisors: Matthew S. Hirshberg, John Henderson

Bethan Kirstie Greener, also known as Beth Greener-Barcham, is a New Zealand academic, and is a full professor at Massey University, specialising in international security. As of 2024 she is the head of the School of People, Environment and Planning.

== Academic career ==
Greener had been interested in how countries provide security for people since childhood, and says her awareness of events such as the Cold War, the bombing of the Rainbow Warrior and the 1991 Gulf War helped form that interest. She completed a master's in political science at the University of Canterbury in 2000, with a thesis on counter-terrorism in New Zealand. In 2004 she completed her PhD at the Australian National University, with a thesis titled Liberalism and the use of force: a means to an end?. Greener then joined the faculty of Massey University, rising to full professor from 2022.

Greener's research focuses on international security, the role of the military and the police, and attitudes towards women in combat roles. She has worked with the New Zealand Army, the United Nations Police and the United Nations Office of Drugs and Crime. She is part of the Centre for Strategic Studies at Victoria University of Wellington, and as of 2024 is head of school at the New Zealand Institute of International Affairs. She has been part of two Marsden grant teams, including as an associate investigator on the 2008 grant Building sustainable peace in the South Pacific, and served on a Marsden grant assessment panel in 2019.

She has published three books, on international policing, the role of the police and military in peace operations, and an edited study of the New Zealand army. As of 2017 she was working on a book on private security forces.

== Selected works ==
- Greener, B. K. (2009). The New International Policing. London: Palgrave Macmillan UK. ISBN 978-1-349-36491-6.
- Greener, B. K.; Fish, W. (2015). Internal Security and Statebuilding: Aligning Agencies and Functions. Routledge & CRC Press. ISBN 9781138797871.
- Greener, Bethan (2020). "Legitimacy, Compliance and Accountability in International Policing". International Peacekeeping. 27 (5): 859–863. doi:10.1080/13533312.2020.1821367. Wikidata Q123219113.
- Rochelle Stewart‐Withers; Jeremy Hapeta; Greener, Bethan (2021). "'The Game' that stopped two nations: Development and diplomacy in the case of the 2015 New Zealand All Black's and Manu Samoa rugby test match in Samoa". Asia Pacific Viewpoint. 62 (3): 295–312. doi:10.1111/apv.12304. Wikidata Q124094360.
- Greener, Bethan (2011). "Revisiting the politics of post-conflict peacebuilding: reconciling the liberal agenda?". Global Change. 23 (3): 357–368. doi:10.1080/14781158.2011.601855. Wikidata Q124094368.
- Greener, Bethan (2011). "The Rise of Policing in Peace Operations". International Peacekeeping. 18 (2): 183–195. doi:10.1080/13533312.2011.546096. Wikidata Q124094366.
- Greener, Bethan (5 September 2018), The Tripartite Formula and Peacebuilding in the Asia-Pacific, pp. 25–49, doi:10.1007/978-3-319-78595-0_2, Wikidata Q124094363
- Greener, Bethan (2021). "'Man(ne)'s world': explaining the paradoxical nature of attitudes towards women in combat". Critical Military Studies. 9 (3): 306–323. doi:10.1080/23337486.2021.1985756. Wikidata Q124094359.
- Greener, Beth; Powles, Anna (16 July 2014). "NZ must leave trenches if serious about UN role". NZ Herald.
