= Nándor Tánczos =

New Zealand politician (born 1966)

His Worship Nándor Tánczos
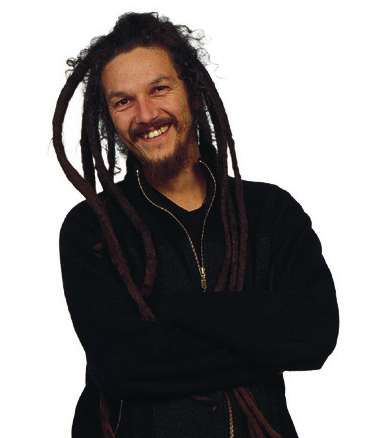
- Nándor Tánczos

11th Mayor of Whakatāne
- Incumbent
- Assumed office 17 October 2025
- Preceded by: Victor Luca
- Majority: 144

Member of the New Zealand Parliament for Green Party list
- In office 14 November 2005 – 26 June 2008
- Preceded by: Rod Donald (Note: Normally, list MPs do not have individual predecessors or successors, but Donald died during a parliamentary term and therefore was succeeded by Tánczos, who later resigned and was succeeded by Norman.)
- Succeeded by: Russel Norman
- In office 27 November 1999 – 17 September 2005

Personal details
- Born: Nándor Steven Tánczos; 29 May 1966 (age 60) Ilford, London, England
- Party: Green Party
- Spouse: Ngahuia Murphy
- Education: University of Waikato

Nándor Steven Tánczos (/ˈnɑːndɔːr ˈtɑːntzɒʃ/, Hungarian: Tánczos Nándor; born 29 May 1966) is a New Zealand politician and activist. He is the mayor of Whakatāne since 2025.

Tánczos was a member of the New Zealand Parliament from 1999 to 2008, and represented the Green Party as a list MP. He is also co-director of He Puna Manawa social and political change agency.

== Early life ==
The younger of two sons, Tánczos was born in King George Hospital, London, and lived in Ilford, Hackney, and Clayhall prior to the family's emigration to New Zealand after Christmas 1973.

Tánczos's Hungarian-born father fled after the suppression of the Hungarian Revolution of 1956; his South African-born mother is Cape Coloured and has Khoi, Dutch, and German ancestry.

The family returned to England, where Tánczos studied journalism at Darlington Polytech. While living in County Durham he got involved in supporting the 1984–85 Miners' Strike by collecting support funds. He later said, “That was the first time I’d ever seen the police used so explicitly as a political force. What I saw in Britain was the police used to destroy a movement.” He also got involved in the anti-nuclear and peace movements, and regularly visited Molesworth Peace Camp.

He attended the Stonehenge Free Festival in 1984 and joined the Peace Convoy the following year. He was at the Battle of the Beanfield and featured in the BBC 2 documentary about those events, 'Trashed'. He returned to New Zealand in 1986.

Tánczos has a Permaculture Design Certificate, a Diploma in Sustainable Land Management from Carrington Polytech, a Bachelor of Social Sciences and a Post Graduate Diploma in Management and Sustainability from Waikato University and a certificate in Te Reo Māori me Ōna Tikanga from Te Whare Wananga o Aotearoa.

== Career ==
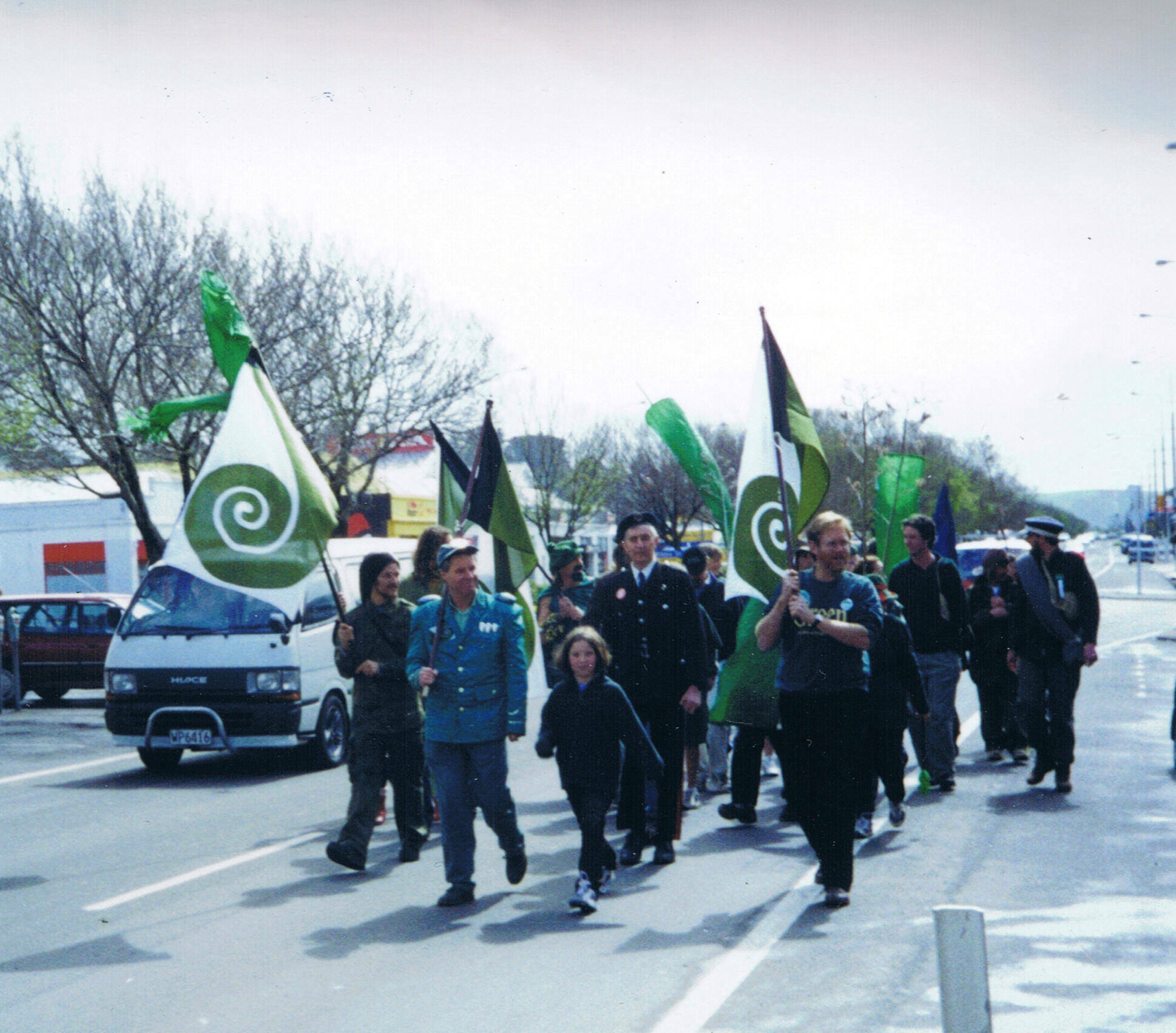
Tánczos (left) with other Green Party members in Oamaru, 2002

First elected in 1999, Tánczos briefly lost his seat in the 2005 General Election, but returned to Parliament following the sudden death of Rod Donald just prior to the first sitting of Parliament, as he was next ranked on the party list. In 2006, he contested the male co-leadership of the Green Party, but was beaten by non-MP Russel Norman in a STV vote by delegates from electorates around the country at the 2006 AGM. In 2008, he resigned from Parliament, though he intended to remain a political activist.

Tánczos was the NZ Green Party spokesperson for the Environment and Sustainable Land Management, Justice, Information and Communication Technology, Constitutional issues, Treaty Issues and Commerce.

The New Zealand media portrayed Tánczos primarily as the voice advocating the liberalisation of the cannabis law in New Zealand, although he also actively campaigned against genetic engineering, and in favour of restorative justice. He also has a reputation as New Zealand's first and only Rastafarian MP. His most significant legislative achievement, the Clean Slate Act, conceals non-violent criminal offences if the offender does not re-offend after seven years. His Misuse of Drugs (Hemp) amendment bill led the way for regulation changes to allow hemp growing in New Zealand. He introduced the Waste Minimisation Bill to parliament with a narrow majority but succeeded in building near unanimous support across parliament. Because of this and other activities such as the Cross Party Accord on Justice that he convened, he built a reputation in Parliament of being able to work collaboratively across party lines. He negotiated the establishment of an Independent Prison Ombudsman, and has advocated for a Criminal Cases Review Office to look at miscarriages of justice, and against unsustainable dairy farming. In addition to his political policies, Tánczos also supports open source software, and uses the Ubuntu Linux-based operating system on his computer.

=== 1999 election ===
New Zealand Parliament
| Years | Term | Electorate | List | Party |
|---|---|---|---|---|
| 1999–2002 | 46th | List | 5 | Green |
| 2002–2005 | 47th | List | 4 | Green |
| 2005–2008 | 48th | List | 7 | Green |

Tánczos first gained election to Parliament in the 1999 election, having held the fifth place on the Green Party's list. His previous involvement with parliamentary politics had involved the Aotearoa Legalise Cannabis Party. In the 2002 election, Tánczos occupied the fourth Green list place, and remained in Parliament. In the 1999, 2002 and 2005 elections, Tánczos also contested the Auckland Central electorate, winning 9.2%, 20.0% and 14.4% of the vote respectively.

=== 2005 election ===
In April 2005 the Green Party announced their list for the 2005 election. Tánczos ranked 7th, moving down 3 places from 2002.

As of election night (17 September) the Green Party polled 5.07% of the vote, qualifying them for 6 seats, which meant that Tánczos stood to lose his parliamentary seat. In both the 1999 and 2002 elections, the number of special votes for the Green party had sufficed to earn them an extra seat once the official count finished. The final total in 2005 (announced on 1 October) fell just short of the number required for a seventh seat, leaving Tánczos out of parliament.

However, on 6 November 2005, the Green Party co-leader Rod Donald died suddenly, a day before the new parliament met for the first time. This allowed Tánczos to return to Parliament as the next candidate on the Green list.

=== Return to grassroots politics ===
Following the death of Rod Donald, Tánczos stood for the leadership of the Green Party but was defeated by Russel Norman. On 17 January 2008 Tánczos announced he would not be standing in the 2008 election. It was initially not clear when he would resign his seat as he intended to see his member's bill, the Waste Minimisation Bill, through Parliament. The bill was due back in the house in March 2008, after passing its first reading with Government support in 2006. He also wanted Russel Norman the Greens co-leader to enter Parliament in his place (because of the advantages in having the co-leader in Parliament in an election year); ex-MP Mike Ward, who was above Norman on the party list, initially declined to stand aside but changed his mind.

Tánczos left Parliament on 26 June 2008, giving a last speech. He commented that his opinions of parliamentarians had changed during his time as an MP, from initially seeing them as a bunch of 'bastards' to recognising that "there are many good people here. The very notion that all politicians are dishonest is misconceived." Expecting politicians to be dishonest and venal is letting them off the hook, he added. He said that he believed most MPs came to Parliament with honest intentions, but not many left with their honesty intact because of how the system itself compromises people. His main point was that in almost every country, governments of whatever flavour are so compromised by corporate agendas that they cannot do what is needed in the face of our environmental crisis. It will be up to people working in community to take control: "When the people lead, the leaders will follow."

Tánczos ended by noting that he had bought a watch for the first time when he entered Parliament and had since been chained to time as a prison rather than an ally. He then took it off and smashed it, saying, "When I look at the state of our rivers, our atmosphere and our communities, I don't need a watch to know what time it is". In 2010, two years after he left politics, Tanczos cut off his dreadlocks as a part of a purification process following his departure from Parliament.

== Whakatāne District Council ==
Tanczos has been one of 5 councillors for the Whakatāne-Ōhope ward of Whakatāne District Council since 2016. He chairs the Strategy and Policy Committee. Excluding sewage emissions, the council has reduced its carbon footprint by 23%.

In 2025, Tánczos was elected Mayor of Whakātane, defeating the incumbent mayor Victor Luca by 144 votes.

== Personal life ==
Tánczos co-founded Hempstore Aotearoa, a business that produces hemp-related products such as cosmetics and clothing.

A Rastafarian, Tánczos has attracted controversy for his admission that he uses cannabis, in accordance with Rastafari ritual. He is, however, a teetotaller. Tánczos has an official exemption from wearing a bike safety-helmet, granted on religious grounds by the New Zealand Police.

He lives in Whakatāne with his wife Ngahuia Murphy, who's from Murupara, and their two children.
