= Bryson v Three Foot Six Ltd =

2005 Supreme Court of New Zealand decision

- Court: Supreme Court of New Zealand
- Full case name: James Bryson v Three Foot Six Limited
- Decided: 16 June 2005
- Citation: [2005] NZSC 34
- Transcript: http://courtsofnz.govt.nz/cases/james-bryson-v-three-foot-six-limited/at_download/fileDecision

Case history
- Prior action: Employment Court [2003] 1 ERNZ 581; Court of Appeal [2004] CA246/03

Court membership
- Judges sitting: Elias CJ, Gault, Keith, Blanchard and Tipping JJ

Case opinions
- Blanchard J

Keywords
- Employment relations, independent contractor, Lord of the Rings

Bryson v Three Foot Six Ltd was a decision of the Supreme Court of New Zealand regarding the real status of a worker as either an employee or an independent contractor. The case concerned whether or not the Employment Court had erred in law by determining that Bryson was an employee of Three Foot Six Ltd. The decision has been made redundant in the film industry by the passage in 2010 of the Employment Relations (Film Production) Amendment Act during the production of The Hobbit.

== Background ==
Bryson, a hobby model-maker for twenty years had worked for Weta Workshops in 1996 and 1997 before working for them again in 1998 and in 2000 to make models for The Lord of the Rings.

In April 2000, Bryson was seconded to a temporary position at Three Foot Six, although after two weeks work he was offered a permanent position as an on set model technician. Bryson was not given any form of written employment agreement when he began work at Three Foot Six.

In October 2000 Three Foot Six gave all crew a written contract which referred throughout to "Contractor" and "Independent Contractor" and Bryson continued to work for Three Foot Six through 2001 before being made redundant at the end of September 2001.

Bryson raised a personal grievance alleging unjustified dismissal, an action that can only be brought if Bryson is found to be an employee and not a contractor.

The matter of whether Bryson was an employee was dealt with as preliminary question. At first instance the Employment Relations Authority (ERA) found Bryson to be a contractor but when the matter was heard de novo in the Employment Court in 2003 Judge Shaw decided Bryson was an employee. On appeal by Three Foot Six, a majority of the Court of Appeal overturned the Employment Court decision and restored the decision of the ERA.

Bryson took the matter to the Supreme Court on appeal.

== Judgment ==
Justice Blanchard delivered the Supreme Court's unanimous decision allowing Bryson's appeal and restoring the decision of the Employment Court.

The key issue in this case concerned sections 6(2) and 6(3) of the Employment Relations Act which stated,

(2) In deciding for the purposes of subsection (1)(a) whether a person is employed by another person under a contract of service, the Court or the Authority (as the case may be) must determine the real nature of the relationship between them.

(3) For the purposes of subsection (2), the Court or the Authority— (a) must consider all relevant matters, including any matters that indicate the intention of the persons; and

(b) is not to treat as a determining matter any statement by the persons that describes the nature of their relationship.

The majority of the Court of Appeal had overturned the Employment Court judgment on the basis that it contained an error of law. Judge Shaw, the majority had held,

was said to have ascertained the real nature of the arrangement by the three traditional tests which, the majority judgment said, left little scope for significant weight to be placed on contractual intention. The Judge had downplayed this. The majority was also critical of the way in which she had seen the industry context as having limited significance. Her approach in effect involved “a claim to require the restructuring of the way in which the film industry operates.”

During the hearing Justices of the Supreme Court had raised issue with counsel that the Court of Appeal may have been incorrect in concluding that Judge Shaw's decision, "contained any error of law which could appropriately have been the subject of appeal to that Court".

Counsel for Three Foot Six responded to the Supreme Court by stating that there were five errors of law in the Employment Court judgment.

Firstly, Judge Shaw was said to have "erred in saying that s 6 changed the tests for determining what constitutes a contract of service". Justice Blanchard retorted that, "We are unable to find in her judgment anything concerning s 6 which does not appear faithfully to reflect the words of the section."

The Supreme Court ruled that "all relevant matters" referred to in section 6 of the Employment Relations Act includes,

- Written and oral terms of the contract between the parties;
- Consideration of the way in parties have actually behaved in implementing their contract;
- Having regard to features of control and integration and to whether the contracted person has been effectively working on his or her own account (the fundamental test), which were important determinants of the relationship at common law;
- Industry practice.

Secondly, it was alleged Judge Shaw had "fell into error in saying that the real nature of the relationship could be ascertained by analysing the tests that have been historically applied such as control, integration, and the “fundamental” test." Justice Blanchard disagreed, "She correctly used them, in conjunction with the other relevant matters to which she referred, in an endeavour to determine the real nature of the relationship, as directed by s 6(2)."

Thirdly, it was alleged Judge Shaw, "disregarded industry practice". Again Justice Blanchard failed to find that this was the case,

The question for this Court is whether the Court of Appeal majority was correct in holding that what the Judge said in relation to industry practice amounted to legal error. We do not believe that it was. She did not overlook or ignore the evidence of industry practice.

Three Foot Six's fourth argument, that Judge Shaw was wrong to say there was no evidence of Bryson acting as a separate business entity when tax invoices existed, was swatted down by Justice Blanchard who reasoned that, "She plainly, and in our view correctly, felt that it did not provide any support for the respondent’s case".

The last submission of counsel was, "that no reasonable Judge could have reached the same overall conclusion as Judge Shaw in finding that the relationship between the parties was of employment by Mr Bryson under a contract of service." Justice Blanchard, failed to find merit in this line of attack, as the evidence as a whole did leave it open to Judge Shaw to find that the real nature of the relationship between Bryson and Three Foot Six was one of employment.

Therefore, as the Employment Court decision contained no error of law, the Court of Appeal had not been empowered by the Employment Relations Act to allow it to be challenged, let alone overturned.

== Aftermath ==
On 29 October 2010 the New Zealand Parliament passed the Employment Relations (Film Production) Amendment Act under urgency after pressure from the makers of The Hobbit. The law changed the definition of employee in section 6 of the Employment Relations Act to exclude all workers involved in the film production industry.
