= Waterfront Control Commission =

The Waterfront Control Commission was a body set up during the Second World War by the New Zealand government to run the wharves, which were vital to the war effort. The commission had the power to control loading and unloading of ships, to organise the work so that a better despatch was obtained, and to ensure reasonable conditions of employment and payment for waterside workers. The Waterfront Control Commission later became the Waterfront Industry Commission. The Commission effectively employed all waterside workers throughout New Zealand prior to its abolition in 1989 as part of the reforms of the Fourth Labour Government of New Zealand.

The commission was established by the Waterfront Control Commission Emergency Regulations 1940, and abolished by the Waterfront Industry Reform Act 1989.
