= Protected Disclosures Act 2000 =

Act of Parliament in New Zealand

New Zealand Parliament
- Long title: The purpose of this Act is to promote the public interest— (a) by facilitating the disclosure and investigation of matters of serious wrongdoing in or by an organisation; and (b) by protecting employees who, in accordance with this Act, make disclosures of information about serious wrongdoing in or by an organisation.
- Royal assent: 3 April 2000
- Commenced: 1 January 2001
- Administered by: State Services Commission
- Status: Current legislation

The Protected Disclosures Act 2000 is a piece of New Zealand legislation regarding the disclosures, in the public interest, of serious wrongdoing (sometimes called 'whistle-blowing'). The Act promotes the public interest by setting out procedures to be followed when making a disclosure, and provides protection to employees who make disclosures, in accordance with the Act.
