= Jock Barnes =

New Zealand trade unionist

Harold "Jock" Barnes (17 July 1907 – 31 May 2000) was a New Zealand trade unionist and syndicalist, leader of the Waterside Workers Union from 1944 to 1952. He was heavily involved in the 1951 New Zealand waterfront dispute. His memoir Never a White Flag was published in 1998.

== Biography ==
Barnes was born in Auckland to parents who had emigrated from Cumberland in England. They lived in Grey Lynn, and when he was four they moved to Mount Albert. He went to Point Chevalier then Edendale schools, and to Auckland Grammar School in 1921. Next year at 15 he became a foundation pupil at Mount Albert Grammar School. He left school in 1925 and joined the Lands and Survey Department as a draughting cadet. He married Freda Jacobs in 1928. Because of his political activities he was “transferred” to the New Plymouth office of the department in 1932, and on refusing to go was dismissed, which he appealed to the Supreme Court and to the Labour Party.

In 1933 he obtained a waterfront job at the Chelsea Sugar Refinery, but was dismissed for refusing to load two Matson Line ships, the Mariposa and Monterey, which had been declared black by American longshoremen. In 1935 he was accepted by the Auckland branch of the Waterside Workers’ Union. In 1944 he was elected national president of the union.

Blacklisted from the waterfront and other jobs after the 1951 dispute, he worked as a drainlayer's labourer. After obtaining a drainlayer's ticket he went into business for himself with his son Bill, retiring in 1980 at the age of 73. He was president of the Master Drainlayers Association for 14 years, and a representative on the Plumbers, Gasfitters and Drainlayers Board.
