= Toby Hill =

Scottish trade unionist

- Born: 5 November 1915; Blantyre, South Lanarkshire, Scotland
- Died: 22 January 1977 (aged 61)
- Occupation: trade unionist
- Known for: 1951 New Zealand waterfront dispute

Toby Hill (5 November 1915 – 22 January 1977) was a Scottish trade unionist and watersider.

Hill was born in Blantyre, South Lanarkshire, Scotland on 5 November 1915. He was heavily involved in the 1951 New Zealand waterfront dispute. He stood unsuccessfully on the Labour ticket for both the Wellington City Council and Wellington Harbour Board in 1944.
