= Gordon Hultquist =

New Zealand politician

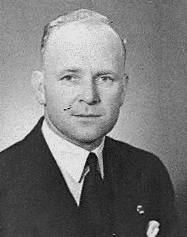

Member of the New Zealand Parliament for Bay of Plenty
- In office 28 November 1935 – 1 November 1941 †
- Preceded by: Kenneth Williams
- Succeeded by: Bill Sullivan

Personal details
- Born: 1904 Bunbury, WA, Australia
- Died: 1 November 1941 (aged 36-37) Egypt
- Cause of death: Influenza

Military service
- Branch/service: New Zealand Army
- Years of service: 1939–1941
- Rank: Lieutenant
- Battles/wars: World War II

Axel Gordon Hultquist (1904 – 1 November 1941) was a New Zealand politician of the Labour Party.

== Early life ==
Hultquist was born in Bunbury, Western Australia, an electrician and the son of a Swedish Salvation Army Officer. He emigrated to New Zealand 1907 with his parents. He received education in Hamilton and later Auckland before becoming an apprentice electrician in Christchurch. There he was involved in union work and was an organiser for Dan Sullivan MP for Avon. He moved back to Auckland in 1925 where he became a foreman with Allum Electrical Company. He was a member of the executive of the Auckland Electrical Workers Union and Grey Lynn Debating Society.

== Political career ==
New Zealand Parliament
Years	Term	Electorate	Party
1935–1938	25th	Bay of Plenty	Labour
1938–1941	26th	Bay of Plenty	Labour

Hultquist was on John A. Lee's campaign committee in Grey Lynn in 1931. In 1933 he stood unsuccessfully for the Auckland City Council on a Labour Party ticket.

He represented the Bay of Plenty electorate from the 1935 general election to 1941 when he died.

== World War II ==
A territorial soldier, he volunteered on the outbreak of war in 1939. He enlisted in the New Zealand Army, and took part in the campaigns in Greece and Crete. He was a Lieutenant in the Signals Corps when he died in Egypt from influenza.

New Zealand Parliament
Preceded by Kenneth Williams	Member of Parliament for Bay of Plenty; 1935–1941	Succeeded by Bill Sullivan
