= Ngahuia Murphy =

New Zealand researcher and author

Ngahuia Murphy is a New Zealand researcher and author. Murphy has written and published books focusing on Māori cultural practises and knowledge surrounding menstruation and was a recipient of the Health Research Council New Zealand postdoctoral fellowship.

== Academic career ==
Completing her Masters at Waikato University, Murphy's thesis focused on traditional menstruation practices, stories, and ceremonies in Māori society prior to European colonization. Murphy stressed the importance of this research, writing that the thesis aimed to challenge the framing of menstruation "within deeply misogynist, colonial ideologies in some ethnographic accounts, distorting menstrual rites and practices beyond recognition", and linking menstruation in Māori communities to the concepts atua and whakapapa. Murphy's doctoral thesis was completed in 2019.

Murphy has likewise published books on menstruation, including Waiwhero: Red Waters: A Celebration of Womanhood He Whakahirahiratanga o te Ira Wahine - a Māori health resource. Murphy told Stuff News that the books were about "reclaiming our ancient teachings that empower Māori women and the whole whanau".

== Personal life ==
Murphy was born in Murupara and is of Ngāti Manawa, Ngāti Ruapani ki Waikaremoana, Tūhoe, Ngāti Kahungunu, and Te Arawa descent. She is married to former Member of Parliament Nándor Tánczos, her partner since 2000. Together they have two children.

== Publications ==
- Murphy, Ngāhuia; Ellison, Sean; Balzer, Regan (2014). Waiwhero : he whakahirahiratanga o te ira wahine [The red waters : a celebration of womanhood]. Ngaruawahia. ISBN 978-0-473-25866-5. OCLC 880986463.
- Ngahuia Murphy (2013). Te Awa Atua - Menstruation In The Pre-Colonial World. Ngaruawahia, N.Z.: He Puna Manawa Ltd. ISBN 978-0-473-25966-2. OCLC 868887553.
