= Huntly rail bridge bombing =

1951 bombing in New Zealand

- Part of 1951 New Zealand waterfront dispute
- Location: 37.5744262°S 175.1055603°E; Glen Afton (or Awaroa) Branch, near Huntly, New Zealand
- Date: 30 April 1951; 3:00am (NZT)
- Attack type: Bombing
- Deaths: None
- Injuries: None
- Perpetrator: Unknown

The Huntly rail bridge bombing occurred on the Glen Afton (or Awaroa) Branch, near Huntly, New Zealand, around 3 a.m. on 30 April 1951, when high explosives were set off on a railway bridge. The bombing took place amid the 1951 New Zealand waterfront dispute, an industrial dispute over the working conditions and wages of dockworkers. Characterised by the-then Prime Minister Sidney Holland as an act of terrorism, the bombing caused no casualties, even though a morning passenger train ran over the weakened bridge. The perpetrators remain unknown.

== Waikato coalfields ==
Coal was first mined from the Waikato coalfields west of Huntly in 1849. By 1951, both pit (underground) and open-cast (surface) mining techniques were being used.

== Trade unions ==
Depending on the mine and mining techniques used, the 1500 Waikato miners were members of either the larger national United Mineworkers' Union, who worked the pit mines, or the smaller local Northern Miners' Union who worked some of the open-cast mines. Small disputes during 1950 had revealed different attitudes both between and within the union memberships.

== 1951 waterfront dispute ==
On 13 February 1951, the national executive of the New Zealand Waterside Workers’ Union decided its members would only work a 40-hour week, and imposed an overtime ban. In response, the employers stood the men down until the following Saturday. By 21 February, the Government had passed emergency regulations and declared a state of national emergency. By 27 February, most of the Waikato miners were on strike, in support of the watersiders, and members of various unions refusing to work brought mining at most Waikato mines to a standstill.

== Coal shortage ==
By the start of March 1951, Waikato dairy companies dependent on local coal were reporting they had a week to ten days supply left. Initially, the Auckland Gas Company expected it would be able to maintain gas supplies. Yet by 12 March, the company said it could only maintain gas supplies for three meal periods a day for 17 days after receiving a fresh shipment of coal, while half the retort house workers were dismissed after they refused duty and walked out. Even though the Waikato open-cast miners returned to work at the beginning of April 1951, this came too late for the freighter Lochybank, which had been in Auckland port since 18 February, and had to load 150 tons of firewood instead of unobtainable bunker coal so that it could sail for Lyttelton to discharge its remaining cargo.

== Bombing and result ==
In 1951, during the New Zealand waterfront dispute and strike, six sticks of gelignite were detonated on a railway bridge near Mahuta, at the Rotowaro end of the Glen Afton branch line, three miles from Huntly. While the bridge was severely damaged, the explosives had been set against the grain of the bridge's hardwood timbers in half-inch diameter holes, causing bridge piles and stringers to be dislodged and splintered, they remained intact. Had the explosives been set with the grain, the bridge might have been demolished. Although residents as far away as Huntly heard an explosion about 3 a.m. on 30 April, and some men boarding the 7:30 a.m. train from Huntly to the coal fields were talking about the explosions they had heard, overnight, the train crew were not aware the bridge had been damaged before the train rounded a bend in the track and the driver saw warning sleepers laid on the track. Although he immediately applied the brakes and slowed the train, the locomotive struck the sleepers and crossed the bridge, which rocked noticeably, along with the leading three waggons, before coming to rest with the guard's van, which was in front of the passenger carriages, on the bridge. The train crew inspected the bridge and saw it had been damaged by explosives, only then realizing it was the result of the early-morning explosion. As they considered that most of the train's weight had already crossed the bridge safely, the crew decided to continue, but stopped and inspected the remaining bridges, before crossing them.

Since the branch line connected the four open-cast mines and several pits in the Waikato coalfields with the Huntly township and the railway line, newspapers initially reported the railway line had been cut. While the government's position was that the attempted sabotage of the bridge was intended to disrupt coal supplies, local police suggested it was more likely an attempt to frighten and intimidate open-cast mine workers.

Although police made extensive inquiries in the area, noting that high explosives were used in the mines, and elsewhere, so would not be hard to obtain, with many people keeping plugs of gelignite at home for various purposes, no arrests were reported. Trains were reported as running normally but with railway employees patrolling the line before each train. The bridge sabotage was thought to have been carried out by coal miners operating without the knowledge or support of the trade unions involved in the industrial actions.

While reporting restrictions in place at the time might have constrained New Zealand reporting, Australian newspapers were under no such restrictions. Many Australian news papers carried a 30 April report about the passenger train crossing the bridge about four hours after the explosion of six dynamite shots had damaged the piles and stringers of the bridge. Also reporting the explosion had failed to destroy the bridge because the charges were laid against the grain of the wood. Speculation about who might have committed the deed were many and varied. While many Australian newspapers were happy to watch from afar, more in depth and independent journalistic investigation was limited. At least one later author speculated that the charges were carefully misplaced with the intention only of warning open-cast miners who were working.

== Reaction ==
Upon hearing the news, Prime Minister Sidney Holland denounced the bombing, calling it an "infamous act of terrorism", as well as a "diabolical act of sabotage" and part of "a desperate cold war". Holland announced an investigation, but the identities of the perpetrators were never discovered. The next day, 1 May, when calling for volunteers to register for the newly formed Civil Emergency Organisation, which was being set up to protecting life and property, he described the bridge sabotage as a tactic "to stop urgently-needed coal from reaching the people’s fireplaces." And said "... it was miraculous that the attempt was not accompanied by serious loss of life ..."

The then Leader of the Opposition, Labour's Walter Nash also condemned the sabotage and called on law-abiding citizens to co-operate with authorities to apprehend the perpetrators and prevent further acts.

A leader of the striking miners "knew nothing" about the sabotage attempt, and appealed for "all miners to refrain from provocative acts." The local police sergeant was "shocked and disappointed" by the sabotage and the open-cast mine-workers thought it a senseless act.

Historians opinions are also varied. Richardson, in his history of the United Mineworkers Union, accepts the police assessment that the sabotage was an attempt intimidate the open-cast miners and that Holland exploited the opportunity the event presented to announce the formation of the Civil Emergency Organisation. Beath, writing in Te Ara, however, argues that the act was one of sabotage, rather than terrorism, and the probable target was property and the intention was the disruption of supplies, rather than achieving a political aim through terror.

== Aftermath ==
In an evening radio broadcast on 1 May, Prime Minister Holland announced that the government had decided to form the "Civil Emergency Organisation" to assist the police and called for male volunteers to register with their local city, borough, or county council, or town board from 10 a.m. the following morning. Even before Holland's broadcast had ended, local mayors were receiving telephone calls from volunteers. By 3 May, over 12,000 volunteers were estimated to have registered. The organisation ceased operation at the end of the waterfront dispute.

== See also ==
- Bridges in New Zealand
- History of New Zealand
- Terrorism in New Zealand
