= Industrial Conciliation and Arbitration Act 1894 =

Act of Parliament in New Zealand

Industrial Conciliation and Arbitration Act

New Zealand Parliament

Legislative history
- Introduced by: William Pember Reeves
- Passed: 1894

Amended by
- 1936, 1961

Related legislation
- Industrial Relations Act 1973, Labour Relations Act 1987, Employment Contracts Act 1991, Employment Relations Act 2000
- Status: Repealed

The Industrial Conciliation and Arbitration Act 1894 was a piece of industrial relations legislation passed by the Parliament of New Zealand in 1894. Enacted by the Liberal Government of New Zealand, it was the world's first compulsory system of state arbitration. It gave legal recognition to unions and enabled them to take disputes to a Conciliation Board, consisting of members elected by employers and workers.

If the Board's decision was unsatisfactory to either side, an appeal could be made to the Arbitration Court, consisting of a Supreme Court judge and two assessors, one elected by employers' associations and another by unions.

The 1966 Encyclopaedia of New Zealand stated: "After some 70 years of operation, the industrial conciliation and arbitration system has become a firmly accepted – perhaps even a traditional – way of determining minimum wage rates and handling industrial disputes. It has been subject to many criticisms from time to time, and occasionally to heavier sectional attacks, but no suggestion for its abolition has ever succeeded in gaining any significant measure of support from the employers' and workers' organisations... or from the community generally." The Act remained in force until 1973, but the essential structure that it established lasted until the Fourth National Government introduced the Employment Contracts Act 1991.

== Terms ==
Registration of unions under the Act was voluntary, and unions could choose to remain outside the Act and negotiate directly with employers. If a union registered, it was bound to comply with the rulings of the Arbitration Court and could not, for example, strike against terms laid down by it. As a result, in the early 20th century, some militant and/or strong unions chose not to register. However most unions and their members benefitted from the Act, as few had the power to negotiate terms that were better than those laid down by the Court. The Act forbade the registration of unions if one already existed in the same industry and area. That prevented competition among unions. The Court could also both make 'awards' that bound all employers and workers in a particular industry and set down minimum conditions and rates of pay, but organisations not party to the original award could apply for a complete or partial exemption from the award.

== 1936 amendment ==
The First Labour Government's 1936 amendment had two major provisions: the 40-hour week and compulsory unionism. Awards could not require more than 40 hours work a week except for overtime, which was to be arranged, if possible, so that no part of the working week fell on a Saturday. Exemptions could be made if a 40-hour week was impractical, which rarely occurred. The amendment also made it illegal to employ a worker who was not a member of a union bound by the relevant award or agreement for that industry. It also restored the power of the Arbitration Court and required the court to factor in the needs of wives and dependent children of workers when making general wage orders.

== 1961 amendment ==
The 1961 amendment, passed by the Second National Government abolished compulsory unionism unless unions and employers agreed otherwise or if 50% of relevant workers voted for compulsory unionism in their industry. Even without compulsory union membership, since employers were still required to prefer union members if they were equally qualified to non-union workers, the amendment had little practical impact.
