= International Peacekeeping =

- Discipline: International relations
- Language: English
- Edited by: Nina Wilén

Publication details
- History: 1994–present
- Publisher: Taylor & Francis Ltd. (United Kingdom)
- Frequency: 5/year

Standard abbreviations
- ISO 4: Int. Peacekeep.

Indexing
- ISSN: 1353-3312 (print); 1743-906X (web)

Links
- Journal homepage

International Peacekeeping is a peer-reviewed academic journal that publishes articles relating to peacekeeping and peace operations.

== Abstracting and indexing ==
The journal is abstracted or indexed in several scholarly databases, including: Academic Search, America: History and Life, Historical Abstracts, SocINDEX, Scopus, PubMed, PAIS International, and Political Science Complete.
