= Tertiary Education Union =

Education trade union in New Zealand

- New Zealand Tertiary Education Union
- Te Hautū Kahurangi o Aotearoa
- Founded: 2009
- Headquarters: Wellington, New Zealand
- Location: New Zealand
- Affiliations: NZCTU
- Website: teu.ac.nz

The New Zealand Tertiary Education Union (Māori: Te Hautū Kahurangi o Aotearoa) is the main trade union in the New Zealand tertiary education sector, with over 10,000 members employed within the sector across New Zealand. Its membership includes academics, researchers, teachers and workers employed in all occupations in universities, polytechnics, institutes of technology, wānanga, other tertiary education providers and allied organisations.

== History ==
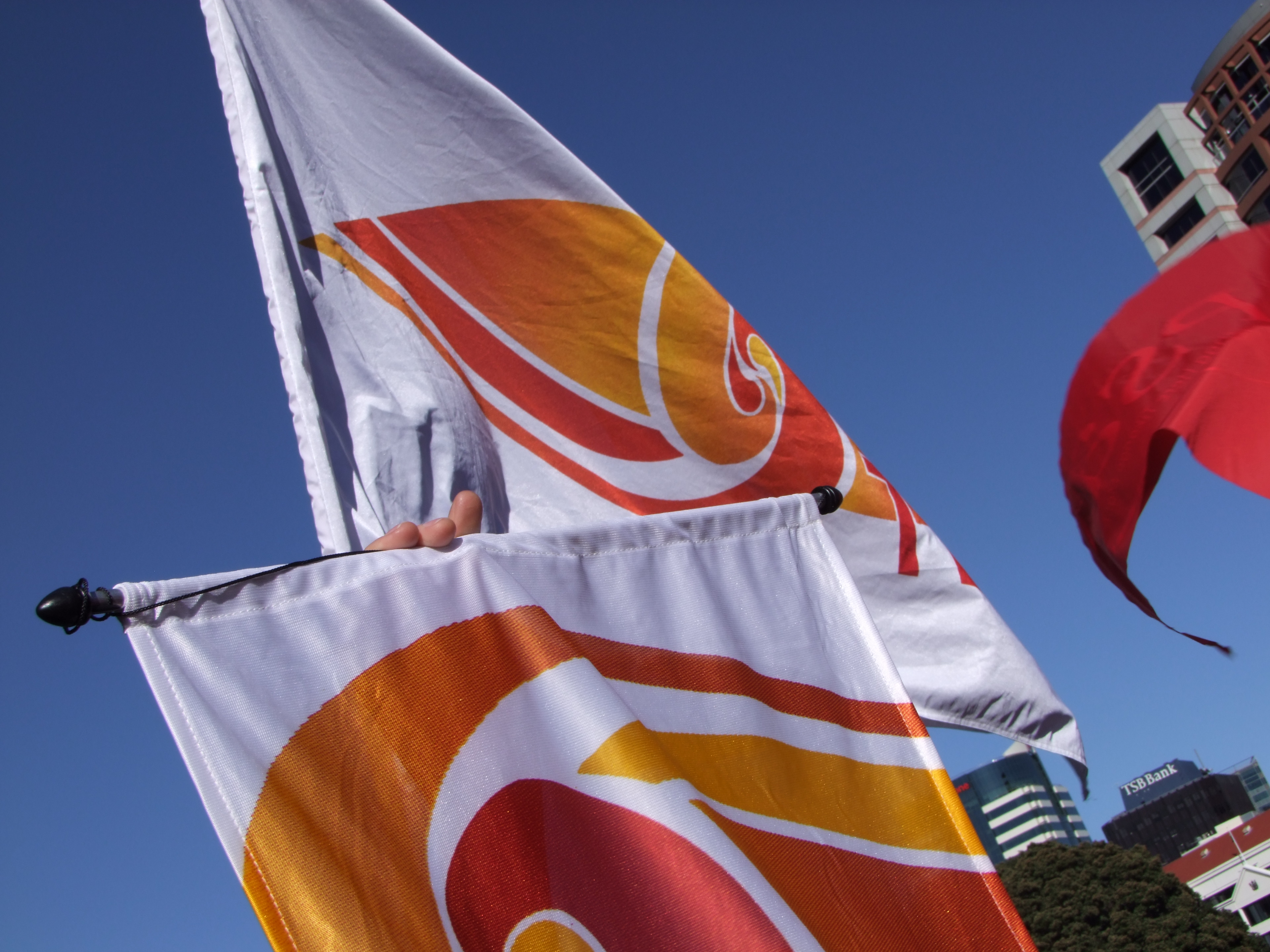
TEU flags at a rally in 2011

Founded in 2009, the TEU was established a result of the amalgamation of the Association of University Staff of New Zealand (AUS) and the Association of Staff in Tertiary Education (ASTE). The Tertiary Institutions Allied Staff Association (TIASA) voted not to amalgamate and remain independent.

TEU is a registered trade union in accordance with the Employment Relations Act 2000. The TEU is a democratic union with strong membership participation and is governed by an elected council. Policy is determined by an annual conference and implemented by a number of committees.

== Campaigns ==
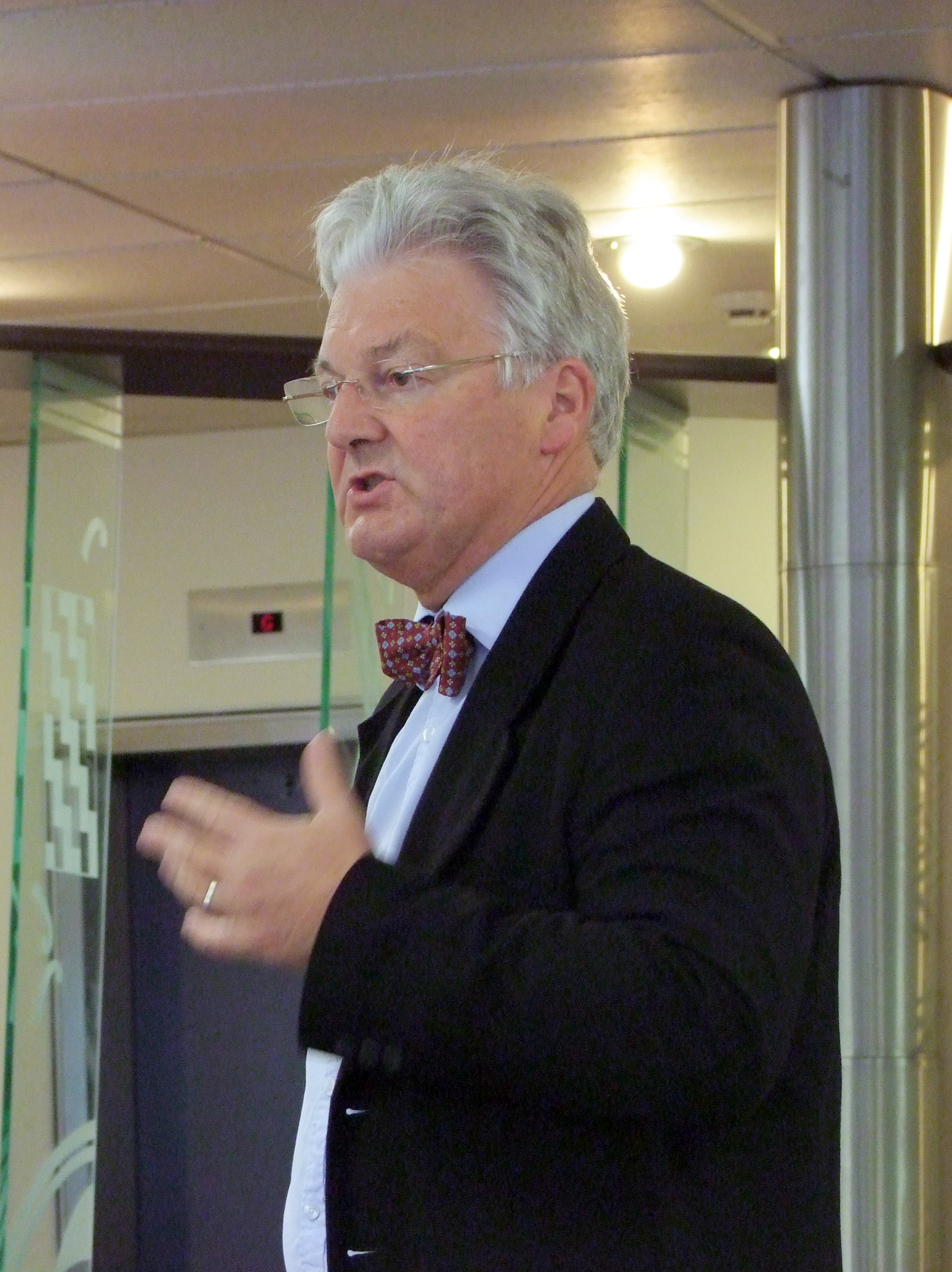
MP Peter Dunne speaking at a TEU-organised Parental leave event

As well as negotiating typical labour rights and employment issues with employers (salary levels, hours of work, etc.) the TEU has been involved in a number of national campaigns.

=== Paid parental leave ===
The Union have actively supported longer statutory paid parental leave, including the recent Parental Leave and Employment Protection (Six Months’ Paid Leave and Work Contact Hours) Amendment Bill which provides six months paid parental leave and guaranteed right to return to work afterwards. The bill is currently stalled in parliament.

=== Academic freedom ===
The Union have campaigned for academic freedom, running an essay competition in cooperation with Academic Freedom Aotearoa. and giving out awards, including to Mike Joy, an academic at Massey University who had a high-profile clash with Prime Minister John Key.

=== Living wage ===
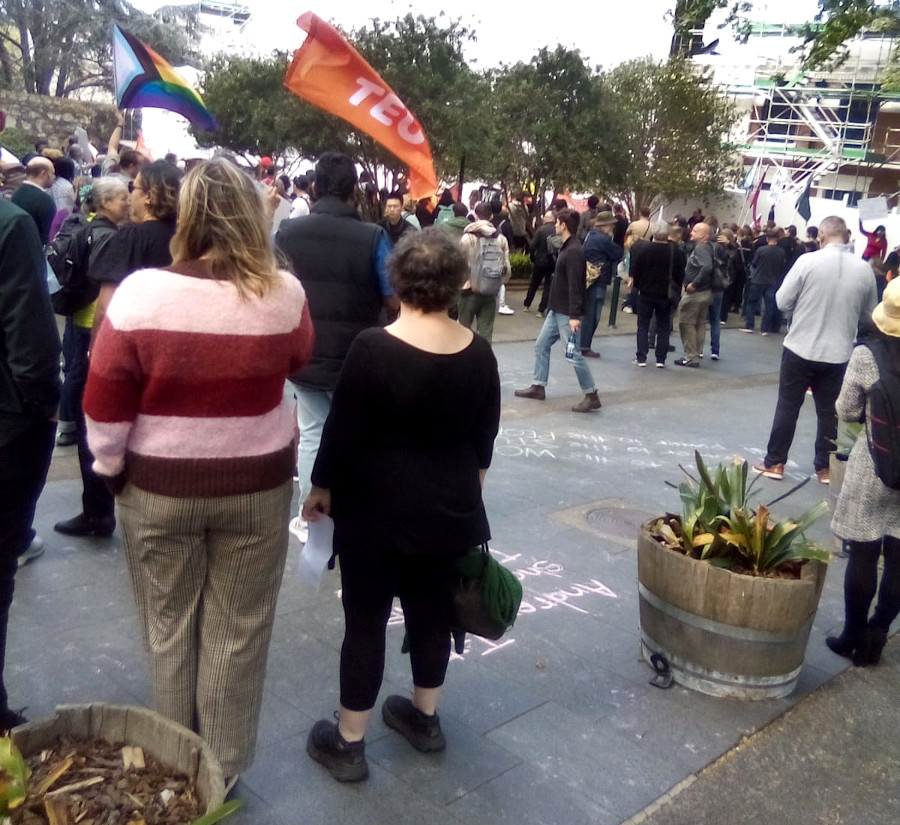
TEU strike rally at the University of Auckland in September 2024, protesting wages

Under the Employment Relations Act 2000 there are limits on what actions a union can take in support of employment relations involving employees other than union members, but the TEU supports the Living Wage Movement Aotearoa NZ which campaigns to raise the legal minimum wage. A number of the TEU's members are paid the current legal minimum wage.

The Tertiary Education Union has engaged in strike action on multiple occasions to advocate pay increases. These have included a strike in New Zealand's eight universities in October 2022, and another in Lincoln University, Massey University, the University of Canterbury, and the University of Auckland during September 2024.

== Membership ==
The Union is present in most tertiary education institutions representing academic, purely teaching, purely research and general staff.

The Union is the members' official representative in employment matters when dealing with their employers (directly or indirectly), many union members (particularly academics and researchers) are also members of the Royal Society of New Zealand (commonly via constituent bodies) as it is the peak professional body in the humanities and the sciences and has legislated roles in science and research funding.

Membership by institution
Institution	Type	Membership	Total Staff	General Members	Academic Members	Notable office-holders and life members
Aoraki Polytechnic	ITP	97	479	0	97	
Bay of Plenty Polytechnic	ITP	25	177	0	25	
Christchurch Polytechnic Institute of Technology	ITP	143	1057	0	143	
Eastern Institute of Technology	ITP	133	352	0	133	
Manukau Institute of Technology	ITP	No Available Data				
Nelson Marlborough Institute of Technology	ITP	73	222	0	73	
NorthTec	ITP	126	230	0	126	
Otago Polytechnic	ITP	282	616	0	282	
Southern Institute of Technology	ITP	No Available Data				
Tai Poutini Polytechnic	ITP	50	95	0	50	
The Open Polytechnic of New Zealand	ITP	80	119	0	80	
Unitec New Zealand	ITP	238	543	0	238	
Universal College of Learning	ITP	204	463	0	204	
Waiariki Institute of Technology	ITP	131	239	0	131	
Waikato Institute of Technology	ITP	128	338	0	128	
Wellington Institute of Technology	ITP	139	247	0	139	
Western Institute of Technology at Taranaki	ITP	88	116	0	88	
Whitireia NZ	ITP	118	257	0	118	
University of Auckland	University	1297	3688	473	824	
Auckland University of Technology	University	744	2642	62	682	
University of Canterbury	University	834	1644	435	577	Jack Heinemann, Garrick Cooper
Lincoln University	University	281	574	136	145	Malcolm Burns, George Hill
Massey University	University	No Available Data				
University of Otago	University	508	1564	0	508	Craig Marshall
Victoria University of Wellington	University	775	1701	281	494	Mere Broughton, Stephen Blumenfeld, David Weatherburn, Dougal McNeill
University of Waikato	University	521	1383	169	352	Te Huirangi Waikerepuru, Cat Pausé
Te Whare Wānanga o Awanuiārangi	Wānanga	No Available Data				
Te Wānanga o Aotearoa	Wānanga	No Available Data				
All data from the 2014 TEU Annual Report

== International ==
Through membership of Education International, TEU is linked to international education groups worldwide, and a wide range of education unions and through membership of the New Zealand Council of Trade Unions, TEU works with other unions to improve the position of all New Zealand workers.

New Zealand Tertiary Education Union
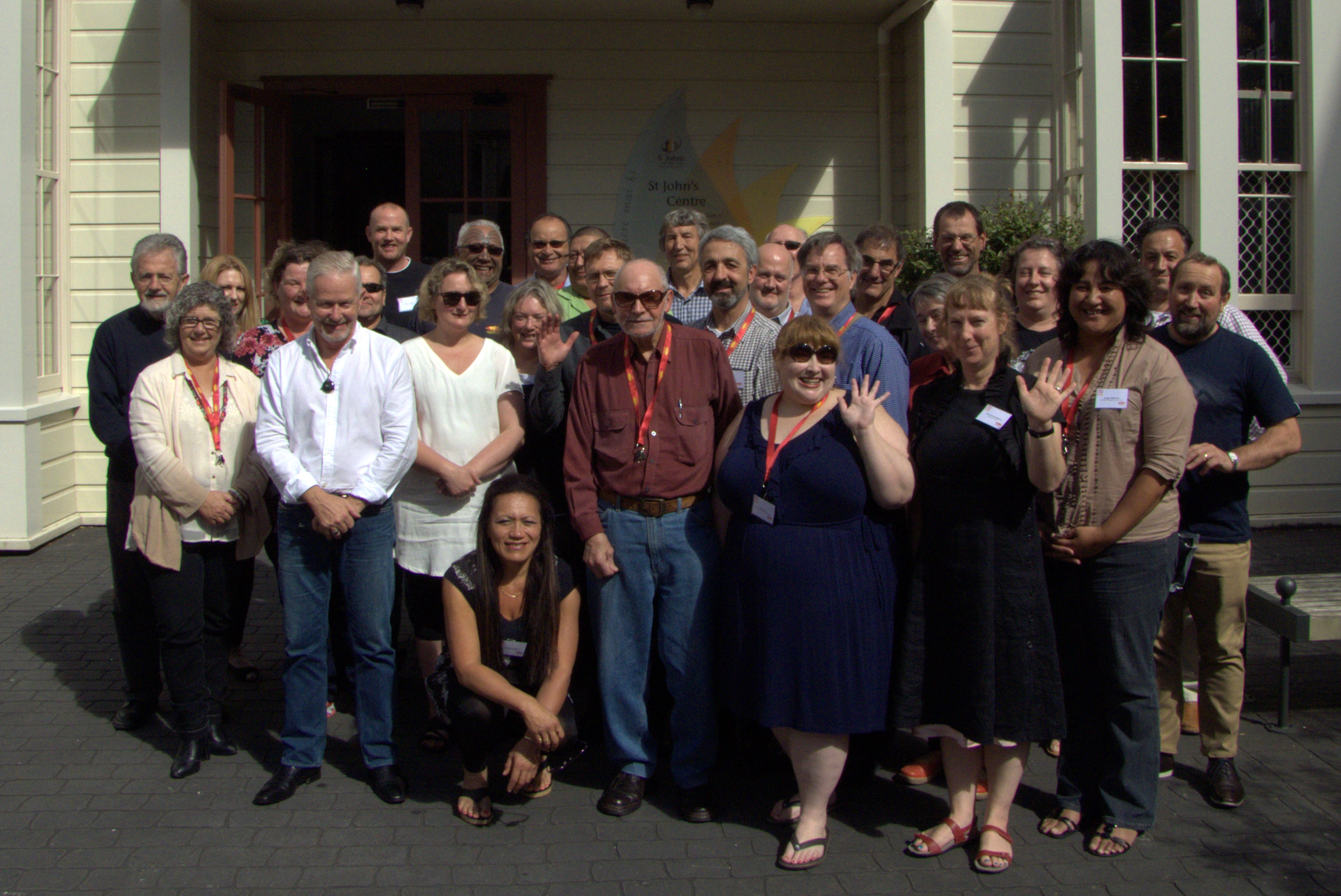
TEU Branch presidents in April 2014

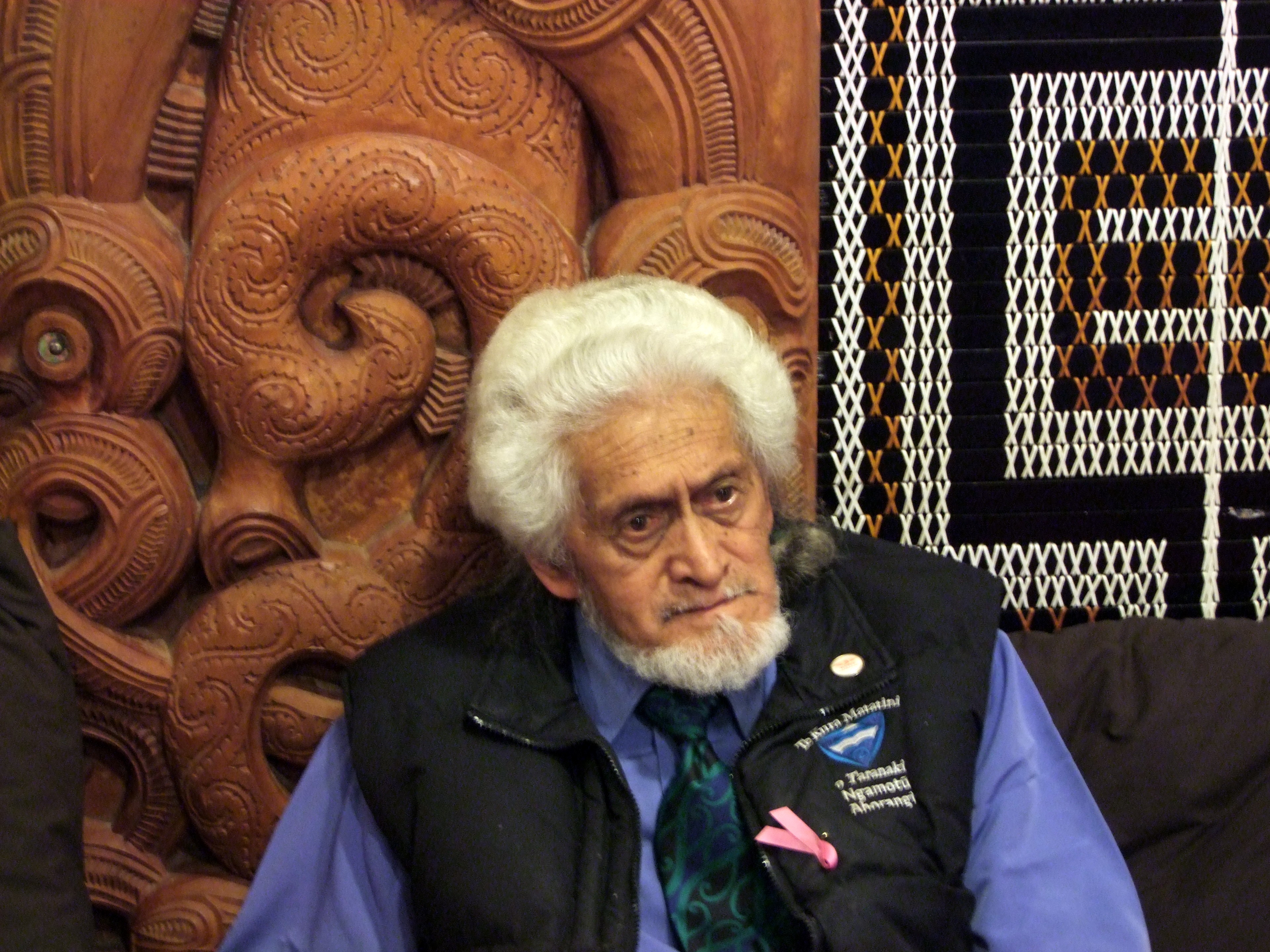
Dr Te Huirangi Waikerepuru, elder of the TEU

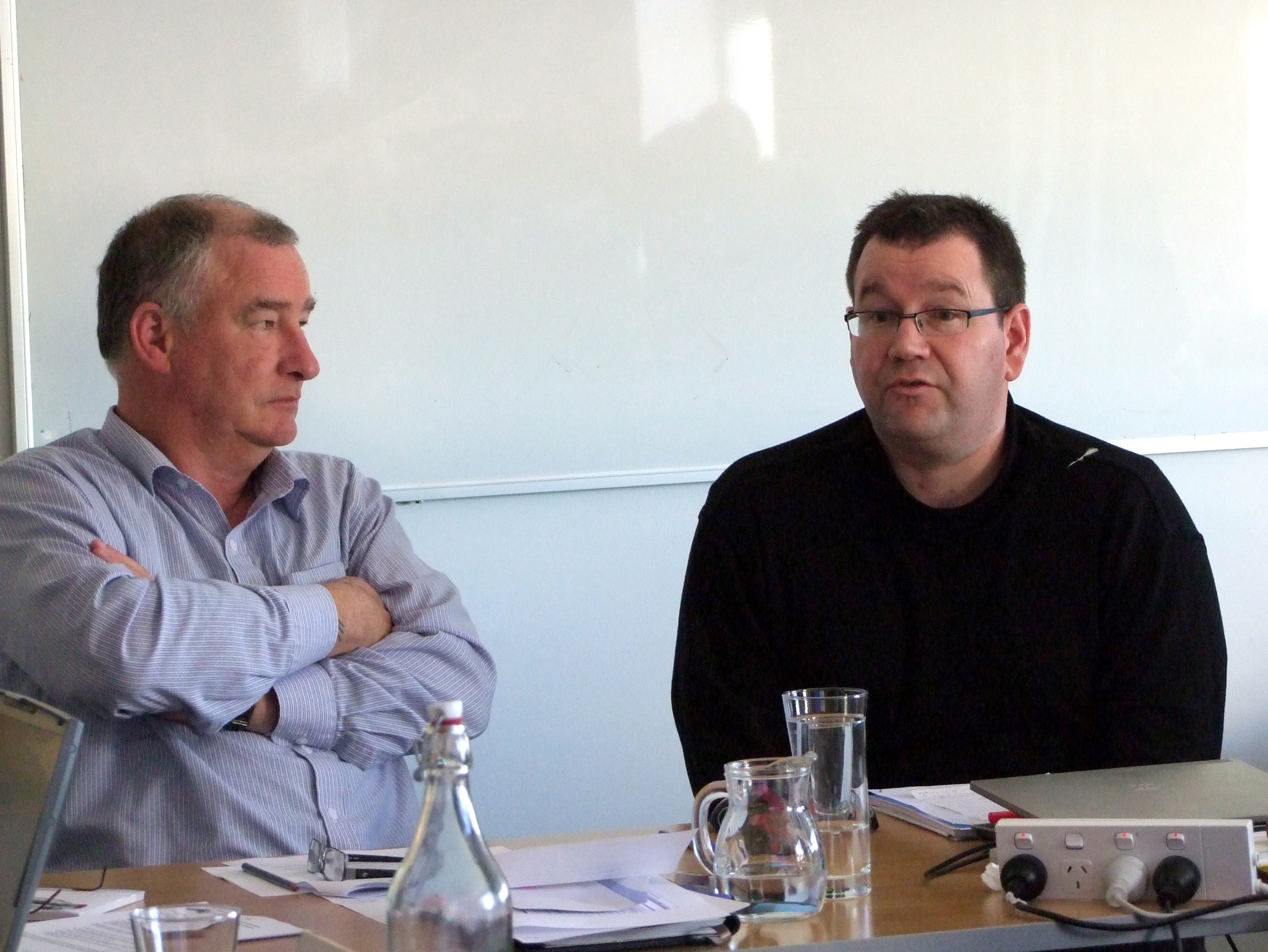
Dr Tom Ryan and Grant Robertson, MP
