= Mere Broughton =

New Zealand activist and unionist (1938–2016)

Mere Broughton QSM
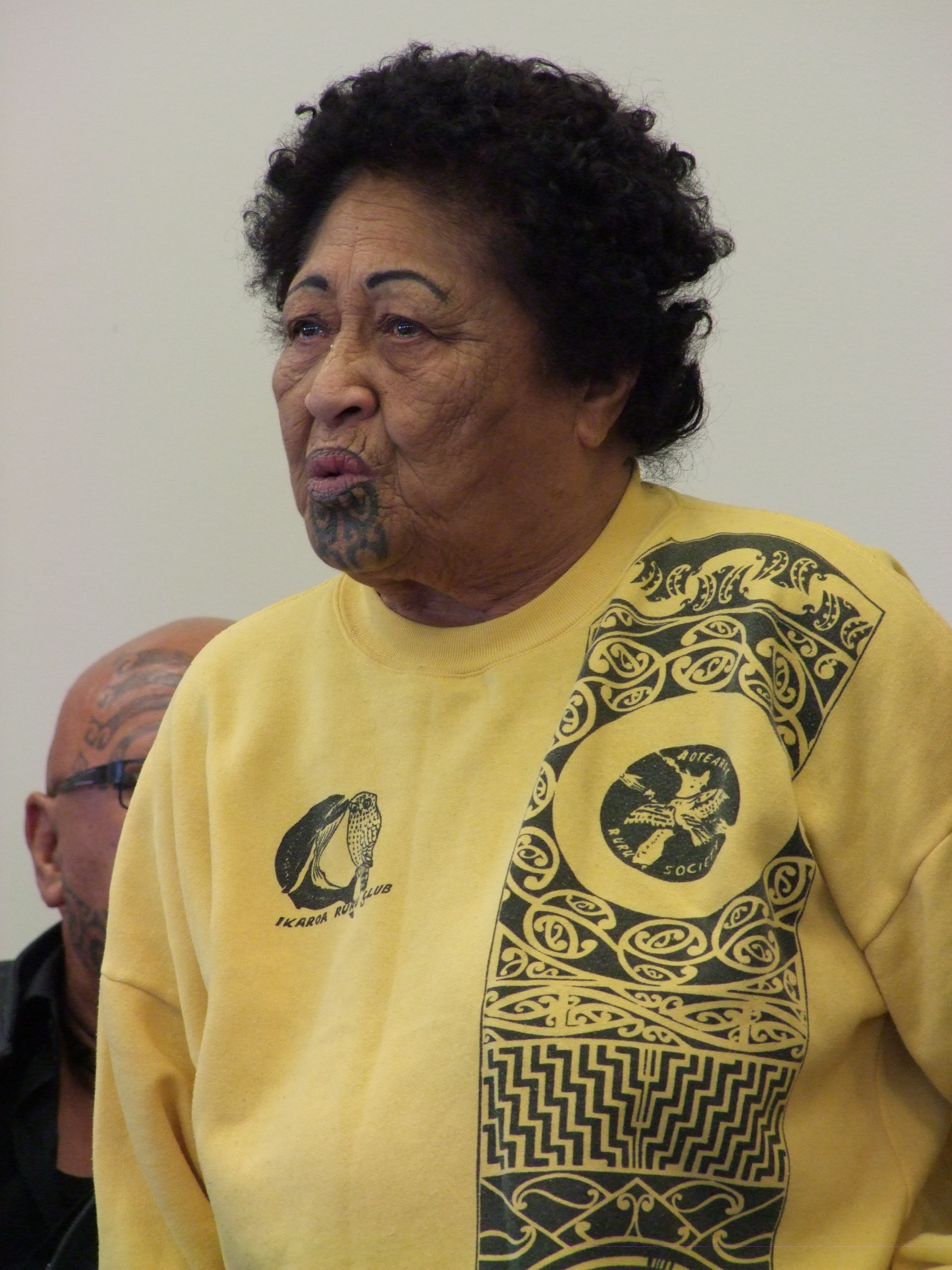
- Mere Broughton at a TEU event in 2015
- Born: Mary Mereiwa Whakaruru; 24 December 1938; Hastings, New Zealand
- Died: 31 January 2016 (aged 77); Waitara, New Zealand
- Resting place: Pākaraka Marae, Whanganui District
- Spouse: Ruka Broughton (m. 1960; div. 1978)

Mary Mereiwa Broughton QSM (née Whakaruru, 24 December 1938 – 31 January 2016), known as Mere Broughton, was a New Zealand Māori language activist and unionist.

== Early life ==
Of Te Āti Awa, Ngāti Awa, Ngāi Tūhoe, Ngāpuhi, Te Arawa and Ngāti Kahungunu descent, she was born on 24 December 1938 in Hastings and raised in Te Teko and Kawerau before training as a nurse and working at Whakatāne Hospital. On 21 May 1960, she married Anglican priest Ruka Broughton, with whom she raised five children. They divorced in 1978.

== Career ==
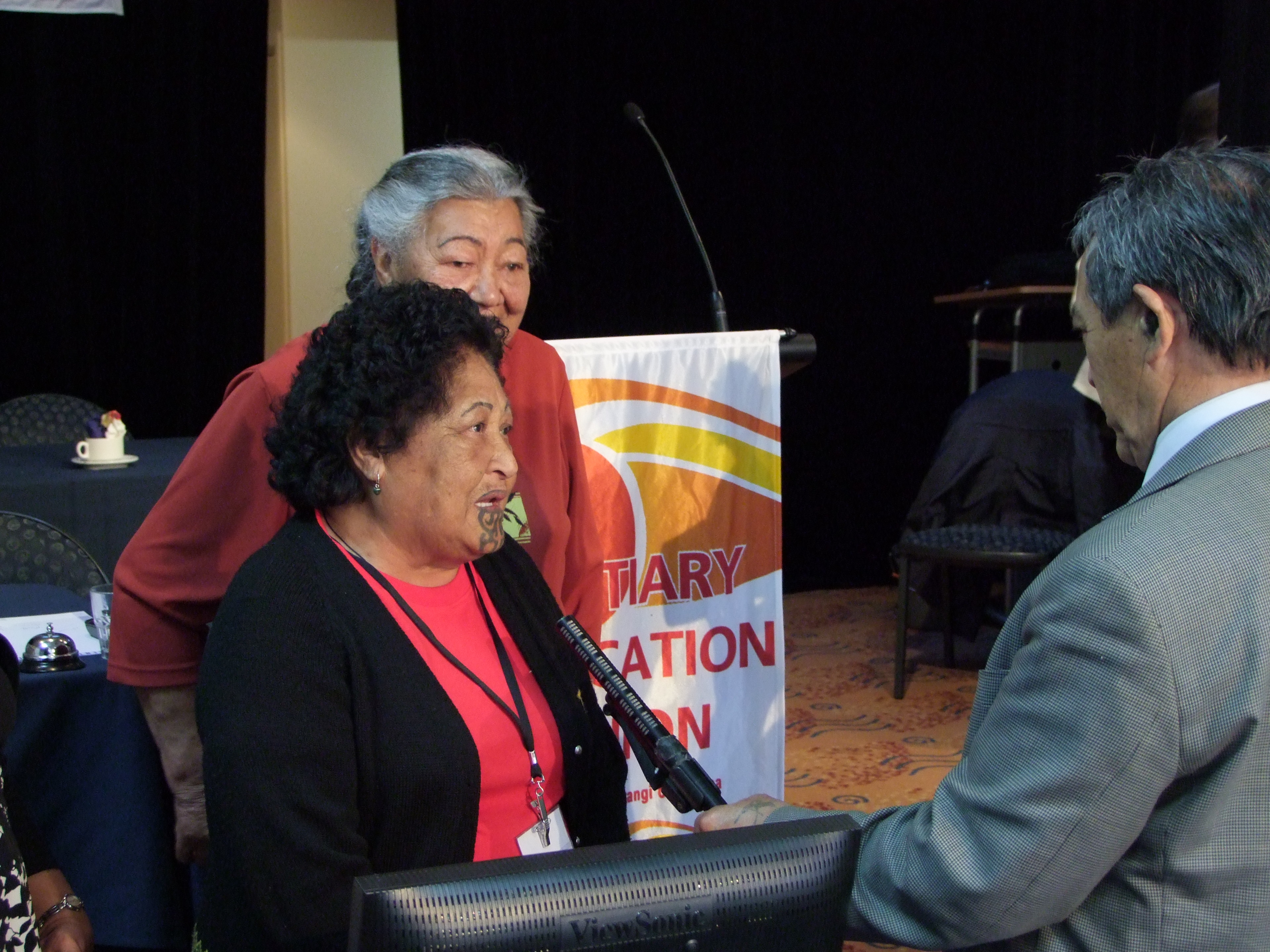
Broughton receiving life membership from the Tertiary Education Union (2010)

In the 1970s and 1980s she worked at Victoria University, co-establishing Te Herenga Waka Marae with Te Huirangi Waikerepuru, Wiremu Parker and her husband. Also at the university she became active in union affairs, in the Association of University Staff (now the TEU). In 2010, she became the TEU's first life member. Broughton was on the Tekaumārua, the advisory board to the Māori King, Tūheitia Paki. In 2014, she was part of the New Zealand delegation that sent off the canoes of the Polynesian Voyaging Society, Hōkūle'a and Hikianalia.

== Death ==
She died on 31 January 2016 at her home in Waitara and was buried at Pākaraka Marae, near Whanganui.

== Honours ==
Broughton was recognised with the Civic Honour Award by Hutt City Council in 1999. She was awarded the Queen's Service Medal for community service in the 2002 New Year Honours. In 2009, she received the Tā Kīngi Ihaka Award from Creative New Zealand in recognition of a lifetime contribution to the development and retention of Māori arts and culture.
