= Dougal McNeill =

New Zealand academic

- Born: 1981 (age 44–45)
- Education: University of Melbourne
- Scientific career
- Workplaces: Sophia University, Tokyo Woman's Christian University, University of Melbourne and Victoria University of Wellington,
- Thesis: Forecasts of the past: globalisation, history and contemporary realism (2008)

Dougal Shelton McNeill is a New Zealand academic and as of 2021 is a senior lecturer in the English Department at the Victoria University of Wellington.

== Academic career ==
After a 2008 PhD titled Forecasts of the past: globalisation, history and contemporary realism at the University of Melbourne, McNeill worked at Sophia University, Tokyo Woman's Christian University and the University of Melbourne. before moving to the Victoria University of Wellington, rising to senior lecturer.

In 2015, he called a visit to Victoria University of Wellington by Israeli soldiers "a propaganda project".

McNeill is involved in the Tertiary Education Union.

== Books ==
McNeill's books include:

- McNeill, Dougal (2005). The many lives of Galileo : Brecht, theatre and translation's political unconscious. Oxford: P. Lang. ISBN 3-03910-536-1. OCLC 61178224.
- McNeill, Dougal (2012). Forecasts of the past : globalisation, history, realism, utopia. Oxford: Peter Lang. ISBN 978-3-0353-0339-1. OCLC 813844953.
- Ferrall, Charles (2015). Writing the 1926 General Strike : literature, culture, politics. Dougal McNeill. New York, NY, USA. ISBN 978-1-107-10003-9. OCLC 894670692.
- British Literature in Transition, 1920–1940: Futility and Anarchy (edited with Charles Ferrall, Cambridge University Press, 2018)
