= Gwendolyn T. Sorell =

American women's studies academic

Gwendolyn Thomas Sorell
- Born: 1 August 1936; Lubbock, Texas
- Died: 23 March 2009 (aged 72); Peoria, Illinois
- Education: Pennsylvania State University
- Scientific career
- Fields: Women's studies
- Workplaces: Texas Tech University
- Thesis: Masculinity and femininity in traditional and nontraditional adult women : a test of the parental imperative (1982)
- Doctoral advisor: Richard M. Lerner
- Doctoral students: Cat Pausé

Gwendolyn Thomas Sorell (Aug. 1, 1936 - March 23, 2009) was an American academic, rising to associate professor of human development and family studies at Texas Tech University.

== Academic career ==
After a 1979 MSc thesis titled 'Adaptive implications of sex-related attitudes and behaviors,' a 1982 PhD titled 'Masculinity and femininity in traditional and nontraditional adult women : a test of the parental imperative' at the Pennsylvania State University, and a post-doc at University of Denver, Sorell moved to the University of Texas Tech, rising to associate professor.

The Gwen Sorell Endowed Scholarship is administered by the Women's & Gender Studies department.

== Activism ==
Sorell served in governance roles in organisations such as the Lubbock Rape Crisis Center, the West Texas AIDS Foundation and the Planned Parenthood Association of Lubbock.

== Selected works ==
- Kiesling, Chris, Gwendolyn T. Sorell, Marilyn J. Montgomery, and Ronald K. Colwell. "Identity and spirituality: A psychosocial exploration of the sense of spiritual self." In Meeting of the Society for Research in Adult Development, Apr, 2003, Tampa, FL, US.
- Sorell, Gwendolyn T., and Marilyn J. Montgomery. "Feminist perspectives on Erikson's theory: Their relevance for contemporary identity development research." Identity: An International Journal of Theory and Research 1, no. 2 (2001): 97–128.
- Morrow, K. Brent, and Gwendolyn T. Sorell. "Factors affecting self-esteem, depression, and negative behaviors in sexually abused female adolescents." Journal of Marriage and the Family (1989): 677–686.
- Montgomery, Marilyn J., and Gwendolyn T. Sorell. "Love and dating experience in early and middle adolescence: Grade and gender comparisons." Journal of adolescence 21, no. 6 (1998): 677–689.
- Montgomery, Marilyn J., and Gwendolyn T. Sorell. "Differences in love attitudes across family life stages." Family Relations (1997): 55–61.
- Fischer, Judith L., Donna L. Sollie, Gwendolyn T. Sorell, and Shelley K. Green. "Marital status and career stage influences on social networks of young adults." Journal of Marriage and the Family (1989): 521–534.
