= David Weatherburn =

Australian-trained New Zealand chemistry academic

- Education: University of Sydney
- Scientific career
- Fields: Chemistry
- Workplaces: Purdue University, Victoria University of Wellington, University of Queensland
- Thesis: The extraction of quaternary salts from water into aprotic solvents. (1968)

David Charles Weatherburn is an Australian-trained, New Zealand chemistry academic.

== Academic career ==
After a MSc and PhD at the University of Sydney in Australia, he did a Postdoc at Purdue University and a brief period at University of Queensland, he joined Victoria University of Wellington in the early 1970s and remained there until his official retirement in 2009. His specialism was coordination chemistry and spectroscopy, but he had a popular sideline in science shows.

In 2011 he was given a Meritorious Service Award by the Tertiary Education Union.

== Selected works ==
- Hotzelmann, R., Wieghardt, K., Floerke, U., Haupt, H. J., Weatherburn, D. C., Bonvoisin, J., ... & Girerd, J. J. (1992). Spin exchange coupling in asymmetric heterodinuclear complexes containing the. mu.-oxo-bis (. mu.-acetato) dimetal core. Journal of the American Chemical Society, 114(5), 1681–1696.
- Bhula, R., Osvath, P., & Weatherburn, D. C. (1988). Complexes of tridentate and pentadentate macrocyclic ligands. Coordination chemistry reviews, 91, 89–213.
- Weatherburn, D. C., Billo, E. J., Jones, J. P., & Margerum, D. W. (1970). Effect of ring size on the stability of polyamine complexes containing linked consecutive rings. Inorganic Chemistry, 9(6), 1557–1559.
- Bhula, R., Gainsford, G. J., & Weatherburn, D. C. (1988). A new model for the oxygen-evolving complex in photosynthesis. A trinuclear. mu. 3-oxomanganese (III) complex which contains a. mu.-peroxo group. Journal of the American Chemical Society, 110(22), 7550–7552.
