= Ruka Broughton =

Nga Rauru; tohunga, Anglican priest, university lecturer

Rangiahuta Alan Herewini Ruka Broughton (21 April 1940 – 17 April 1986) was a New Zealand tohunga, Anglican priest, and university lecturer. Of Māori descent, he identified with the Ngā Rauru iwi. He was born in Wanganui, New Zealand on 21 April 1940, and received his education at Maxwell School, Wanganui Technical College and Te Aute College. He was married to Mere Broughton from 1960 to 1978, and they raised five children. He later remarried to Dolly Sadie Matewhiu Pene and they raised two children.

In 1993 he published a book written entirely in Maōri, Ngaa mahi whakaari a Titokowaru. This comprehensive work covers facets of the life of Tiitokowaru, from his genealogy to his roles as a warrior, chief, tohunga and passive protestor. This book was listed in the 2025 Books of Mana as one of the 180 most significant works of Māori-authored non-fiction.
