= Cat Pausé =

American fat studies academic and activist (1979–2022)

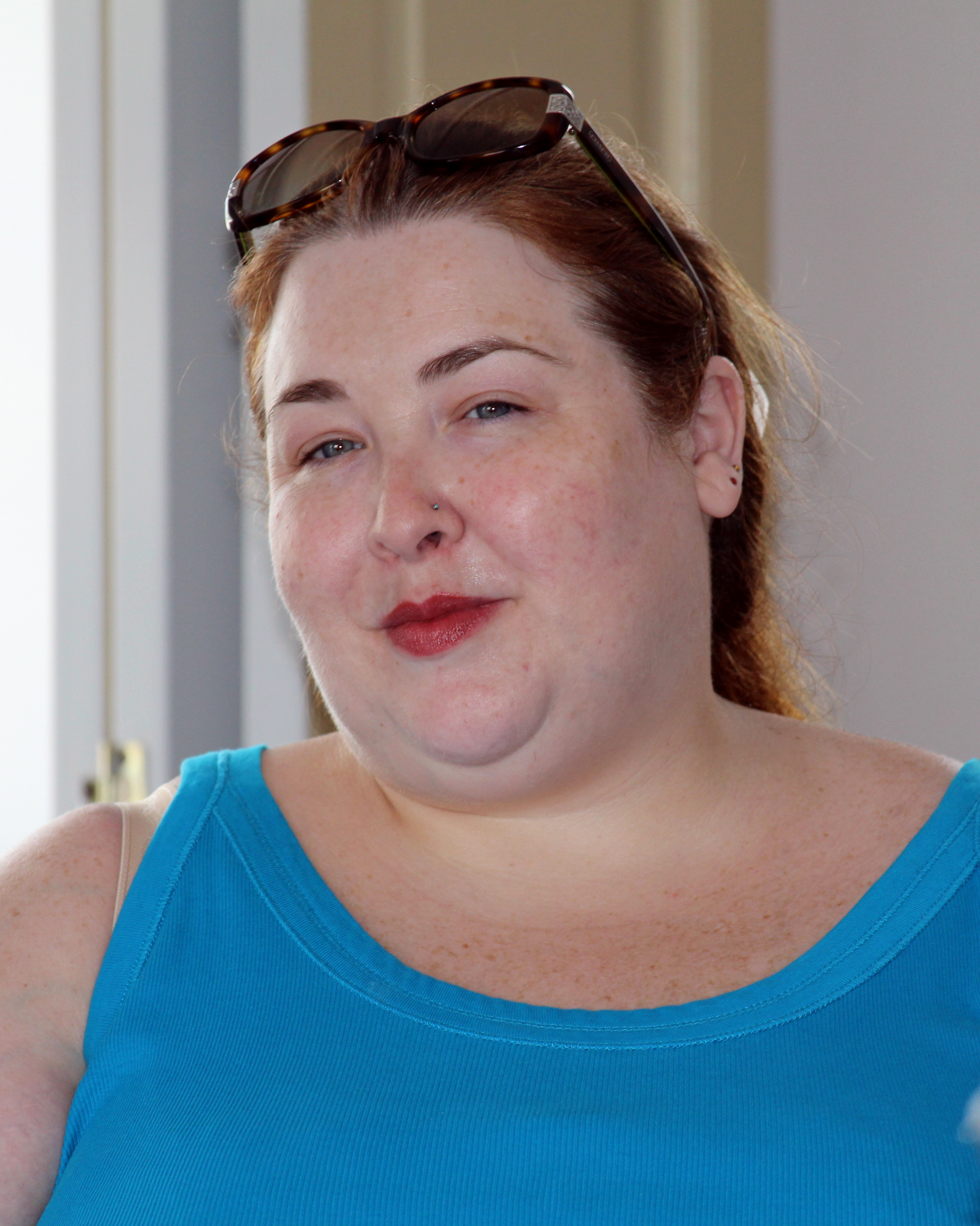
- Pausé in 2016
- Born: Caitlin Clare Pausé; May 29, 1979; Midland, Texas, U.S.
- Died: March 25, 2022 (aged 42); Palmerston North, New Zealand
- Education: Texas State University (BA); Texas Tech University (MA, PhD)
- Scientific career
- Fields: Fat studies, public health
- Workplaces: Massey University
- Thesis: Invisible women: Exploring weight identity in morbidly obese women (2007)
- Doctoral advisor: Gwendolyn T. Sorell

Caitlin Clare "Cat" Pausé (/pɔːˈzeɪ/ paw-ZEI) (29 May 1979 – 25 March 2022) was an American academic specialising in fat studies and a fat activist. From 2008 until her death in 2022 she was a senior lecturer at Massey University in New Zealand.

== Education ==
Caitlin Clare Pausé was born in Midland, Texas on 29 May 1979. She completed a Bachelor of Arts in sociology at Southwest Texas State University in 1999. She attained her Master of Arts at Texas Tech University in 2002, and completed her Doctorate of Philosophy in human development at Texas Tech in 2007. Pausé's doctoral work was done under Gwendolyn T. Sorell and included work on the Adult Identity Development Project. Her dissertation explored weight identity in women who were categorized by health systems as "morbidly obese."

== Scholarship ==
Pausé's scholarship focused on the impact of "fat stigma" on the health and well-being of fat people. She published on "coming out as fat", the barriers to health for fat people, and the role of social media in fat activism and scholarship. She was also interested in "fat pedagogies" and fat ethics.

Pausé was the lead editor of Queering Fat Embodiment (2014). This volume brought together scholarship from various disciplines in order to examine experiences of fat people and intersectionality.

Pausé hosted two international Fat Studies conferences. The first, took place in 2012 and covered topics such as "fat pride", "obesity panic", and teaching children about fatness and fitness. Pausé guest-edited a special issue of the Fat Studies journal on Reflective Intersections. The second conference took place in 2016. and topics covered included "fat embodiment" and public health, the intersections between race and fatness, and how food corporations marketed themselves as addressing childhood obesity.

== Public work and activism ==
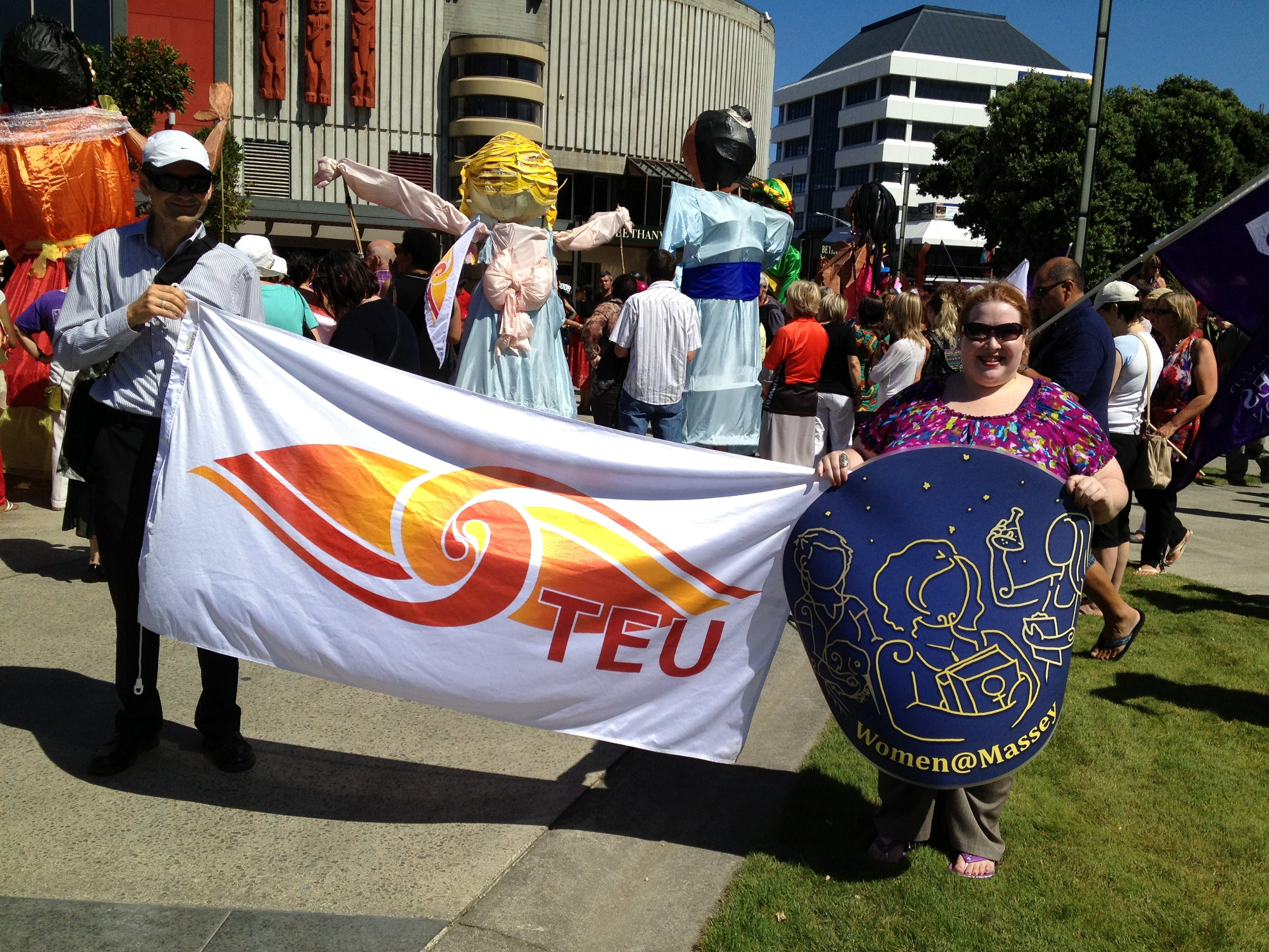
Cat Pausé and Lawrence O'Halloran at a 2013 International Women's Day event in Palmerston North

Pausé was recognised as a public intellectual in the area of fat studies within New Zealand and abroad. Her work was featured in The Huffington Post, Jezebel, and the New Zealand programme 20/20, among others. She was regularly invited to comment on stories related to fatness by national and international media outlets, including ones in Italy, the United Kingdom, and the United States. Across New Zealand, she spoke to Rotary clubs, district health boards, secondary schools, and other groups. She also spoke to Permian Basin Mensa in the United States. She was the keynote speaker at the Women's Health Action Trust Suffrage Breakfast in 2012 in Auckland.

Pausé believed that disseminating scholarship through social media provided for opportunities to broaden academic spaces, enable the participation of different voices, and address the academy's commitment to social justice. To this end, she maintained a blog, Tumblr, and Twitter account, all named Friend of Marilyn. Pause contributed to other online outlets, such as The Conversation (an online journal that provides information, analysis, and commentary; prepared by scholars for a lay audience), Inside Higher Education, Conditionally Accepted, and the Health at Every Size blog. She also wrote two op-eds for national New Zealand media outlets.

Pausé's research and activism has garnered controversy. Shortly before her death, Steven Crowder, an American conservative comedian, uploaded a video on YouTube of himself infiltrating a 2020 online fat studies conference in which Pausé was involved at Massey University. Crowder, under a made-up name, portrayed himself as a gender-queer fat studies activist and scholar, and presented a fake academic paper that was accepted by the conference. Crowder claimed being accepted without question to the conference showed the "idiocy" of the fat studies field. Comments on the video were critical of Pausé. In response, Pausé's friend and former Tertiary Education Union representative Heather Warren said: "A lot of Cat's research is around how fat bodies and fat people are dehumanised in our society, and the comments online further go to validate that even in death fat people are dehumanised by society and discriminated against by our society."

=== Friend of Marilyn podcast ===
The Friend of Marilyn podcast began in 2011, hosted by 999AM Access Manawatu. Friend of Marilyn had over 500 regular listeners from across the world. Pausé undertook a world tour in 2015 and 2016 interviewing people from across the world for the show.

=== Fat activism ===
Pausé advocated for fat people and claimed that they were discriminated against and deserved the "same rights and dignity" as non-fat people. Her work included speaking about what she perceived as discrimination against fat people in numerous areas of life, including the workplace, what she claimed was a lack of legal protections that fat people were afforded, "fat shaming" in the medical community, and what she called the erasure of fat people's sexuality.

=== Fuck, Yeah! Fat PhDs ===
Fuck, Yeah! Fat PhDs was a Tumblr created by Pausé. The Tumblr was created in response to Professor Geoffrey Miller having tweeted that fat people did not have the willpower to complete a PhD program. The tweet prompted backlash, and many individuals wrote to him or his employer to protest his comment. Pausé created Fuck Yeah! Fat PhDs in response.

She explained:

I’m not interested in responding to Dr. Miller. While I appreciate those who want to call him out, and yes he deserves it, I’m more interested in addressing the social narratives in which individual comments like Dr. Miller’s are encouraged. I’m also interested in the structural aspects of fat oppression. I decided that what I wanted to do was to highlight all the amazing fat individuals who are in graduate school, or have completed graduate school – to provide a visual repository for anyone who doubts that fat individuals lack the abilities or qualities to succeed in academia.

=== Tertiary Education Union ===
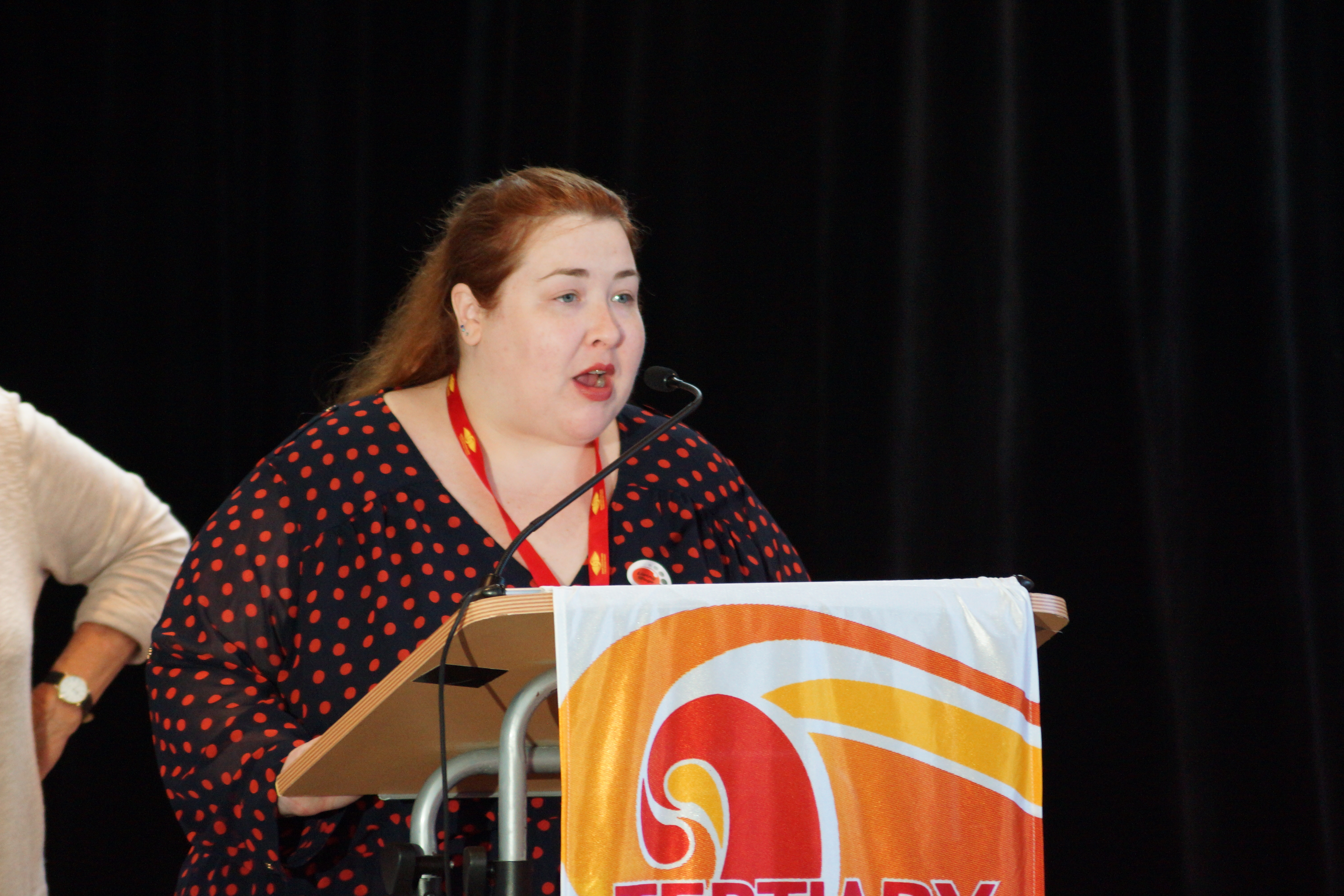
Cat Pausé speaking in 2012 from behind a TEU lectern

Pausé was involved with the Tertiary Education Union at a national level, sitting on the national council as Women’s Vice-President for six years and also academic representative.

== Death ==
At the age of 42, Pausé died suddenly in her sleep at her home in Palmerston North on 25 March 2022. In May 2023, Massey University announced the establishment of a scholarship fund in her memory, endowed by her parents. Her cause of death was not disclosed.

== Selected works ==
=== Books ===
- Pausé, C. J., Wykes, J., & Murray, S (Eds). (2014). Queering fat embodiment. London: Ashgate.

=== Book chapters ===
- Pausé, C. J. (2016). "Promise to try: Teaching fat pedagogies in tertiary education." In E. Carter & C. Russell (Eds.), Fat pedagogy reader: Challenging weight-based oppression in education (pp. 53–60), Peter Lang Publishers.
- Pausé, C. J. (2015). "Human nature: On fat sexual identity and agency." In H. Hester & C. Walters (Eds.), Fat sex: New directions in theory and activism (pp. 37–50), Ashgate.
- Pausé, C. J. (2014). "Causing a commotion: Queering fatness in cyberspace." In C. J. Pausé, J. Wykes, & S. Murray (Eds.), Queering fat embodiment (pp. 75–88). London: Ashgate.
- Pausé, C. J. (2014). "Express yourself: Fat activism in the Web 2.0 age." In R. Chastain (Ed.), The politics of size: Perspectives from the fat-acceptance movement (pp. 1–8). Santa Barbara: Praeger Publishing.

=== Journal articles ===
- Lee, J. A. & Pausé, C. J. (2016). "Stigma in practice: Barriers to health for fat women." Frontiers in Psychology, 7, 2063.
- Pausé, C. J. & Russell, D. (2016). "Sociable scholarship: The use of social media in the 21st century academy." Journal of Applied Social Theory, 1(1), 5-25.
- Pausé, C. J. (2015). "Rebel heart: Performing fatness wrong online." M/C, 18(3).
- Pausé, C. J. (2014). "Die another day: The obstacles facing fat people in accessing shame-free and evidenced-based healthcare." Narrative Inquiry in Bioethics, 4 (3), 135–141.
- Pausé, C. J. (2014). "X-static process: Intersectionality within the field of fat studies." Fat Studies: An Interdisciplinary Journal of Body Weight and Society, 3 (2), 80–85.
- Pausé, C. J., Waitere, H., Wright, J., Powell, K., & gilling, m. (2012). "We say what we are & we do as we say: Feminisms in practice." Feminist Review, 102, 79–96. DOI: 10.1057/fr.2011.50
- Pausé, C. J. (2012). "Live to tell: Coming out as fat." Somatechnics, 2 (1), 42–56.
- Waitere, H., Tremaine, M., Wright, J., Brown, S., & Pausé, C. J. (2011). "Choosing to resist or reinforce the new managerialism: The impact of performance based research funding on academic identity." Higher Education Research & Development, 30 (2), 205–217.
