= Craig Marshall (academic) =

New Zealand biochemistry academic

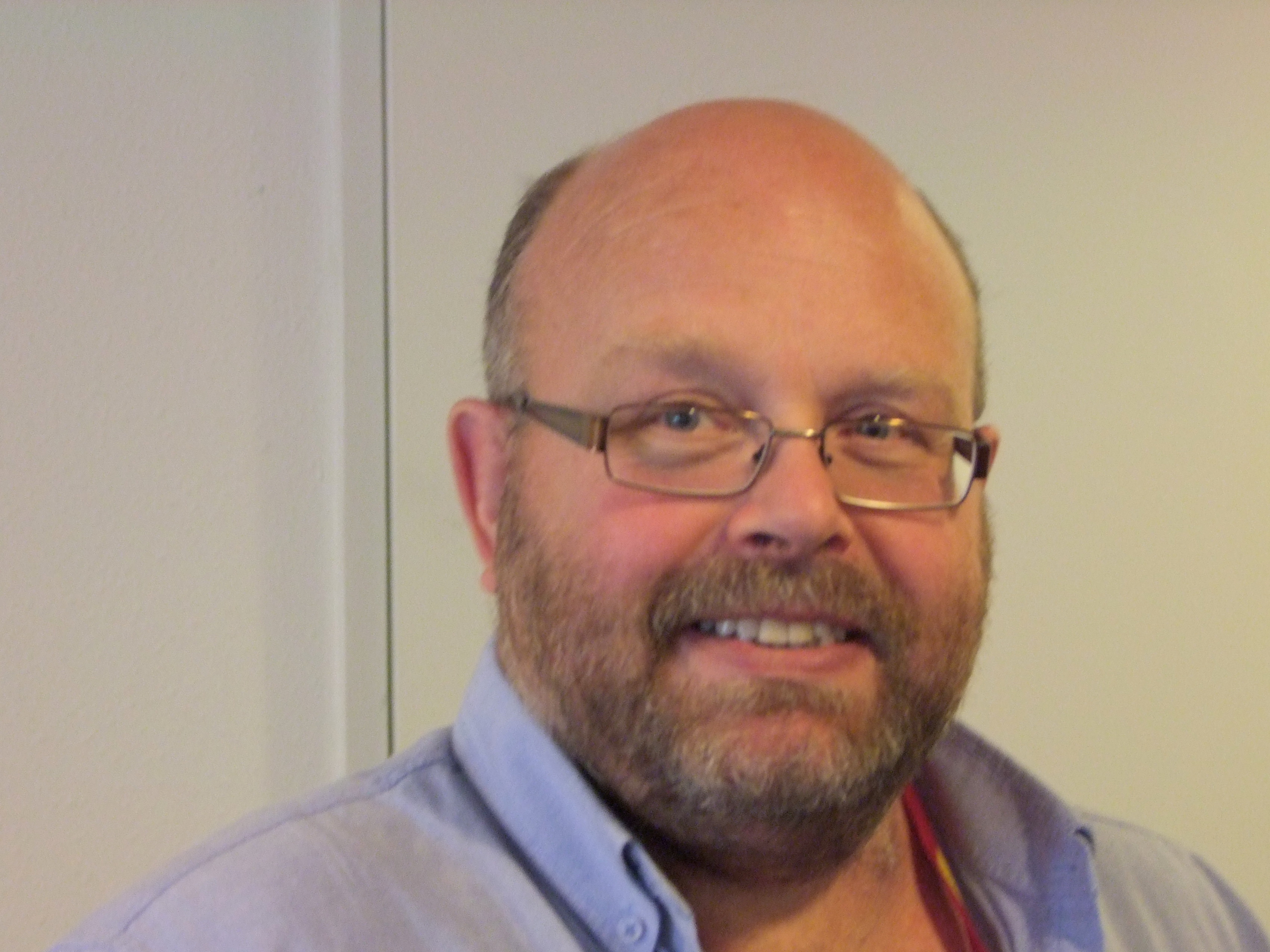
- Craig Marshall in 2012
- Born: 1961 (age 64–65)
- Education: University of Otago
- Scientific career
- Fields: Biochemistry
- Workplaces: University of Otago
- Thesis: Structures of the haemoglobins of the brine shrimp, Artemia : an examination of their properties and synthesis (1988)

Craig J. Marshall is a New Zealand biochemistry academic, and as of 2021 is an associate professor at the University of Otago.

== Academic career ==
After a 1988 PhD titled 'Structures of the haemoglobins of the brine shrimp, Artemia: an examination of their properties and synthesis' at the University of Otago, Marshall joined the staff, rising to associate professor.

Marshall is involved in the Tertiary Education Union and has sat on the university council.

== Selected works ==
- Otani, S., C. J. Marshall, W. P. Tate, G. V. Goddard, and W. C. Abraham. "Maintenance of long-term potentiation in rat dentate gyrus requires protein synthesis but not messenger RNA synthesis immediately post-tetanization." Neuroscience 28, no. 3 (1989): 519–526.
- Tristem, Michael, Craig Marshall, A. Karpas, and F. Hill. "Evolution of the primate lentiviruses: evidence from vpx and vpr." The EMBO journal 11, no. 9 (1992): 3405–3412.
- Marshall, Craig J. "Cold-adapted enzymes." Trends in biotechnology 15, no. 9 (1997): 359–364.
- Cutfield, S. M., E. J. Dodson, B. F. Anderson, P. C. E. Moody, C. J. Marshall, P. A. Sullivan, and J. F. Cutfield. "The crystal structure of a major secreted aspartic proteinase from Candida albicans in complexes with two inhibitors." Structure 3, no. 11 (1995): 1261–1271.
- Tristem, Michael, Craig Marshall, Abraham Karpas, Juraj Petrik, and Fergal Hill. "Origin of vpx in lentiviruses." Nature 347, no. 6291 (1990): 341–342.
- Denton, Michael, and Craig Marshall. "Laws of form revisited." Nature 410, no. 6827 (2001): 417-417.
