= Stephen Blumenfeld =

American-New Zealand academic

- Other name: Stephen Bernard Blumenfeld
- Education: University of Illinois at Urbana–Champaign
- Scientific career
- Thesis: A Union Contract-Level Analysis of the Impact of Corporate Mergers and Acquisitions on Wage Bargaining Outcomes (1997)
- Doctoral advisor: Wallace Hendricks

Stephen Bernard Blumenfeld is an American-New Zealand labor-relations academic.

== Academic career ==
After degrees from Carroll University, University of Wisconsin-Madison and University of Illinois at Urbana–Champaign, Blumenfeld got his PhD, also from Illinois, in 1997. He started at Victoria University of Wellington in 1999, rising to become Senior Lecturer and Director of the Centre for Labour Employment and Work. He has also worked at Drake University and Simon Fraser University

Blumenfeld's work regularly gets reported in the New Zealand national media.

In 2013 he was awarded a Meritorious Service Award by the Tertiary Education Union.

== Selected works ==
- Malik, A., & Blumenfeld, S. (2012). Six Sigma, quality management systems and the development of organisational learning capability: Evidence from four business process outsourcing organisations in India. International Journal of Quality & Reliability Management, 29(1), 71–91.
- Malik, A., Sinha, A., & Blumenfeld, S. (2012). Role of quality management capabilities in developing market-based organisational learning capabilities: Case study evidence from four Indian business process outsourcing firms. Industrial Marketing Management, 41(4), 639–648.
- Blumenfeld, S. B., & Partridge, M. D. (1996). The long-run and short-run impacts of global competition on US union wages. Journal of Labor Research, 17(1), 149–171.
- Blumenfeld, S. B., & Thickett, G. (2003). Surfing the knowledge wave: The impact of information and communication technology (ICT) on'decent work'in New Zealand. New Zealand Journal of Employment Relations, 28(1), 1.
- Plimmer, G., Wilson, J., Bryson, J., Blumenfeld, S., Donnelly, N., & Ryan, B. (2013). Workplace dynamics in New Zealand public services. Wellington: Industrial Relations Centre, Victoria University of Wellington, 56–60.
