= Transgender rights in New Zealand =

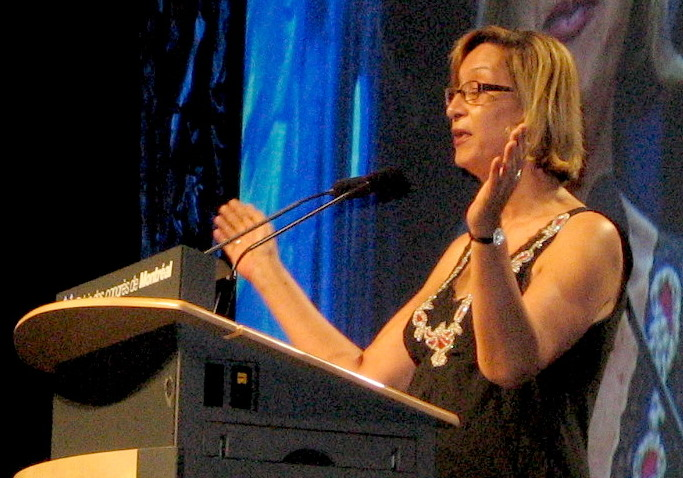
Georgina Beyer, the first New Zealand transgender member of parliament, pictured addressing the Asia/Pacific plenary session of the International Conference on LGBT Human Rights in Montreal in 2006

Transgender and non-binary people in New Zealand are protected by law, however may still face discrimination in other aspects of their lives. The law is interpreted to protect against discrimination based on gender identity, however the law is unclear on the legal status of discrimination against intersex people.

Currently, the Human Rights Act 1993 prohibits discrimination on the basis of gender. However, it is through interpretation by the solicitor general of the time that gender identity is protected under the laws preventing discrimination on the basis of sex or sexual orientation. This interpretation has not been tested in court and is not known if it will be upheld. Some overseas courts have determined that transgender people are covered by prohibitions on discrimination based on sex, but there is also international case law suggesting it is not. Likewise, placing gender identity under the prohibitions on the grounds of sexual orientation is may be problematic. While there is some inconsistent international case law, it has been noted that gender identification and sexual orientation are too unrelated for this to be suitable.

In 2025, the Law Commission published a report recommending amendments to the Human Rights Act 1993 to, among other changes, list "Gender identity or its equivalents in the cultures of the person" and "Having an innate variation of sex characteristics" as prohibited grounds of discrimination in section 21 of the act. In 2026, Justice Minister Paul Goldsmith acknowledged the report, but indicated that the Government would not take any action to implement its recommendations. The Government's official response stated that it was "not a priority."

The International Commission of Jurists and the International Service for Human Rights in 2007 created the Yogyakarta Principles to apply international human rights law to gender identity and sexual orientation. The first and arguably most important is that human rights are available to all humans, regardless of gender identity, and that states should amend legislation "to ensure its consistency with the universal enjoyment of all human rights." This report suggested that transgender people were "one of the most marginalised groups" in New Zealand, leading the Human Rights Commission to publish a comprehensive inquiry entitled To Be Who I Am in 2008, which outlined some of the concerns listed below. Transgender rights organisations carry out over 1,300 individual peer supports each year, with many of these addressing breaches of universal human rights. These concerns are particularly important considering that the discrimination and exclusion has been shown to increase the risk of mental health issues and suicide.

Gender reassignment surgery is available in New Zealand, though there are cost barriers to accessing such surgery. New Zealanders are legally permitted to apply to change the designation of their gender on government documents. The legalisation of same-sex marriage in 2013 removed the requirement to divorce if one was already married.

== Demographics ==
According to Statistics New Zealand using data from the 2021 Household Economic Survey, there are approximately 19,400 transgender and non-binary adults (18 and over) in New Zealand. Approximately 5,500 of these identify as male, 5,400 as female, and 8,500 as another gender. The Auckland region had the largest transgender and non-binary population at 6,900, followed by the Wellington region (3,300), Canterbury (2,900), and Waikato (1,200).

New Zealand's transgender and non-binary population is younger compared to the cisgender population. Just under half (47.2%) of the transgender and non-binary population is aged under 35, compared to 30.8% of the cisgender population. In terms of ethnicity, 72.7% of the transgender and non-binary population are European (compared to 69.3%), 14.6% are Māori (14.0%), 6.7% are Pacific peoples (6.7%) and 16.9% are Asian (16.2%) (totals add to more than 100% since people may identify with multiple ethnicities).

Around 23.9% of transgender and non-binary people had a bachelor or higher degree (compared to 26.5% of the cisgender population), and 14.7% had no formal qualifications (compared to 18.8%). Around 5.0% of transgender and non-binary people are unemployed, 63.3% are employed, and 29.5% are not in the labour force (compared to 3.0%, 65.6% and 28.0% respectively for the cisgender population). The transgender and non-binary population had an average annual disposable income of NZ$28,475, compared to $42,628 for the cisgender population. After adjusting for age, the average annual disposable income is $32,172 for the transgender and non-binary population, compared to $42,611 for the cisgender population.

== Cultural discrimination ==
Discrimination on the basis of gender identity can also be cultural discrimination, as in New Zealand, several cultures have a history of differences in gender identity. Transgender Māori people — tangata ira tane (male who was born female), and whakawahine, hinehi, and hinehua (female who was born male) – were observed by the first European explorers to New Zealand. Cultures which accept transgender people can create positive environments for their members to determine their own gender identity. Transgender people from these communities may be aware of the potential to transition earlier, and may be less likely to require or desire genital surgery. However, there are also general concerns that Māori patients have reduced health access and receive fewer referrals and medical tests.

== Discrimination in the workplace ==
Discrimination in the workplace particularly relates to access to employment, job retention and safety in the workplace. An inability to find a job can cause financial difficulties, but also can cause a person to feel disconnected from the world. Transgender people have reported harassment, violations of privacy, and unfair dismissals at the workplace.

In light of the findings of the Human Rights Commission, the Department of Labour has issued a guide to transgender people in the workplace. It specifies that unless gender identity affects the ability to perform a job, employers or prospective employers are not permitted to ask if a person is transgender. Discrimination in the workplace on the basis of gender identity is prohibited by the Human Rights Act and can be referred to the Human Rights Commission.

== The right to healthcare, and protection from discrimination on basis of health ==
The use of gender-affirming care for transgender people is supported by The Professional Association for Transgender Health Aotearoa (PATHA), The Royal Australian and New Zealand College of Psychiatrists (RANZCP), The Australian and New Zealand Professional Association for Transgender Health (ANZPATH), the Society of Youth Health Professionals Aotearoa New Zealand (SYHPANZ), the New Zealand Sexual Health Society and the New Zealand Society of Endocrinology.

The health issues faced by transgender and non-binary people are particularly complex. Many general practitioners in New Zealand are unaware of medical issues and practices for transgender people, which is problematic when GPs are required to refer their patient on to specialist services. It is difficult to have a set practice for transgender and non-binary people because their needs and wants can be highly individualised, particularly in relation to cultural considerations and as gender identities can vary greatly from simply "male" or "female".

Currently, the Human Rights Act 1993 prohibits discrimination on the basis of disability, including psychological abnormality. However, the Human Rights Commission Action Plan of 2004 noted that associating gender identity with "abnormality" can have a negative impact on the lives of those affected. Whilst the medical community accepts transgender identification as a medical issue, there is concern with it being depicted as an illness. Currently a diagnosis of Gender Identity Disorder is often required before further treatment or referrals can be given. The World Professional Association for Transgender Health has stated that gender identification is very broad and crosses cultures and should not be considered as an illness, particularly as this can lead to stigma which can lead to mental health issues in those with different gender identities. Whilst gender dysphoria may be severe enough in some cases to justify a mental health diagnosis, there is concern that this diagnosis is used as "a license for the stigmatization or for the deprivation of civil and human rights".

The cost of healthcare can be a significant barrier. Input from a mental health professional may be required for further treatment but not funded, limiting the service to those who can afford it. Four types of hormone treatments are subsidised through Pharmac, including puberty blockers, oestrogen, androgen blockers and testosterone. Currently, psychological input or counselling may be required to ensure fully informed consent, as some treatments are not fully reversible.

The average cost of genital reconstruction surgery in New Zealand is $53,400 for male-to-female surgeries and $218,900 for female-to-male surgeries. Furthermore, there is only one genital reconstruction surgeon in New Zealand. The Ministry of Health provides for around 14 publicly funded genital reconstruction surgeries every year; 10 surgeries were performed in 2021 and nine surgeries in 2022. As of February 2023, there is a waiting list of 410 people for publicly funded surgery, meaning the wait could be substantial. Transgender people are forced to wait or pay for private surgery.

The barriers to health access which affect transgender people have been shown to be higher for children and teenagers, because many of the specialists cater only to adults.

In April 2024, the Ministry refused to confirm or deny whether it would follow the British Government's move to restrict the use of puberty blockers following the Cass Review.

In November 2024, the Ministry of Health under New Zealand First and the ACT Party released an evidence brief on puberty blockers. The brief found there to be a lack of evidence for both the efficacy and harms of puberty blockers and recommended "a more precautionary approach". However, it also found that "the evidence published to date, while of low quality, all indicates the use of pubertal blockers is safe". The country did not ban puberty blockers and a doctor who provides the treatments in New Zealand said it "would not change the way in which he practiced".

On November 19, 2025, the Ministry of Health under New Zealand First and the ACT Party and led by Simeon Brown, announced a ban on puberty blockers for minors with gender dysphoria set to take effect on December 19, 2025. Minors with gender dysphoria already on puberty blockers will be able to continue them and the drug will also remain available for other uses like early onset puberty. Brown cited the Cass Review in his decision and said the ban will remain in place until the completion of the United Kingdom's clinical trial on puberty blockers. The ban was strongly condemned by the Royal Australian and New Zealand College of Psychiatrists (RANZCP), the Professional Association for Transgender Health Aotearoa (PATHA) and multiple other doctors in New Zealand. The ban was welcomed by right-wing political parties in New Zealand including the ruling New Zealand First and ACT party coalition, and was condemned by the opposition centre-left Labour Party as well as members of the Green Party. On 1 December 2025, PATHA filed a court challenge to seek an injunction to stop the incoming ban on new puberty blocker prescriptions, which is expected to come into force on 19 December. On 17 December, Wellington High Court Justice Michele Wilkinson-Smith upheld PATHA's bid to delay the new puberty block prescriptions, pending a judicial review.

On 21 October 2026, the High Court ruled that the Government's 2025 regulations banning new puberty blocker prescriptions for children and young people with gender dysphoria were unlawful. The ruling was welcomed by PATHA president Jennifer Shields and vice president Dr Elizabeth McElrea, who said that moves to restrict transgender rights were "rooted in disinformation" and that decisions about this healthcare were best made by patients and their doctors. By contrast, Family First New Zealand chief executive Bob McCoskrie condemned the High Court and accused them of siding with activists over vulnerable children. Similarly, New Zealand First leader Winston Peters called on the Health Minister to appeal the High Court ruling. A spokesperson for the Health Minister said the Government was committed to introducing new safeguards for puberty blockers while ensuring that patients with medical needs could still access healthcare.

== Gender identity and youth ==
Many of the transgender people who assisted with the To Be Who I Am inquiry reported that they knew from a young age that they had a different gender identity. A culture of stereotypes and negative beliefs about transgender people can lead to severe social difficulties for children exploring their gender. Some trans people in New Zealand have reported both physical and sexual abuse from their parents.

Transgender status in New Zealand can currently impact on a child's right to an education. Failure to recognise when a child legally changes gender, being forced to use the wrong toilets, and bullying are problems. Youth 19 research report showed transgender students were five times as likely to be bullied on a weekly basis than their cisgender counterparts. Some transgender children have been forced to leave schools, or find there is no school that will accept them. Bullying is a significant problem for transgender students, reported as being almost five times higher than that experienced by non-transgender students. Problems like being assigned a uniform for a gender with which a child does not identify, pressure from the school to wear it, and being forced to wear that uniform as a punishment have been reported to the Human Rights Commission.

In 2012 a health survey was undertaken of 8,500 New Zealand secondary school students, and discovered that approximately 4% were either transgender or unsure about their gender. 40% of those students who identified as transgender indicated significant depressive symptoms and one in five had attempted suicide in the last year.

== Civil and political rights ==
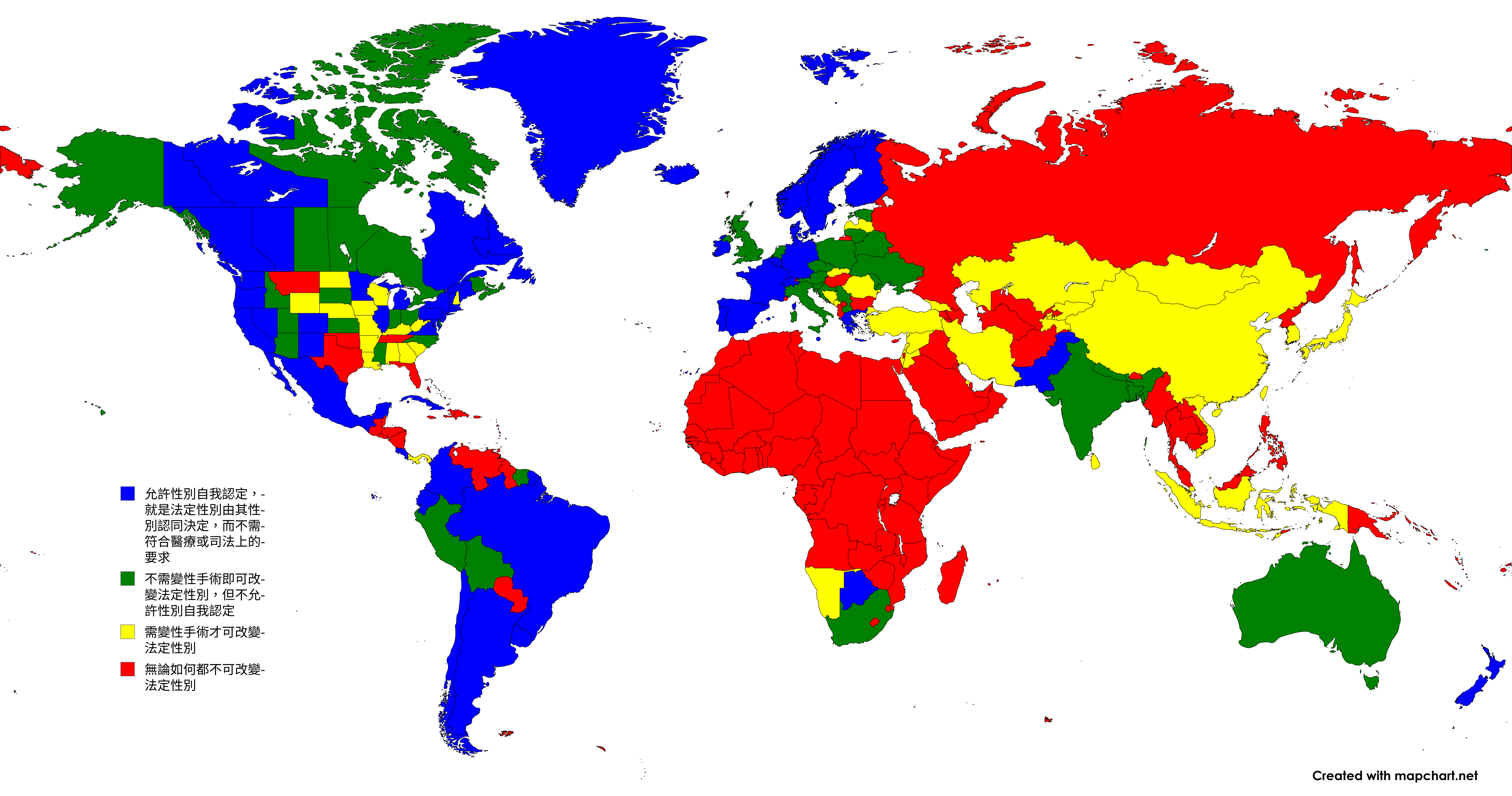
Laws concerning gender identity-expression by country or territory in 2025: Gender self-identification Legal identity change, surgery not required, but not gender self-identification Legal identity change, surgery required No legal identity change New Zealand allows legal identity change without the requirement of sex-reassignment surgery, as well as gender self-identification

The process for legally changing one's sex on legal documents differs depending on the type of document. In the past there have been significant barriers to transgender people in New Zealand wanting to legally change their name and sex / gender identity on official documents, but recent changes in recent years have eased such barriers.

Since 2023 applicants who were born in New Zealand have been able to change the sex marker on their birth certificate by applying to the Registrar of Births, Deaths and Marriages, supplying a statutory declaration of their gender identity and paying the prescribed fee. Minors under 18 will also need the consent of their legal guardian or a letter of recommendation from a suitable third party stating that the minor gives informed consent to changing their sex marker. Before 2023 to change one's sex on a birth certificate, the applicant had to show that they had undergone "permanent medical changes". This had been interpreted as meaning that a transgender person who has not had genital reconstruction surgery or hormones could not change their sex on their birth certificate. In 2021 Counting Ourselves (2019) report showed over 80% of transgender people in New Zealand had an incorrect gender marker on their birth certificate.

Gender markers on New Zealand passports can be changed when applying for or renewing a passport. The allowed genders are male (M), female (F), and gender diverse (X). If the applicant is under 16, the application also must include a letter of support from a registered counsellor or medical professional. The process is similar in the case of changing sex on a citizenship certificate.

New Zealand driver licences do not have a gender marker printed on them, although the licence holder's gender is recorded on the driver licence register. The gender on the register can be changed when applying for or renewing a driver licence, or by contacting Waka Kotahi NZ Transport Agency.

As of 2016, Statistics New Zealand has the globally first official statistical standard for gender identity, which provides guidance for the collection, analysis and reporting of official statistics on gender identity. The current version of the standard was released in April 2021.

During the 2020 New Zealand general election, Newshub and Stuff reported that documents for individuals who want to register to vote (for the New Zealand 2020 elections) include a checkbox for the gender-neutral title Mx.

== Opposition ==
In 2024, Stephen Rainbow, who has allegedly held anti-trans views, was appointed as chief human rights commissioner. In 2024, a poll by the anti-trans organisation Family First New Zealand and surveyed by Curia Market Research showed a 62% majority support for banning puberty blockers in New Zealand.

In 2025, New Zealand prime minister Christopher Luxon said that the National party would consider a bill by New Zealand First to define gender as biological sex. He stated that he has been clear that "pregnant people, frankly, are women".

In September 2022, health advice stating that puberty blockers are safe and fully reversible was scrubbed from the Ministry of Health's webpage following backlash from anti-trans voices. Official correspondence from senior advisors within the MoH stated that the information was "no doubt true" but that the statement was removed regardless in order to create fewer queries from anti-trans campaigners.

The first recorded use of puberty blockers began in 2011 after the first guidelines were published. 48 children received puberty blockers in 2011. A 2024 study found that New Zealand prescribed up to seven times more GnRH agonists to adolescents aged 12 to 17 than England, Wales, Denmark and the Netherlands from 2014 to 2022, with 400 children receiving GnRH agonist treatment during that period. The study also showed that rates of prescribing GnRH agonists in New Zealand had fallen slightly since 2022, but still remained high. Due to data limitations, it was not possible to separate GnRH agonists prescribed as puberty blockers from those prescribed for other conditions.

== Legislation ==
During the first reading for the Statutes Amendment Bill (No 4) in April 2014, Louisa Wall submitted a Supplementary Order Paper requesting an amendment of s21(1)(a) of the Human Rights Act 1993 to include gender identity as a prohibited grounds of discrimination. Whilst it has been accepted by the government for several years that transgender people are already protected under the prohibition on sexual discrimination, Louisa Wall argued that the minor change would be a technical one to confirm and clarify this. This move was supported by Jan Logie.

In August 2021, Minister of Justice Kris Faafoi introduced the Conversion Practices Prohibition Legislation Bill to outlaw conversion therapy practices. The Bill passed its first reading and entered into the select committee stage on 5 August. The Bill subsequently passed its third and final reading on 15 February 2022, becoming law.

In November 2017, the New Zealand Parliament introduced the Births, Deaths, Marriages, and Relationships Registration Bill to allow people to change the sex on their birth certificates by statutory declaration, avoiding having to go through the Family Court or show evidence of medical treatment to change their sex. The Human Rights Commission has supported the bill on the grounds that it makes it easier for transgender and non-binary individuals to update sex details on birth certificates. The Bill passed its third reading on 9 December 2021 and received the Royal Assent on 15 December 2021. This law comes into effect in 2023.

== Summary table ==
Anti-discrimination laws in employment	Yes	Human Rights Act 1993 prohibits discrimination on the basis of sex, which transgender individuals are purportedly protected under.
Hate crimes laws covering gender identity	Yes / No	Legislation remains unclear, though transgender individuals are purportedly protected. Hostility towards a victim based on their gender identity is a statutory aggravating factor in sentencing.
Protection from discrimination on basis of health	Yes / No	Prohibitive costs and availability of surgery domestically
Right to change legal gender	Yes	Available for adults who have undergone "permanent medical changes", and youth who intend to do this, since 1993. Available for New Zealand-born people by statutory declaration from 2023. No mechanism in place for people born overseas after the removal of the family court process in 2023.
Right to change legal gender without having to end marriage	Yes	Since 2013

== See also ==
- LGBT rights in New Zealand
- Intersex rights in New Zealand
- The Inquiry into Discrimination Experienced by Transgender People
- Births, Deaths, Marriages, and Relationships Registration Bill
