= Births, Deaths, Marriages, and Relationships Registration Act 2021 =

Act of Parliament in New Zealand

Births, Deaths, Marriages and Relationships Registration Act 2021

New Zealand Parliament
- Royal assent: 15 December 2021
- Commenced: 15 June 2023

Legislative history
- Bill title: Births, Deaths, Marriages and Relationships Registration Bill
- Introduced by: Jan Tinetti
- First reading: 5 December 2017
- Second reading: 11 August 2021
- Third reading: 9 December 2021

Repeals
- Births, Deaths, Marriages, and Relationships Registration Act 1995
- Status: In force

The Births, Deaths, Marriages and Relationships Registration Act 2021 is a New Zealand act of parliament, which replaces the Births, Deaths, Marriages, and Relationships Registration Act 1995. It also implements several recommendations from the Law Commission's review of burial and cremation law, and makes it easier for people to change the sex on their birth certificates without having to go through the Family Court or show evidence of medical treatment to change their sex.

== Legislative features ==
The Births, Deaths, Marriages, and Relationships Registration Act repeals and replaces the Births, Deaths, Marriages, and Relationships Registration Act 1995. The act re-enacted the majority of the 1995 Act but also eliminates redundant provisions and makes a number of policy changes.

Key changes include:

- Allowing each parent who is notifying the birth of a child to specify whether they wish to appear on the child's birth certificate as the child's mother, father, or parent.
- Allowing an eligible person aged 18 and over to change their nominated sex by statutory declaration.
- Allowing an eligible person aged 16 or 17 to change their nominated sex by statutory declaration without the consent of their legal guardian, with a letter of recommendation from a suitable third party. The third party must have sufficient professional or community standing (they don't necessarily have to be a health professional) and have known the minor for a minimum amount of time (e.g. to prevent doctor shopping).
- Allowing the guardian of a child under 16 to change their child's nominated sex by statutory declaration. The application must be accompanied by letter of recommendation from a suitable third party.
- The nominated sex may be male, female, or another sex described in the regulations.
- The Registrar-General must register nominated sex if statutory requirements met.
- The eligible child must confirm registered sex on turning 18 years old.

== Legislative history ==
The bill passed its first reading on 5 December 2017 and was referred to the Governance and Administration Committee.

On 12 August 2021, the bill passed its second reading with support from all parties represented in the New Zealand Parliament.

The bill was unanimously approved by Parliament on its third reading on 9 December 2021. The bill received royal assent on 15 December 2021. The regulation-making powers came into force the following day. The remainder of the act, apart from three clauses, came into force no later than 15 June 2023. The three remaining clauses will come into force on 15 December 2024.

== Responses ==
On 10 August 2018, the Human Rights Commission welcomed the Government Administration Committee's efforts to make it easier for transgender and non-binary individuals to update sex details on birth certificates. The bill was also supported by the Māori Women's Welfare League and the National Council of Women of New Zealand.

In 2018, the feminist advocacy group Speak Up for Women was formed to oppose the sex self-identification clauses within the Births, Deaths, Marriages, and Relationships Registration Bill. The group has been criticised as transphobic by critics and faced difficulty in hosting meetings at municipal venues in Auckland, Palmerston North, Christchurch, Dunedin, Lower Hutt, and Wellington. In late June 2021, the High Court in Auckland ruled that Speak Up for Women was allowed to hold their meeting at an Auckland Council facility on the ground that it was not a hate group. The group's meetings in Nelson and Dunedin were picketed by transgender rights supporters.
