= Labour rights in New Zealand =

Labour rights in New Zealand are largely covered by both statute, particularly the Employment Relations Act 2000, and common law (including cases, judicial decisions and tribunal decision). The Ministry of Business, Innovation and Employment carries out most of the day to day administrative functions surrounding labour rights and their practical application in the state.

New Zealand is committed to a number of international institutions and treaties and is widely regarded as one of the world's pioneers in terms of enforcement of and protection of labour rights and obligations.

== Ministry of Business, Innovation and Employment ==
The Ministry of Business, Innovation and Employment (MBIE) was formed in 2012. The Ministry describes its primary role is to "Grow New Zealand for All".

In relation to employment, the Ministry aims to provide more jobs and to increase the number of opportunities for New Zealanders to participate in more productive and higher paid work. It does this through a large variety of mechanisms, previously administered by what was then the Department of Labour. Some of MBIE's major services include:

- Employment relations dispute resolution
- Conducting employment research
- Policy advice and analysis
- Providing the public with advice, information and resources regarding all employment matters
- Providing health & safety in employment information, inspections and administration

== Legislation ==
New Zealand labour law primarily stems from statutes enacted by the New Zealand Parliament. A large series of these statutes combine to form what is known as the minimum rights and entitlements. Each individual Act of Parliament attempts to either: address a different segment of labour rights and obligations entirely, or; may address a smaller portion of labour rights in the subsidiary to some other major legislative theme (for example as with the Privacy Act 2003).

=== Employment Relations Act 2000 ===
The Employment Relations Act 2000 (the "ER Act") is the most fundamental employment law statute in New Zealand. The ER Act repealed the Employment Contracts Act 1991 (the "ECA"). It enacts a number of core provisions on freedom of association, recognition and operation of unions, collective bargaining, collective agreements, individual employment agreements, employment relations education leave, strikes and lockouts, personal grievances, disputes, enforcement of employment agreements, the Mediation Service, the Employment Court, the Employment Relations Authority and labour inspectors.

Many of the key provisions apply once an employment relationship has begun. This includes a principal duty to act in good faith and to communicate openly. Other provisions operate on an ongoing basis irrespective of the employment relationship and are more declarative (as in the case of trade union operations), or administrative (as in the operation of the Employment Relations Authority) in nature.

==== Trade unions ====
Section 110 of the ER Act prohibits employers from discriminating against employees for their involvement (or non-involvement) in a union or other employees organisation. The ER Act acknowledges that there is an "inherent inequality of power in employment relationships" and promotes collective bargaining (Section 3) as a way of evening up the power disparity between employers and employees. It also "recognise(s) the role of unions in promoting their members' collective employment interests" in Section 12. Other important recognition's contained in the Act include:

- Part 4: Recognises the operation of unions generally;
- Part 5: Recognises the right to collective bargaining, and;
- Part 8: Recognises the right to strike.

===== Right to association =====
Under Part 3 of the ER Act trade unions in New Zealand have the right to association:

- (a) employees have the freedom to choose whether or not to form a union or be members of a union for the purpose of advancing their collective employment interests; and
- (b) no person may, in relation to employment issues, confer any preference or apply any undue influence, directly or indirectly, on another person because the other person is or is not a member of a union.

==== Employment Relations Authority ====
Under section 157 the Employment Relations Authority is defined as an investigative body that examines the facts of the case, as opposed to legal technicalities, in seeking to resolve problems with the parties' employment relationship.

=== Human Rights Act 1993 ===
The Human Rights Act 1993 expressly prohibits discrimination on certain stated grounds including sex, race, family status, political opinion and the like. It applies to almost all aspects of employment including job advertisement, application forms, interviews and job offers. It also applies to unpaid workers and independent contractors. The ERA expressly applies the HRA to employment matters.

==== Discrimination ====
Workplace discrimination is dealt with under the Human Rights Act 1993. Discrimination in employment can involve:

- Refusal or failure to offer and employee the same terms of employment, conditions of work, fringe benefits or opportunities as other employees with the same or similar qualifications, experience or skills working in the same or similar circumstances;
- Dismissal or detriment by the employer in circumstances in which other employees doing the same kind of work are not, or would not be, treated in such a way; and
- Retirement or being made to retire or resign by the employer

While the Act in New Zealand covers women, trans persons and discrimination based on cultural grounds a number of barriers still exist in practice in relation to persons who fall within these socio-economic groups. The findings from The Inquiry into Discrimination Experienced by Transgender People conduction by the Human Rights Commission in 2008 found that the majority of submissions made describing some form of discrimination focused on the area of employment. Four out of five submissions described examples of discrimination that ranged from harassment at work to vicious assault and sexual abuse. In 2010 the Centre for Applied Cross-cultural Research at Victoria University published a meta-analysis of all research relating to the experience of discrimination by Asian New Zealanders. The results found that Asian people experienced significant discrimination both working at and applying for jobs, and had higher rates of unemployment and under-employment than other ethnic groups.

If an employee has been unlawfully discriminated against during the course of employment they may pursue a person grievance under the ER Act through the MBIE or make a complaint under the Human Rights Act; however they cannot pursue both. If the discrimination occurs before employment, an individual can only pursue a complaint under the Human Rights Act.

It remains difficult to gauge the levels of workplace discrimination in New Zealand nationally due to inadequacies in data recording and reporting.

=== Other ===
Other important labour related legislation includes:

- Health and Safety at Work Act 2015: This Act requires employers and employees to take steps to maintain a safe work place;
- Holidays Act 1981: This Act sets out minimum entitlements and requirements with regards to annual holidays, public holidays and special leave;
- Parental Leave and Employment Protection Act 1987: sets out entitlements of employees to parental leave. It currently gives employees 22 weeks of government funded parental (maternity) leave. Employees may also take an additional extended leave for child care (up to 52 weeks' extended leave—less the number of weeks primary carer leave taken, up to 22 weeks). There is a presumption that the job will be kept open for the employee taking leave;
- The Accident Compensation Act 2001: sets out the no fault scheme in New Zealand whereby employees who suffer an injury at work have an entitlement to compensation from a state-funded insurance scheme. As a result of this scheme, employees are barred from a suit at common law for compensatory damages;
- New Zealand Bill of Rights Act 1990 (NZBORA): This statute is considered of fundamental constitutional importance. The seeks to affirm, protect and promote human rights and fundamental freedoms in New Zealand and to affirm New Zealand's commitment to the International Covenant on Civil and Political Rights. This Act expressly recognises a number of fundamental rights such as the freedom of association;
- Minimum Wage Act 1983: sets out the legal framework for New Zealand Employees to receive a minimum wage.
- Minimum Wage Order 2022: sets out the current minimum wage rates for employees, for the 2022 financial year.
- Privacy Act 1993: sets out various privacy principles including those on the collection, use and disclosure of personal information. Personal information includes information held about employees;
- The Equal Pay Act 1972: seeks to remove and prevent workplace discrimination, based on the sex of an employee.

== Minimum rights and entitlements ==
A number of rights and entitlements arise from the various employment enactments. Under New Zealand law, an employee cannot be asked to agree to less than the minimum rights and obligations as provided by the law. An employee must have a written agreement and the minimum employment rights must be met whether or not they are included in this agreement.

=== Minimum wage ===
The minimum wage rates apply to all employees and must be paid if a person is over 16 years of age and not a starting-out or trainee worker. The wage rates are reviewed annually by the government.

As at 8 September 2025, the minimum wage is set at $23.50 for adults and $18.80 for the starting-out and training rate.

=== Meal and rest breaks ===
Employers must keep an accurate record of an employee's time worked, payments, and holiday and leave entitlements. Employees are currently entitled to:

- One 10-minute paid rest break when they work between two and four hours
- One 10-minute paid rest break and one unpaid 30-minute meal break when they work more than four and up to six hours
- Two 10-minute paid rest breaks and one unpaid 30-minute meal break when they work more than six and up to eight hours

These requirements begin over again where the employee works more than eight hours. The legislation provides for breaks to be taken at times mutually agreed between the employer and employee. If there is no agreement, then the breaks must be evenly distributed throughout the work period.

=== Holidays and leave ===
Employees are entitled to four weeks' paid annual holiday leave at the end of each year of employment. New Zealand also has 11 annual public holidays and an employee is entitled to these days off work on pay, if they are days when the employee would normally work. Where an employee does work a public holiday, the employee must be paid at least time-and-a-half for the time worked and is also entitled to an alternative paid holiday. After 6 months of employment an employee is entitled to 5 days' sick leave on pay and paid bereavement leave. The entitlement varies from:

- Three days' leave on the death of a spouse/partner, parent, child, sibling, grandparent, grandchild, or spouse/partner's parent (That is, three days for each separate bereavement, even if they all occurred simultaneously.)
- One day if their employer accepts they have suffered a bereavement involving another person not included above.

Employees may also be entitled to paid and unpaid parental leave if they meet certain criteria. This paid leave is funded by the government, not employers.

== Common law ==
The second major source of New Zealand labour law is found in the common law (principles developed by Courts, judiciary, and Tribunals). In the case of conflict between the common and legislation, legislation takes priority. However, there have been a number of landmark decisions in NZ employment law.

In 2003, New Zealand decriminalised sex work with the introduction of the Prostitution Reform Act 2003. Following this, in DML v Montgomery and M & T Enterprises Ltd the plaintiff alleged that the owner of a brothel at which she worked had sexually harassed her, causing humiliation, loss of dignity, and injury to her feelings. The Human Rights Review Tribunal found in her favour and awarded the plaintiff NZD $25,000; issued a declaration and a restraining order (to prevent a continuing breach); and ordered that the brothel's management staff undergo training to understand why sexual harassment is unacceptable.

In Talleys Fisheries Ltd v Lewis the New Zealand High Court found that a female employee had been the victim of gender-discrimination where her major employer Talleys Fisheries had segregated women into work which was paid less than a substantially similar position which was performed by men.

In Ministry of Health v Atkinson and Ors, parents who were caring for family members with disabilities challenged the Ministry of Health's policy of not paying them as discrimination by reason of family status. The tribunal agreed that it was discriminatory and that it could not be justified under section 5 of the NZBORA.

== International obligations ==
NZ has ratified a number of human rights treaties containing obligations that pertain to domestic labour rights and obligations. NZ has also been a strong supporter of the International Labour Organization (ILO) and has ratified the following 6 of 8 fundamental ILO Conventions:

- Forced Labour Convention, 1938 (No. 29)
- Right to Organise and Collective Bargaining Convention, 2003 (No. 98)
- Equal Remuneration Convention, 1983 (No. 100)
- Abolition of Forced Labour Convention, 1957 (No. 105)
- Discrimination (Employment and Occupation) Convention, 1983 (No. 11)
- Worst Forms of Child Labour Convention, 1999 (No. 182)

New Zealand has expressed no intention of ratifying either the Freedom of Association and Protection of the Right to Organise Convention, (no. 87), and the Minimum Age for Admission to Employment Convention, (No. 138) though is currently exploring the option to. New Zealand is also a ratifying party to a number of other labour-relevant international treaties. The treaties and the reservations made against each article contained in them are as follows:

- International Covenant on Economic, Social and Cultural Rights (ICESCR): Article 8 on trade unions. The reservation on 10(2) relating to parental leave was withdrawn in 2003;
- International Covenant on Civil and Political Rights (ICCPR): Article 22 on trade unions and the declaration under Article 41;
- Convention on the Rights of the Child (UNCROC): General reservation and articles 32(2), on the minimum age of employment;
- Convention on the Elimination of All Forms of Discrimination Against Women (CEDAW): The reservation against the recruitment or service of women in armed combat or situations of violence was withdrawn in relation to NZ in 2008.

== Human Rights Commission Report 2010 ==
The Human Rights Commission periodically releases an intensive report documenting human rights in New Zealand, mapping how they are being "promoted, protected and implemented". Of the thirty 'priority areas for action on human rights' released in the 2010 report, three were workplace and employment related. These included:

- Implementing a new framework for equal opportunities that addresses access to decent work for disadvantaged groups such as Maori, Pacific youth and disabled people
- Timetabling pay and employment-equity implementation with a minimum target of halving the gender pay gap by 2014 and eliminating it by 2020
- Addressing barriers to the employment of migrant workers and ensuring the rights of temporary, seasonal and rural workers and those on work-to-residence visas are respected

=== Māori and Pasifika rights ===
Barriers to employment and promotion and equal employment opportunities continue to be one of the major issues facing Māori and Pacific peoples across the full range of occupations. The Ministry of Development's Social Report 2010 assessed the social and economic wellbeing of New Zealanders across a range of indicators. It found higher rates of unemployment for young people, Māori, Pacific peoples and other ethnic groups, and lower rates of median hourly earnings for the same groups as compare with Pakeha/European groups. This was in line with findings from previous years. The report also found that 14 per cent of the population live in low-income households. Since 2001, the annual Social Report, published by the Ministry of Social Development, has charted improvements in unemployment and employment rates and outcomes for Māori in socio-economic outcomes for Māori. Despite these improvements, average outcomes for Māori tend to be poorer than for the total population and the median hourly earnings, occupational spread, representation in senior roles and workplace injury claims. Despite improvements over the last decade, these gaps have widened due to the economic recession that began in late 2008. Unemployment rates in particular have risen, and are higher for Māori than for non-Māori. Māori youth unemployment rates stand as one of the highest figures of any group in New Zealand, sitting at 30.3 per cent in June 2010.

=== Disabled rights ===
New Zealand has ratified the Convention on the Rights of Persons with Disabilities. Currently, disabled people, though being protected by a number of domestic statutes (for example the Human Rights Act and NZBORA), are considered one of the most disadvantaged groups in New Zealand when it comes to the right to work, and barriers to employment such as gaining interviews. This was reflected in figures released in 2006 showing the New Zealand labour force participation rate for disabled people was 45 per cent, compared with 77 per cent for non-disabled people.

=== Gender rights ===
Despite having pioneered a number of rights issues in the international sphere, in 2010 the United Nations Human Rights Committee raised concern about the low representation of women in high-level and managerial positions and on boards of private enterprises with respect to compliance with arts 2, 3 and 26 of the ICCPR. It was recommended the state seek ways to encourage women participation in these roles including through enhanced cooperation and dialogue with partners in the private sector. Although the part-time employment rate in New Zealand has almost doubled for men since 1986, women continue to have a higher part-time employment rate than men (23.1 per cent and 8.7 per cent, respectively). There was also pervasive inequality found between men and women in the sharing of power and decision-making at all levels. The current mechanisms in place were considered insufficient at all levels to address the advancement of women and the gender pay gap was criticised with average median levels of difference sitting at 10.6%.

=== Immigrant rights ===
Immigration in New Zealand is governed by the Immigration Act 2009. While, New Zealand generally complies with and exceeds international standards in terms of its legislation and policies where it regards race relations, barriers to employment and promotion continue to be one of the major issues facing migrants and refugees living in New Zealand. The Human Rights Commission cited that plight of migrant workers in New Zealand has received extensive mainstream media coverage on a range of issues including discrimination, exploitation and battles over work and entry visas.

== OECD guidelines ==
The Organisation for Economic Co-operation and Development (OECD) Guidelines for Multinational Enterprises are recommendations on responsible business conduct that have been adopted by governments in the OECD (and some outside it). New Zealand joined the OECD in 1973 and became a signatory to the guidelines when they were first adopted by the OECD in 1976.

The guidelines allow unions and other non-governmental organisations to hold multinational companies accountable for their behaviour. The guidelines cover a range of topics including: disclosure; human rights; employment and industrial relations. Although the guidelines are non-binding, they offer an opportunity to "name and shame" and to threaten the reputation of poorly behaving multinationals.

Governments that have signed the guidelines are required to set up a National Contact Point to promote them. In New Zealand the National Contact Point is the Ministry of Business, Innovation and Employment. The National Contact Point is required to consider any allegations of a breach of the guidelines by a multinational company headquartered in a signatory nation.
