= Te Huirangi Waikerepuru =

New Zealand trade unionist and Māori language activist (1929–2020)

Huirangi Waikerepuru CNZM
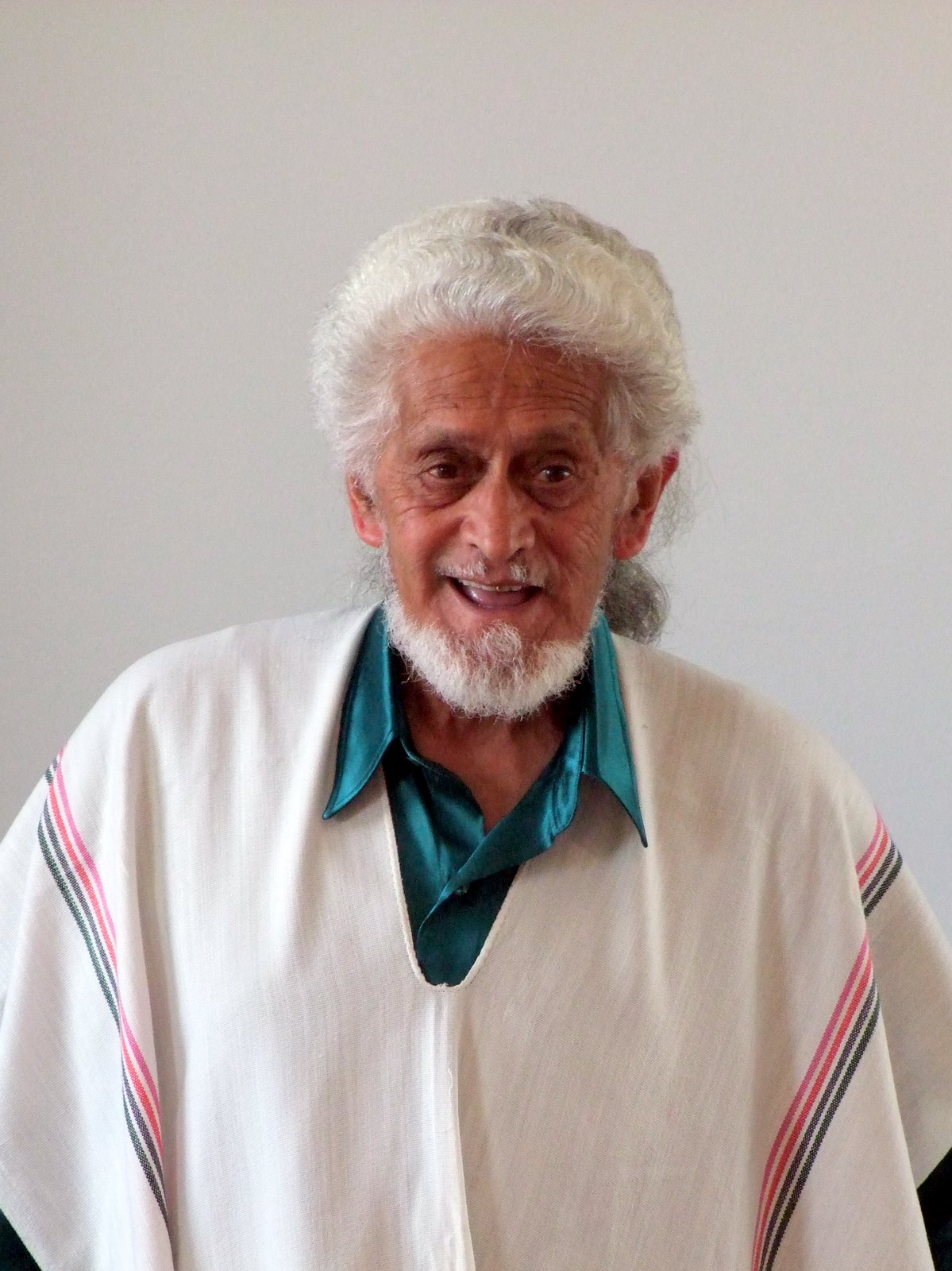
- Te Huirangi Waikerepuru
- Born: 1 April 1929; New Plymouth, New Zealand
- Died: 8 April 2020 (aged 91); Palmerston North, New Zealand
- Known for: Establishment of Māori-language broadcasting

Huirangi Eruera Waikerepuru CNZM (1 April 1929 – 8 April 2020) was a New Zealand Māori language activist and trade unionist of Taranaki and Ngāpuhi descent. He was active in the foundation and governance of Māori language radio and television.

== Life and career ==
Waikerepuru was a key figure in the creation of Ngā Kaiwhakapūmau i te Reo Māori (the Wellington Māori Language Board). The board lodged a claim with the Waitangi Tribunal in 1984 to make Māori an official language of New Zealand. In 1986, the tribunal recommended that the language be acknowledged as a taonga (treasure) under Article II of the Treaty of Waitangi. This led to the claim being passed into law with the Māori Language Act 1987, which made Māori an official language, and set up Te Taura Whiri i Te Reo Māori (the Māori Language Commission).

The board went on to establish the Māori-language radio station Te Upoko o te Ika in 1988, which helped establish contemporary Māori broadcasting in New Zealand.

Waikerepuru had a 30-year relationship with the Tertiary Education Union and predecessors, which represents academic and general staff in universities and polytechnics.

Waikerepuru died in Palmerston North on 8 April 2020, aged 91.

== Honours ==
In 1995, Waikerepuru was awarded an Honorary Doctorate from the University of Waikato. In the 2014 Queen's Birthday Honours, he was appointed a Companion of the New Zealand Order of Merit, for services to Māori.
