= The Inquiry into Discrimination Experienced by Transgender People =

The Human Rights Commission (Te Kāhui Tika Tangata) is New Zealand’s national human rights institution. It was formed in 1977 under the Human Rights Act 1993. The Inquiry into Discrimination Experienced by Transgender People (He Purongo mō te Uiuitanga mō Aukatitanga e Pāngia ana e ngā Tāngata Whakawhitiira) was carried out in 2006, and reported on in 2008 (The Inquiry).

Lesbian, gay, bisexual and transgender (LGBT) people in New Zealand enjoy the majority of the same rights as others. The exceptions to this are the right to adopt children as a couple and the right to marry. While New Zealand does not have anti-discrimination laws specific to transgender, the laws that do exist are thought to cover members of the trans communities. The Human Rights Act 1993 outlaws discrimination on the grounds of sexuality.

The Report of the Inquiry into Discrimination Experienced by Transgender People was a world first by a national human rights institution and focused on three areas: trans people’s experience with health care access, everyday interactions and community participation. There is very little information about the number of trans people in New Zealand; and those numbers that do exist are suggested to significantly underestimate the size of the trans population.

== Terminology used ==
The Inquiry recognised that both gender identity and its expression can vary significantly and as such, the report adopted ‘trans’ as a generic term. Other terms that can be used include the following:

- Whakawahine, Hinehi, Hinehua: Māori terms for someone born with a male body who has a female gender identity
- Tangata ira tane: a Māori term for someone born with a female body who has a male gender identity.
- Transgender: a person whose gender is different from their assigned gender at birth.
- Genderqueer: people who do not conform to traditional gender norms.
- Intersex: a variety of conditions in which a person is born with reproductive or sexual anatomy that does not seem to fit the typical biological definitions of male / female.

== Health care access ==
It was found that trans people face difficulties when accessing the same general health services as other individuals. The three main difficulties presented were, firstly, gaps both in knowledge and services and, secondly, the cost. The third finding was the difficulty for trans people to be treated with dignity and respect throughout the process.

The health care system was found to have “major gaps in the availability, accessibility, acceptability and quality of medical services”. A lack of information creates barriers for trans people: without ‘clear treatment pathways’, there is a significant gap in the current provision of health care for trans people. The Inquiry noted that there was a high degree of consistency between trans people and health professionals about the issues affecting trans people's access to health services. Quality of care is inherently reduced unless health professionals have access to information specific to trans people.

Confusion and difficulties surrounding the cost of health care for trans people also presented significant challenges; while the cost of hormone treatment or gender reassignment surgery varied, it was accepted that the cost is often prohibitive.

The Inquiry suggests that the biggest gains for trans people in the short to medium term may be through better support in primary health care, and have subsequently begun discussions with the Ministry of Health.

== Socially ==
=== At school ===
A gender identity that is not congruent with one's body can lead to feelings of insecurity and vulnerability, one that can be exacerbated during youth. Trans children and young people are faced with the challenge of being dependent on others (such as parents, caregivers and teachers) to protect their human rights and to ensure that they have role models and support. While schools have a responsibility to provide a safe environment where students are able to learn, the Inquiry heard from stakeholder groups (such as the Council of Trade Unions and the Post-Primary Teachers’ Association) “who noted the importance of initiative to improve the safety of trans students.

=== At work ===
Employment was also an issue that was brought to the Inquiry. The key concerns were access to employment, job retention, workplace safety and promotion. “The incidence of discrimination faced by trans people is high. Four out of five submissions described examples of discrimination that ranged from harassment at work to vicious assault and sexual abuse.”

=== At home ===
Another common difficulty faced was regarding access to housing; trans people spoke about experiencing discrimination when looking at housing (most of this feedback was received in relation to renting).

In addition to this, daily challenges included access to public toilets which often posed issues for trans people; while public places must be accessible to all who wish to use them, ensuring fair and manageable access to everyone requires a balance of interests. “Inability to access public toilets had a major, daily impact.”

== Community participation ==
The Inquiry found that an issue for trans people often centres around official documentation; “documents that accord with a trans person’s gender identity affirm their dignity and secure participation as equal citizens.” While a case has been submitted for trans people to be able to obtain documents that reflect their gender identity, the Inquiry states, “the process for changing sex details on official documents should be simplified to reflect the reality.”

The Inquiry considers that the current law provides an adequate framework both for trans people to assert their rights to privacy of personal information and for agencies holding such information to respect these rights. However, inconsistencies in practice and the importance of these issues to trans people indicate that it would be useful to have resources that dealt specifically with how current laws apply to personal information about them.

== Recommendations ==
- The Inquiry considers that trans people would have clearer legal protection from discrimination if section 21(1)(a) of the Human Rights Act 1993 should be amended to clearly state gender identity.
- Enable effective participation by trans people in decisions that affect them
- Reduce discrimination and marginalisation experienced by trans people
- Improving trans people's access to public health services and developing treatment pathways and standards of care for gender reassignment services
- Simplify the requirements for changing sex details on a birth certificate, a passport and other documents to ensure consistency with the HRA
- Consider the specific human rights issues facing intersex people

== Conclusion of the Inquiry ==
The implementation of the recommendations of the Report of the Inquiry are necessary to ensure that trans people and their families enjoy the same rights as other people in New Zealand.

“The international human rights framework applies to everyone by virtue of their common humanity. Trans people are, therefore, entitled to respect for and protection and promotion of their human rights on the same basis as everyone else.”

The HRC has a continuing role to play in implementing the Transgender Inquiry to galvanise the impetus for change that has been generated. The Commission's specific role includes providing human rights education on issues for trans people and facilitating dialogues.

== Since the Inquiry ==
The focus is now on implementing the Inquiry's recommendations and other suggested actions. This requires work by the Human Rights Commission, government agencies, trans people and the wider community.

Counties Manukau District Health Board CMDHB was funded to manage a small national project looking at Gender Reassignment Health Services for transgender people in New Zealand. On 1 August 2011 the project's good practice guide for health professionals was published on the Ministry of Health's website.

== See also ==
- Transgender rights in New Zealand
- Intersex rights in New Zealand
