= Gender pay gap in New Zealand =

The gender pay gap in New Zealand is the difference in the median hourly wages of men and women in New Zealand. In 2020 the gender pay gap is 9.5%. It is an economic indicator used to measure pay equality. The gender pay gap is an official statistic published annually by Stats NZ sourced from the Household Labour Force Survey.

Until 1960, separate pay rates for men and women doing the same work were legal in both the public and private sectors. Now there is legislation prohibiting sex discrimination in employment. The Government Service Equal Pay Act 1960 abolished gender-based pay scales in the public service and in 1972 this was extended to the private sector in the Equal Pay Act. The Human Rights Act (1993) and the Employment Relations Act 2000 prohibit sex discrimination in all aspects of employment, including pay. New Zealand is signatory to international agreements with the International Labour Organization and Convention on the Elimination of All Forms of Discrimination Against Women that prohibit sex discrimination in employment. By international comparisons New Zealand is moderately placed on global pay equality indexes. There is a larger difference in the pay gap between men and women from Māori and Pacific ethnicities than those with European ethnicities. Two main sources of New Zealand's gender pay gap have been suggested: women are often clustered in lower paid occupations (occupational segregation) and women are under-represented in higher-level and managerial positions.

As an economic indicator of gender inequality, a gender gap does not validate the claim of failure to ensure the principles of pay equality and equal pay for equal work. There is no standard international gender pay gap measure. The gender wage gap, published by the OECD, provides international comparison. It is calculated using the median hourly wage paid to full-time male and female workers. The New Zealand gender pay gap includes part-time and full-time workers to include the approximately 30 percent of women working less than 30 paid hours per week.

== Legislation ==
=== Equal Pay Act 1972 ===
Until 1960, separate pay rates for men and women doing the same work were legal in both the public and private sectors. This changed with the introduction of the Government Service Equal Pay Act 1960, which abolished gender-based pay scales in the public service. In 1972, the Equal Pay Act (EPA) extended the principle of pay equity to the private sector. Under the EPA, if work, or a class of work, requires the same, or substantially similar, degrees of skill, effort and responsibility of its male and female employees, yet pays them different rates, that difference in pay is deemed to be gender-based, and illegal. If a class of work is exclusively or predominantly performed by females, gender-based pay inequality is deemed to exist if a different rate would be paid to male employees with the same, or similar, skills performing the work under substantially similar conditions and with substantially similar degrees of effort.

==== Equal Pay Amendment Bill 2025 ====
An amendment to the Equal Pay Act 1972, The Pay Equity Amendment Bill, was introduced by the Minister for Workplace Relations and Safety, Brooke Van Velden. The bill was passed on Wednesday 7 May 2025 after being put through under urgency. Urgency in New Zealand Government process allows for faster passing of law with no select committee stage. The amendment means the cancellation of 33 pay equity claims that were in process which affects teachers, social workers, nurses and healthcare workers. Opposition to the bill has come from many people and groups.

=== Human Rights Act 1993 ===
The Human Rights Act 1993 (HRA) expressly prohibits discrimination on thirteen grounds, including sex. The HRA applies to all aspects of employment, including remuneration. If an employee feels that they have been unlawfully discriminated against in the course of their employment they can make a complaint to the Human Rights Review Tribunal. As defined by the Ministry of Business, Innovation and Employment (MBIE), sex-based employment discrimination exists when an employer refuses, or fails to offer an employee the same terms, conditions, benefits or opportunities as other employees with the same or similar qualifications, experience or skills working in the same or similar circumstances, but of the opposite gender.

=== Other legislation ===
- The Employment Relations Act 2000 prohibits discrimination on the grounds of sex, and grants the Employment Court jurisdiction over employment disputes.
- The State Sector Act 1988 and the Crown Entities Act 2004 impose an obligation on public sector employers to be 'good employers'. This includes an obligation to provide equal employment opportunity programmes aimed at eliminating policies and procedures that cause inequality.

== International obligations ==
In addition to its domestic legal framework, New Zealand has ratified several international instruments concerned with pay equality.

=== International Labour Organisation Conventions ===
New Zealand is a party to the International Labour Organisation (ILO) Convention concerning Equal Remuneration for Men and Women Workers of Equal Value (ILO 100). Art 2(1) provides:

Each member shall… ensure the application to all workers of the principle of equal remuneration for men and women workers for work of equal value.

New Zealand has also ratified the ILO Convention concerning Discrimination in Respect of Employment and Occupation (ILO 111), which provides:

Each Member… undertakes to declare and pursue a national policy designed to promote… equality of opportunity and treatment in respect of employment and occupation, with a view to eliminating any discrimination in respect thereof.

=== Convention on the Elimination of all forms of Discrimination Against Women ===
New Zealand ratified the Convention on the Elimination of All Forms of Discrimination Against Women (CEDAW) in 1985. Article 11 provides that states must take appropriate measures to eliminate employment discrimination, including ensuring the right to equal remuneration, and equal treatment for work of equal value.

=== Other international obligations ===
- Article 23(2) of the Universal Declaration of Human Rights provides that everyone, without discrimination, has the right to equal pay for equal work.
- Article 7 of the International Covenant on Economic, Social and Cultural Rights secures women's right to conditions not inferior to those enjoyed by men, including equal pay for equal work.

== Research ==
Research into the causes of the New Zealand gender pay gap finds that up to 80 percent is unexplained by measurable effects such as educational differences, occupation, age or family. Unexplained difference includes differences in men's and women's choices and behaviours, conscious and unconscious bias. The unexplained portion of the pay gap is larger for women with higher wages. Motherhood is an important factor in New Zealand's gender pay gap. Sin et al. (2018) found that women on average experience a 4.4 percent decrease in hourly wages returning to work as mothers. For mothers returning after 12 months, the average decrease is 8.3 percent.

== Gender pay gap ==
Although the Equal Pay Act made different pay rates illegal, New Zealand has a persistent pay gap. In 2011 the Human Rights Commission (HRC) described it as "a systemic and enduring inequality for women." From 2000 to 2008 the gender pay gap consistently sat between 12 and 14%. Since 2009 it has reduced steadily, and in 2018 stood at 9.2%. Internationally, New Zealand is moderately placed on global pay equality indexes. In 2014, it was 33rd of 142 countries in the World Economic Forum Global Gender Gap Report rankings of wage equality for similar work.

In New Zealand, the gender pay gap coexists with an ethnic one. In 2011, the Human Rights Commission found that while the difference between the median hourly wage of a European male and European female was 12.4%, between a European male and a Pacific woman it was 24.4%.

Several sources of New Zealand's gender pay gap have been suggested:

=== Occupational segregation ===
47% of female workers are in occupations where 80% or more of the employees are women. MBIE notes that: "Women are often clustered in a narrow range of occupations… The skills and knowledge that women bring to the work in female-dominated occupations may not be recognised and therefore not valued appropriately in comparison to other jobs."

A 2011 report by Goldman Sachs noted that female-dominated areas tend to be social services oriented, meaning that employee outputs are more difficult to measure. This creates a risk of systemic undervaluation. The risk of undervaluation posed by occupational segregation was recognised by the UN Human Rights Council Working Group in the 2009 and 2014 Universal Periodic Review of New Zealand. The 2014 Review included recommendations that New Zealand review its equal pay legislation, with a focus on addressing the issue of systemic undervaluation of women's work, and minimizing the link between the pay gap and ethnicity.

==== Cases concerning occupational segregation ====
===== Clerical Administrative v Farmers Trading =====
In 1986, the New Zealand Clerical Workers Union brought a case under the Equal Pay Act arguing that the wages being paid to clerical workers were lower than those being paid for work of equal value, such as that of builders, and that this difference existed because over 90% of clerks were female, whereas the majority of builders were male. The application was rejected on the basis that the EPA was limited to ensuring equal pay between male and female employees within the same sector. Comparison across sectors for the purpose of identifying systemic undervaluation was deemed to fall outside the scope of the EPA.

In response to the case, the Department of Labour commissioned a study on wage equality. It concluded that there was still a substantial gender pay gap in New Zealand, and that occupational segregation was one of its main sources. The report led to the enactment of the Employment Equity Act 1990, which contained provisions on both pay equity and equal opportunity. However, after a change in government from the Labour Party to the National Party in the 1990 New Zealand election, the Employment Equity Act was repealed.

The ILO Committee of Experts on the Application of Conventions and Recommendations has criticised Farmers Trading, saying that its interpretation of the EPA failed to give legislative effect to the principle of equal remuneration.

===== Terranova Homes & Care Limited v Service and Food Workers Union Nga Ringa Tota Incorporated| Terranova v Bartlett =====
Ms Bartlett was a caregiver at a rest home, an occupation in which 92% of workers are female. She claimed that even though she was paid the same wage as her male colleagues, both her and their pay rate was artificially low because of the predominance of female workers in the caregiving sector. Reversing the decision in Farmers Trading, the Court of Appeal of New Zealand held that wage comparisons between female and male-dominated sectors can be made under the Equal Pay Act in order to determine whether systematic undervaluation is occurring in female-dominated occupations. The Court stated:"A rate of pay that is depressed because of sex-based undervaluation of the work is not a rate in which there is no element of sex-based differentiation."

The case has been received as a positive development in human rights and employment law. Employment lawyer John Goddard states that the EPA was widely considered to be inadequate for ensuring true pay equality, but that in light of Terranova this must now be reconsidered. Lorraine Skiffington said the case is “the first significant step towards realizing the social justice that was envisaged by the architects of the [Equal Pay] Act… It decisively deals with the narrow ‘self-defeating’ comparisons that have perpetuated pay and employment inequalities in the past.”

=== Equal opportunities for women ===
The under-representation of women in higher-level and managerial positions is also given as a reason for the gender pay gap. In the public sector, women make up 59% of the workforce but only 24% of the chief executives. In the private sector, the Human Rights Commission found in 2012 that among the top 100 companies listed on the New Zealand Stock Exchange, only three have female chief executives. The New Zealand Law Society states that while 46.3% of practicing certificates held by lawyers in law firms in 2013 were held by women, only 19.8% of partners or directors in those firms were women.

== Possible reform ==
In 2011, the HRC issued its report Tracking Equality at Work, containing a draft replacement of the EPA called the Pay Equality Bill. Unlike the EPA, the Pay Equality Bill shifts the onus of proving pay equality from the employee to employer. Instead of requiring a finding of pay discrimination, the Pay Equality Bill establishes a positive right to pay equality which must be satisfied by employers. As at April 2015, the Pay Equality Bill had not yet been considered for enactment.

In September 2019, Westpac New Zealand voluntarily disclosed its 30.3% gender pay gap and aimed for equal men and women in management roles. In December 2018 the Minister for Women announced a flexible work scheme in New Zealand to reduce the gender pay gap which is supposed to be implemented by the end of 2020. In September 2020 the NZ Statistics agency published the gender pay gap figure as 9.5%, and now more corporate companies are applying for the New Zealand Based Accreditation Gender Tick. Gender Tick is an initiative from the YWCA and to earn the accreditation companies must have a safe and inclusive culture, flexible working arrangements and equal pay.

The New Zealand Ministry for Women/ Manatū Wāhine publishes 'What's my GPG?' which breaks down gender pay gaps by dimensions such as region, ethnicity and age. It links to a list of public service gender pay gaps.

In 2025, the New Zealand Ministry for Women/ Manatū Wāhine reported a decrease in the gender pay gap from 8.2% in June 2024 ro 5.2% in June 2025, while noting that the gender pay gap is much higher when considering Wāhine Māori, Pacific Islander, non-White, and disabled women.

== See also ==
- Gender equality in New Zealand
- Gender pay gap in Australia
- Gender pay gap in the United States
