= Structural discrimination in New Zealand =

Structural discrimination (also known as structural inequality, systemic discrimination, and institutional racism) occurs in a society "when an entire network of rules and practices disadvantages less empowered groups while serving at the same time to advantage the dominant group".

The Human Rights Commission in New Zealand have asserted that there is strong, consistent evidence that structural discrimination is a real and ongoing issue in the country. The commission has acknowledged the importance of addressing institutional barriers within New Zealand's social institutions, stating that these barriers help to create social inequalities which in turn limit the access to and fulfillment of New Zealand's human rights obligations.

In the New Zealand Department of Social Welfare's (1988) Report, Puao-te-Ata-tu, it was noted that structural discrimination is "the most insidious and destructive form of racism." The Report found that the negative effects of structural discrimination were wide reaching and inter-generational and primarily disadvantaged New Zealand's most vulnerable groups. Joris de Bres, New Zealand's Race Relations Commissioner from 2002 to 2013, stated that the systems and processes in New Zealand public services are not sufficiently sensitive to the diversity of its population. He argued that addressing structural discrimination is vitally important for New Zealand as currently structural disadvantage is being perpetuated with Māori, Pasifika, and ethnic minorities not getting equal outcomes through their access and interaction with public service bodies.

== Legislative context ==
At a domestic level human rights in New Zealand are primarily contained in the Human Rights Act 1993 (HRA) and New Zealand Bill of Rights Act 1990 (NZBORA). Structural Discrimination is not given a definition in the domestic legislation; however, under the HRA (following the NZBORA non-discrimination standard) it is unlawful to discriminate on the grounds of race, colour, ethnicity or national origin, with this including both direct and indirect discrimination. Structural discrimination can be considered a form of indirect discrimination as it occurs when an action, omission, or policy that appears to treat everyone in the same manner, actually creates negative effects unfairly impacting a particular group.

Human rights are also protected at an international level with New Zealand having ratified numerous international human rights treaties. Under Article 2(1)(c) of the Convention on the Elimination of All Forms of Racial Discrimination (CERD) it is stated that, "each State party shall take effective measures to review governmental, national and local policies, and to amend, rescind or nullify any laws and regulations which have the effect of creating or perpetuating racial discrimination wherever it exists." As is affirmed by Geiringer and Palmer, this brings about positive obligations on the State to address matters of structural discrimination, meaning that a State must, "ensure that formal rights and entitlements are extended without discrimination", by looking to, "eliminate structural inequalities and actual social and economic disparities."

The Treaty of Waitangi is another key legislative document to acknowledge when discussing structural discrimination in New Zealand. Despite the well documented translation disagreements and lack of higher protective status of the Treaty in a domestic constitutional context, it is well recognised that the Treaty's articles concern recognition of rights and responsibilities which are necessary considerations when looking to address structural discrimination. The Human Rights Commission found in its (2010) Report, 'Human Rights and the Treaty of Waitangi', that, "the guarantee of equal rights promised in the Treaty remains unfulfilled today, as systemic disadvantage remains to be fully addressed."

== Social context ==
Overall, New Zealand's positive human rights record is well acknowledged and documented. Carlos Vazquez, Country Rapporteur for New Zealand for the CERD Committee (2013) Report, stated that 'the human rights situation in New Zealand was very positive and that remaining challenges were being addressed.' He noted that New Zealand had implemented most of the recommendations made during the last review and that there were many examples of best practices which would be recommended to other countries. These sentiments were echoed in New Zealand's dealings with the United Nations Universal Periodic Review (UPR) process. In 2014 the reviewing body, "recognised the high realisation of human rights in New Zealand and commended the Government on its ongoing commitment to improve the realisation of rights for all people in Aotearoa New Zealand." However, like any nation New Zealand has a specific set of human rights difficulties which arise because of the nation's history and the subsequent development of social policy.

Several United Nations human rights monitoring bodies have expressed their concern about inequalities in New Zealand, and have suggested several ways to address these, including acknowledgment and reduction of structural discrimination. The CERD Committee (2013) Report stated that despite several positive steps being taken to address the issue of structural discrimination in New Zealand, they were concerned that the problem remained. The Committee welcomed New Zealand's, "recognition that structural discrimination in the State party is partly responsible for the persistent poor outcomes that the members of the Māori and Pasifika communities experience", and that, "the Committee recommends that the State party intensify its efforts to improve the outcomes of the Māori and Pasifika in the fields of employment, health and in the administration of criminal justice by, inter alia, addressing the existing structural discrimination in the State party." In 2012, the United Nations Committee on Economic, social and cultural rights recommended that the New Zealand Government, "strengthen its efforts aimed at eliminating the disadvantages faced by Māori and Pasifika in the enjoyment of economic, social and cultural rights by addressing structural factors."

== Effects ==
In the Human Rights Commission's (2010) annual review of race relations, 'Tui Tui Tuituia Race Relations', it was stated that structural discrimination and the institutional barriers it creates affect the full spectrum of human rights including, "civil, political, social and economic rights." When examining the effects of structural discrimination it can be seen that the Pākehā majority in New Zealand, "have better outcomes on nearly every socio-economic indicator, but they have also accumulated inter-generational benefits over time that concentrate and sustain ethnic differences in wealth, power and other indicators of wellbeing." The effects of structural discrimination are cumulative with disadvantages crossing both public institutions and generations. It is an unfortunate reality that in New Zealand there is no equality in access to rights to health, education, and justice due to a various socio-economic obstacles, including structural discrimination. As is acknowledged by the Human Rights Commission, "although frequent citation of negative statistics about inequality can have the unintentional impact of further perpetuating negative messages about Māori and Pacific communities, statistics do provide an evidence base for analysing structural discrimination and encouraging government action."

=== Health ===
Article 12 of the International Covenant on Economic, Social and Cultural Rights (ICESCR) states that everyone has the right to enjoy the highest attainable standard of physical and mental health. However, a vast amount of research into structural discrimination within the country's health institutions has found that "significant and deep-seated ethnic disparities in health and well-being continue to afflict New Zealand". For example, research suggests that, "pacific peoples turn up for GP appointments at higher rates than the general New Zealander population, but experience worse outcomes and receive fewer referrals, despite statistically having a higher burden of disease." It has also been found that structural discrimination in health care institutions has been associated with lower odds of breast and cervical cancer screening among Māori women, as well as negative patient experiences for all participants.

=== Education ===
Article 26 of the Universal Declaration of Human Rights (UDHR) states that everyone has the right to an education and that education shall be directed to the full development of the human personality. In New Zealand, continual ethnic inequalities in the education institutions have been linked to structural discrimination. Research shows that approximately 50 per cent of Māori students leave school without any educational qualifications, compared to 21 per cent of the overall New Zealand population. It is argued that some institutional approaches look at Māori and Pacific students as the problem instead of examining the structures and systems as the main contributors to educational inequity.

In a discussion paper on educational structural discrimination a New Zealand school principal gives a pertinent analogy between a colouring book and "the normalised nature of dominant culture world views and practices in education systems". Mainstream schools are described as unacknowledged Eurocentric "white spaces" where a set of rules and practices dictate "whose knowledge is important, what success looks like, what achievement matters, how the space is organised and who has the power". Such institutionalised disadvantage starts at an early age with barriers in early childhood education then contributing to lower levels of higher educational achievement.

=== Justice ===
Article 26 of the International Covenant on Civil and Political Rights (ICCPR) states that all persons are equal before the law and are entitled without any discrimination to the equal protection of the law. However the Human Rights Commission has stated that the differences in convictions and sentencing for Māori and non-Māori illustrate evidence of structural discrimination and unconscious bias within the justice system sentencing process. This can is furthered by statistics relating to imprisonment. Ethnic minorities make up a disproportionately high percentage of prisoners despite their low percentage of the population. To explain this research suggests that there are two forms of structural discrimination that exist within the justice system in New Zealand. The first of these is based upon the inherent nature of the New Zealand justice system. This system features a lack of engagement with the affected minorities in policy creation and implementation and demonstrates a lack of cultural sensitivity. The second relates to practice within the system. There is evidence of bias at different points throughout the system from arrests to sentencing.

== Government responses ==
=== Inaction and inclusion ===
The Robson Hanan Trust concluded that despite the overwhelming evidence that structural discrimination exists in New Zealand, there has been a historical reluctance on the part of successive governments to address this key issue. The Human Rights Commission has affirmed that, "inaction is a form of structural discrimination," and have stated that, "where government services do not respond to the specific needs of ethnic groups, the absence of initiatives perpetuates barriers." It has been noted by several influential bodies within New Zealand and through international human rights monitoring that inaction has been a leading contributing factor in restricting New Zealand's progress in eliminating structural discrimination and upholding all of New Zealand's international human rights obligations as such.

Public institutions may not have knowledge of the disadvantages and disparities their discriminatory systems and procedures are creating, but an ignorance of "these unconscious practices serves to perpetuate disadvantage." This is best exemplified in the fact that academics have identified a specialised form of structural discrimination that has developed in New Zealand which provides for "inclusion in principle, through use of encompassing and inclusive speech," but is coupled, "with a resource-based exclusion supporting disparity in fact." Despite this, New Zealand has made some positive steps towards addressing the problem it has with structural discrimination. For example, following recommendations made by an ICESCR Committee in 2012 to address structural discrimination in public institutions, Iwi (Tribes) and the police have developed several strategies aimed at reducing victimisation among Māori. Regretfully Amnesty International Aotearoa New Zealand have found that, "similar strategies to address institutional bias are yet to be developed across all public service sectors, including health, education and justice."

=== Future directions ===
Disparities in the enjoyment of human rights remain a complex issue in New Zealand. When looking at the Waitangi Tribunal's 2011 report 'Ko Aotearoa Tenei' the Human Rights Commission has stated that drawing on diverse cultural values and practices to inform more responsive social services that cater to the needs of different communities is a central part of addressing structural discrimination. The commission has also stated that they support the recommendation made by the UN Committee Economic, Social and Cultural Rights to address structural discrimination that the Government set specific equality targets by year and closely monitor the achievement of these. They go on to conclude that a failure to address the causes of New Zealand's socio-economic inequities is itself a form of structural discrimination and that the continuing gap in socio-economic indicators between ethnic groups underscores the need to tackle structural sources of inequality. As such the Commission suggest that a comprehensive policy approach should take into account and seek to address both structural barriers to equality and embedded social and economic factors.

== See also ==
- Gender inequality in New Zealand

== Sources ==
- Human Rights Commission (2012). "A fair go for all? Rite tahi tätou katoa? Addressing Structural Discrimination in Public Services" (PDF).
