= Human Rights (Women in Armed Forces) Amendment Act 2007 =

Act of Parliament in New Zealand

New Zealand Parliament
- Royal assent: 4 May 2007
- Commenced: 5 May 2007

Legislative history
- Introduced by: Lynne Pillay
- Passed: 3 May 2007
- Status: Current legislation

The Human Rights (Women in Armed Forces) Amendment Act 2007 is an Act of Parliament passed in New Zealand in 2007. It removed an exemption from the Human Rights Act 1993 which barred women from serving in combat roles in the New Zealand Defence Force.

== Background ==
When New Zealand ratified the Convention on the Elimination of All Forms of Discrimination Against Women (CEDAW) in 1985, it reserved the right not to apply the Convention insofar as it conflicted with existing policies prohibiting women from taking up combat roles in the military. The policy was reflected in the Human Rights Act 1993 with a clause exempting the armed forces from the prohibition against discrimination on the basis of gender in regards to combat roles. The policy against women serving in combat was formally rescinded by the NZDF in 2000, but the exemption remained on the statute books as a barrier to full ratification of the CEDAW.

== Introduction and passage ==
The Human Rights (Women in Armed Forces) Amendment Bill was first entered into the member's bill ballot by Labour MP Lynne Pillay on 4 May 2006. It was subsequently drawn on 24 August and introduced to the House. The bill passed its first reading unanimously on 6 September 2006 and was referred to the Foreign Affairs, Defence and Trade Committee.

On 15 December 2006 the Committee recommended it proceed with minor technical amendments to the bill. The bill was subsequently adopted by the government in March 2007 in order to ensure its passage before New Zealand's periodic report to the Committee on the Elimination of Discrimination against Women later that year. It was passed through its later stages unanimously, and passed its third reading on 3 May 2007.
