= Disability rights in New Zealand =

Disability rights are not specifically addressed by legislation in New Zealand. Instead, disability rights are addressed through human rights legislation. Human rights in New Zealand are protected by the New Zealand Bill of Rights Act 1990 (NZ BORA) and the Human Rights Act 1993. New Zealand also signed and ratified the United Nations Convention on the Rights of Persons with Disabilities (CRPD) in 2008.

== International obligations ==
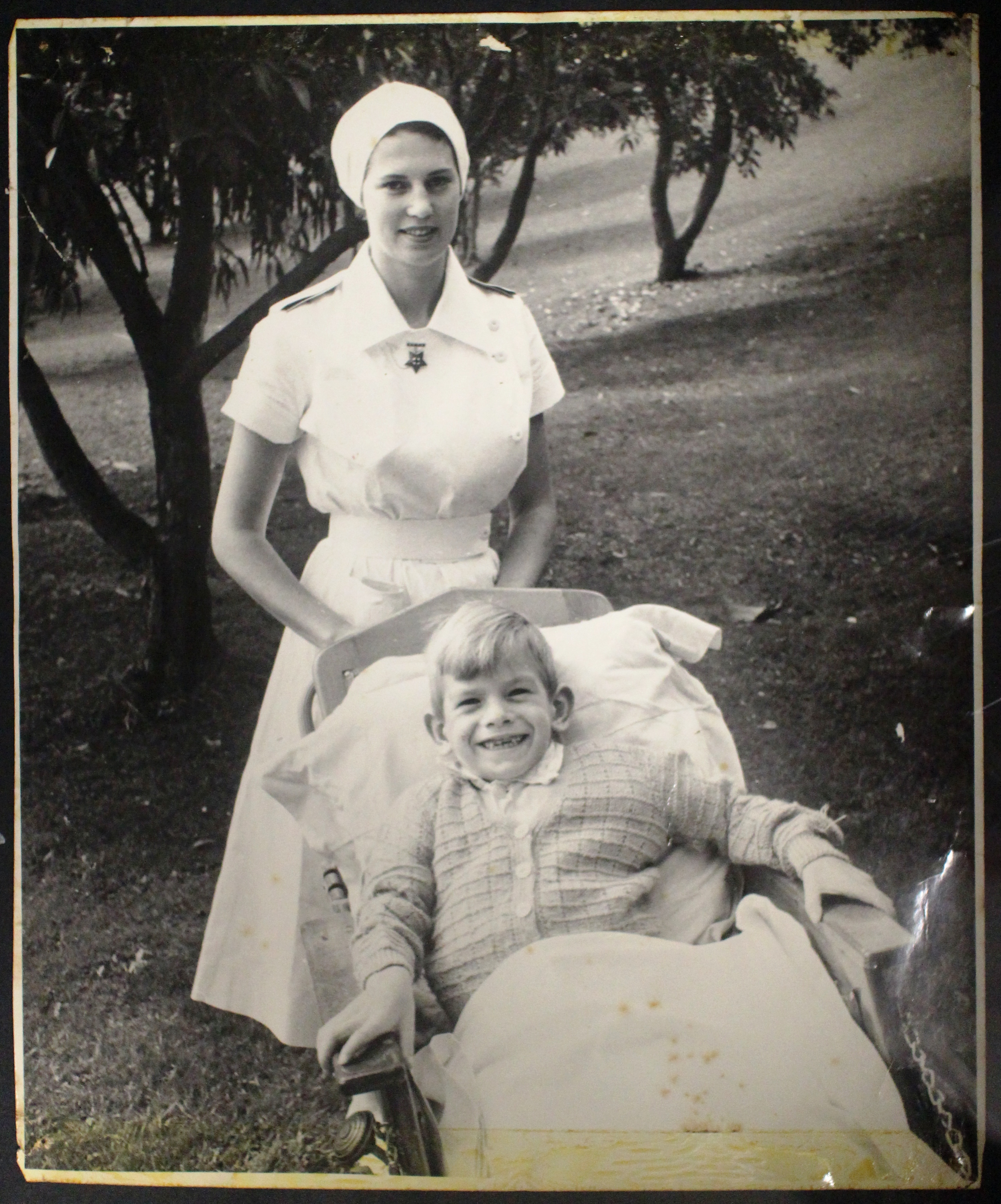
Wilson's Home, Auckland

=== The Universal Declaration of Human Rights ===
New Zealand became a member of the United Nations on October 24, 1945, and was a signatory in the Universal Declaration of Human Rights. Article 1 of the Universal Declaration says that all human beings are born free and equal with dignity and rights. The Declaration became the standard in judging government conduct in relations to human rights. Although the Declaration started out as having only moral and political authority, unable to create legal obligations like the International Covenant on Civil and Political Rights (ICCPR) and the International Covenant on Economic, Social and Cultural Rights (ICESCR), its principles are now widely recognised. Today, the Declaration has attained a legal force as being part of the customary law of nations, including New Zealand. In addition, The Declaration has become the authority in interpreting human rights provisions of the United Nations Charter, binding all members.

=== Convention on the Rights of Persons with Disabilities ===
The United Nations assumed the Universal Declaration would be enough in protecting everyone. However, the 650 million people in the world with disabilities, representing 10 percent of the world population, lack opportunities available to the mainstream population. People with disabilities face many physical and social obstacles that prevent them from exercising many of their rights. Therefore, a convention that deals with disability and the rights of people with disabilities was necessary.

The United Nations Convention on the Rights of Persons with Disabilities is the international standard for rights of the people with disabilities. New Zealand ratified the Convention in 2008 and therefore has a legal obligation to respect, promote, and fulfill the rights provided in the convention. The convention is aimed at protecting the dignity of people with disabilities and ensuring that they are treated fairly and equally under the law. It provides these individuals with a voice, visibility, and legitimacy as equal human beings in New Zealand and around the world. Although the Convention does not create new rights or entitlements, it expresses existing rights in a way that address the needs and situations of people with disabilities. New Zealand ratified the Optional Protocol to the CRPD on 4 October 2016.

== National legislation ==
=== The New Zealand Bill of Rights Act 1990 ===
The New Zealand Bill of Rights Act 1990 (NZ BORA) aimed to affirm, protect and promote human rights and fundamental freedoms in New Zealand. In addition, the NZ BORA affirms New Zealand's commitment to the ICCPR and provides the right to be free from disability discrimination on the grounds stated in the Human Rights Act 1993. Despite propositions that the NZ BORA has obtained 'constitutional status', it is not supreme law, and it can still be overridden by Acts of the Parliament.

=== The Human Rights Act 1993 ===
Section 21(1)(h) of the Act makes discrimination based on disability, without lawful justification, unlawful. Section 21(1)(h) of the act defines disability as:

1. Physical disability or impairment
2. Physical illness
3. Psychiatric illness
4. Intellectual or psychological disability or impairment
5. Any other loss or abnormality of psychological, physiological, or anatomical structure or function
6. Reliance on a guide dog, wheelchair, or other remedial means
7. The presence in the body of organisms capable of causing illness (such as HIV or hepatitis)

=== New Zealand Public Health and Disability Act 2000 ===
This Act introduced a major change to the public funding and provision of personal health services, public health services and disability support services and established new publicly-owned health and disability organisations. The responsibilities of the Minister of the Crown include creating a strategy to provide disability support services, and overall improve the services available to individuals with disabilities.

== Disability rights issues in New Zealand ==
=== Unlawful discrimination ===
Discrimination happens when a person is treated unfairly or less-favourably than other people in the same or similar circumstances. Discrimination can also occur against the relatives and associates of the people with disabilities. Discrimination is only unlawful if it happens in one of the areas of activity set out in the Act, including employment, education, or government activity. The New Zealand Human Rights Commission provided a formula to help determine whether an activity or a practice amounts to unlawful discrimination. The following components must be present for the discrimination to be unlawful:

- Ground + area + disadvantage + absence of exception or justification = unlawful discrimination.

=== Lawful discrimination ===
Lawful justifications of discrimination based on disability exist as well. In relation to employment, a person with a disability can be treated differently if they can not perform duties without the help of special services that are unreasonable to expect from the employer. In addition, if the environment where duties are performed poses an unreasonable risk to the person with disability or to those around them, including the risk of infecting others with an illness, then this is considered a lawful justification for discrimination as well. However, a justification will not be lawful if the duties can be performed with some adjustment of activities by the employer that does not involve unreasonable disruption.

New Zealand law allows for immigrants to be denied citizenship if they would require expensive treatment from the public healthcare. Immigrant and disability rights activists in New Zealand oppose these immigration laws as "ableist" and "discriminatory".

=== Indirect discrimination ===
The Human Rights Act also protects people from both direct and indirect discrimination. 'Indirect discrimination' describes the situation where an apparently neutral practice or condition has a disproportionate, negative impact on one of the groups against whom it is unlawful to discriminate, and the practice or condition cannot be justified objectively. People with disabilities are specifically susceptible to indirect discrimination. For example, indirect discrimination takes place against people who use wheelchairs if the only way to get to a store is by climbing the stairs.

== Disability protections and awareness initiatives ==
=== Equal suffrage and by ballot ===
The NZ BORA gives a person with disability equal right to vote by secret ballot. For this to take place, the individual must be over 18 years old and obtain a New Zealand citizenship or permanent residency. However, he or she can be denied this right in some contexts. For example, a person with disability is disqualified from voting if they have been detained for three or more years for a criminal offense. In addition, the right to a secret ballot can be compromised when the voter has visual impairment or has difficulty interpreting and reading the ballot. The individual would need assistance in placing their vote, therefore disclosing their preference to another person.

The Political Participation for Everyone Report found that New Zealand's voting and political systems were not designed for everyone, specifically at disadvantage are those with disability. It found that people with disabilities have experienced hurdles in exercising their right to vote and right to participate in political and public life. These hurdles included inaccessible information and voting papers and a lack of physical facilities where people with disabilities can engage with politicians.

On September 20, 2014, New Zealand introduced voting by telephone. For this reason, The United Nations commended the country on its Concluding Observations for enabling people with disabilities to vote.

=== General accessibility ===
The Human Rights Commission claims that New Zealand is a fully inclusive society that recognises and values people with disability as equal participants. The needs of these individuals are considered integral to the social and economic order and not identified as "special". A full inclusion requires a barrier-free physical and social environment. The Better Design and Buildings for Everyone: Disabled People's Rights and the Built Environment Report 2012 found that New Zealand's built environment is rarely designed in considerations of all users. This particularly excludes people with disabilities, approximately 17 to 20 percent of New Zealand's population, from using and accessing facilities and services like buildings, parks and recreation facilities.

=== Access to information ===
The Better Information for Everyone: Disabled People's Rights in the Information Age Report found that information is not accessible to a wide range of people with disabilities. Human rights depend on the accessibility of information, products and services. New Zealand information and communications were found to have often been designed for one kind of end user: an individual who is internet-literate, can see and read in English competently, and lacks learning disabilities.

=== Making a complaint ===
The commission is an independent Crown entity responsible for administering the Human Rights Act 1993 and monitoring the Convention on the Rights of Persons with Disabilities. An individual can make a complaint to the Human Rights Commission if they feel that their human rights have been breached. A complaint can be made in sign language with interpreters available. In addition, the commission offers free and confidential services. It can advise complainants on whether the complaint is covered by the Human Rights Act and if the commission can help through mediation. If mediation does not work, advice can be given on possible legal options.

The commission also developed guidelines for using disability rights language as a practical tool when referring to people with disability. However, the word-choice can reflect attitudes toward people with disability. Because of this, the Commission suggested to use people-centred language that recognises a person with disability is, first and foremost, a person. In their view, this is one of the many ways New Zealand can promote and respect the dignity of people with disability in accordance with the Disability Convention.

=== Recognition of people with disabilities ===
The International Day of Persons with Disabilities first started in 1992 and it is celebrated yearly on December 3. The United Nations promotes this day across the world to encourage a better understanding of disability issues. Each year has a different theme. For example, the theme for 2015 was "Inclusion matters: access and empowerment for people of all abilities", which aimed at ensuring that people with disabilities are empowered to create and use opportunity. At this event, thousands of bright orange wristbands with "Inclusion Matters" written on them were sent out to organisations throughout New Zealand for the day of celebration and acknowledgement. The government of New Zealand believes that by wearing the wristband, "you are calling for the inclusion of disabled people into all areas of life."
