= Human rights in New Zealand =

Human rights in New Zealand are addressed in the various documents which make up the constitution of the country. Specifically, the two main laws which protect human rights are the New Zealand Human Rights Act 1993 and the New Zealand Bill of Rights Act 1990. In addition, New Zealand has also ratified numerous international United Nations treaties. The 2009 Human Rights Report by the United States Department of State noted that the government generally respected the rights of individuals, but voiced concerns regarding the social status of the indigenous population.

== History ==
Universal suffrage for Māori men over 21 was granted in 1867, and extended to European males in 1879. In 1893, New Zealand was the first self-governing nation to grant universal suffrage; however, women were not eligible to stand for parliament until 1919.

A distinctive feature of New Zealand's electoral system is a form of special representation for Māori in parliament. Initially considered a temporary solution on its creation in 1867, this separate system has survived debate as to its appropriateness and effectiveness. Critics have described special representation as a form of apartheid. In 1992, when the Royal Commission on the Electoral System recommended the abolishment of the separate system, strong representations from Māori organisations resulted in its survival.

Human rights in New Zealand are addressed in the constitution. In addition, New Zealand has also ratified numerous international treaties as part of the United Nations. The 2009 Human Rights Report by the United States Department of State noted that the government generally respected the rights of individuals, but voiced concerns regarding the social status of the indigenous population.

In May 2009, for the first time New Zealand prepared a national Universal Periodic Review (UPR) at the United Nations Human Rights Council in Geneva, Switzerland. During this peer review process many countries praised New Zealand's human rights record and identified that the perception of New Zealand as a comparatively fair and equal society is crucial to its international reputation. Areas where the nation was directed to make improvements include disparities experienced by Māori as demonstrated by key social and economic indicators and the extent of family violence and violence against women and children.

== International treaties ==
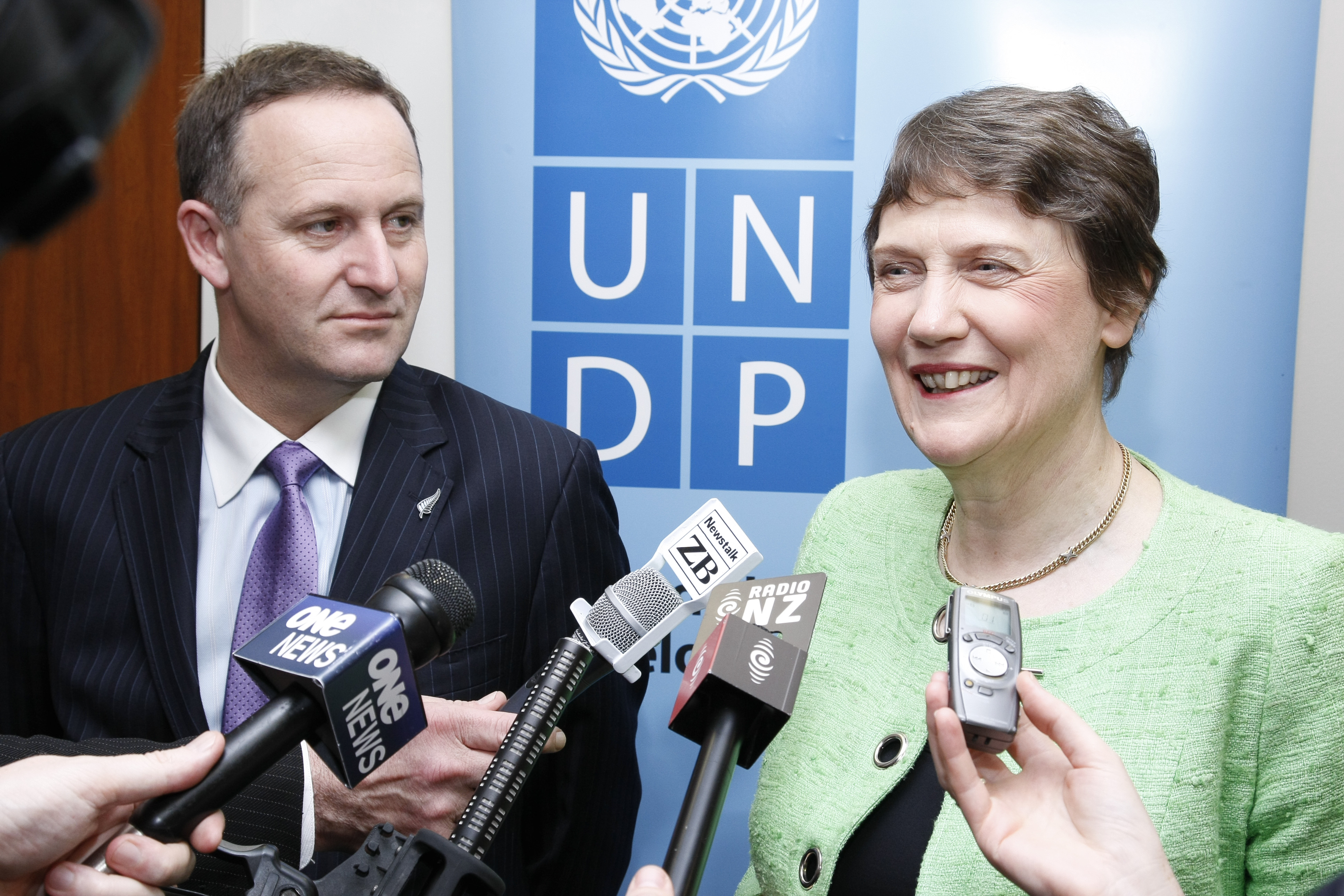
John Key and Helen Clark at the UNDP headquarters.

Having joined the United Nations in 1945, New Zealand has ratified seven of the nine core key human rights treaties, namely ICERD, ICCPR, ICESCR, CEDAW, CRC, CAT and CRPD.

In 2009 New Zealand was seeking a position on the United Nations Human Rights Council. The bid was withdrawn in March of that year to allow a clear path for the United States to win the seat, after US President Barack Obama reversed his country's previous position that the council had lost its credibility. Then New Zealand Foreign Minister Murray McCully stated "We believe that US membership of the council will strengthen it and make it more effective... By any objective measure, membership of the council by the US is more likely to create positive changes more quickly than we could have hoped to achieve them."

In May 2009, for the first time New Zealand prepared a national Universal Periodic Review (UPR) at the United Nations Human Rights Council in Geneva, Switzerland. During this peer review process many countries praised New Zealand's human rights record and identified that the perception of New Zealand as a comparatively fair and equal society is crucial to its international reputation. Areas where the nation was directed to make improvements include disparities experienced by Māori as demonstrated by key social and economic indicators and the extent of family violence and violence against women and children.

Treaty	Signed (Note: Unless otherwise indicated, the declarations and reservations were made upon ratification, accession or succession)	Ratified
Convention on the Elimination of All Forms of Racial Discrimination	25 October 1966	22 November 1972
International Covenant on Civil and Political Rights	12 November 1968	28 December 1978
Convention on the Elimination of All Forms of Discrimination against Women	17 July 1980	10 January 1985
Convention on the Rights of the Child (Note: The instrument of ratification also specifies that "such ratification shall extend to Tokelau only upon notification to the Secretary-General of the United Nations of such extension")	1 October 1990	6 April 1993
Convention against Torture and Other Cruel Inhuman or Degrading Treatment or Punishment	14 January 1986	10 December 1989
International Covenant on Economic, Social and Cultural Rights	12 November 1968	28 December 1978
Convention on the Rights of Persons with Disabilities	30 March 2007	25 September 2008

== Legal system ==
The legal system takes the framework of a parliamentary representative democratic monarchy. In the absence of a single constitution, various legislative documents such as the Constitution Act 1986, Imperial Laws Application Act 1988, New Zealand Bill of Rights Act 1990 and the Human Rights Act 1993 have been implemented to cover such areas.

Human rights in New Zealand have never been protected by any single constitutional document or legislation, and no single institution has been primarily responsible for enforcement. Because New Zealand's human rights obligations are not entrenched and are simply part of common law, Parliament can simply ignore them if it chooses. The Human Rights Commission has identified this constitutional arrangement as an area in need of action to identify opportunities for giving greater effect to human rights protections.

=== Section 7 reports ===
Section 7 of the Bill of Rights Act requires the Attorney-General to draw to the attention of Parliament the introduction of any Bill that is inconsistent with the Act. The Ministry of Justice, which prepares this advice for the Attorney-General, requires a minimum of two weeks to review the draft legislation. Here is a list of bills reported by the Attorney General as being inconsistent with the New Zealand Bill of Rights Act 1990.

=== Different perspectives ===
The 2009 report by the U.S. Department of State noted that, "[t]he law provides for an independent judiciary, and the government generally respected judicial independence in practice". In recent years concerns have been expressed that New Zealand is not performing as well in regard to human rights as it used to. A study released in 2015, Fault Lines: Human rights in New Zealand said New Zealand's human rights legislation – the Bill of Rights Act and the Human Rights Act – "were problematic and didn't prevent the passing of other laws, which breach rights".

== Civil liberties ==
=== Freedom of speech ===
The right to freedom of speech is not explicitly protected by common law in New Zealand but is encompassed in a wide range of doctrines aimed at protecting free speech. An independent press, an effective judiciary, and a functioning democratic political system combine to ensure freedom of speech and of the press. In particular, freedom of expression is preserved in section 14 of the New Zealand Bill of Rights Act 1990 (BORA) which states that:

"Everyone has the right to freedom of expression, including the right to seek, receive, and impart information and opinions of any kind in any form".

This provision reflects the more detailed one in Article 19 of the ICCPR. The significance of this right and its importance to democracy has been emphasised by the New Zealand courts. It has been described as the primary right without which the rule of law cannot effectively operate. The right is not only the cornerstone of democracy; it also guarantees the self-fulfilment of its members by advancing knowledge and revealing truth. As such, the right has been given a wide interpretation. The Court of Appeal has said that section 14 is "as wide as human thought and imagination". Freedom of expression embraces free speech, a free press, transmission and receipt of ideas and information, freedom of expression in art, and the right to silence. The right to freedom of expression also extends to the right to seek access to official records. This is provided for in the Official Information Act 1982.

==== Limitations ====
There are limitations on this right, as with all other rights contained in BORA.

It would not be in society's interests to allow freedom of expression to become a licence irresponsibly to ignore or discount other rights and freedoms.

Under article 19(3) ICCPR, freedom of expression can be limited in order to:

- respect the rights and reputations of others; and
- protect national security, public order, or public health and morals.

Jurisprudence under BORA closely follows these grounds. Freedom of expression is restricted only so far as is necessary to protect a countervailing right or interest. The Court of Appeal has held that the restriction on free speech must be proportionate to the objective sought to be achieved; the restriction must be rationally connected to the objective; and the restriction must impair the right to freedom to the least possible amount. The right to freedom of expression may also be limited by societal values which are not in BORA, such as the right to privacy and the right to reputation.

Hate speech is prohibited in New Zealand under the Human Rights Act 1993 under sections 61 and 131. These sections give effect to article 20 ICCPR. These sections and their predecessors have rarely been used. They require the consent of the Attorney-General to prosecute. Incitement to racial disharmony has been a criminal offence since the enactment of the Race Relations Act 1971. Complaints about racial disharmony often concern statements made publicly about Māori-Pākehā relations and immigration, and comments made by politicians or other public figures regarding minority communities.

Blasphemous libel was previously a crime in New Zealand under the Crimes Act 1961 but has since been repealed under the Crimes Amendment Act 2019.

==== Freedom of the media ====
Freedom of the media is also recognised as an important democratic principle. New Zealand is ranked eighth on the Press Freedom Index 2010 and there tends to be strong legal, public and media comment where this right is infringed. Section 68 of the Evidence Act 2006 provides a qualified form of privilege for journalists who wish to protect the identity of their sources. The Court of Appeal has also laid down guidelines for the police when searching media premises for law enforcement reasons, so that their sources remain protected.

The Courts may order that publication of information be withheld in whole or part, in the interests of justice. Often this is to protect the right to a fair trial, to protect the interests of the parties, or to uphold public confidence in the integrity of the justice system. It is not uncommon for New Zealand Courts to suppress names and evidence in civil and criminal proceedings so as to protect the right to a fair trial.

"The law of New Zealand must recognise that in cases where the commencement of criminal proceedings is highly likely the Court has inherent jurisdiction to prevent the risk of contempt of Court by granting an injunction. But the freedom of the press and other media is not to be interfered with lightly and it must be shown that there is a real likelihood of a publication of material that will seriously prejudice the fairness of the trial".

The Broadcasting Act 1989 is a statute limiting the media's right to freedom of expression. Broadcasters have a responsibility to maintain programme standards that are consistent with: the observation of good taste and decency, the maintenance of law and order, the privacy of the individual, the principle of balance when controversial issues of public importance are discussed, and approved code of broadcasting practice applying to programmes. The Broadcasting Standards Authority is a Crown entity that hears complaints from the public where codes of practice have been breached. Print news media are self-regulated through the Press Council.

=== Right to a fair trial ===
A fair trial in New Zealand has been defined as "a court hearing that is procedurally just to both parties"; it is all encompassing for every citizen in New Zealand, and is pinnacle in the functionality of the justice system. The area this civil and criminal right has the most influence in is criminal procedures, however it still holds great influence in other realms of New Zealand law, such as administration law (due to the use of the Rule of Law). This essential right has been in practice from the early beginnings of New Zealand due to the continuation of English Law during its colonisation, and has continued to develop over the years with the international community.

==== Magna Carta ====
Magna Carta (1215) is seen as one of the earlier instruments to clearly set out the rights to a fair trial to all free men. It is applicable to New Zealand law due to it being listed in the Imperial Laws Application Act 1988, which allows a handful of English Statutes to be legally binding.

The important clause is Clause 39:

"No free man shall be seized or imprisoned, or stripped of his rights or possessions, or outlawed or exiled, or deprived of his standing in any other way, nor will we proceed with force against him, or send others to do so, except by the lawful judgement of his equals or by the law of the land".

It was found to have paved the way for trial by jury, equality before the law, habeas corpus and a ban on arbitrary imprisonment; all rights that are within the shadow of the right to a fair trial.

==== Rule of law ====
The rule of law, found in every democratic society including New Zealand, is essentially the authority the law has on every citizen, regardless of their status. It has been defined as a doctrine that holds the law above all citizens in an equal manner, and even government officials are accountable to the ordinary courts of law.

The rule of law is a source of the right to a fair trial, as the doctrine protects the process of the court and national equality when considering the application of the law.

==== International covenants recognised by New Zealand ====
The International Covenant on Civil and Political Rights is the main international treaty which lays out the right to a fair trial. Article 14(1) says:

"All persons shall be equal before the courts and tribunals. In the determination of any criminal charge against him, or of his rights and obligations in a suit at law, everyone shall be entitled to a fair and public hearing by a competent, independent and impartial tribunal established by law. The press and the public may be excluded from all or part of a trial for reasons of morals, public order or national security in a democratic society, or when the interest of the private lives of the parties so requires, or to the extent strictly necessary in the opinion of the court in special circumstances where publicity would prejudice the interests of justice; but any judgement rendered in a criminal case or in a suit at law shall be made public except where the interest of juvenile persons otherwise requires or the proceedings concern matrimonial disputes or the guardianship of children"

New Zealand has also made a commitment to uphold the Universal Declaration of Human Rights (UDHR) and support the efforts of the Office of the United Nations High Commissioner for Human Rights (OHCHR), and has put in place the Human Rights Commission (Te Kahui Tangata) to ensure this.

In regards to the right to a fair trial, article 10 of the UDHR states:

"Everyone is entitled in full equality to a fair and public hearing by an independent and impartial tribunal, in the determination of his rights and obligations and of any criminal charge against him".

===== New Zealand Bill of Rights Act 1990 =====
It is thought that New Zealand passed the Bill of Rights Act to fulfil its obligations to the International Convention of Civil and Political Rights (ICCPR), as a state party, section 25 of this Act essential replicates Article 14 of the ICCPR.

"Section 25 Minimum of Criminal Procedure Everyone who is charged with an offence has, in relation to the determination of the charge, the following minimum rights: (a)the right to a fair and public hearing by an independent and impartial court: (b)the right to be tried without undue delay: (c)the right to be presumed innocent until proved guilty according to law: (d)the right not to be compelled to be a witness or to confess guilt: (e)the right to be present at the trial and to present a defence: (f)the right to examine the witnesses for the prosecution and to obtain the attendance and examination of witnesses for the defence under the same conditions as the prosecution: (g)the right, if convicted of an offence in respect of which the penalty has been varied between the commission of the offence and sentencing, to the benefit of the lesser penalty: (h)the right, if convicted of the offence, to appeal according to law to a higher court against the conviction or against the sentence or against both: (i)the right, in the case of a child, to be dealt with in a manner that takes account of the child's age".

===== Criminal Procedure Act 2011 =====
Although the Criminal Procedure Act 2011 does not initially set out the right to a fair trial, it can however be seen that the right to a fair trial is the key reason behind particular actions.

The following table lists some of the sections, where the right to a fair trial is essential for the courts to consider.

Section	Contents	The link to Fair Trial
s18	Court ordering further particulars.	The court must be satisfied that it is necessary for a fair trial.
s197	The power to clear the court.	For a court to be cleared the court must be satisfied that there is "a real risk of prejudice to a fair trial".
s200	The suppression of the defendant's identity.	For suppression of the defendant's identity to occur, the court must be satisfied that the publication of the name would "create a real risk of prejudice to a fair trial".
s202	The suppression of the identities of any witnesses, victims, and connected persons.	The court may only do this if the court is satisfied that the publication of the identity would be likely to "create a real risk of prejudice to a fair trial".
s205	The suppression of evidence and submissions.	Suppression may only occur when the court is satisfied that the publication would "create a real risk of prejudice to a fair trial".
s232	Appeals	Appeals must be accepted when there has been any miscarriage of justice, which may include a result that is seen as an unfair trial.

==== Right to a fair trial and the media ====
Aside from the limits of sections 4, 5 and 6 of the Bill of Rights, and New Zealand's "unwritten" constitution, other rights may impede on the right to a fair trial where one right can overrule another. The best example is the relationship between freedom of speech and the right to a fair trial. These two rights are always conflicting, due to the nature of the media.

In New Zealand, there is a focus on finding a balance between the contrasting rights; courts focus on a balance between one person's right and another's. Although there is nothing expressly stating a hierarchy of rights, the court does in fact have the ability to limit one right so as to uphold another. In New Zealand there is full recognition of the importance of freedom of speech. However, it has been seen in numerous occasions, court have upheld the right to a fair trial over the freedom of speech through media.

It has been said that in the event of a conflict, if all other things are equal between the two rights, the right to fair trial should prevail. However it has been argued that greater tolerance should be given to freedom of speech when the issue involves something of "substantial public interest". Overall, the freedom of the press and of speech is not a right to be lightly interfered with, and when interference happens it must be seen as a justified limitation, but also, if publication was to occur regarding the case, serious prejudice would arise.

=== Freedom of religion ===
Freedom of religion is addressed specifically in the New Zealand Bill of Rights Act 1990, and the government has generally respected this in practice.

=== Political rights ===
New Zealand is a parliamentary democracy, and as such acquires rights generally associated with such a system. Democratic rights include electoral rights, the right for citizens to take part (directly or indirectly) in government, and the right to equal access to the public service. There is an associated duty of responsible citizenship, or being willing to play one's part in public affairs and to respect the rights and freedoms of others. These rights give the ability to participate in both public and political life when considered together.

==== Constitution ====
Political and democratic rights are purported to be upheld by the 'unwritten' Constitution of New Zealand. One of the many sources that make up the constitution is the New Zealand Bill of Rights Act 1990. This legislation was the first aspect of the New Zealand constitution to specially refer to the International Covenant on Civil and Political Rights (ICCPR) with the rights contained within. Together with the New Zealand Human Rights Act 1993, these two statutes make up a basis for Human Rights protection in New Zealand. They were not incorporated directly into the legal system, however many of the rights within the ICCPR were replicated in the Bill of Rights Act 1990. These include electoral rights under section 12, and freedom of association under section 17. The Human Rights Act 1993 also concerns non-discrimination based on political opinion under section 21.

There has been concern expressed that due to the nature of the New Zealand constitution, and the lack of full integration into the legal system, rights under the ICCPR are not sufficiently protected. The Bill of Rights Act 1990 is not entrenched legislation, and this means that it can effectively be overturned by a simple majority in Parliament. A counter to this concern is that rights do exist in the New Zealand constitution regardless; however it is the finding of them that is the difficult part.

==== Electoral rights ====
Electoral rights include the right to vote in Members of Parliament, and the right to run for the House of Representatives. This is done by way of a secret ballot, and there is universal suffrage, with voting rights given to both men and women of the age 18 and over who are New Zealand citizens or permanent residents. Freedom of association allows people to join with other individuals into groups that express, promote, pursue and defend common interests collectively. The Electoral Act 1993 is also important because it is one of the few 'constitutional' documents to contain entrenched provisions.

These maintain the rights to voting and the size of the electorates which represent 'the people'. In the New Zealand context, entrenching provisions is one of the most effective ways to protect rights, as there is no possibility of total protection due to the doctrine of Parliamentary Sovereignty. However entrenching provisions would appear to indicate intent to protect rights. Section 6 of the Bill of Rights Act provides for judicial interpretation in favour of right-protecting interests, which allows judges to interpret around provisions in other legislation that may appear to impede human rights.

This in itself had opposition, with arguments that allowing such a provision to exist undermines the doctrine of Parliamentary Sovereignty and impinged on the political rights of citizens as it allowed un-elected and non-representative judges to interpret rights somewhat at their discretion. The universality of rights under the Universal Declaration of Human Rights would then be threatened also under this critique, as those who could afford good lawyers would then be at a greater advantage. Whether this is true in practice has not been proven, however it was one of the biggest points of opposition to the Bill of Rights Act prior to its inception.

==== New Zealand context ====
The ICCPR also contains statements on all peoples having a right to self-determination. Part of this right to self-determination is the right to determine political status freely. International human rights standards recognise that democratic and political rights require the protection of a range of other rights and freedoms, including the right to justice, freedom of expression, the right to peaceful assembly and freedom of association contained in the ICCPR. They must also be enjoyed without discrimination. This is stated in the ICCPR (as well as the Convention on the Elimination of All Forms of Discrimination against Women) (CEDAW) and the Convention on the Elimination of Racial Discrimination (CERD). Both CEDAW and CERD provide with specificity that the State should take steps to ensure the equal representation and participation of women, and of all ethnic and racial groups, in political processes and institutions (Article 7 of CEDAW and Article 5c of CERD).

New Zealand portrays a system by which these political rights are maintained. Equal possibility for representation exists for any citizen, regardless of gender or race. In this respect, the democratic rights standard under the ICCPR (and other UN conventions) is fulfilled with women and minority groups being able to vote, and be elected to Parliament. For example, New Zealand has female Members of Parliament, as well as those in the Māori, Pacific Islander, Asian, homosexual and Muslim minorities. Māori political rights are further protected by giving Māori people the option to be on the General or Māori electoral roll, and by having reserved seats in the House of Representatives. This formula in turn projects the number of Māori electorates, General electorates and thus party list seats under the Mixed member proportional representation electoral system.

Citizens are also given a further ability to participate in the system and exercise some democratic rights by way of 'citizen initiated referenda'(or citizen initiative). However these are not binding on Parliament and as such do not necessarily have a large degree of influence. It does however provide for assistance on public opinion for policy makers, and results can be taken into consideration when formulating Bills at various stages.

Political and democratic rights are also protected under the Treaty of Waitangi, one of New Zealand's founding documents and a source of law under the unwritten constitution. Article 1 of the Treaty infers the right to govern in New Zealand being the basis for the Westminster system of government. The rights of Māori to govern their own affairs where necessary is inferred by Article 2, and the extent to which all New Zealanders are proportionately represented in the institutions of the State, and which New Zealanders participate in political processes such as voting is covered by Article 3.

==== Framework for political rights protection ====
Human rights and democracy are internationally recognised as interdependent and provide a framework for assessing the extent to which democratic rights are respected in law and practice. According to this framework, there are two key democratic principles. The principle of popular control is the right to a controlling influence over public decisions and decision-makers. The principle of political equality is the right to be treated with equal respect and as of equal worth in the context of such decisions.

Recognition of the above principles requires a framework for guaranteed citizens' rights, a system of representative and accountable political institutions subject to popular authorisation, and active channeling of popular opinion and engagement with government by the people. Under this model, New Zealand recognises the political rights of its citizens in both law and practice. It does so by way of the Human Rights Commission, which provides a framework within the legal and political system; the ability to communicate and participate in the political system, and processes such as judicial review and complaints to the Office of the Ombudsman hold government and governmental departments accountable where necessary in order to maintain political rights.

== Economic, social and cultural rights ==
See generally: Economic, social and cultural rights

On 28 December 1978 New Zealand ratified the International Covenant on Economic, Social and Cultural Rights (ICESCR). Other international treaties which contain provisions concerning economic, social and cultural rights (ESCR) have also been ratified by New Zealand, such as the International Convention on the Elimination of All Forms of Racial Discrimination (CERD), the Convention on the Elimination of All Forms of Discrimination against Women (CEDAW), the Convention on the Rights of the Child (CRC) and the Convention on the Rights of Persons with Disabilities.

ESCR are not specifically protected by New Zealand's human rights focused statutes, the New Zealand Bill of Rights Act 1990 or the Human Rights Act 1993. The New Zealand Bill of Rights Act 1990 is predominantly concerned with the protection of civil and political rights. Including ESCR in the New Zealand Bill of Rights Act 1990 was suggested by the parliamentary Justice and Law Reform Select Committee in 1988, and was rejected by the Government.

Currently, ESCR are not considered justiciable in New Zealand because they affect policy and resource allocation considerations, matters for the New Zealand Government and Parliament to decide. Elements of various ESCR are protected by domestic legislation though. New Zealand has not ratified the Optional Protocol to the International Covenant on Economic, Social and Cultural Rights.

=== The right to an adequate standard of living ===
See generally: Right to an adequate standard of living

The right to an adequate standard of living comprises other ESCR, such as the rights to food, water and housing.

==== Food ====
See generally: Right to food

Though New Zealand does not face the levels of poverty exhibited in developing countries, it is generally recognised that relative poverty does exist in New Zealand. Relative poverty occurs when members of a society fall below the living standards which prevail in the society in which they live. For example, in 2013 260,000 dependent children, aged from 0 to 17 years, lived in relative poverty.

The realisation of the right to food has been aided by New Zealand charities. In the year 2013–2014, The Salvation Army provided 27,879 families with food parcels. KidsCan currently provides meals for 15,065 children per week. A Bill was introduced into the New Zealand Parliament in November 2012 to amend the Education Act 1989 to enable State-funded breakfast and lunch meals to be provided to students attending decile 1 and 2 schools, but it did not proceed beyond its first reading in March 2015.

==== Water ====
Advocacy concerning the right to water in New Zealand is centred upon the privatisation of the supply of water to households and opposing a 'user pay' approach to water consumption. Local government organisations that provide water services to communities are required to maintain their capacity to meet obligations such as retaining ownership and control of water services in their district/region. A local government organisation is allowed to enter into contracts concerning any aspect of providing water services, but they will remain legally responsible to provide such services and develop policy on the matter.

In January 2015 the New Zealand Māori Council proposed the allocation of water rights be administered through a national water policy and an associated commission. The Council's co-chair, Sir Eddie Durie, stated Māori have a 'senior right' to water in New Zealand, but their rights should not override what is good for the general public. The Human Rights Commission stated in 2012 there was increasing concern in New Zealand over the quality of drinking water, the effects of the agricultural industries' consumption of water, Treaty of Waitangi considerations regarding rights to and ownership of water, and access to water.

==== Housing ====
See generally: Right to housing

Discrimination in housing is contrary to the New Zealand Bill of Rights Act 1990, the Human Rights Act 1993 and the Residential Tenancies Act 1986. Housing affordability in regards to both the rental market and the property market is a social issue in New Zealand which has made access to housing difficult for even middle-class families In Lawson v Housing New Zealand, the applicant challenged the increase in rent to market levels for state housing provided by Housing New Zealand, (a state-owned enterprise), because it had adverse effects on the living standards of existing state housing tenants.

Because the right to housing is not specifically incorporated into domestic legislation the Court rejected considering whether the Government had met its international obligations concerning this right, and said it was instead a matter on which international forums could judge the Government. In 2013, the Ministry of Business, Innovation and Employment stated in Christchurch, due to the loss of housing in the 2010 and 2011 Canterbury earthquakes, there was a shortfall of 7,100 homes. The Human Rights Commission stated in December 2013 that there was a shortage of rental, temporary and emergency accommodation in Christchurch. The Auckland Housing Accord is currently being implemented by the Auckland Council and central Government in order to hasten and increase the number of affordable houses built in Auckland, to combat the housing crisis affecting the city.

=== The right to health ===
See generally: Right to health

There is no explicit right to health in New Zealand. However, there is a statutory framework which has been implemented over several decades which provides for the administration of health care and services. This framework includes the New Zealand Public Health and Disability Act 2000, the Health and Disability Services (Safety) Act 2001, the Health Practitioners Competence Assurance Act 2003 and the Heath Act 1956. The Accident Compensation Act 2001 also provides no-fault insurance cover for personal injuries, administered by the Accident Compensation Corporation. The New Zealand Bill of Rights Act 1990 also protects the right to health through the right not to be subjected to medical or scientific experimentation, the right to refuse medical treatment and the right to freedom from discrimination.

A publicly funded health system exists in New Zealand. District Health Boards decide what health services are to be funded in their region, based on national objectives and the specific needs of their locality, but this process has been criticised by commentators who claim it is not open and objective. The limited resources of the system were highlighted in Shortland v Northland Health Ltd, where a decision by medical professionals to discontinue a patient's dialysis treatment for resource allocation reasons was upheld, even though continued treatment would have saved the patients life. Poorer health outcomes for Māori and Pasifika people continue to persist.

=== The right to education ===
The right to education is not expressly provided for in New Zealand domestic law, but the realisation of the right can be seen across various statutes, policies and administrative practices. Such statutes include the Education Act 1989, the Education Standards Act 2001 and the Private Schools Conditional Integration Act 1975. From the ages of 5 years to 18 years, a person has the right to free primary and secondary education. This right extends to people who have special educational needs.

Citizens and residents of New Zealand must be enrolled at a registered school from their 6th birthday until their 16th birthday. In 2014, 95.9% of new school entrants had participated in early childhood education in the six months prior to starting primary school. 78.6% of 18-year-olds in 2013 had the equivalent of an NCEA Level 2 qualification or higher.

The number of Māori and Pasifika students leaving school with a National Qualifications Framework qualification has increased from 2004 levels. The number of 18-year-old Māori and Pasifika people with an NCEA Level 2 equivalent qualification or higher was less than that of European or Asian students in New Zealand. In 2008 the Secretary of the Ministry of Education acknowledged the link between economic and social factors and educational achievement, and that efforts to ensure that socio-economically disadvantaged children remained engaged in education needed to continue.

=== The right to work ===
Elements of the right to work and the right to the enjoyment of just and favourable work conditions are protected by the Minimum Wage Act 1983, the Health and Safety in Employment Act 1992, the Employment Relations Act 2000 and the Holidays Act 2003. New Zealand has ratified 60 of the International Labour Organization's Conventions, with 51 in force and 9 having been denounced. Discrimination in regards to accessing employment is prohibited on the grounds of age (from 16 years), colour, disability, employment status, ethnic belief, ethnic or national origin, family status, marital status, political opinion, race, religious belief, sex (including childbirth and pregnancy) and sexual orientation.

In Ministry of Health v Atkinson, the Court of Appeal held the Ministry of Health's policy that family members who provide support services for their disabled children were ineligible to be paid for such work was discriminatory on the basis of family status. The decision was overturned by the Public Health and Disability Amendment Act 2013. The Human Rights Commission states the country is making some progress in regards to the role of women in the workforce. Women remain underrepresented in areas of public life such as law, governance and corporate sector leadership. The gender pay gap in 2014 was 9.9 per cent. In 2013, the Employment Relations Act 2000 was amended to restrict workers' entitlements to paid breaks.

=== The right to social security ===
New Zealand has a history of providing various forms of social security. The system has been designed to assist people when they are, for example, ill, unemployed, injured and elderly. New Zealand's Ministry of Social Development both develops and implements social security policy. The Social Security Act 1964 provides for a three-tiered system of benefits:

1. Benefits to those in need such as the elderly, solo parents, the ill and the unemployed,
2. Supplementary assistance, which recognises that some people face unavoidable expenditure, for example, in the areas of childcare and accommodation, and
3. Financial assistance that provides a 'safety net', such as the Emergency Benefit.

Those who have suffered an accidental personal injury may also be eligible for financial support under the Accident Compensation Act 2001. Discrimination in the social security system has been alleged though. In Child Poverty Action Group v Attorney-General, provisions in the Income Tax Act 2007 prohibited families who received income benefits or accident compensation from being eligible for tax credits, but such discrimination was found to be justified under section 5 of the New Zealand Bill of Rights Act 1990. Academics have stated that New Zealand takes a 'needs-based' approach to the administration of social security, as opposed to a 'rights-based' approach.

=== Concluding observations of the Committee on Economic, Social and Cultural Rights 2012 ===
See generally: Committee on Economic, Social and Cultural Rights

The Committee on Economic, Social and Cultural Rights (CESCR) is a body consisting of 18 independent experts tasked with monitoring State parties' implementation of the ICESCR. New Zealand's efforts in implementing the ICESCR were last assessed and reported on by the CESCR in May 2012. This was New Zealand's third report from the CESCR. The Committee made several recommendations to New Zealand in order for the country to increase its protection of ESCR. Such recommendations included incorporating ESCR into the New Zealand Bill of Rights Act 1990 and enhancing the enjoyment of ESCR for Māori, Pasifika and people with disabilities.

Other recommendations included the rights of Māori to land, water and other such resources being legislated for, altering legislation to effectively provide for equal pay, continuing to guarantee the right to safe and affordable water, strengthening action to discourage tobacco consumption (especially among Māori and Pasifika youth) and ensuring the right to housing for all is guaranteed by policies and legislation.

== Indigenous peoples ==
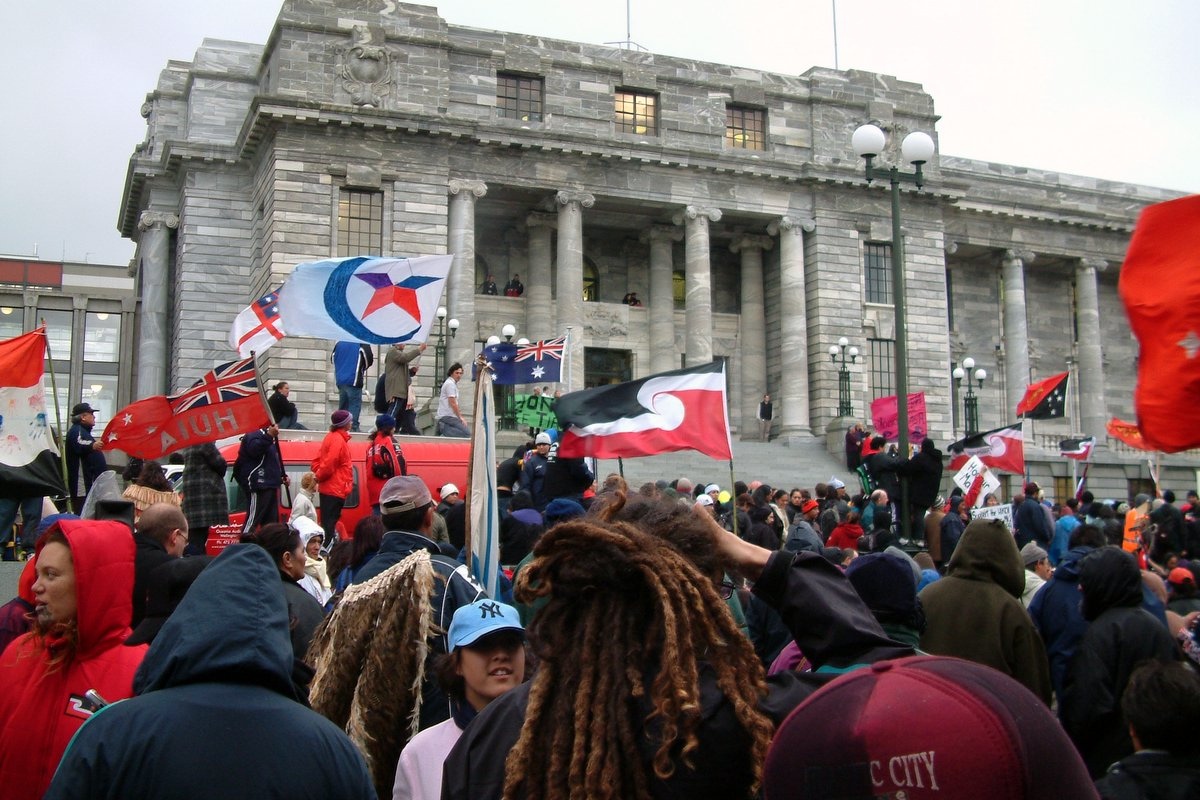
New Zealand foreshore and seabed controversy over land title

There are concerns regarding inequality between Māori and other ethnic groups, in terms of the disproportionate numbers of Māori people in the penitentiary system and on welfare support. The UN Committee on the Elimination of Racial Discrimination highlighted issues regarding the government handling of Māori land claims, suggesting that amendments should be made to the Treaty of Waitangi and the New Zealand Bill of Rights Act 1990.

Māori population on average run greater risks of many negative economic and social outcomes. Over 50% of Māori live in areas in the three highest deprivation deciles, compared with 24% of the rest of the population. Although Māori make up 14% of the population, they make up almost 50% of the prison population. Other issues include higher unemployment-rates than the general population in New Zealand

There are also issues regarding health, including higher levels of alcohol and drug abuse, smoking and obesity. Less frequent use of healthcare services mean that late diagnosis and treatment intervention lead to higher levels of morbidity and mortality in many manageable conditions, such as cervical cancer and diabetes per head of population than Pākehā (non-Māori)

Māori also have considerably lower life expectancies compared to non-Māori. In 2005–2007, at birth Māori male life expectancy was 70.4 years versus 79 years for non-Māori males (a difference of 8.6 years), while the life expectancy for Māori females was 75.1 years versus 83 years for non-Māori females (a difference of 7.9 years).

Others have voiced concern for the area of 'linguistic human rights', due to the degree of prejudice against the use of Māori language.

In 2010, Māori Affairs Minister Pita Sharples announced that the New Zealand Government would now support the Declaration on the Rights of Indigenous Peoples.

== Refugees ==
New Zealand is a party to the 1951 UN Convention Relating to the Status of Refugees and the 1967 protocol. In 2009, the government proposed an immigration bill which had provisions for passenger screening. In addition, the bill would permit the withholding of reasons for the denial of entry, and would deny the applicant access to judicial review. Such developments caused concern that the bill could lead to the possibility for prolonged detention.

== Human Rights Commission ==
The primary watchdog for human rights in New Zealand is the Human Rights Commission. Its stated mission is to work "for a fair, safe and just society, where diversity is valued, human rights are respected, and everyone is able to live free from prejudice and unlawful discrimination." The body is a member of Asia Pacific Forum of National Human Rights Institutions and of the International Coordinating Committee of national human rights institutions.

In 2010 the Commission conducted a publicly available review of human rights in New Zealand in order to both identify the areas in which New Zealand does well, and where it could do better to combat persistent social problems. The 'report card' is an update of the Commissions' first report in 2004, and will lead its work for the next five years. The report notes steady improvements in New Zealand's human rights record since 2004, but also "the fragility of some of the gains and areas where there has been deterioration." In the report, the Commission identifies thirty priority areas for action on human rights in New Zealand under a number of sections: general; civil and political rights; economic, social and cultural rights; and rights of specific groups.

== Limits on human rights in New Zealand ==
=== New Zealand Bill of Rights 1990 ===
The Bill of Rights Act is an unusual piece of legislation. Instead of superseding other legislation, it underwrites it. All other legislation is explicitly superior to BORA and takes precedence, but where at all possible, the law must be read in accordance with the act. BORA creates an assumption that any law that is written already complies with the Act unless that has been explicitly considered and rejected by Parliament.

Section 4 states that where there is inconsistencies between Acts, the Bill of Rights will bow. Section 5 states that all rights and freedoms are subject to reasonable limits prescribed by law in a democratic society.

Within the Act, there are still procedures in place to up hold all rights where possible. Section 6 of the Bill of Rights Act allows the Court to interpret all other enactment's meanings to be consistent with all rights. This section provides an immediate remedy to any unintentional inconsistencies which can take away an individual's rights.

Section 7 of the Bill of Rights Act is also important for upholding human rights, as it creates the mechanism where the Attorney-General is obligated to report an inconsistencies to the Bill of Rights to parliament. This is a paramount section as it keeps the legislator accountable to uphold New Zealanders' individual rights, but it also mitigates any unintentional breaches on any rights.

=== New Zealand's unwritten constitution ===
New Zealand is seen as one of the few countries in the world which does not have a physical document which acts as the state's constitution. New Zealand's unwritten constitution can be seen as a collective of many different acts, including the New Zealand Bill of Rights Act 1990. There are no entrenched Acts or Bills in New Zealand law, therefore the highest power is given to parliament. This therefore means that, if parliament has a majority vote, any piece of legislation can be overturned regardless of how much emphasis the court puts on it.

There has been criticism, over the years, in regards to this "unwritten constitution" and much encouragement from the international community to change this. The 2009 Universal Periodic Review on New Zealand, through the Human Rights Council, is a good demonstration of this. In this review concerns were expressed that, due to constitution, not entrenched, there was no overarching protection for human rights. Within the review multiple states expressed their concerns over the lack of protection human rights had, due to the constitutional framework; all states were seen to highly recommend New Zealand taking steps towards constitutional entrenchment, and therefore protected human rights. Aside from these issues brought up, the international community collectively commended New Zealand's work in upholding human rights, such as the amount of ratifications completed and the work with the Māori peoples.

There has been small glimmers of movement towards an entrenched and written constitution in the past few years. The "Constitutional Conversation" in 2013, a nationwide forum, was a select panel which considered what should be done, whilst also taking into consideration the views of the public. Nothing as of yet has come out of this. There is an opinion that it is not a question about "if" but of "when" the change will happen, as New Zealand is continually developing in its own individual identity.

== See also ==
- Constitution of New Zealand
- Law of New Zealand
- LGBT rights in New Zealand
- Transgender rights in New Zealand
- Intersex rights in New Zealand
- Human rights of older people in New Zealand
- Structural discrimination in New Zealand
