= Human rights of older people in New Zealand =

Rights of older people in New Zealand

The international human rights framework and domestic policy are the means by which the human rights of older people in New Zealand are protected. The key human rights issues facing older people in New Zealand encompass full participation within society, access to resources and a positive attitude to ageing.

== International law context ==
The human rights of older people are embedded within the covenants that comprise the International Bill of Rights. The Universal Declaration on Human Rights (UDHR) was adopted by the United Nations General Assembly in 1948. Article 1 establishes that “All human beings are born free and equal in dignity and rights”. Article 25(1) of the UDHR recognises the right of all to an adequate standard of living and where necessary social security, including in the event of old age.

The twin fundamental human rights treaties, the International Covenant on Civil and Political Rights (ICCPR) and the International Covenant on Economic, Social and Cultural Rights (ICESCR) were ratified by New Zealand in 1978 and embed older persons’ human rights without specific reference to age. For example, Article 25 of the ICCPR recognises participation rights for all people within the affairs of their own country and Article 26 equality of protection before the law without discrimination, although age is omitted from the specified grounds prohibited and must be read in under ‘or other status’. ICESCR rights of particular interest to older persons include Article 6 and 7 work-related rights, Article 9 social security rights, Article 11 adequate standard of living rights, Article 12 rights pertaining to the attainment of mental and physical health and the Article 13 education rights.

Under the UN human rights treaty framework it is the Convention on the Rights of Persons with Disabilities (CRPD), ratified by New Zealand in 2008, which may provide the most specific protection of older persons’ rights in New Zealand in circumstances where aging can be placed within the context of disability as disability is not specifically defined within the Convention. The only core UN human rights treaty instrument to specifically reference age as a prohibited ground of discrimination is the International Convention on the Protection of the Rights of All Migrant Workers and Members of Their Families (ICMW) in Article 7 however this convention has not yet been ratified by New Zealand.

In 1995 the Committee on Economic, Social and Cultural Rights (CESCR) stated that discrimination on the basis of age was not specifically incorporated in the ICCPR and ICESCR as it was not considered to be a significant issue at the time of drafting.

A 2013 report by the Office of the United Nations High Commissioner for Human Rights identified ageing as a ‘global phenomenon’ and subsequently acknowledged that “While most international human rights instruments are applicable to all age groups, including older persons, a number of human rights issues that are particularly relevant to older persons have not been given sufficient attention either in the wording of existing human rights instruments or in the practice of human rights bodies and mechanisms. These include, inter alia, age discrimination, access by older persons to work, adequate health services and social protection, protection from abuse, violence and neglect, and long-term care.”

The United Nations Principles for Older Persons is a ‘soft law’ instrument promoting respect for older people’s rights under the five themes of independence, participation, care, self-fulfilment and dignity. New Zealand does not consider a discrete convention on older people’s rights and ageing is required given the current protections available within the existing soft and hard law human rights instruments.

== Statutory protection from discrimination in New Zealand ==
Section 19 of the New Zealand Bill of Rights Act 1990 (NZBORA) recognises the right to freedom from discrimination on the thirteen grounds identified in s21(1) of the Human Rights Act 1993 including age under s21(1)(i). Section 5 of NZBORA recognises there may be justifiable limits to the rights and freedoms protected under the Act. Neither Act defines discrimination which may be direct or indirect.

== New Zealand Positive Ageing Strategy ==
The New Zealand Positive Ageing Strategy was released in 2001 to align the efforts of community and local and central government stakeholders to enhance the wellbeing of older people through ten aspirational goals. The goals are

- Income – secure and adequate income for older people
- Health – equitable, timely, affordable and accessible health services for older people
- Housing – affordable and appropriate housing options for older people
- Transport – affordable and accessible transport option for older people
- Ageing in the Community – older people feel safe and secure and can age in the community
- Cultural diversity – a range of culturally appropriate services allows choices for older people
- Rural services – older people living in rural communities are not disadvantaged when accessing services
- Positive attitudes – people of all ages have positive attitudes to ageing and older people
- Employment Opportunities – elimination of ageism and the promotion of flexible work options
- Opportunities for Personal Growth and Participation – increasing opportunities for personal growth and community participation.

A comparative review described the Positive Ageing Strategy as a framework identifying areas where the human rights of older people could be promoted rather than an active plan about how to achieve these goals to improve the lives of older persons.

== Employment ==
The age of compulsory retirement in New Zealand was abolished in 1999 to accord with the Human Rights Act 1993 prohibition on age discrimination. As a result older persons remain in paid employment at some of the highest rates in the OECD. In 2014 22 percent of over 65s continued to work in a paid capacity making up just over 5 percent of the total labour force. Projections suggest that by 2036 the percentage of older employees will increase to 30 percent and equate to 13 percent of the total labour force. Voluntary work undertaken by older persons is recognised as providing both a significant direct economic contribution as well as an indirect contribution where, for example, the provision of child care by a grandparent, enables a parent to return to paid work.

Two areas where older persons have faced challenges are finding employment in the first instance and access to training both to upskill and refresh capabilities. To assist the Human Rights Commission produced a publication to aid employers to recruit and retain older employees. Management continues to be an area where assistance for employers is needed.

Age affects eligibility for government funding to access tertiary education and therefore impacts upon the opportunities older persons have to retrain.

Since March 2015 the Employment Relations Act 2000 has supported flexible working arrangements for all employees. Legislating flexibility normalises varied work hours and days, which for older persons may include staged retirement.

Despite these gains discrimination within the workplace continues to impact upon the experiences of older persons.

== Income ==
Universal superannuation is available to New Zealand citizens and permanent residents from the age of 65. A hardship rate of only 3 percent within the older persons population is attributed to high levels of unencumbered (mortgage free) home ownership rates. 9 percent of older persons live on low incomes in comparison to 16 percent of the wider population. The potential for an increased future risk of hardship amongst older persons is forecast given decreasing rates of home ownership and low incomes affecting contributions to Kiwisaver.

== See also ==
- Human rights in New Zealand
- Grey Power (New Zealand)
