= Structural discrimination =

Form of institutional discrimination

Structural discrimination is a form of institutional discrimination against individuals of a given protected characteristic, such as race, gender, caste, etc, which has the effect of restricting their opportunities. It may be either intentional or unintentional, and it may involve either public or private institutional policies. Such discrimination occurs when these policies have disproportionately negative effects on the opportunities of certain social groups.

Some conceptualizations of structural discrimination focus on past forms of discrimination that have resulted in present-day inequality, while others focus on policies that still exist today and can have disproportionately negative effects on minority groups. One overt past example of structural discrimination was Jim Crow laws in the Southern United States, which were explicitly aimed at limiting the rights of black Americans in education, employment, and other areas of society.

== See also ==
- Sentencing disparity
- Structural discrimination in New Zealand
