= Grey Power (New Zealand) =

New Zealand-based lobby group

Grey Power is a New Zealand-based lobby group that promotes the interests of people over the age of 50.

Grey Power New Zealand Federation Inc. is made up of 76 associations across the country with a combined 90,000 members. Funding comes primarily from annual membership fees.

The Federation board consists of a President, Vice president, Treasurer, and seven regional Representatives. Seven regional directors are elected by the members of that region.

== History ==
Grey Power was formed in February 1986 by a group of Auckland-based superannuitants in protest against the New Zealand Government's proposal to apply a surcharge on pensions. The original group was known as the "Auckland Superannuitants Association". Association meetings began to draw media attention, raising national awareness of the group. Similar organizations began to form across the country, leading to the creation of the merged Grey Power New Zealand Federation. The scope of the organization broadened to concern itself with other issues facing the over-50 population, including health care and subsidies.

== Policy proposals ==
Grey Power lobbies for a tax-funded superannuation to be given to every New Zealander starting at age 65. Grey Power advocates that the payment not be means-tested and include provisions for those living alone. This policy caused the group to oppose suggestions by the Retirement Commissioner to increase the superannuation age and led John Key, the leader of the National Party at the time, to promise to "resign as Prime Minister" if he lowered the amount while in office. Grey Power actively opposed the sale of state-owned enterprises and opposed political parties for suggesting the idea. It lobbies for health care and a fairer justice system.

Grey Power weighed in on political matters not strictly related to their interests, such as child discipline. Before it was passed into law, Grey Power was concerned about the effect of the Crimes (Substituted Section 59) Amendment Act 2007 on parents and caregivers.

== Influence ==
Grey Power is increasing its membership due to the high percentage of people who are over 60. Their voice is increasingly considered by the government. Older New Zealanders succeeded in their fight against the pension surcharge, which led to a more general struggle encompassing the health, electricity costs, human rights, advertising, social services, local agencies and law enforcement, and justice.

== Benefits ==
The Grey Power party offers benefits for their members. These include a 5-year price protection on electricity. Members can apply to be a part of Grey Power Electricity. A number of businesses offer member discounts on products and supplies, as well as other local benefits that vary depending on store location. National discounts on Interislander ferries, New Zealand Rail, and Bluebridge are available. Other discounts include duty-free shopping at international airports and free accidental death insurance up to $2000.00.

== Achievements ==
- Removal of the Surtax
- Asset Testing Legislation being phased out
- Lower doctors' fee
- Lower Pharmacy Fees
- Lower Tariff Electricity
- Improved Regulations for Rest Homes
- Hearing aid subsidy increase
- Rates Rebate Scheme indexed to CPI
- Retention of SuperGold Card Off-Peak Travel
- Retention of SuperGold Card Waiheke Island Ferry Travel

== Party Activity ==
In January 2019, an 82 year old elderly woman suffering from dementia in her rest home was abused by Grant Hannis, a former journalism professor. He received a "shockingly inadequate" sentence of eight months to home detention 100 hours of community service and was ordered to pay $3000 in emotional support reparation. Grey Power is seeking solutions for abuse and neglect in rest homes.

== See also ==
- Human rights of older people in New Zealand
