= Universal Periodic Review of New Zealand =

The Universal Periodic Review (UPR) is a state monitoring mechanism of the United Nations Human Rights Council (HRC). It was established by General Assembly resolution 60/251 in 2006 to periodically review the protection and promotion of human rights in each of the 193 United Nations (UN) Member States. New Zealand has been reviewed twice via the UPR in 2009 and 2014.

== The UPR Process ==
The UPR process is detailed in the HRC Resolution 5/1. Each State is reviewed every four years. The review is based on the United Nations Charter, Universal Declaration of Human Rights, any other international human rights instruments the State is party to as well as any voluntary pledges or commitments it has made. The HRC appoints a 'troika' of three HRC Member States to review each State's report. Three documents are provided for the troika to consider: The national State report, the Office of the High Commissioner for Human Rights (OHCHR) compilation of all UN information regarding that State and the OHCHR summary of stakeholder submissions. In addition, questions from other HRC Member States are given to the State party being reviewed to answer in its national report. The troika then present to the Working Group an outcome document, which summarises the review proceedings and includes recommendations. The Working Group comprises all 47 of the HRC Member States & conducts the country reviews. New Zealand is given a period of time to review the recommendations and can choose to either accept and implement them accordingly or explain why it does not accept them.

The main goal of the UPR is to maintain and improve the domestic human rights situation in United Nations countries. The UPR process provides the opportunity for UN countries as well as NGO's, other relevant UN bodies and individuals to raise concerns regarding the human rights situations in the country under review. The process allows the sharing of ideas and practices on how to best ensure that human rights obligations are complied with. It also allows governments to reflect on their own human rights situations and the public to offer their own views and feedback. Anyone who is interested in the UPR process can participate. This can include:

- Iwi and other Maori groups.
- NGO's.
- Human rights defenders.
- Trade unions.
- Community groups, churches and charities.
- Local government.
- Academic institutions.
- National human rights institutions, such as the NZHRC.

== New Zealand's Review ==
In September 2008, the HRC selected Italy, Mauritius and the Philippines to form the troika. A list of questions was prepared by Argentina, Denmark, Hungary, Germany, the Netherlands, Sweden, the Czech Republic and the United Kingdom of Great Britain and Northern Ireland; and presented to NZ for consideration. The majority of questions focused on the social inequities (health, housing, employment, education, social services and criminal justice) faced by the indigenous people of New Zealand (NZ) (Māori); the high level of domestic violence against women and children; and why the Treaty of Waitangi is not given greater constitutional recognition and protection.

In January 2014, the HRC selected Cote d'Ivoire, Japan and the Russian Federation to form the troika. A list of questions was prepared by the Czech Republic, Germany, Liechtenstein, Mexico, the Netherlands, Slovenia, Spain and the United Kingdom of Great Britain and Northern Ireland. As in 2008, the focus of the questions remained on the reduction of the high level of domestic violence against women and children; the rights of the indigenous people and the social inequities faced by them as outlined above. In addition, the questions focused on the measures taken by the New Zealand Government to eliminate child poverty.

The three reports of the 1st and 2nd cycle of the UPR comment on the following areas: scope of international obligations, NZ's constitutional and legislative framework, NZ's institutional and human rights infrastructure, and the promotion and protection of human rights. This last category examines specifically:

- Areas of equality and non-discrimination regarding Māori, women, persons with disabilities, senior citizens and sexual orientation;
- Right to life, liberty and security of the person;
- Right to freedom of expression;
- Freedom of religion or belief;
- Administration of justice and the rule of law;
- Right to participate in political and public life;
- Right to work and to just and favourable working conditions;
- Right to social security & to an adequate standard of living;
- Right to health;
- Right to education and to participate in the cultural life of the community;
- Rights of indigenous peoples;
- Migrants, refugees and asylum seekers; and
- Human Rights and counter-terrorism.

== National Report ==
In 2008 the NZ Ministry of Foreign Affairs and Trade (MFAT) engaged in a consultation process with relevant stakeholders. In August 2008, MFAT held meetings with over 70 civil society organisations and NGOs. Following ministerial and departmental consultation, a draft report was released to the public in February 2009 for comment, after which the report was finalised. The 20-page report noted that NZ is party to seven of the nine 'core' human right treaties. NZ has two primary human rights enactments: the New Zealand Bill of Rights Act 1990 (NZBORA) which affirms, protects and promotes fundamental rights and freedoms in NZ; and the New Zealand Human Rights Act 1993 which prohibits discrimination. NZ also has a varied human rights infrastructure; including the Office of the Ombudsman, the Health and Disability Commissioner and New Zealand Human Rights Commission (NZHRC); a National human rights institutions [sic] (NHRI) with an 'A' status accreditation. The report concluded with seven key priorities for future action of the NZ Government.

1. Improving the economic, social and cultural wellbeing of people in New Zealand;
2. Reducing violence within families and its impact on women and children;
3. Improving the opportunities and responsibilities of young people in New Zealand through the education and youth justice systems;
4. Strengthening the rights of victims of crime;
5. Improving the consultation process with civil society for future human rights reporting and follow-up recommendations;
6. Strengthening the partnership between the Government and Māori by continuing to support Māori to realise their potential and continuing the momentum on achieving fair, just and practical settlements of historical claims under the Treaty of Waitangi; and
7. The implementation of the Convention on the Rights of Persons with Disabilities (CRPD) and the New Zealand Disability Strategy.

The report also addressed the human rights situation of Tokelau. New Zealand is responsible for the fulfillment of obligations contained in treaties that are extended to Tokelau. Constitutional relationships are also maintained with the governments of the Cook Islands and Niue. The governments are consulted during the UPR process and are given the opportunity to comment on the draft report.

The consultation process for New Zealand's 2nd national UPR report was managed by MFAT in collaboration with other government agencies including the Ministry of Justice, Te Puni Kokiri and the NZHRC. In April 2013, public consultation meetings were held in six centres across New Zealand. The meetings were attended by a broad range of civil society organisations and NGO's, iwi (Maori tribe/s) and individuals who raised specific human rights issues. The draft report acknowledged the issues raised and was released for public comment in August 2013. Relevant stakeholders including the governments of the Cook Islands, Niue and Tokelau were invited to comment on the draft report. The 20-page report was finalized in October 2013 and submitted to the UN in November 2013. The report addressed the improvements made following the acceptance of the 56 recommendations in 2009 by way of sub-headings. Six key priorities for future action were listed.

1. Strengthening the partnership between Government and Maori by continuing to support Maori to realise their potential and continuing the momentum on achieving fair, just and durable settlements of historical claims under the Treaty of Waitangi;
2. Improving the protection of children against abuse and neglect;
3. Reducing violence within families and its impact on women and children;
4. The ongoing implementation of CRPD (including accession to the Optional Protocol and the New Zealand Disability Strategy);
5. Advancing the Constitutional Review process; and
6. Ensuring any human rights impacts of the Canterbury earthquakes are accounted for in the ongoing decisions around the rebuild.

== Stakeholder and Compilation Reports ==
In 2008, stakeholder submissions were made by the NZHRC, and the remaining 14 submissions were from NGOs and civil society organisations. The compilation report contains information gathered from the reports of other UN treaty bodies, special procedures, and any other relevant official UN documents. Both reports echoed the concerns found in the delegate questions to NZ and those acknowledged in the national report. In addition it was suggested that the Waitangi Tribunal recommendations should be made binding; concern was expressed at NZ's vote against the Declaration on the Rights of Indigenous Peoples (DRIP); and repeal of the Foreshore and Seabed Act 2004, which extinguished any Māori customary territorial title to the foreshore or seabed in NZ, was urged. The repeal of section 59 of the Crimes Act 1961 (which had provided a defence of reasonable force for parents who physically discipline their children) was welcomed, but unease was expressed about plans for a referendum on the issue. There was concern regarding the systemic gender pay gap; the alarmingly high child poverty rates; and the proposed amendments to the Terrorism Suppression Act 2002, which may result in unwarranted intrusion into the rights to freedom of association and expression. Also the 2007 New Zealand anti-terror raids and the treatment Māori received during them.

In addition to making submissions, stakeholders may also participate in other ways, including:

- Commenting on New Zealand's draft report when it is released.
- Lobbying the Working Group of countries reviewing New Zealand's report.
- Making presentations to the UNHRC when the report is being adopted.
- Monitoring and participating in New Zealand's implementation of UPR recommendations.

In 2013, 54 stakeholder submissions were made. These included a submission from the NZHRC, and the remaining 53 submissions were from NGO's and civil society organisations. As in 2008, both reports addressed those issues referred to in the delegate questions to NZ and acknowledged in the national report. Concern was expressed regarding the rights of the indigenous people of NZ; it was suggested that NZ should adopt the Special Rapporteur's recommendation of 2011 that the principles enshrined in the Treaty of Waitangi should be safeguarded within the domestic legal system; entrenchment of the Treaty as a constitutional norm was emphasised. As in 2008, concern was raised about Operation 8 (anti-terrorism raids carried out on 15 October 2007), which allegedly used excessive use of force against Maori Communities; it was recommended that NZ ensure that the Terrorism Suppression Amendment Act 2007 is not applied in a discriminatory manner. In addition, gender equality and domestic violence against women and children remained prominent issues. The impact of the Canterbury earthquakes was also addressed; regarding the political rights of the Christchurch community to engage in decision making; the right to an adequate standard of living; and the rights of disabled people to access buildings.

== Working Group Review ==
The Working Group review of the 1st cycle of the UPR was held on 7 May 2009. The NZ delegation comprised 11 members and was led by Justice Minister Simon Powel. It included representatives of the Ministry of Justice, the Crown Law Office, the Department of Labour, the Department of Corrections, the Ministry of Foreign Affairs and Trade and the Permanent Mission of New Zealand to the United Nations Office at Geneva. Following the presentation by NZ of its report, the 36 delegates (from other State Members) entered into an interactive dialogue with NZ. Individual member states could ask questions and make recommendations, though NZ was under no obligation to accept any of the recommendations. Statements were made referring to positive achievements by NZ: accession to most international human rights instruments; efforts to protect and uphold the rights of the Māori population and economic and social improvements for Māori and Pacific peoples to combat discrimination, to enhance the rights of the child; advancements in the area of women's rights and gender parity; the State's Domestic Violence immigration policy, Taskforce for Action on Sexual Violence and the establishment of Family Courts; the active role of New Zealand in promoting the rights of persons with disabilities; the standing invitation extended to UN Special Procedures; the comprehensive scheme of social security and social safety nets; the New Zealand Bill of Rights Act and the Human Rights Act; policies to reduce poverty and to improve access to primary health; and the establishment of the NZHRC. Statements of concern were expressed relating to the issues identified in the reports mentioned above. NZ was given an opportunity to respond to these statements, and mention strategies being introduced to combat these issues.

The working Group Review of the 2nd UPR was held on 27 January 2014. The NZ delegation comprised 9 members and was led by Hon Judith Collins, Minister of Justice, Minister for Accident Compensation Corporation (ACC) and Minister for Ethnic Affairs. Following the presentation of the national report, the 76 delegates (from other State Members) entered into an interactive dialogue with NZ. Discussion referring to the improvements made by NZ following the 1st cycle of the UPR in 2009 was made; in 2010 NZ had moved to support the DRIP and in 2011 had ratified the Optional Protocol on the Rights of the Child on the sale of Children, Child Prostitution, and Child Pornography; the Ministry of Social Development launched a White Paper for Vulnerable Children and the Children's Action Plan focusing on children who are at risk of being abused or neglected; in May 2013 the Parliament had eliminated an area of discrimination with the Marriage Amendment Act 2013, which allowed for marriage between any two people regardless of gender identity, sex, or sexual orientation. As in 2009, statements of concern were expressed relating to the issues identified in the three reports. NZ was given an opportunity to respond.

== Recommendations to New Zealand ==
In 2009, delegates gave a list of 64 recommendations. 14 were directed at either the ratification of international instruments or the removal of existing reservations, including supporting the UNDRIP. 7 called for further incorporation of international human rights obligations into domestic law. 3 related to the implementation of treaty body recommendations for the protection of human rights and a further 2 urged cooperation with human rights mechanisms. The vast majority of recommendations related to the area of equality and non-discrimination – 22 in total. Among the suggestions were calls to continue to adopt policies to achieve full gender parity and to address the socio-economic inequalities affecting Māori and other minorities, as well as incorporating the fight against xenophobia and racism in the education curriculum. A further 11 were directed at the area of right to life, liberty and security of the person: in particular to increase efforts to combat domestic violence; greater attention to the monitoring of human trafficking; and separate juvenile detention facilities for juvenile offenders. Four were directed specifically at issues concerning Māori: generally to settle land claims comprehensively and provide adequate compensation; and to continue dialogue between the State and Māori regarding the Foreshore and Seabed Act 2004. Two addressed the proposed amendments to the Terrorism Suppression Act and recommended they be dropped. The final recommendation asked NZ to ensure that it consulted with civil society in the follow-up to the UPR recommendations.

In 2014, delegates gave a list of 155 recommendations. As in 2009, many recommendations were made regarding the ratification of international human rights instruments and the removal of reservations. 16 recommendations focused on constitutional amendment regarding indigenous rights. Among the suggestions were calls to incorporate the Treaty of Waitangi; take concrete measures to ensure the implementation and promotion of the UN DRIP; and to continue to address all forms of political, economic and social discrimination against the Maori and Pacific population by meeting their various demands for constitutional and legal reforms and recognition. A further 18 recommendations were directed at the socio-economic disparities and discrimination faced by Maori and Pacific peoples; one such recommendation suggested that NZ take further steps to understand the causes of inequality faced by indigenous people and to minimize their effects. 4 recommendations related to structural discrimination; 4 to the inclusion of economic and social rights into the New Zealand Bill of Rights 1990; 5 to the rights of migrants, refugees, asylum-seekers and their families; 1 to surveillance; 1 to counter-terrorism measures; and 7 to child poverty. 25 recommendations were directed at women's rights; among these was the call for a national plan to address specific issues such as violence and pay inequality. A further 3 recommendations were made regarding the Canterbury earthquakes; including to consider policies in relation to gender mainstreaming, adequacy of housing and access to buildings for persons with disabilities; and to facilitate the realization of economic, social and cultural rights through the reconstruction of the areas affected.

== New Zealand response to recommendations ==
In 2009, the Government accepted 33 of the 64 recommendations unreservedly, with an additional 12 agreed to after further discussion. A qualified response was given to 11: for example NZ agreed with the "underlying premise" of recommendation 21 "to continue the public discussion on the status of the Treaty of Waitangi", though NZ did "not assume that the current mechanisms in place were inadequate or that entrenchment of the Treaty is the only possible outcome". Eight were rejected. Three of these related to International Labour Organization conventions, which NZ believes are inconsistent with NZ's "unique legal, constitutional and Treaty of Waitangi arrangements." The HRC formally adopted the outcomes of NZ's UPR on 24 September 2009.

The NZ government response to the 2nd cycle of the UPR process was released on 26 May 2014. New Zealand received 155 recommendations as part of the UPR Working Group process. The government response was to accept 121 recommendations and reject 34. Unless accepted outright (fully supported and implemented) reasoning was given for each recommendation, for example, a decision split over distinct areas may be made to accept the "spirit" behind the recommendation but not accept the "method of implementation". The report was adopted by the Human Rights Council on 19 June 2014.

== NGOs/Civil Society ==
In the addendum to the 2014 review, after meeting with individuals, NGOs and civil society, NZ received 11 civil society submissions, bringing the total to 54. NGOs and civil society, while able to make submissions, are not part of the Working Group and can sometimes appear to be side-lined. Academics and jurists see UPR as a mechanism to "empower" both civil society and the human rights movement as it affects New Zealanders in everyday life. McGregor et al states that "the UPR process clearly has raised covenant consciousness generally with civil society in New Zealand." Alex Conte discussed the UPR process in between the first and second cycle and stated that many see the key benefit to come out of the process as the greater consultation with civil society as well as to "improve the situation of human rights on the ground". In response to the second cycle of the UPR, NZ acknowledged that some issues, rights relating to sexual orientation. gender identity, intersex people and legal abortion, were not reflected in the recommendations of the Working Group or the interactive dialogue of the UPR. As these issues were raised by the Human Rights Commission and NGOs in the submissions, NZ proposed to follow up separately as part of the ongoing civil society interactions with the UPR.

== Human Rights Commission National Plan of Action ==
The New Zealand Human Rights Commission has a National Plan of Action for the Protection and Promotion of Human Rights (National Plan of Action). The National Plan of Action bridges the UPR and the work being done on the recommendations looking towards the next review cycle and the people it purports to protect. It was formed by the Human Rights Commission together with local government, iwi, civil society and non-government organisations to respond to and address recommendations made by the second cycle of the UPR. The plan is available publicly on the Human Rights Commission website and there is an interactive webtool which "monitors human rights in New Zealand". The Human Rights Commission coordinates and develops the National Plan of Action but it is mandated by the Human Rights Act 1993. It is a collaborative effort. Government agencies identify actions which will "progress the UPR recommendations accepted by government." The Human Rights Commission identify "civil society stakeholders who should be involved in creating and monitoring" the actions. The plan then sets out "a small number of concrete, achievable actions with timeframes" and holds identifiable agencies accountable. These are reported as per the plan. There are four main focus areas for the National Plan of Action:

- How human rights issues are managed within the policy and law making processes
- New Zealand's growing diversity and its impacts on our society and race relations
- Issues raised in respect of inequalities and discrimination in New Zealand
- Tackling violence and abuse in New Zealand

=== Criticism ===
There was a plan for a National Plan after the first cycle of UPR, however the government did not adopt it. McGregor et al discusses the consequence of that failure to adopt the first plan as various civil society and NGOs required more clarity from the plan for the second National Plan of Action and had concerns about the outcome of the plan.

== Academic assessment ==
=== Responses to recommendations ===
The first cycle of UPR had problems with responses to recommendations and concerns about the implementation of recommendations. Conte discussed the problems which evolved from having three answers available to states: accept, reject and partially accept. This led to convoluted answers from some states which slowed the process. For the second cycle the answers were more defined being only accept or reject, however as an official report written by Judy McGregor, Sylvia Bell and Margaret Wilson (McGregor et al) shows answers were still convoluted. New Zealand rejected 34 recommendations but used language such as "New Zealand accepts the spirit of these recommendations, but is unable to accept them in full" when rejecting a recommendation. McGregor et al see this as "differentiating" between "acceptance through spirit and acceptance through action." Language used is an ongoing and complex concern with responses as they impact on the level of action taken by states.

=== Ratification and compliance ===
Conte said that UPR would need to "live up to expectations" and really change "human rights on the ground translating the recommendations and commitments made under the first cycle into measurable improvements". McGregor et al outlines the progression of New Zealand's human rights instruments with the ongoing UPR process. There has been little progress since the first UPR cycle in 2009 in terms of ratification of human rights treaties in New Zealand. This is largely because compliance was already high as New Zealand is an early adopter of many significant treaties. In 2010 New Zealand accepted the United Nations Declaration on the Rights of Indigenous Peoples. McGregor et al found that there has been a "maturing of process" from the first cycle of UPR to the second and that this can be seen in the wider involvement in civil society, the increased prominence of the Human Rights Commission and the increase in the number of recommendations from cycle one to cycle two.

== Media Coverage of UPR ==
The UPR process is not closely covered by New Zealand media. Media coverage of human rights issues is centred on specific issues relevant to current events which were covered in UPR recommendations to NZ. This is similar to global trends in reporting of UPR in mainstream media. The lack of publicity given to the UPR process in NZ was described by McGregor et al as an "existing indifference of the mainstream news media to human rights treaty body reporting in terms of publicity and promotion." This was not the position of the government. Media attention was described by the Minister of Justice as being of a "moderate amount", however academics such as McGregor at al see this as an inflated assessment which precludes open reporting and creates a barrier to awareness of human rights and treaty body reporting being reported in a clear and systematic way. In McGregor et al's report a practical recommendation was given to improve reporting of human rights and the international treaty body system. It was suggested that Journalists Educators' Association of New Zealand (JEANZ) and the Human Rights Commission (HRC) work together to develop a "practical toolkit for journalists" to encourage and facilitate reporting.
