= Human Rights Act 1993 =

Act of Parliament in New Zealand

New Zealand Parliament
- Long title: An Act to consolidate and amend the Race Relations Act 1971 and the Human Rights Commission Act 1977 and to provide better protection of human rights in New Zealand in general accordance with United Nations Covenants or Conventions on Human Rights
- Royal assent: 10 August 1993
- Commenced: 1 February 1994
- Administered by: Ministry of Justice

Related legislation
- New Zealand Bill of Rights Act 1990
- Status: Current legislation

The Human Rights Act 1993 is an Act of the Parliament of New Zealand that deals with discrimination. It was a consolidation and amendment of the Race Relations Act 1971 and the Human Rights Commission Act 1977. It came into force on 1 February 1994. The Act governs the work of the New Zealand Human Rights Commission.

== Legislative features ==
The act outlawed discrimination on a wide variety of grounds, including:

1. Sex (including pregnancy and childbirth)
2. Marital status
3. Religious belief
4. Ethical belief
5. Colour
6. Race
7. Ethnic or national origins
8. Disability
9. Age
10. Political opinion
11. Employment status
12. Family status
13. Sexual orientation

There are a significant number of caveats, including "genuine occupational qualification," "domestic employment in a private household," "to preserve reasonable standards of privacy," "national security" and "organised religion."

The Act does not explicitly prohibit discrimination on the basis of gender identity, however it is interpreted by the solicitor general of the time that gender identity is protected under the basis of sex or sexual orientation. Despite this interpretation, concerns remain that this decision is easily reversed.

== See also ==
- Human rights in New Zealand
- New Zealand Bill of Rights Act 1990
- LGBT rights in New Zealand
