= Trade unions in Egypt =

- National organization(s): ETUF, EFITU, EDLC
- Primary legislation: Law no. 213/2017 on Trade Unions
- Total union membership: 7 million
- Density: 42% (waged workers); 23% (all workers)

Global Rights Index
- 5 No guarantee of rights

International Labour Organization
- Egypt is a member of the ILO

Convention ratification
- Freedom of Association: 6 November 1957
- Right to Organise: 3 July 1954

Trade unions in Egypt first emerged at the start of the 20th century, although organised collective action in the form of strikes undertaken by workers was recorded as early as 1882. The Manual Trade Workers Union was founded in 1908 under the leadership of the Egyptian Nationalist Party in 1908.

Following Egypt's formal independence in the mid-1950s trade unions were incorporated into state structures and only one officially recognised national centre existed. Starting in the 1970s and intensifying dramatically during the first decade of the 21st century, an independent, organised (but unofficial) labour movement took root in the country. This movement ultimately played a significant role in the Egyptian revolution of 2011 and the subsequent growth of independent trade unions and trade union pluralism. However, with the 2013 Egyptian coup d'état and changes in laws governing trade unions, the situation for labour rights significantly worsened. In March 2018, independent unions were dissolved and required to reregister within 60 days; of 1,000 independent unions in existence previously, only 122 were recognised by the state within the time frame.

== Early history of trade unionism ==
Trade unionism grew first in the cigarette sector following a successfully coordinated strike from December 1889 to February 1900 and over the next ten years, trade unions were founded to represent workers in the textiles industry, printers, metal workers, barbers and lawyers clerks.
