= Democratic Trade Union Confederation of Romania =

Romanian national trade union center

CSDR
- Democratic Trade Union Confederation of Romania
- Founded: 1994
- Headquarters: Bucharest, Romania
- Location: Romania
- Members: 345,000
- Key people: Jacob Baciu, president
- Affiliations: ITUC, ETUC

The Democratic Trade Union Confederation of Romania (Confederaţia Sindicatelor Democratice din România, CSDR) is a national trade union center in Romania. It was formed in 1994 in a split with the National Confederation of Free Trade Unions of Romania (CNSLR).

Victor Ciorbea, the first president of the CSDR, went on to become Prime Minister of Romania in 1996.

The CSDR is affiliated with the International Trade Union Confederation and the European Trade Union Confederation.
