= Andorran Workers' Union =

Trade union in Andorra

The Andorran Workers' Union is a trade union in the Principality of Andorra. It was established in 1990, and claimed several hundred members. It was the first workers union in Andorra, the only European country in which the formation of this type of group was not allowed to be established, and it was intended to improve the working conditions and quality of life of the Andorran population. It was the first union in Andorra. The government also did not allow it to legally form. It had gradually become inactive, but it was reestablished in 2021.

The constitution of the union professed an ideology of autonomous trade unionism. Since the General Council of Andorra considered the union illegal, it secretly set up a management committee on 14 June 1988. The union's founding congress was held on March 8, 1990. Present were the secretary general of the Unión General de Trabajadores, and vice-president of the ETUC; Nicolás Redondo, the leader of the Workers' Commissions; Marcelino Camacho, and, the secretary of the European Trade Union Confederation; Matias Hintercheid.

The first executive committee was formed on Antoni Roig as general secretary, Guillem Fornieles i Alacid as organization secretary, Cristian Cerdoya as international relations secretary, Dídac Subirats as press secretary and Josep Lluís Santos as trade union action secretary, in addition to four other national secretaries. Guillem Fornieles i Alacid had presided as the leader of the organisation from 2019, or before, until he retired in 2021. After being revived, it is being led by Christian Asensio.

It had good relations with the Unió Sindical d'Andorra, and the Podemos, until it was first dissolved in 2021.

== Bibliography ==
- ICTUR; et al., eds. (2005). Trade Unions of the World 6th Ed. John Harper Publishing. ISBN 978-0-9543811-5-8.
- Àlvar Valls Oliva (2006-12-18). Diccionari Enciclopèdic d'Andorra (in Catalan). Andorra la Vella: Fundació Crèdit Andorrà. ISBN 978-99920-1-629-9.
