= Pan-European Regional Council =

European trade union organization

PERC
- Pan-European Regional Council
- Founded: March 19, 2007
- Headquarters: Brussels, Belgium
- Location: International
- Members: 85 million
- Key people: Esther Lynch, general secretary Igor Zubcu, president
- Affiliations: ITUC
- Website: perc.ituc-csi.org

The Pan-European Regional Council (PERC) is a European trade union organization within the International Trade Union Confederation (ITUC). It includes 87 national trade union centres with a total membership of over 85 million. PERC also works closely with the European Trade Union Confederation (ETUC), and currently Esther Lynch is general secretary of both organizations.

According to the organization Constitution, the PERC:

will work to promote the strategies, priorities and policies of the ITUC and will seek to contribute to social development, the consolidation of democracy and to respect for human and workers’ rights in the region. Promotion of trade union action, and representation of workers’ interests through the strengthening of the trade union movement and support for bilateral and multilateral cooperation, will be central objectives of the Council.
