= Confederation of Trade Unions of the Slovak Republic =

National trade union center in Slovakia

KOZ SR
- Confederation of Trade Unions of the Slovak Republic
- Konfederácia odborových zväzov Slovenskej republiky
- Headquarters: Bratislava, Slovakia
- Location: Slovakia
- Members: 250,000
- Key people: Monika Uhlerová, president
- Affiliations: ITUC, ETUC,
- Website: www.kozsr.sk

The Confederation of Trade Unions of the Slovak Republic (KOZ SR) is a national trade union center in Slovakia. The KOZ SR is affiliated with the International Trade Union Confederation, and the European Trade Union Confederation.

== History ==
In March, 1990 the Czechoslovak Confederation of Trade Unions (CSKOS) was formed from the remains of the Revolutionary Trade Union Movement (ROH). Within months, as the separation of the two states developed, the party was divided into the Bohemian-Moravian Chamber (CMK CSKOS) and the KOZ SR.

During the Dzurinda-era, the KOZ became weakened. In 2006 KOZ and the left-wing SMER party agreed on cooperation, and the KOZ supported the SMER. After the SMER election victory in 2006, the KOZ once again gained strength.

== Literature ==
- ICTUR; et al., eds. (2005). Trade Unions of the World (6th ed.). London, UK: John Harper Publishing. ISBN 0-9543811-5-7.
