= Lithuanian Trade Union – Solidarity =

Trade union in Lithuania

Solidarumas
- Lithuanian Trade Union - Solidarity
- Lietuvos Profesinė Sajunga "Solidarumas"
- Headquarters: Vilnius, Lithuania
- Location: Lithuania
- Members: 52,000
- Key people: Aldona Jašinskienė, president
- Affiliations: ITUC, ETUC
- Website: www.solidarumas.lt

Solidarumas is a national trade union center in Lithuania. It has a membership of 52,000 and is affiliated with the International Trade Union Confederation and the European Trade Union Confederation.
