= BNS =

BNS may stand for:

- BNS, American rapper and producer
- Baltic News Service
- Bandai Namco Studios
- Bangladesh Navy Ship prefix
- Barnes railway station, England, station code
- Basic Necessities Survey
- Bathiya and Santhush, Sri Lankan hip hop duo
- Beijing National Stadium
- Best Node Search algorithm
- Bharatiya Nyaya Sanhita, the new Indian penal code passed in 2023
- British Neuropathological Society
- British Numismatic Society, founded in 1903
- British Nylon Spinners (1940–1964), a company licensed to produce Nylon yarn
- Blocul National Sindical, the National Trade Union Bloc, Romania
- Boustead Naval Shipyard
- Scotiabank, formerly "Bank of Nova Scotia", stock ticker
