= Autonomous Trade Union Confederation =

Trade union

ASzSz
- Autonomous Trade Union Confederation
- Autonóm Szakszervezetek Szövetsége
- Headquarters: Budapest, Hungary
- Location: Hungary
- Members: 120,000
- Affiliations: ITUC, ETUC
- Website: www.autonom.hu

The Autonomous Trade Union Confederation (Hungarian: Autonóm Szakszervezetek Szövetsége, ASzSz) is a national trade union center in Hungary. It has a membership of 120,000.

The ASzSz is affiliated with the International Trade Union Confederation, and the European Trade Union Confederation.
