= Talo =

Talo or TALO may refer to:

- Talo (food), a type of bread originating from the Basque Country
- TALO, an Estonian trade union
- Talo colony, a colony of Galoli language speakers located on the Wetar island

== Places ==
- Talo Monastery, a Buddhist temple in Bhutan
- Talo Dam, a dam on the Bani River, Mali
- Lefter Talo, a village in the Livadhja municipality, Albania
- Ta Lo, a fictional realm in the Marvel Cinematic Universe
