= Central Autónoma de Trabajadores del Perú =

Peruvian trade union center

CATP
- Central Autónoma de Trabajadores del Perú
- Founded: 1986
- Headquarters: Avenida Nicolas de Pierola N° 757 Oficina 300 Lima, Peru
- Location: Peru
- Key people: Paola Aliaga Huatuco, Secretaria General.
- Affiliations: ITUC
- Website: www.catperu.org.pe

The Central Autónoma de Trabajadores del Perú (CATP) is a national trade union center in Peru. It is affiliated with the International Trade Union Confederation.
