= National Trade Union Bloc =

BNS
- National Trade Union Bloc
- Blocul Național Sindical
- Founded: 1991
- Headquarters: Bucharest, Romania
- Location: Romania
- Members: 375,000
- Key people: Dumitru Costin, president Matei Bratianu, secretary general
- Affiliations: ITUC, ETUC
- Website: www.bns.ro

The National Trade Union Bloc (Romanian: Blocul Național Sindical, BNS) is the second largest national trade union center in Romania. It was founded in 1991 and has a membership of 375,000.

Plans for a BNS merger with CNSLR-Fratia were announced in 1994, however this has not taken place.

BNS is affiliated with the International Trade Union Confederation, and the European Trade Union Confederation.
