= Free Trade Union Confederation of Latvia =

Trade union based in Riga, Latvia

LBAS
- Free Trade Union Confederation of Latvia
- Latvijas Brīvo arodbiedrību savienība
- Founded: 1990
- Headquarters: Riga, Latvia
- Location: Latvia
- Members: 165,000
- Key people: Pēteris Krīgers, president
- Affiliations: ITUC, ETUC
- Website: www.lbas.lv

The Free Trade Union Confederation of Latvia (Latvian: Latvijas Brīvo arodbiedrību savienība; LBAS) is the only national trade union center in Latvia. It was founded in 1990 as a reformation of the Soviet era trade unions. LBAS is the biggest non-governmental organisation in Latvia which protects the interests of professional trade union members and employees on the branch and interbranch level. LBAS coordinates the cooperation between 23 independent Latvian trade unions, represents and protects the interests of its members in the national and international institutions, implements a joint working programme.

The purpose of LBAS activities is to protect the interests of trade union members. The main principle of operation is solidarity, i.e. joint coordinated actions of the affiliates. LBAS represents its members' interests and protects their rights in the socio-economic field.

Together with the government and Latvian Employers' Confederation, LBAS works in the National Tripartite Cooperation Council. LBAS observes the principles of social dialogue in the cooperation with the social partners.

LBAS participates in the elaboration of economic and social development programmes, in the evaluation of draft laws, in working groups on improvement of labour conditions, salaries, tariff policies, compulsory social insurance and social guaranties, healthcare as well as employment, vocational education and lifelong learning.

LBAS represents the interests of its members in:

- National Tripartite Cooperation Council and its Sub-councils;
- State and municipal institutions;
- courts.

LBAS provides consultations to the trade union members on concluding the collective agreements, participated in revision of labour disputes, social and economic discords. At present LBAS unites more than 15% of all workers of Latvian almost 2900 state, municipal and private enterprises.

LBAS is affiliated with the International Trade Union Confederation, the European Trade Union Confederation and the Baltic Sea Trade Union Network - BASTUN.
