= CSTC =

CSTC may mean:

- Calcutta State Transport Corporation
- Confédération Syndicale des Travailleurs de Centrafrique
- Confédération Syndicale des Travailleurs du Congo
- Cortico-striato-thalamocortical circuit, also known as cortico-basal ganglia-thalamo-cortical loop, a type of neural circuit in the brain
- Combined Security Transition Command – Afghanistan
