= Forum for the Cooperation of Trade Unions =

SzEF
- Forum for the Cooperation of Trade Unions
- Szakszervezetek Együttmöködési Fóruma
- Founded: June 1990
- Headquarters: Budapest, Hungary
- Location: Hungary
- Members: 274,000
- Key people: Endre Szabó, president
- Affiliations: ETUC

The Forum for the Cooperation of Trade Unions (SZEF) is a national trade union center in Hungary. With a membership of 274,000 the SZEF represents mainly white collar workers in education, social services and health care, cultural institutes and government agencies.

The SZEF is affiliated with the European Trade Union Confederation.
