= National Federation of Workers' Councils =

MOSz/NFWC
- National Federation of Workers' Councils
- Munkástanácsok Országos Szövetsége
- Founded: 1989
- Headquarters: Budapest, Hungary
- Location: Hungary
- Members: 56,000
- Key people: Imre Palkovics, president Jozsef Suhajda, secretary general
- Affiliations: ITUC, ETUC
- Website: www.munkastanacsok.hu

The National Federation of Workers' Councils (MOSz) is a national trade union center in Hungary. It was formed in 1989 and has a membership of 56,000 in 12 branches.

Most members are from small to medium-sized businesses in the private sector. The MOSz is affiliated with the International Trade Union Confederation, and the European Trade Union Confederation.
