= Revoluční odborové hnutí =

Labour union in Czechoslovakia

Revolutionary Trade Union Movement
- Revoluční odborové hnutí Revolučné odborové hnutie
- Succeeded: Czechoslovak Confederation of Trade Unions: Bohemian-Moravian Confederation of Trade Unions; Confederation of Trade Unions of the Slovak Republic
- Founded: 16 May 1946
- Dissolved: 3 March 1990
- Members: 10,000,000+
- Affiliations: WTUC

Revoluční odborové hnutí (Czech; Slovak: Revolučné odborové hnutie; lit. 'Revolutionary Trade Union Movement') (ROH) was a communist national trade union centre in Czechoslovakia from 1946 to 1990. In Communist Czechoslovakia (1948–1989) it was a monopolistic trade union, wherein the membership was often mandatory for employees of state industries.

== Foundation ==
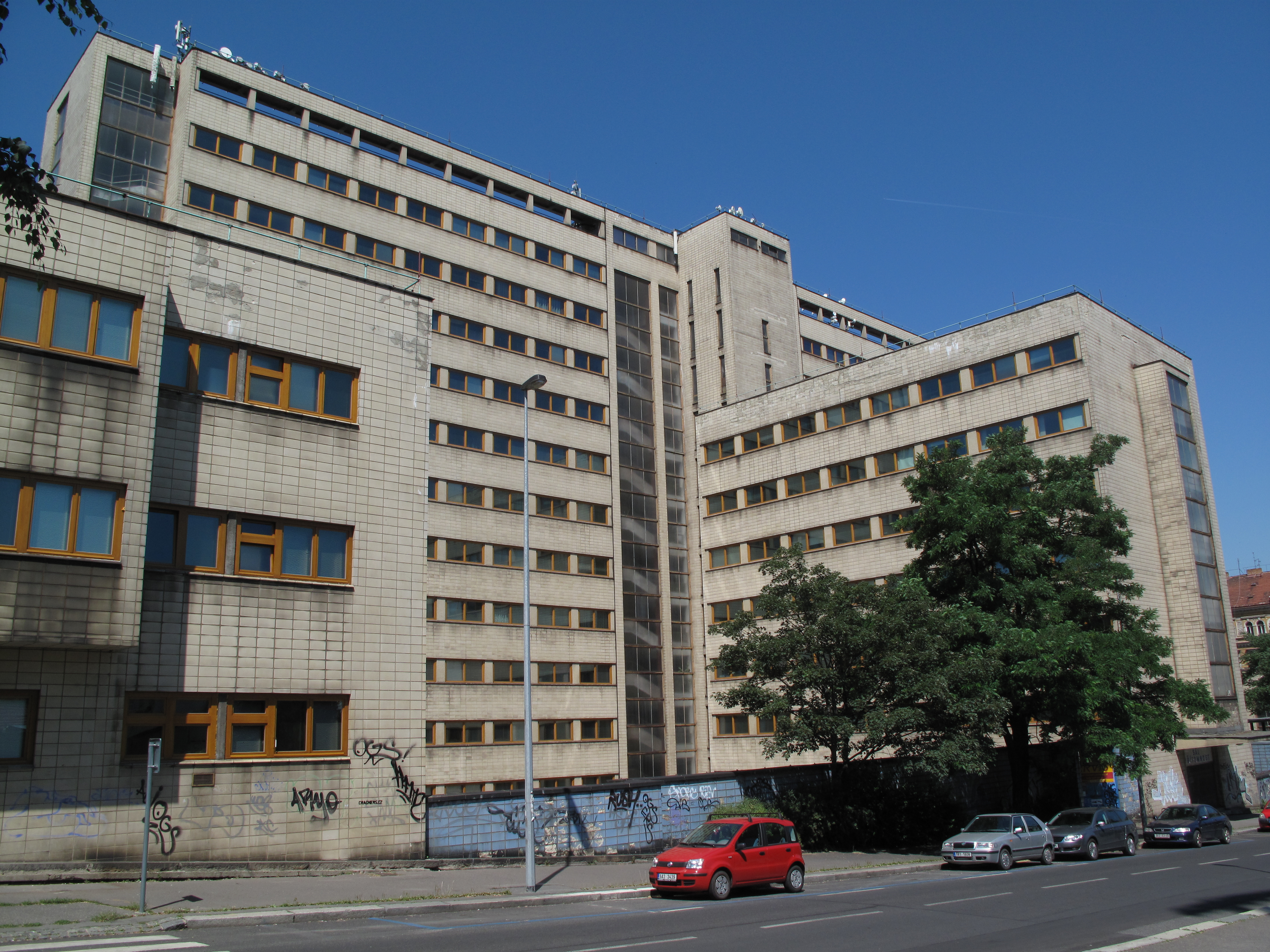
Former Building of Trade Unions in Prague-Žižkov

ROH was founded in the Czech Lands in 1946, emerging out of the factory councils and workers militias that evolve out of the wake of the Second World War. After World War II, communists became dominant in the trade union movement once the war ended. They were however not the sole political force in the initial phase of ROH, the Trade Union Department of the Communist Party was wary of 'syndicalist' tendencies in the factory councils.

In April 1946 the Slovak trade unions merged into ROH. The Slovak unions merged with their Czech counterparts, adopting the slogan "One factory - one trade union organization". However, during 1947 ROH membership in Slovakia dropped sharply for political and economical reason, ROH lost a third of its members in the area.

Antonín Zápotocký, a communist pre-war labour leader who had been imprisoned for six years during the war, became the chairman of ROH in June 1947. Evžen Erban, a left-wing Social Democrat, became the general secretary of ROH. In the leading body of ROH, the Central Trade Union Council (ÚRO), there were 94 communists, 18 Social Democrats, 6 National Socialists and 2 from the People's Party.

== Prague Spring ==
During the Prague Spring of 1968, ROH became somewhat more independent. However, developments in the trade union field were somewhat slower than in other organizations. In March 1968 hardline leaders were removed from their positions in ÚRO. In September 1968 ÚRO reaffirmed that the process of internal reforms and adoptions of new statues in the affiliated unions would continue. Between November 1968 and January 1969 some unions (like the Metal Workers' Union) threatened to launch strikes if the pro-reform leaders wouldn't be reinstated to their positions in the Communist Party.

Ahead of the 7th ROH congress, held March 4–5 March 1969, 75% of the delegates were elected from the affiliated unions through secret ballots (for the first time). The congress did steer a moderate course, as the trade union movement was pressured from both pro-reform sectors as well as Communist Party hardliners. In the ROH leadership elected at the congress, different political strands were represented. Karel Poláček was the ROH chairman at the time. Gradually, however, ROH returned to following the line of the Communist Party.

== Organization ==
ROH was organized along democratic centralist lines. The national leadership was the Central Trade Union Council (ÚRO). The organ leading ROH between ÚRO meetings was its 14-member presidium. In the districts, there were the District Trade Union Council (KOR). The KORs had around 20 members each, elected at District Trade Union Conferences.

ROH published the newspaper Práce.

As of August 1958 ROH had over 3 800 000 members.

In 1975, the following unions were affiliated:

Union	Membership
Trade Union of Agricultural Workers	378,200
Trade Union of Building and Building Materials Industry Workers	542,590
Trade Union of Chemical, Paper, Glass and Printing Industry Workers	305,863
Trade Union of Civil Employees of the Czechoslovak People's Army	Unknown
Trade Union of Commerce Employees	590,656
Trade Union of Employees in Government and Financial Institutions and Foreign Trade	223,854
Trade Union of Food Industry Workers	197,722
Trade Union of Health Workers	320,000
Trade Union of Metal Workers	1,147,853
Trade Union of Post and Telecommunications Workers	119,349
Trade Union of Railway Workers	276,995
Trade Union of Textile, Clothing and Leather Industry Workers	384,909
Trade Union of Transport and Road Economy	206,000
Trade Union of Woodworking Industry, Forestry and Water Conservancy Workers	220,065
Trade Union of Workers in Art, Culture and Social Organisations	150,000
Trade Union of Workers in Communal Enterprises	289,418
Trade Union of Workers in Education and Science	415,695
Trade Union of Workers in the Mining and Power Generating Industries	320,318

== International cooperation ==
ROH was a member of the World Federation of Trade Unions. The WFTU had its headquarters in Prague.

== Later period ==
In 1989, autonomous trade unions and strike committees surged in Czechoslovakia, which called for the dissolution of ROH. A parallel Trade Union Coordination Centre was formed. ROH tried to manage the situation by declaring its independence from the Communist Party. The Slovak branch of ROH decided to subordinate itself to the Coordination Centre. The Czech ROH organization hesitated somewhat, but at a trade union conference held 2–3 March 1990 ROH dissolved itself. In its place a new trade union federation, ČSKOS was founded.

== See also ==
- Bohemian-Moravian Confederation of Trade Unions
- Confederation of Trade Unions of the Slovak Republic
