= Democratic Labour Federation of Cyprus =

Trade union centre in Cyprus

DEOK
- Democratic Labour Federation of Cyprus (DEOK)
- ΔΗΜΟΚΡΑΤΙΚΗ ΕΡΓΑΤΙΚΗ ΟΜΟΣΠΟΝΔΙΑ ΚΥΠΡΟΥ
- Founded: 1962
- Headquarters: Nicosia, Cyprus
- Location: Cyprus
- Members: 7500
- Key people: Stelios Christodoulou, President
- Affiliations: ETUC, ITUC
- Website: deok.org.cy

The Democratic Labour Federation of Cyprus (DEOK) is a trade union centre in Cyprus. It is affiliated with the European Trade Union Confederation and the International Trade Union Confederation. The trade union also has close ties with EDEK.
