= Organization of Cooperating Autonomous Trade Unions =

Trade union federation in Suriname

OSAV
- Organization of Cooperating Autonomous Trade Unions
- Organisatie van Samenwerkende Autonome Vakbonden
- Founded: 1985
- Headquarters: Paramaribo, Suriname
- Location: Suriname
- Affiliations: ITUC

The Organization of Cooperating Autonomous Trade Unions (OSAV) is a trade union federation in Suriname. It was founded in 1985 out of a leadership dispute at the General Alliance of Labour Unions in Suriname.

The OSAV is affiliated with the International Trade Union Confederation.
