= BSSF =

BSSF may refer to:

- Special Security Force Command, a paramilitary security force in Bahrain
- Bangladesh Sanjukta Sramik Federation, a trade union federation in Bangladesh
- The Brandeis School of San Francisco, a K-8 school in San Francisco, California
