= Digital Platform Workers' Trade Union =

Trade union of internet platform workers in Croatia

SRDP
- Digital Platform Workers’ Trade Union
- Sindikat radnika digitalnih platformi
- Founded: June 2021
- Location: Croatia
- Key people: Mile Krivokuća, President; Iva Filipović, Secretary General
- Affiliations: SSSH
- Website: srdp.hr

The Digital Platform Workers’ Trade Union (Croatian: Sindikat radnika digitalnih platformi, SRDP) is a trade union of internet-based platform workers, including ridesharing and food delivery, in Croatia. It is affiliated with the Union of Autonomous Trade Unions of Croatia.

== History ==
SRDP was founded in June 2021 to fight for better working conditions in a sector with growing importance in Croatia. Two large problems the union announced it would be tackling were the lack of legislation on platform work and the status of "aggregators", medium-sized businesses who organised workers' access to platforms. The union also cited concerns over sick leave, vacations, accident insurance and the partaking in business risk.

In October, SRDP organised a warning strike of Uber drivers after they were unable to speak to an Uber representative after two weeks without pay.
