= Trade unions in Palau =

Trade unions in Palau. Although the Constitution of Palau recognizes the right to free association, there is no specific mention of trade union rights, including the right of collective bargaining.

Palau is a member of the International Labour Organization since 2012, but has since (as of April 2024) only ratified one of the 10 fundamental conventions, C182 - Worst Forms of Child Labour Convention, 1999 (No. 182).

There are no functioning trade unions in the country.

ICTUR reports that there is no right to strike, and none have been reported in recent years.
