= Association of Secondary Teachers, Ireland =

Trade union in Ireland

ASTI
- Association of Secondary Teachers, Ireland
- Cumann na Meánmhúinteoirí, Éire
- Founded: 17 March 1909; 117 years ago in Fermoy, Ireland
- Founders: Thomas MacDonagh; Patrick Kennedy; Éamon de Valera
- Headquarters: Dublin, Ireland
- Location: Ireland
- Members: 18,500 (2022)
- Affiliations: Irish Congress of Trade Unions; Education International; European Trade Union Committee for Education
- Website: www.asti.ie

The Association of Secondary Teachers, Ireland (ASTI) is a trade union for secondary school teachers in Ireland. It is a member of the Irish Congress of Trade Unions. The union represents 18,500 teachers in schools attended by 80% of all second-level students.

== Purpose ==
The ASTI represents teachers on educational issues and working conditions. The objects and aims of the ASTI are:

- to promote second-level education
- to unite and organise all second-level teachers
- to promote and protect teachers' interests
- to maintain and improve teachers' conditions of employment

The ASTI acts as a professional advocate for second level teachers, offers legal protection to its members, campaigns for improved working conditions and ensures continuing professional development for teachers providing research facility for teachers where necessary. The association will also provide a team of experienced industrial relations negotiators to assist teachers facing difficulties at school. The ASTI set up a Credit Union in 1984.

== History ==
The ASTI began on 17 March 1909, at a meeting called by teachers of St Colman's College, Fermoy. There had been an Irish National Teachers Organisation (INTO) since 1868 which had been successful in gaining better working conditions and pay for their members. At the time, conditions for secondary teachers were very poor with men earning about £80 a year and women a little over half that. One of the aims of the association was to raise the status of teachers in the community.

The main force behind the formation of the union was Patrick Kennedy, a teacher at St Colman's. Founding members included such national figures as Easter Rising leader Thomas MacDonagh, whose godfather was Kennedy's father and who was a close friend, and the future Taoiseach and President of Ireland, Éamon de Valera.

In 1911 the decision was taken to establish a women's section within the ASTI, which was named the Women Teachers' Association (WTA). The role and social acceptance of female teachers changed dramatically from a place where female secondary teachers had to retire upon marriage to a place where women became president of the union.

The history of the union is documented in the book Unlikely Radicals. The organisation struggled with the development of education, the role of the Catholic church, and the changes in state which occurred while trying to include as much of the population as possible in education.

== General Secretary ==
The General Secretary represents the interests of the members of the union on topics such as their salary, conditions of employment and education at a national and international level. The General Secretary manages the daily business of the ASTI and ensures that ASTI policy is appropriately carried out. This post is not elected annually but rather is appointed as a full-time position.

Kieran Mulvey was the General secretary of the ASTI from 1983 until he was replaced by Charlie Lennon in 1991. On Lennon's retirement in 2004 John White became acting General Secretary of the ASTI and was appointed in 2005. Pat King replaced White in September 2010. Kieran Christie was General Secretary as of 1 January 2016until September 2026, when Linda Kelly succeeded him.

Year	General Secretary
1909–1911	P.F. Condon
1912	G. Dempsey
1913	Mr. Gallagher
1914	Mr. Mellett
1915	–
1916	W.J. Williams
1917	A. McHugh
1918	–
1919	–
1920–1937	T.J. Burke
Sep 1937 – Jan 1938	J. Carey (acting)
Jan 1938 – May 1938	W. Glynn (temporary)
1938–1957	Florence Quirke
Aug 1957 – May 1958	Daniel Buckley and Cathal O'Gara (joint honorary secretaries)
1958–1983	Maire MacDonagh
1983–1991	Kieran Mulvey
1991–2004	Charlie Lennon
2004–2010	John White
2010–2015	Pat King
2016–2026	Kieran Christie
2026–Present	Linda Kelly

== President ==
The president of the union is elected at the annual convention and takes office on 1 August of that year. Unlike the General Secretary the President is always a teacher and takes a leave of absence from their teaching role for the duration of their term.

Year	President	Year	President	Year	President	Year	President
1909	W. S. Cooney	1910	P. J. Kennedy	1911	P. J. Kennedy	1912	W. Johnston
1913	G. A. Watson	1914	G. A. Watson	1915	G. A. Watson	1916	G. A. Watson
1917	W. J. Williams	1918	G. A. Watson	1919	T. J. Burke	1920	L. Murray
1921	B. Gillespie	1922	B. Gillespie	1923	M. Kinsella/A. Ruttledge	1924	J. H. Kane
1925	T. P. Waller	1926	A. J. Mulligan	1927	J. J. Murphy	1928	G. P. Duggan
1929	J. H. Kane	1930	T. O'Beirne	1931	T. O'Beirne	1932	T. O'Donoghue
1933	C. L. Dillon	1934	G. P. Daly	1935	J. H. Kane	1936	J. H. Kane
1937	F. Kennedy	1938	T. P. Waller	1939	T. P. Waller	1940	T. J. Boylan
1941	T. J. Boylan	1942	T. O'Donoghue	1943	C. L. Dillon	1944	C. L. Dillon
1945	T. Walsh	1946	Daniel Buckley	1947	O. P. Ward	1948	O. P. Ward
1949	W.G. Kirkpatrick	1950	S. Ó Mathúna	1951	Dónall Ó Conalláin	1952	T. C. Coppinger
1953	W. Meyler	1954	P. J. O'Reilly	1955	G. Ó Maoilmhichil	1956	P. J. Hardiman
1957	L. Comerford	1958	N. Kelleher	1959	C. L. Dillon, John Wilson	1960	T. Murphy
1961	P. S. Gillman	1962	George Lyons	1963	D. Ó Mhurchú	1964	P. Finnegan
1965	Daniel Buckley	1966	J. A. Brommell	1967	J. A. Brommell	1968	H. Duffy
1969	M. Sheedy	1970	Tom O'Dea	1971	Pádraig Ó Riordáin	1972	Kevin Meehan
1973	Pierce Purcell	1974	L. Hogan	1975	J. A. "Alfie" Sheehy	1976	M. MacCormack
1977	D. Nolan	1978	D. Nolan	1979	M. MacCarthy	1980	D. Barry
1981	T. Boland	1982	M. Walsh	1983	R. Kennedy	1984	H. Collins
1985	L. O'Flaherty	1986	J. White	1987	D. Quish	1988	K. O'Sullivan
1989	E. O'Allmhurain	1990	J. Costello	1991	W. Ruane	1992	J. Whyte
1993	M. Dowling Maher	1994	S. Higgins	1995	T. Francis	1996	J. Mulcahy
1997	J. Hurley	1998	M. Corely	1999	B. O'Sullivan	2000	D. McCluskey
2001	C. Fitzpatrick	2002	P. J. Sheehy	2003	P. Cahill	2004	S. Hall
2005	S. Parsons	2006	M. Freeley	2007	P. Wroe	2008	P. Hurley
2009	J. Moran	2010	J. Keane	2011	B. Broderick	2012	G. Breslin
2013	S. Maguire	2014	P. Irwin	2015	M. G. Ní Chiarba	2016	E. Byrne
2017	G. Curtin	2018	B. Lynch	2019	D. MacDonald	2020	A. Piggott
2021	E. Dennehy	2022	M. Duggan	2023	G. O'Brien	2024	D. Cremin
2025	P. Curley	2026	R. Bell				

== See also ==
- Education in the Republic of Ireland
