= Federation of Trade Unions of Macedonia =

SSM
- Federation of Trade Unions of Macedonia
- Headquarters: Skopje, North Macedonia
- Location: North Macedonia
- Affiliations: ETUC (Observer status)
- Website: http://www.ssm.org.mk

The Federation of Trade Unions of Macedonia (Macedonian: Сојуз на синдикатите на Македонија, Sojuz na sindikatite na Makedonija, abbreviated as ССМ in Cyrillic text, transliterated as SSM) is a national trade union center in North Macedonia. It is the successor to the official trade unions of the former Yugoslavian era. The federation has 18 affiliated sectoral unions. Its president is Zivko Mitrevski.

The SSM is not affiliated at the international level, but holds observer status with the European Trade Union Confederation.
