= ZSSS =

ZSSS may refer to:

- ICAO code for Shanghai Hongqiao International Airport
- Association of Free Trade Unions of Slovenia
