= Cyprus Workers' Confederation =

Trade union centre in Cyprus

SEK
- Cyprus Workers' Confederation
- Συνομοσπονδία Εργαζομένων Κύπρου Synomospondia Ergazomenon Kyprou (Greek); Kıbrıs İşçi Konfederasyonu (Turkish)
- Founded: October 1944
- Headquarters: Nicosia, Cyprus
- Location: Cyprus
- Members: 66,300
- Key people: Andreas Matsas, general secretary
- Affiliations: ITUC, ETUC
- Website: www.sek.org.cy

The Cyprus Workers' Confederation (SEK) is a trade union centre in Cyprus. It is affiliated with the International Trade Union Confederation, and the European Trade Union Confederation.

The federations, which are members of SEK, represent and professionally express workers in sectors of the economy. Their main duty is to negotiate and achieve collective agreements.

The professional federations, members of SEK, are as follows:

- Federation of Private Sector Workers
- Federation of Industrial Workers
- Federation of Builders, Miners and Relevant Professions
- Federation of Transport, Petroleum and Agriculture Workers
- Federation of Government, Military and Civil Services Workers
- Federation of Semi-Governmental Associations
- Federation of Hotel Industry Workers
