= Samoa Trade Union Congress =

National trade union center in Samoa

STUC
- Samoa Trade Union Congress
- Founded: 1995
- Headquarters: Apia, Samoa
- Location: Samoa
- Members: 3000 (approx.)
- Key people: Tutonu Vaomua, president Su'a Viliamu Sio, secretary general
- Affiliations: ITUC

The Samoa Trade Union Congress (STUC) is a national trade union center in Samoa. It was founded in 1995 and has a membership of approximately 3000.

The STUC is affiliated with the International Trade Union Confederation.
