= SSSH =

SSSH may refer to:

- Taipei Municipal Song Shan Senior High School, a high school in Taipei, Taiwan
- Union of Autonomous Trade Unions of Croatia (Savez samostalnih sindikata Hrvatske)
