= 2011 Slovenian part-time work referendum =

- 10 April 2011
- Are you in favor of the implementation of the Small Work Act (ZMD), which was adopted by the National Assembly at its session on 16 November 2010?

Results
Choice	Votes	%
Yes	115,063	19.93%
No	462,198	80.07%
Valid votes	577,261	99.52%
Invalid or blank votes	2,773	0.48%
Total votes	580,034	100.00%
Registered voters/turnout	1,707,534	33.97%

A referendum on a law on part-time work was held in Slovenia on 10 April 2011. The law was rejected by 80% of voters.

== Background ==
On 26 October 2012 the National Assembly passed a law on part-time work by a vote of 39 to 32. However, it was then rejected by the National Council by a vote of 20 to 14 on 2 November. The National Assembly approved the law again by a vote of 47 to 28 on 16 November. The National Council then attempted to force a referendum on the law, but although the motion passed 18–7 in favour, at least 21 votes were required.

The law would allow unemployed people, students and pensioners to work for up to 60 hours a month and 720 hours a year. However, they would be paid less and have fewer employment rights, including no right to reimbursement for meals at work and commuting costs, as well as no sick or parental leave. They would also get no annual leave entitlement and no severance pay.

The ŠOS student organisation and the Association of Free Trade Unions of Slovenia (ZSSS) both opposed the new law, as it would create a new class of employees who received fewer social benefits. Between 3 January and 6 February 2011 the ŠOS and the ZSSS collected 47,000 signatures, more than the 40,000 required to hold a referendum under article 90 of the Slovenian constitution. As a result, the National Assembly fixed the date for a referendum on 17 February.

== Results ==
Ali ste za to, da se uveljavi Zakon o malem delu (ZMD), ki ga je sprejel Državni zbor na seji dne 16. novembra 2010?

Are you for the law on part-time work that the National Assembly passed in a sitting on 16 November 2010 coming into force?

Choice	Votes	%
For	115,063	19.93
Against	462,198	80.07
Invalid/blank votes	2,773	–
Total	580,034	100
Registered voters/turnout	1,707,534	33.99
Source: Direct Democracy
