= National Confederation of Hungarian Trade Unions =

Former Hungrarian trade union

MSzOSz
- National Confederation of Hungarian Trade Unions
- Magyar Szakszervezetek Országos Szövetsége
- Founded: March 1990
- Headquarters: Budapest, Hungary
- Location: Hungary
- Members: 465,000
- Key people: László Sándor, president
- Affiliations: ITUC, ETUC, TUAC
- Website: www.mszosz.hu

The National Confederation of Hungarian Trade Unions (MSzOSz) is a national trade union center in Hungary. It was formed in 1990 and has a membership of 465,000 active members and 250,000 pensioners and apprentices.

The MSzOSz is affiliated with the International Trade Union Confederation, and the European Trade Union Confederation.
