= Pio Chiaruzzi =

Sammarinese politician

Pio Chiaruzzi (San Marino, 11 August 1949) is a Sammarinese politician.

From the 1960s and the 1970s, Chiaruzzi has been an active activist in several cultural and political associations such as Circolo politico-culturale San Marino 2000, Confederazione Sammarinese del Lavoro (CSdL) and Partito Comunista Sammarinese (PCS). In 1976, he was one of the founders of the cooperative, Titancoop.

During the 1980s, he worked in the Social Security of San Marino, during the 1990s in Labour Offices and in 1997 was one of the founders of the association "Manifesto per una cultura riformista". In 2000, he worked for the state agencies of industry and public treasury.

== Publications ==
- Labirinti da lui fondata, 1997-2001
