= Aado Slutsk =

Estonian sports personnel (1918–2006)

Aado Slutsk (incorrectly Aadu Slutsk; 17 July 1918 Riga – 28 September 2006 Tallinn) was an Estonian sport figure.

1936-1938 he studied mathematics at Tartu University. Beginning in 1940 he worked as a journalist. 1964-1981 he was the head of Estonian Radio. He was one of the founders of Estonian Association of Journalists. 1976-1980 he was the head of Tallinn Sailing Regatta's Press Centre (Estonian: Tallinna purjeregati pressikeskus). 1989-1998 he was a member of Estonian Olympic Committee, since 1999 an honorary member.

Awards:

- 1971: Estonian SSR merited journalist
- 2004: Order of the White Star, V class
