= Frank Bsirske =

German politician (born 1952)

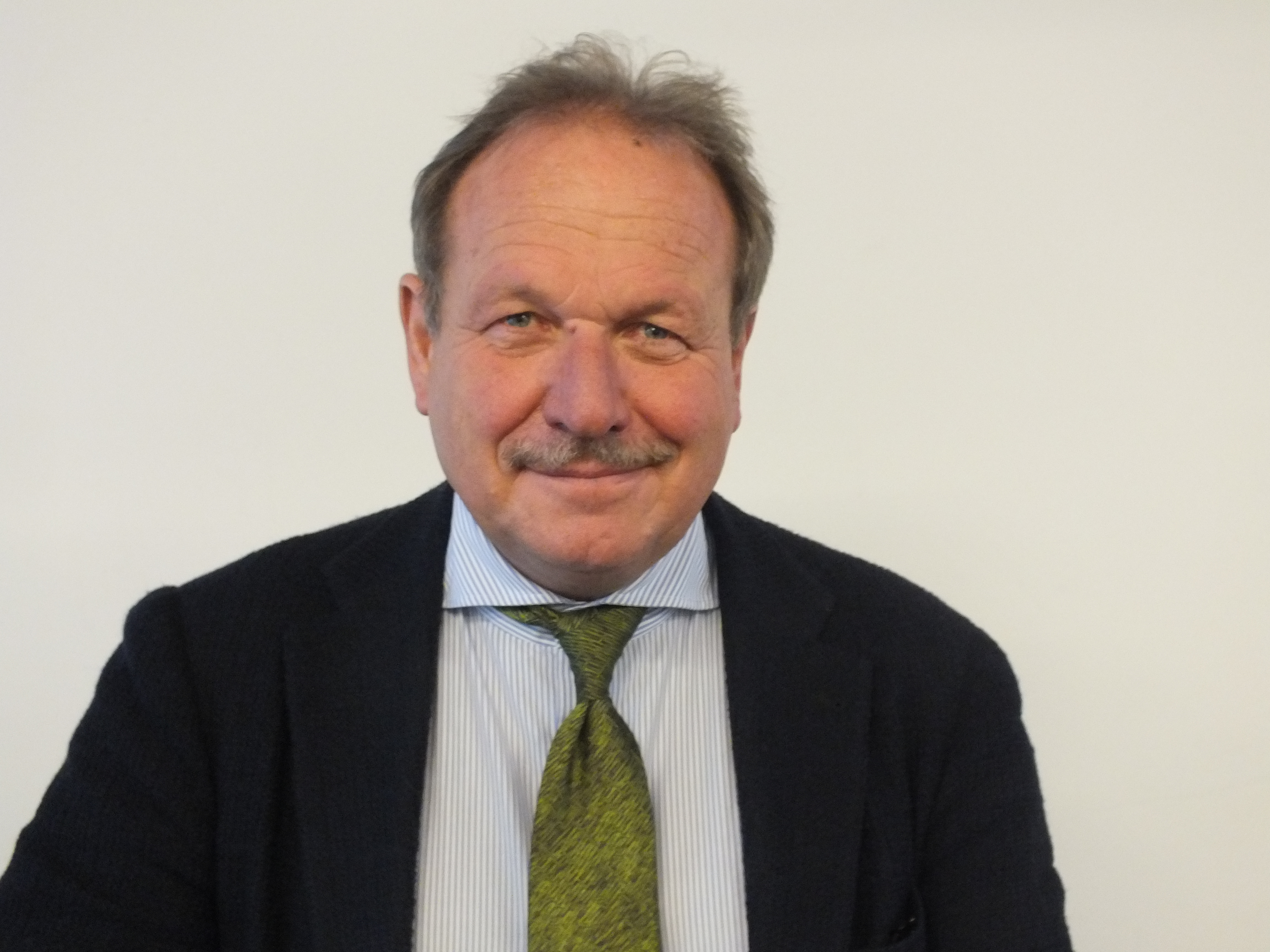
- Bsirske in 2018

Member of the Bundestag
- Incumbent
- Assumed office 2021

Personal details
- Born: 10 February 1952 (age 74) Helmstedt, West Germany (now Germany)
- Party: Alliance 90/The Greens
- Education: Free University of Berlin

Frank Bsirske (born 10 February 1952) is a German trade unionist and politician of Alliance 90/The Greens who has been serving as a member of the Bundestag since 2021. From 2001 to 2019, he was the chairman of the United Services Trade Union (ver.di).

== Early life and education ==
Bsirske was born 1952 in the West German town of Heiligenstadt. He later studied political science at Free University of Berlin.

== Chair of ver.di, 2001–2019 ==
From 2001 to 2019, Bsirske served as the chairman of the United Services Trade Union (ver.di). In this capacity, he was also member of the board of the European Trade Union Confederation (ETUC) and the president of UNI Europa.

In 2015, Federal Minister for Economic Affairs and Energy Sigmar Gabriel appointed Bsirske to the government's advisory board on the Transatlantic Trade and Investment Partnership (TTIP).

== Political career ==
Bsirske was elected to the Bundestag in 2021, representing the Helmstedt – Wolfsburg district. In parliament, he has since been serving on the Ministry of Social Affairs and Labour.

In the negotiations to form a so-called traffic light coalition of the Social Democratic Party (SPD), the Green Party and the Free Democratic Party (FDP) following the 2021 German elections, Bsirske was part of his party's delegation in the working group on labour policy, co-chaired by Hubertus Heil, Katharina Dröge and Johannes Vogel.

In September 2024, Bsirske announced that he would not stand in the 2025 federal elections but instead resign from active politics by the end of the parliamentary term.

== Other activities ==
=== Corporate boards ===
- Commerzbank, Member of the Sustainability Advisory Board (since 2022)
- Deutsche Vermögensberatung (DVAG), member of the advisory board (since 2021)
- Innogy, member of the Supervisory Board (2016–2019)
- Deutsche Bank, member of the supervisory board (2013–2021)
- Postbank, member of the supervisory board (2010–2021)
- RWE, member of the supervisory board (2001–2021)
- KfW, member of the Board of Supervisory Directors (2006–2018)
- IBM Germany, member of the supervisory board (–2017)
- Lufthansa, member of the supervisory board (–2013)

=== Non-profit organizations ===
- German Federation for the Environment and Nature Conservation (BUND), member
- Tennis Borussia Berlin, member

== Political positions ==
In 2016, Bsirske criticized the German government's support for the EU's Comprehensive Economic and Trade Agreement (CETA) with Canada.

In 2022, Bsirske went against the party line and voted against the Scholz government's motion to change Germany's constitution to allow for a credit-based special defense fund of 100 billion euros ($107.35 billion) proposed after Russia's invasion of Ukraine.

== Personal life ==
Bsirske has been married to Bettina Jankovsky since 1993. From 2002 to 2021, the couple lived in Berlin's Charlottenburg district before moving to Dahlem district.
