= Kastra =

Kastra may refer to:

- Kastra (musical artist), American DJ, music producer and songwriter
- August Kastra (1878–1941), Estonian journalist and trade union leader
- Castra ad Fluvium Frigidum, a Roman fortress called Kastra in Slovenian

== See also ==
- Epsilon Capricorni, a star sometimes called Castra
