= Federazione delle Leghe coloniche =

Federazione delle Leghe coloniche ('Federation of Farmers' Leagues') was a farmers' union in San Marino. The organization was founded in 1945. It was linked to the Sammarinese Communist Party. The federation was the first member organization of San Marino Confederation of Labour (CSdL).

The federation held its fourth congress on March 31, 1957.
