= Confederation of Estonian Trade Unions =

Umbrella organization of Estonian trade unions

EAKL
- Estonian Trade Union Confederation
- Eesti Ametiühingute Keskliit
- Founded: 1917, as Central bureau of Trade Unions (Ametiühingute Keskbüroo); 1927, as Confederation of Estonian Trade Unions (Eestimaa Töölisühingute Keskliit); 1990, as ...
- Headquarters: Tallinn, Estonia
- Location: Estonia
- Members: 21000
- Key people: Peep Peterson, President
- Affiliations: ITUC, ETUC
- Website: www.eakl.ee

Estonian Trade Union Confederation (Estonian: Eesti Ametiühingute Keskliit, EAKL) is a trade union centre in Estonia. It is affiliated with the International Trade Union Confederation (ITUC), and the European Trade Union Confederation (ETUC).

The Estonian Trade Union Confederation (EAKL) comprises 16 branch unions that represent state and municipal government officials, education workers, health care workers, transport workers (including road, railway, sea and air transport), industrial workers (including energy, light industry, food industry, timber and metal industry) and people employed in the service sector (postal, communication, trade, hotel and cleaning sector workers, etc.).

The EAKL operates to ensure that the principle of social justice is respected in society. The EAKL represents employees’ interests in collective agreements and protects employees’ rights in employment relations, consults employers on developing a sustainable labour market and the government on developing a socially sustainable economic model. The EAKL participates actively in the formation of legislation and policies in order to guarantee the social security of employees and a healthy working environment.

Another important goal of the EAKL is to guarantee a sustainable trade union movement in Estonia. To achieve this the EAKL:

- Promotes the unionisation of employees into trade unions and the participation of employees in social dialogue
- Helps to harmonise and strengthen trade union structures
- Coordinates the cooperation of member unions based on the principles of common identity and mutual respect
- Gives advice on legal matters and issues related to employment, wages and social security, and participates in solving labour disputes and arguments
- Organises trade union training, public events and meetings
- Publishes information materials to introduce trade union activities and work-related legal acts
- Takes part in international trade union cooperation

Structure of EAKL

The trade union movement is founded on those active workers who have created a trade union at their workplace or joined an existing trade union. Though trade unions may act independently, in order to achieve more strength and a feeling of greater unity, unions in one sector frequently form a union of associated trade unions. In Estonia there are almost 30 branch unions that represent trade unions of a certain economic sector or profession. 19 such unions have joined together to form the Estonian Trade Union Confederation.

Congress

Once every four years the highest decision-making body of the Confederation - the Congress – gathers to take the most important decisions and elect the President of the Confederation for a four-year period.

Executive Committee

Between these Congresses, the role of Congress is carried out by the Executive Committee, which usually meets three times a year. The Executive Committee comprises the representatives of the member unions of the Confederation for a four-year term. The Executive Committee decides the size of the Management Board and elects the members of the Board; in addition, various policy committees are formed by the decision of the Executive Committee. At the moment, the following committees join together experts from branch unions and the Secretariat of the Confederation: Development Committee, Legal Policy Committee, Social and Wage Policy Committee, Equal Rights Committee and Youth Committee.

Management Board

The Management Board is the permanent management body of the EAKL, which is elected for a four-year term. The Management Board includes a minimum of seven and a maximum of thirteen members, including the President of the EAKL. A member of the Management Board may not simultaneously act as a member of the EAKL Executive Committee.

Secretariat

The Secretariat is the permanent working body of the EAKL, the task of which is to prepare the drafts of the Confederation’s documents and Management Board’s decisions, organise the cooperation between the members of the Confederation and carry out the decisions of the Management Board and the goals set by the action plan at the Congress. In addition, the Secretariat of the Confederation coordinates the training activities of trade union members and trade union representatives, participates in the solving of labour disputes and organises the international cooperation and public relations of the Confederation.

Regional Departments

There are six Regional Departments that support the trade union activities across Estonia – the departments of Ida-Viru County, Lääne-Viru County, Tartu County, Viljandi County, Pärnu County and Saare County. The departments represent and protect the interests of trade unions in relations with employers and their unions at local level and in matters of work, labour market policy and social security at municipal government level. In addition, the departments promote the trade union movement, help to create new trade unions and organise new members in their own region.

== See also ==
- Estonian Employees' Unions' Confederation

== Sources ==
- ICTUR; et al., eds. (2005). Trade Unions of the World (6th ed.). London, UK: John Harper Publishing. ISBN 0-9543811-5-7.
