= European Federation of Food, Agriculture and Tourism Trade Unions =

The European Federation of Food, Agriculture and Tourism Trade Unions (EFFAT) is a European industry federation of trade unions in several related industries.

== History ==
The European Federation of Food, Catering and Allied Workers' Unions within the IUF, and the European Federation of Agricultural Workers' Unions, agreed in 1993 in principle to merge. The merger process was only initiated in 1998, and was finalised at a congress in Luxembourg on 11 December 2000. The new organisation was described both as an autonomous organisation, and as a regional organisation of the International Union of Food, Agricultural, Hotel, Restaurant, Catering, Tobacco and Allied Workers' Associations.

As of 2002, the federation had 120 affiliates in 35 countries, representing a total of 1.8 million members. In addition to workers in the food, agriculture and tourism sectors, these also include unions of domestic workers.

== Leadership ==
=== General Secretaries ===
2000: Harald Wiedenhofer
2019: Kristjan Bragason
2024: Enrico Somaglia

=== Presidents ===
2000: Uliano Stendardi
2011: Bruno Vanonni
2015: Therese Guovelin
2019: Malin Ackholt
2024: Annika Rönni-Sällinen
