= European industry federation =

A European industry federation (EIF) is a trade union organisation operating at European sectoral level, comparable to and sometimes part of the global union federations. They are the social partners recognized by the European Commission as acting on behalf of employees in their sectors for the purposes of European social dialogue.

== List of EIFs affiliated to the European Trade Union Confederation ==
The following is a list of EIFs affiliated to the European Trade Union Confederation (ETUC):

- European Arts and Entertainment Alliance (EAEA)
- European Confederation of Police (EUROCOP)
- European Federation of Building and Woodworkers (EFBWW/FETBB)
- European Federation of Food, Agriculture and Tourism Trade Unions (EFFAT)
- European Federation of Journalists (EFJ/FEJ)
- European Federation of Public Service Unions (EPSU)
- European Transport Workers' Federation (ETF)
- European Trade Union Committee for Education (ETUCE/CSEE)
- IndustriALL – European Trade Union
- UNI Europa
