= All-Ukrainian Union of Workers Solidarity "VOLYA" =

Ukrainian Catholic Union

All-Ukrainian Union of Workers Solidarity
- Всеукраїнське об'єднання солідарності трудівників
- Abbreviation: VOLYA, ВОЛЯ
- Established: 1989; 37 years ago
- Type: Trade union
- Location: Ukraine
- Origins: Catholic trade unions
- Members: 151,120 (2012)
- Official language: Ukrainian
- Affiliations: International Trade Union Confederation

The All-Ukrainian Union of Workers' Solidarity "VOLYA"/"VOST" (Ukrainian: Всеукраїнське об'єднання солідарності трудівників "ВОЛЯ") is a trade union representing Catholic workers in Ukraine.

The union was established in 1989 and affiliated to the World Confederation of Labour. By the end of the 1990s, it claimed a membership of 50,000. In 2013/2014, it took part in the Euromaidan movement.

The union how seen a period of growth with it now having a total of 151,120 members as of 2012, and became an affiliate to the International Trade Union Confederation after the merger of the World Confederation of Labour and the International Confederation of Free Trade Unions.
