= Luca Visentini =

Author and poet

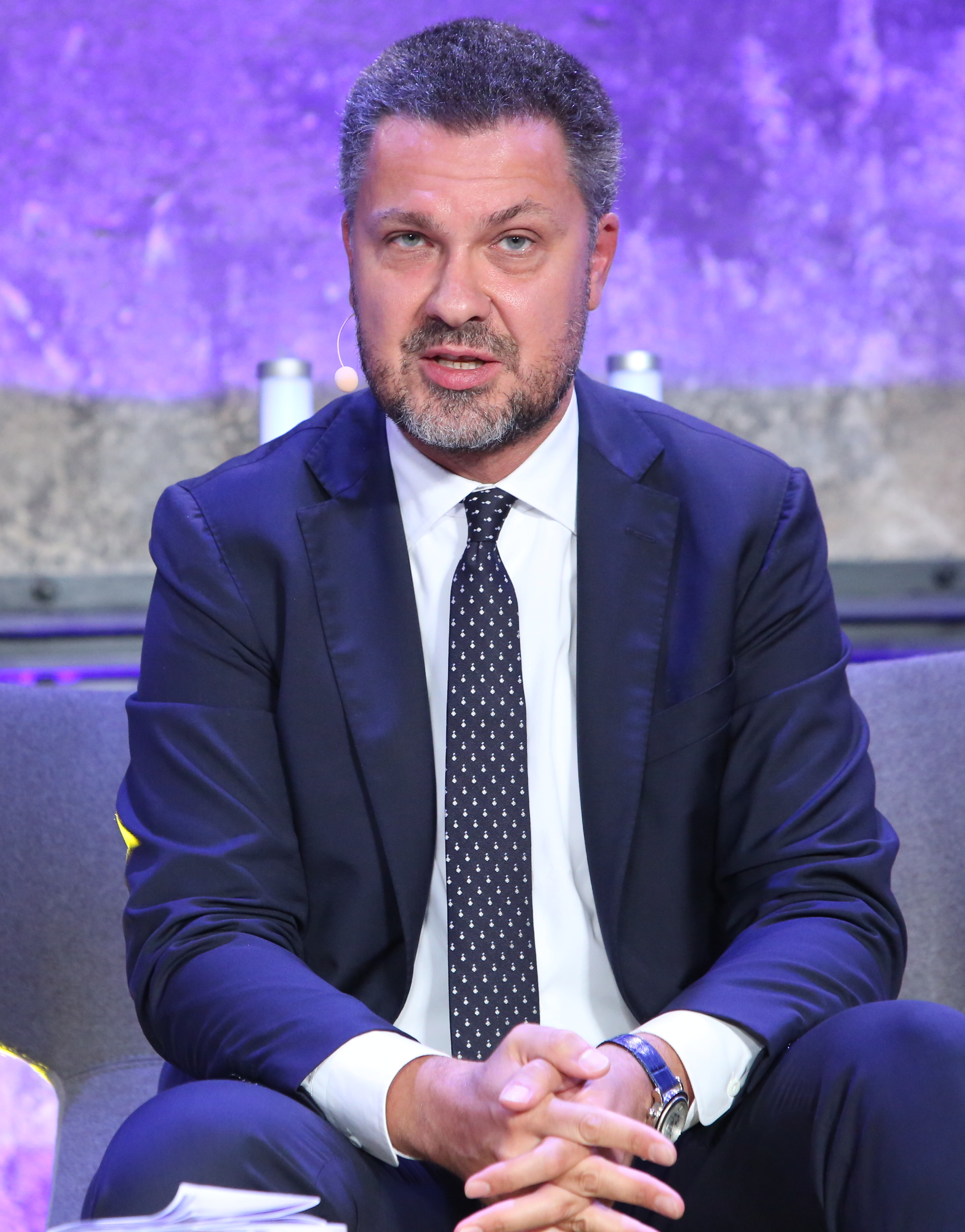

3rd General Secretary of the International Trade Union Confederation
- In office 21 November 2022 – 11 March 2023
- Preceded by: Sharan Burrow
- Succeeded by: Luc Triangle

Personal details
- Born: 1969 (age 56–57) Udine, Italy
- Education: University of Trieste
- Profession: Trade unionist

Luca Visentini (born 1969) is an Italian trade unionist. Elected general secretary of the International Trade Union Confederation (ITUC) in November 2022, he was suspended on 14 December 2022 following his arrest and conditional release in relation to the Qatar corruption scandal at the European Parliament. On 11 March 2023, the ITUC General Council voted to dismiss him for accepting funds from Antonio Panzeri.

He was previously the General Secretary of the European Trade Union Confederation (ETUC). He was reelected at the ETUC Congress in Vienna in May 2019, having been first elected in 2015. He has been active in the European trade union movement since the late 1980s, at regional, national and European Union levels.

== Background ==
After studying philosophy at the University of Trieste, in 1989, he joined the Unione Italiana de Lavoro (UIL), initially taking responsibility for the union's youth work. In the same year he was selected as General Secretary of UIL's Federation for Tourism, Trade and Services in Friuli-Venezia Giulia.

In 1996, he became General Secretary of UIL in Friuli-Venezia Giulia and a member of the union's national steering and executive committees, as well as General Secretary of the UIL Confederal Chamber of Labour of Trieste. His work covered a wide range of issues including collective bargaining and wages, social dialogue, industrial, labour market and economic policy, social security and public services, as well as communications and human resource management.

The following year, he became active at the European level as President of the Inter-Regional Trade Union Council (IRTUC) linking Friuli-Venezia Giulia, Veneto and Croatia, and a member of the ETUC IRTUCs Coordination Committee. From 2007-2011 he was committee Vice-President and served on the ETUC's Economic and Employment Committee.

== European Trade Union Confederation, 2011–2022 ==
Visentini was elected as ETUC Confederal Secretary at the 12th ETUC Congress in Athens in May 2011. His responsibilities included: Collective bargaining and wage policy; Migration and mobility; Education and training; EU budget, structural funds, economic and social cohesion, regional policy; IRTUCs and the EURES Network.

In October 2015, he was elected as ETUC General Secretary. He was re-elected at the Congress in Vienna, in May 2019.

== International Trade Union Confederation, 2022–2023 ==
Luca Visentini was elected as ITUC General Secretary at the 5th ITUC World Congress in Melbourne, Australia, 17–22 November 2022. He was suspended a month later, following his arrest in connection with the Qatar corruption scandal at the European Parliament. He was dismissed on 11 March 2023 for having accepted funds from Antonio Panzeri.

== Arrest ==
In December 2022, just days after being elected as General Secretary of ITUC, Visentini was arrested as part of the Qatar corruption scandal at the European Parliament in which Qatar had allegedly paid large sums of cash for influence at the European Parliament. After two days in custody, Visentini was conditionally released.

== Other activities ==
Visentini is a poet and writer, publishing four books of poetry and novels between 2004 and 2012. He has headed cultural associations and networks in the fields of literature and theatre.

== See also ==
- Qatar corruption scandal at the European Parliament

== Bibliography ==
- Traduzioni perdute, Ibiskos, 2004
- Corridoio 5, Racconti dal caffè di mezza Europa, Danilo Zanetti Editore, 2004
- Goffi erotismi pagani, Ibiskos, 2007
- Prima della rivoluzione, Lietocolle, 2012

Trade union offices
Preceded by Bernadette Ségol	General Secretary of the European Trade Union Confederation; 2015–2022	Succeeded by Esther Lynch
