= Unió Sindical d'Andorra =

Trade Union of Andorra

- Founded: 2001
- Headquarters: Andorra la Vella
- Location: European Union
- Members: 19 affiliated unions
- Affiliations: European Trade Union Confederation
- Website: sindicat-usda.com

Unió Sindical d'Andorra ('Trade Union of Andorra', abbreviated USdA) is a national trade union centre in Andorra. As of 2013 Gabriel Ubach i Valdivia was the general secretary of USdA. As of 2014 Maria José Espinosa served as first secretary of USdA.

== History ==
As of 2005 USdA claimed to have 19 affiliated unions. The majority (11) were organizing public sector employees. USdA claimed that it had 3,487 individual members at the time. As of 2014 it was estimated that USdA had around 700 members, some 60% in public sector and the remaining 40% in the private sector. Apart from USdA, another trade union organization in the country is the Sindicat Andorrà dels Treballadors ('Andorran Workers Trade Union', SAT). Both USdA and SAT demands a reform of the Andorran Trade Union Law. According to Ubach i Valdivia the lack of labour rights in Andorra is akin to the situation in a 'dictatorship'. As of 2005 USdA claimed that some 700 of its members in the private sector did not dare to have their names listed as union members, due to fear from reprisals from employers. In a 2006 interview an USdA representative claimed that the Andorran government did not respect European treaties in regards of the rights of workers from neighbouring countries. Moreover, she claimed that 90% of labour contracts in Andorra were 'verbal' and that the legal status of trade unions in the country remained unclear.

== International relations ==
The organization is affiliated to the European Trade Union Confederation (ETUC). USdA is a member of CSI Pirimed (Pirimed Inter-Trade Union Council), a body of French and Catalan trade unions. CSI Pirimed supports the efforts of USdA for labour rights in Andorra.
