= Unión Sindical de Trabajadores de Guatemala =

UNSITRAGUA
- Unión Sindical de Trabajadores de Guatemala
- Headquarters: Guatemala City
- Location: Guatemala
- Affiliations: Confederación Sindical Internacional -CSI- Confederación Sindical de las Américas -CSA-
- Website: http://www.unsitraguahistorica.org

The Unión Sindical de Trabajadores de Guatemala (UNSITRAGUA) is a national trade union center in Guatemala. UNSITRAGUA - is an umbrella organization with nationwide presence that integrates unions of workers of the branches of Industry, Services, Agricultural, self-employment and Independents.
