= Bernadette Ségol =

French former trade union leader (born 1949)

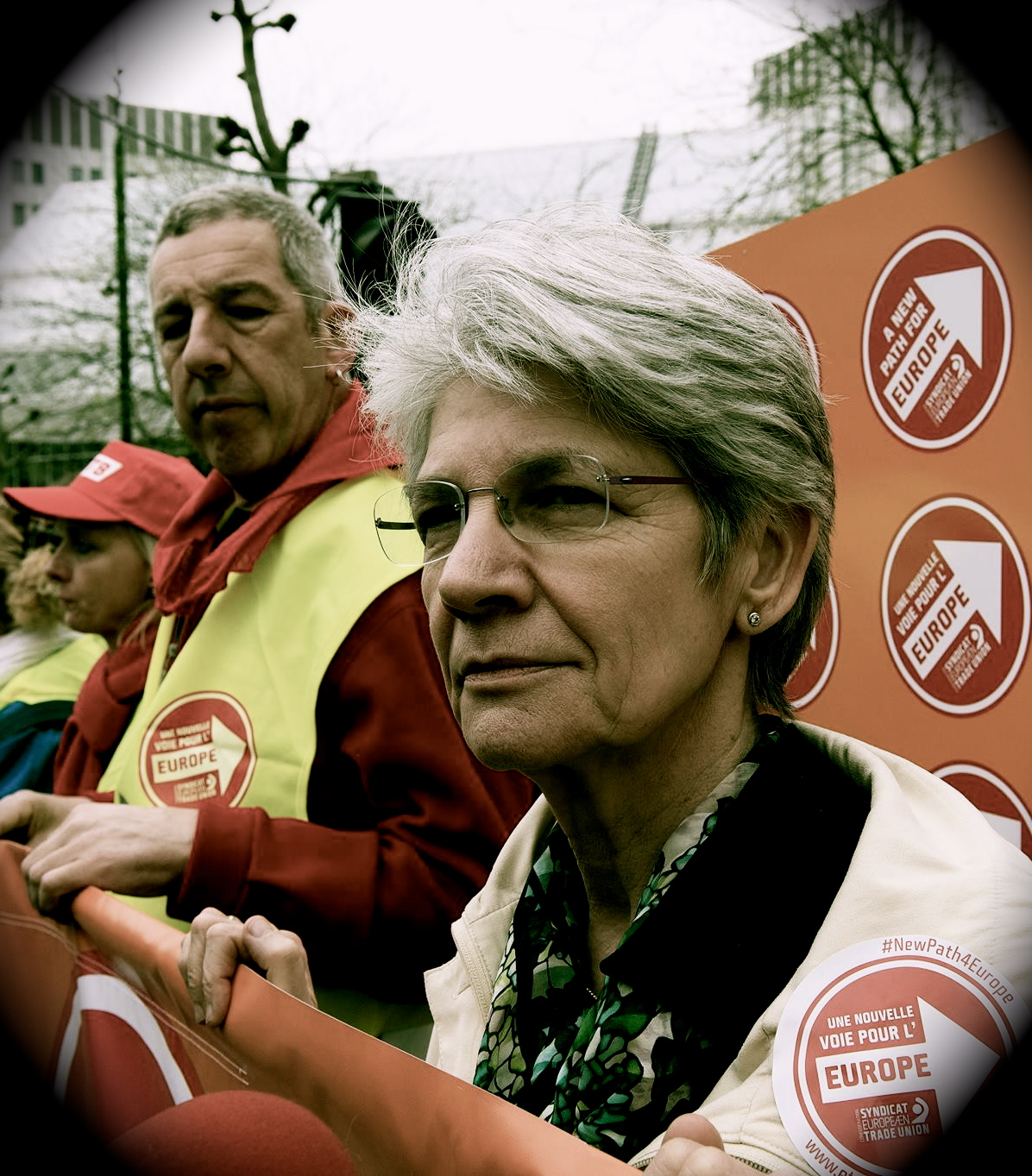
Ségol in 2014

Bernadette Ségol (born 1949) is a French former trade union leader.

Born in Luzech, Ségol received a master's degree in philosophy from the University of Toulouse, then became the assistant to the general secretary of the International Textile, Garment and Leather Workers' Federation. In 1985, she moved to Brussels to become director of Euro-FIET, the European section of the International Federation of Commercial, Clerical, Professional and Technical Employees. In 2000, this merged into the new UNI-Europa, the European section of the Union Network International (UNI), and Ségol was elected as its first general secretary. Under her leadership, UNI-Europa set up European Works Councils, campaigned for the Temporary Agency Workers' Directive, and worked to ensure that the Services Directive maintained workers' rights.

In 2011, Ségol was elected as general secretary of the European Trade Union Confederation, the first woman to hold the post. She focused on campaigning against austerity. She retired in 2015.

Trade union offices
Preceded by Heribert Maier	Regional Secretary of Euro-FIET; 1985–2000	Succeeded by Union merged
Preceded by New position	General Secretary of UNI-Europa; 2000–2010	Succeeded by Oliver Roethig
Preceded by John Monks	General Secretary of the European Trade Union Confederation; 2011–2015	Succeeded by Luca Visentini
