= Independent Trade Unions of Croatia =

NHS
- Independent Trade Unions of Croatia
- Nezavisni Hrvatski Sindikati
- Founded: 1992
- Headquarters: Zagreb, Croatia
- Location: Croatia
- Members: 113,589 (34 unions)
- Key people: Krešimir Sever, president
- Affiliations: International Trade Union Confederation
- Website: www.nhs.hr

The Independent Trade Unions of Croatia (NHS) is a trade union centre in Croatia.
