= European Arts and Entertainment Alliance =

European trade union federation

The European Arts and Entertainment Alliance (EAEA) is a European industry federation of trade unions representing workers in the live performance and audiovisual industries.

The federation was established in 1999, on the initiative of the European Regional Organisation – Media and Entertainment International (EURO-MEI), the International Federation of Actors (FIA) and the International Federation of Musicians (FIM). This ran in parallel to the formation of the International Arts and Entertainment Alliance.

Shortly after its foundation, the federation worked with PEARLE* to establish a live performance European Sectoral Social Dialogue Committee. By 2002, the federation represented a total of 300,000 members, and by 2021 it represented 75 unions through their affiliation with EURO-MEI, the FIA or the FIM.
