= Estonian Association of Journalists =

Organization based in Estonia

Estonian Association of Journalists (Estonian: Eesti Ajakirjanike Liit, abbreviated EAL) is an Estonian association which unites professional journalist and media workers in Estonia. EAL aims "to uphold, develop and value Estonian journalistic culture and advance the creative possibilities of its members".

EAL is full member in International Federation of Journalists and European Federation of Journalists. EAL is also member in Estonian Cultural Chamber (Estonian: Eesti Kultuuri Koda) and Confederation of Estonian Trade Unions.

EAL is established in 1919.
