= Egyptian Democratic Labour Congress =

EDLC
- Egyptian Democratic Labour Congress
- Headquarters: Cairo, Egypt

The Egyptian Democratic Labour Congress (EDLC) is an independent national trade union centre formed in 2013. Following the Egyptian Revolution of 2011 large numbers of independent trade unions emerged. While the first independent unions in the public sector joined the Egyptian Federation of Independent Trade Unions (EFITU), the EDLC grouped together mostly private sector trade unions. The EDLC has its origins in the work of Kamal Abbas of the Centre for Trade Union and Workers' Services (CTUWS), a non-government organization which supported workers during the Mubarak regime, when independent unions were banned.
