= United Branch Trade Unions "Independence" =

The United Branch Trade Unions "Independence" (Serbian: Ujedinjeni Gradjanski Sindikati "Nezavisnost", UGS) is a trade union federation in Serbia.

The federation was established in 1991, by a group of trade unions which had been founded after the fall of communism in Yugoslavia. The oldest included the Metal Workers' Union, the Independent Media Union, and the Teachers' Union.

The federation was opposed to Slobodan Milosevic, and was persecuted under his presidency. It led major strike in 1998, then moved towards political action. It formed part of the opposition Yugoslav Action Group, with various other civic groups. When Milosevic initially refused to accept defeat in the 2000 Yugoslavian general election, it backed strikes which played a part in forcing him out.

By 2005, the federation claimed a total of 180,000 members.
