= Central Autónoma de Trabajadores =

CAT
- Central Autónoma de Trabajadores
- Founded: 1995
- Headquarters: Santiago, Chile
- Location: Chile
- Key people: Osvaldo Herbach Alvarez, president Pedro Robles, secretary general
- Affiliations: ITUC

The Central Autónoma de Trabajadores (CAT) is a trade union centre in Chile.

The CAT is affiliated with the International Trade Union Confederation.
