= Maire MacDonagh =

Irish trade union official (1918–1997)

- Born: 20 March 1918; Kilconnell, County Galway
- Died: 3 June 1997 (aged 79); Letterkenny, County Donegal
- Occupation: trade unionist

Maire MacDonagh (20 March 1918 – 3 June 1997) was an Irish trade union official, who served as general secretary of the Association of Secondary Teachers, Ireland for 25 years.

== Early life and education ==
Maire MacDonagh was born in Kilconnell, County Galway on 20 March 1918. She was the second of three surviving daughters of Michael MacDonagh, customs official, and Caroline (née Keary). She attended primary school locally, before going to Taylor's Hill Convent, Galway, and Sion Hill Convent, Blackrock, Dublin. In 1936 she entered University College Galway (UCG), graduating in 1939 with a first class BA in French and Irish and a B.Comm. In 1941 she received a first class MA in Old Irish and a higher diploma in education, again from UCG. She worked for a time for an insurance company in Dublin, and then taught at Sion Hill Convent, Blackrock for a few years. She then worked as private secretary to the managing director Cahill's, a Dublin printing firm, J. J. O'Leary.

== Career ==
MacDonagh joined the staff of the Irish Trades Union Congress (ICTU) in 1953, working with union leaders such as Donal Nevin, Shirley Lowe, and Ruaidhri Roberts. She was Nevin's secretary while he was the general secretary of the congress. From 1956 to 1958 she was secretary to the unity committee, serving as rapporteur during the talks which saw the establishment of the unified trades union congress in 1958. She was unanimously chosen out of 91 candidates who applied for the job of general secretary of the Association of Secondary School Teachers in Ireland (ASTI), taking up the position in June 1959. The Ryan Tribunal recommended a standardised salary that would be paid by the state for all teachers in 1969. The ASTI opposed this as secondary school teachers had a slightly higher salary scale than primary or vocational teachers. The members also voted to become affiliated with ICTU. It was under MacDonagh's leadership that a strike was called in February 1969. The strike would close 570 schools, affecting around 135,000 students and almost 5,000 teachers. After three weeks the dispute was called off, with the matter ultimately settled in 1971. In 1973 she was elected to the executive committee of the International Federation of Secondary School Teachers (FIPESCO).

From 1972 the ASTI reorganised, seeing MacDonagh take on a more prominent role in direct negotiations and on ASTI representative deputations. The membership of the union rose, from 1,000 members in 1958, which had risen to 10,500 by March 1983. MacDonagh retired after 25 years as general secretary of ASTI on 31 March 1983. The celebration to mark the occasion, a gala dinner, was attended by many high-profile representatives from across teaching organisations as well as former teacher and education minister John Wilson, the minister for education Gemma Hussey, and former teacher, minister for education, and European commissioner Richard Burke. She was awarded an honorary fellowship by the Educational Institute of Scotland in 1982.

She died after a short illness on 3 June 1997, at the home of her sister in Letterkenny, County Donegal.
