= Bonaire Federation of Labour =

FEDEBON
- Bonaire Federation of Labour
- Federación Boneriana di Trabao
- Headquarters: Kralendijk, Bonaire
- Location: Netherlands Antilles
- Key people: Gerald Teodulo Bernabella, president Nereida Lucrecia Ramales, secretary general
- Affiliations: ITUC

The Bonaire Federation of Labour (FEDEBON) is a trade union federation on the island of Bonaire in the Netherlands Antilles. It is affiliated with the International Trade Union Confederation.
