= Estonian Employees' Unions' Confederation =

Organization based in Estonia

TALO
- Estonian Employees' Unions' Confederation
- Teenistujate Ametiliitude Keskorganisatsioon
- Founded: September 28, 1992
- Headquarters: Tallinn, Estonia
- Location: Estonia
- Members: 37,000
- Key people: Toivo Roosimaa
- Affiliations: ETUC
- Website: www.talo.ee

Estonian Employees' Unions' Confederation (Estonian: Teenistujate Ametiliitude Keskorganisatsioon, TALO) is a trade union in Estonia. It is affiliated with the European Trade Union Confederation.

== See also ==
- Confederation of Estonian Trade Unions
