= Manual Trade Workers Union =

The Manual Trade Workers Union (Niqabat 'Ummal al-Sana'i' al-Yadawiyya) was a union created in 1909 to further the interests of Egyptian trade laborers and craftsmen and protect them from the growing influence of foreign imperialists on the employment sphere in Egypt.

== Origins ==
The Manual Trade Workers Union was founded under the leadership and umbrella of the Egyptian Nationalist Party in 1908. This was done for the purposes of establishing a national base of support for the party as it was previously composed mainly of upper class intellectuals. The word Niqaba distinguishes the organization as a union. The term doesn't translate to either league or association, two words that had been in the lexicon at the time, but rather it refers to a guild. In this manner the union is invoking legitimacy by association by naming itself after something in the past.

== Composition ==
Initially the MTWU did not comprise itself of a general worker class but rather was focused on attracting more craft based workers such as artisans or small scale proprietors and employers. One significant well from which the MTWU drew from were disgruntled employees of Egyptian State Railways. Egyptian State Railways was a corporation owned by the Belgians and comprised itself of a number of smaller transportation firms but most notably the Cairo Tramway Company. The workers of the ESR took on roles such as "Metal Workers, Mechanics, and Stokers" and as such fell under the auspices of the MTWU's distinction of craft workers. These railway workers would later stage riots in 1910 and go on a violent strike. The Union also included honorary members who were not necessarily workers themselves but provided funds to support the cause.

== Goals ==
As a union the MTWU was trying to advance the state of their constituent members but given the unique situation of British imperialism in Egypt at the beginnings of the 20th century, they tended to connect advances in workers' rights to the protest against foreign forces. This attitude can be gleaned from this quote from a speech delivered by Muhammed Farid during a 1910 assembly of the Union,

"I attended one of these sessions with some of my colleagues and heard two of the members speak; they were both shoemakers, and their address concerned the need to protect industry from the competition of foreigners"

From a laborers perspective these ideas of advancing up through the ranks in a predominately European hierarchy made the connections between improvement of labor conditions to the removal of foreigners from the nation. All of these alignments of ideas contributed to the MTWU's connection to the Nationalist Movement. Beyond just the workplace, when striking against the tramway system the police brought in to dispel the workers were British, further contributing to their distaste for foreign influence. The needs of the workers were in line with the desires of the Nationalist Party.

=== Nationalist Party ===
In a general strike in 1911 supported by the Nationalist Party, Al-Liwa had this to say

"Your cause is the cause not only of the tramway workers, but of all the workers in Egypt. Your strike coming after that of the workers is proof that a new power has emerged in Egypt that cannot be ignored..."

The Nationalist Party saw the MTWU as a means to achieve their goals by co-opting them as a support base, something that still worked out well for the workers themselves.

"Egyptian Workers had been petitioning and striking and organizing for years, without the nationalist having paid much explicit or positive attention; but now these actions acquired new meanings and were quite quickly reinscribed in the discourse of Egyptian Nationalism"

Though the Wafd would arise from the same intellectual circles as the Nationalist Party there is no direct connection between them and the Union.

== Related, Worker's Role in 1919 Revolution ==
Leading up the 1919 revolution the Union would reemerge in the city of Alexandria urging the workers to unite under a single laborers banner rather than be scattered among a variety of more specific interest groups.

=== Cairo Tram Workers ===
The workers of the Cairo Tramway Company would seize the 1919 revolution as a time to act and strike against their foreign employers. Leading up to the revolution there was an overall decrease in the number of workers employed and an increase in the amount of service the tram was providing, leading to an increase in the amount of work per employee. Seeing the anti-British revolution as a means to strike out they incapacitated a large number of tram cars by toppling them and rendering them unusable. The strike continued from March into April 1919 all without leadership or guidance from the MTWU.
