= Confédération Syndicale des Travailleurs du Congo =

Trade union center in Republic of the Congo

CSTC
- Confédération Syndicale des Travailleurs du Congo
- Headquarters: Brazzaville, Republic of the Congo
- Location: Republic of the Congo
- Key people: Michel Souza, president
- Affiliations: ITUC

The Confédération Syndicale des Travailleurs du Congo (CSTC) is a trade union centre in Republic of the Congo.

It a 2005 report the ICFTU stated:

in the Republic of Congo, the government continued its interference in the affairs of the CSTC, by favouring those sections of the union movement which it believed were most loyal to it.

The CSC is affiliated with the International Trade Union Confederation.
