= National Confederation of Free Trade Unions of Romania – Brotherhood =

CNSLR-Frăţia
- National Confederation of Free Trade Unions of Romania - Brotherhood
- Confederaţia Naţională a Sindicatelor Libere din România-Frăţia
- Founded: 1993
- Headquarters: Bucharest, Romania
- Location: Romania
- Members: 800,000
- Key people: Marius Petcu, president Sorin Stan, secretary general
- Affiliations: ITUC, ETUC
- Website: cnslr-fratia.ro

The National Confederation of Free Trade Unions of Romania – Brotherhood (Romanian: Confederaţia Naţională a Sindicatelor Libere din România-Frăţia or CNSLR-Frăţia) is the largest national trade union center in Romania. It was created from the 1993 merger of the National Confederation of Free Trade Unions of Romania (CNSLR) and Frăţia.

The CNSLR is the reformed organization of previous communist era unions. Membership has declined to its current level of 800,000, but it is still by far the largest of the trade union centers in the country.

CNSLR-Frăţia is affiliated with the International Trade Union Confederation, and the European Trade Union Confederation.
