= UNI Europa =

UNI Europa is a European industry federation of unions in various related industries.

The UNI Global Union was founded on 1 January 2000, bringing together several global union federations. At the same time, the equivalent European federations also merged. These were:

- European Committee of the Communications International (founded 1965)
- European Graphical Federation (founded 1985)
- European Regional Organisation of the Media and Entertainment International (founded 1973)
- International Federation of Commercial, Clerical, Professional and Technical Employees – European Regional Organisation (founded 1972)

By 2002, the federation had 282 affiliates in 33 countries, representing a total of 6 million members. In contrast to other European industry federations, UNI Europa shares a secretariat with the UNI Global Union, and was initially led by a director rather than a general secretary. It holds a conference every five years which is its highest decision-making body.

== Leadership ==
=== Regional Secretaries ===
2000: Bernadette Ségol
2011: Oliver Roethig

=== Presidents ===
2000: Roland Issen
2002: Frank Bsirske
2021: Peter Hellberg
