= Basic Necessities Survey =

Poverty measurement

The Basic Necessities Survey (BNS) is a participatory and rights-oriented approach to the measurement of poverty. It has been most widely used by non-government organisations working with local communities on nature conservation issues in developing economies. It is a specific type of multidimensional measure of poverty, with its origins in research on "consensual" definitions of poverty.

== Definition and construction ==
As first described in 1998: A focus group is used to generate a menu of items and activities that people may think are "basic necessities". Such a list should include items whose likely status as necessities is unclear, as well as those seen as more likely to be seen as necessities

A representative sample of households in a community is then surveyed, asking two types of questions:

1. "Which of the items on this list do you think are basic necessities which everyone should have and which no one should have to do without?"

2. "Which of these items does your household have now?"

For each item, the percentage of respondents who believe the item to be a basic necessity is calculated. Only items which more than 50% of respondents consider to be basic necessities are recognised as such. The percentage of respondents who consider each item to be a "basic necessity" is then treated as the weighting for that item. A poverty score is then calculated for each respondent by adding together the weighting for all the basic necessity items which the respondent actually possesses, divided by the total of the weightings for all the "basic necessity" items (i.e., the total possible score). If the respondent has all the `basic necessities', their score will be 100%, if they have none of the `basic necessities', their score will be 0%.

== Origins ==
The 1998 design of the BNS built on earlier work on the "consensual definition of poverty" by Mack and Lansley in the UK and Hallerod in Sweden. Mack and Lansley defined items as necessities if, as above, more than 50% of respondents identified them as such, Results were summarised in terms of percentages of the respondents lacking 1, 2, 3 to N number of necessities. They defined poverty as the lack of three or more such items, after identifying this cut-off point by using ".. a range of sequential statistical procedures...". In contrast, Hallerod rejected the 50% cut off because it was literally not a measure of consensus. And more contestably, Hallerod argued that 50% was an "arbitrary" cut-off point. His alternative approach, called the "Proportional Deprivation Index" generated a score which was the sum of the weightings of all the items a respondent possessed, treated as a percentage of the maximum possible score (the sum of all weightings). These calculations included weightings of less than 50%.

The design of the BNS combined the aggregation of weightings used by Hallerod, but only applied this to items rated as necessities by more than 50% of respondents, the distinction used by Mack and Lansley. The 50% cut-off was described and justified as a democratic (but not consensual) because of its widespread use in electoral systems. The BNS is described as rights-oriented, because of how necessities are defined, being items and activities "which everyone should have and which no one should have to do without". There are no additional questions about whether a reported lack is chosen or not, as was the case the Mack and Lansley study.

== Use ==
The BNS was first used in 1997 by ActionAid in Vietnam, as part of a baseline survey of poverty of households in four communes of Can Loc district of Ha Tinh province, at the beginning of the Ha Tinh Integrated Poverty Alleviation Programme (HTPAP). The same survey design was repeated in 2006, two years after the end of the programme . Changes in the distribution of poverty (BNS) scores between 1997 and 2006 can be seen in the first scatterplot (Figure 1).

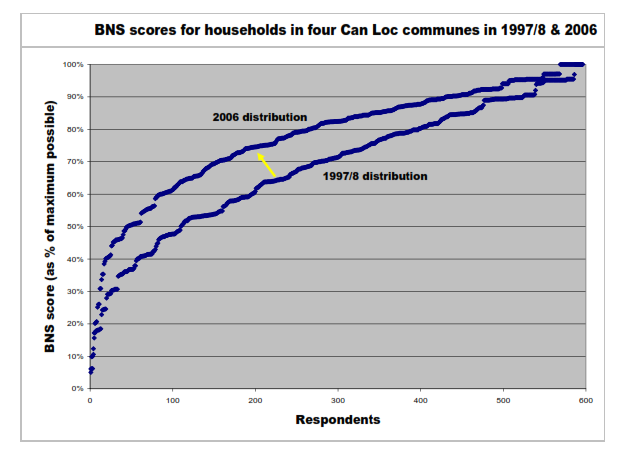
Figure 1: BNS scores from the 1997 and 2006 Basic Necessities Surveys in Can Loc District, Ha Tinh province, Vietnam

In 2007 the BNS methodology was publicised in two joint USAID / Wildlife Conservation Societypublications, on the use of household and livelihood surveys. Since then, the BNS has been used in Uganda, Brazil, Cambodia, China, Democratic Republic of Congo, Kenya, Nigeria, Madagascar, Malawi Mali and Rwanda. This diffusion was aided by USAID's publication in 2015 of "A Guide To The Modified Basic Necessities Survey: Why And How To Conduct BNS In Conservation Landscapes", based on WCS and others experiences in these countries . The purpose was "to bring to conservation practitioners a low-cost tool for credibly assessing how conservation actions affect families' livelihoods and sense of well-being and tracking changes within and across villages over time" . An updated version of the Guide was subsequently published in 2020.

An updated bibliography of publications about the use the BNS, and some related methods, is maintained online.

== Adaptations ==
The 2015 WCS modification of the BNS included additional questions aimed at quantifying the assets identified as basic necessities and possessed by respondents, then the calculation of a household wealth index based on that data and local price information. The "Wealth Index" made it possible to differentiate amongst the non-poor families, i.e., those that scored 100% on the BNS. The BNS scoring process, described above, was retained in its original form.

The 2006 survey in Vietnam included an additional question: "Compared to other households in this commune, do you think your household is poor, or not poor?" Overall, there was a 0.95 inverse correlation between the BNS score and the proportion of respondents who said they were poor. In other words, most poorer households reported themselves as poor and most less poor households reported themselves as not poor. In total, 35% reported themselves as "poor". Assuming that errors in self-reporting are equal in both directions (non-poor reporting as poor, poor reporting as non-poor) this aggregated response provided a "head count" measure of poverty, which complemented the "depth of poverty" description of the BNS score distribution. It also provided a means of identifying an observable cut-off point in the range of BNS score, which defines a poverty line: 35% of respondents were found below the BNS score of 75%, which now defines the poverty line in BNS score terms. Other assumptions about the distribution of self-reporting errors generate other cut-off points.

== Comparisons with other methods ==
Many poverty measurement methods have been designed to be used on a national scale e.g., studies in South Africa. In contrast, the BNS was designed with the intention of being sensitive to local contexts. Almost all the uses by the WCS have been with small communities, often isolated or with specific ethnicities or sources of livelihoods. However, there is no intrinsic reason why the BNS could not be used on a national scale, in the same ways as the surveys by Mack and Lansey, and Hallerod. The main challenge in using the BNS in different locations, on different scales, and in different time periods, is to ensure a statistically useable degree of comparability of the contents of the menu of items used in the surveys.

The BNS, and related consensual methods, separate out description questions (Which of these do you have?) from evaluative questions (Which of these do you think are basic necessities?). This makes it possible to track changes over time in expectations as well as changes in actual poverty, over time and locations. The poverty status of households may change as a result of changes in their possession, changes expectations of possession or changes in both.

The distinction between expectations and possession also has practical relevance, for those planning development aid interventions or commercial marketing activities. Some items will display a bigger gap between expectation and possession, than others.

== Criticisms ==
Criticism commonly made of other versions of "consensual" approaches to poverty measurement can also be applied to the BNS. One is that views of what are basic necessities are likely to depend on age, gender, and other household characteristics. However, findings by Mack and Lansley in the UK, Wright in South Africa, and Nandy and Pomati in Benin and others have found that within at least those countries views do not vary substantially across gender, class and ethnicity categories. The same was the case with respondents' gender differences in the 2006 BNS survey in Vietnam. There was a 0.99 correlation between judgements of item necessities by the male (37%) and female respondents (63%). The details of their score distributions can be seen in Figure 2. Wider gender differences might be expected with items which are not seen as necessities but may be seen as desirable.

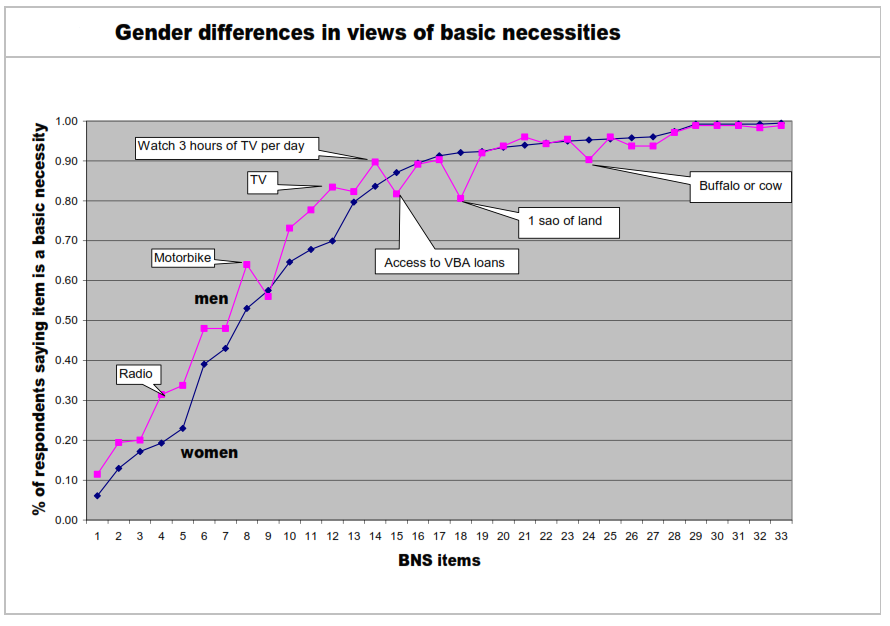
Figure 2:Gender differences in BNS scores in the 2006 Basic Necessities Survey, Can Loc district, Ha Tinh district, Vietnam

Another potential weakness is that poorer households might be adjusting their expectations downwards, knowing that some items are way beyond their reach, and so not rating some items as basic necessities, though others might. However, there is strong evidence against this in a 2015 Benin BNS study and little evidence of this in the wider research on consensual methods. The risk seems likely to be higher in national rather than local scale uses because there the menu of items surveyed is likely to need to include a wider range of items, defined in terms of their affordability. This hypothesis has yet to be tested.

== Future uses ==
The identification of poor households via household surveys costs time and money. However, World Bank researchers have argued that machine learning methods have the potential to analyse household survey data sets and identify small combinations of features which are good predictors of a household's poverty status . This potential has been confirmed by a re-analysis of the 2006 Vietnam data, using a Decision Tree algorithm, within the Rapid Miner Studio package. This found that the poverty status of 85% of households could be correctly identified using seven of the 33 items in the survey menu. Seventy five percent were identifiable using only three items. All but one of the seven items were quickly observable.
