= Bangladesh Sanjukta Sramik Federation =

Trade Union Federation in Bangladesh

BSSF
- Bangladesh Sanjukta Sramik Federation
- Headquarters: 54/B BK Tower Purana Paltan Dhaka
- Location: Bangladesh
- Members: 21,272 (2003)
- Key people: Tofazzal Hossain Bagu (President); Md Jahangir Alam Chowdhury (General Secretary)
- Affiliations: International Trade Union Confederation (ITUC); International Labour Confederation (ILC); South Asian Regional Trade Union Confederation (Sartuk)

The Bangladesh Sanjukta Sramik Federation is a national trade union federation in Bangladesh. It is affiliated with the International Trade Union Confederation (ITUC).
