= Esther Lynch =

Irish trade unionist (born 1963)

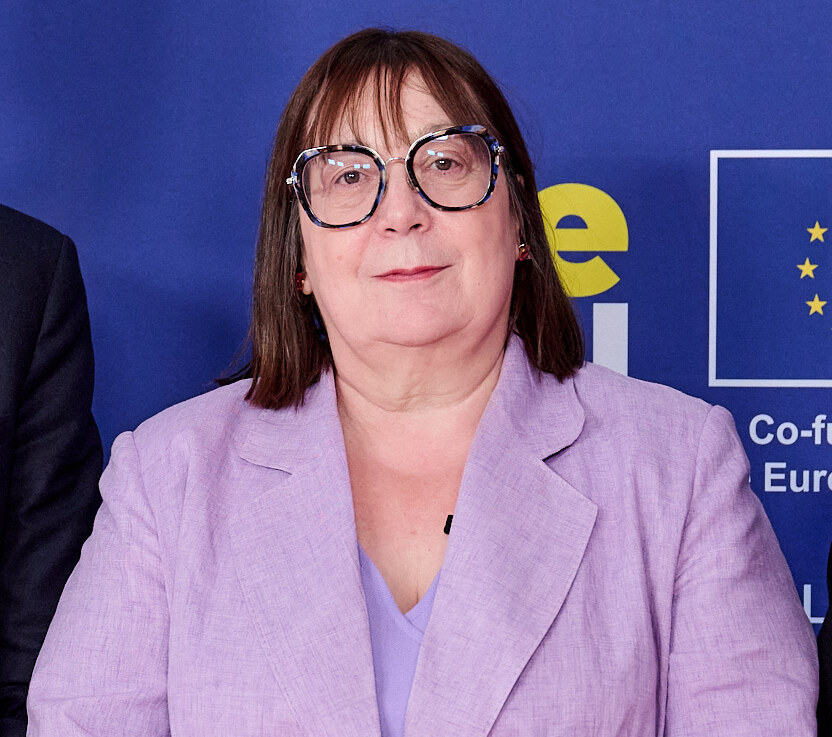
- Esther Lynch in 2024
- Born: 1963 (age 62–63)
- Employer: European Trade Union Confederation

Esther Lynch (born 1963) is an Irish trade unionist. She is General Secretary of the European Trade Union Confederation (ETUC). Lynch was elected as General Secretary of the ETUC in 2022, the first Irish person and second woman to hold the post. As leader of the confederation, she is prioritising fighting for fair pay, equal pay for women, employment security, and workers' rights. Prior to that, Lynch held the position of Confederal Secretary of the ETUC from 2015, and in 2019, she was elected as its Deputy General Secretary.

In the 1980s, Lynch worked in a factory making microchips, where she first joined a union. She then moved to become a political advisor to Joan Burton, the Minister for Social Affairs. In 1993, she moved to work for the Irish Congress of Trade Unions, where her role included negotiations on pay and social partnership agreements.

Trade union offices
Preceded by Luca Visentini	General Secretary of the European Trade Union Confederation; 2022–present	Succeeded by Incumbent
