= Egyptian Federation of Independent Trade Unions =

EFITU
- Egyptian Federation of Independent Trade Unions
- Al-Ittihad al-Masri lil-Naqabat al-Mustaqilla
- Founded: 2011
- Headquarters: Egypt
- Location: Egypt
- Affiliations: ITUC

The Egyptian Federation of Independent Trade Unions (EFITU, also referred to as the Egyptian Independent Trade Union Federation) was the first independent national trade union center to be founded following the 2011 Egyptian Revolution. Previously, independent trade unionism was illegal and almost all trade unions were under government control.

== Formation ==
For the years leading up to the Revolution, workers had been engaged in strikes and actions against the Mubarak regime. These actions eventually coalesced into the Revolution itself and formed the movement behind the establishment of the Federation. On 30 January 2011, as part of the 2011 Egyptian protests, a meeting convened in Tahrir square led to the formation of the Federation of Egyptian Trade Unions in response to the effective state control of the Egyptian Trade Union Federation.

The founding declaration of the Constitutional Body was issued in the name of the following organisations, as well as various workers' independent groups in industries

- RETA
- Retired Workers' Union
- Health Professionals Union
- Teachers' Independent Union

== Demands ==
The first acts of the new federation were to call for a general strike in support of the opposition movement's demands for change, and to publish a list of demands for wage reform, welfare reform, workers rights and the release of opposition detainees. These demands received support from a number of Labour organisations internationally, including the International Trade Union Confederation and the British Trades Union Congress Touchstone Blogger, Owen Tudor. In July 2011, the federation called for Boycott, Divestment and Sanctions (BDS) against Israel and the expulsion of Histadrut from the ITUC, which won the backing of the Congress of South African Trade Unions (COSATU).
