= Union of San Marino Workers =

Worker's Union in San Marino

The Union of San Marino Workers (Italian: Unione Sammarinese Lavoratori, USL) is a general union in San Marino.

The union was established in 2008. It is a unitary organisation, with three sectors: public employment, services and commerce, and industry and crafts. It chose not to affiliate to any national federation, but in 2019, it did affiliate to the European Trade Union Confederation.
