= Association of Free Trade Unions of Slovenia =

- Association of Free Trade Unions of Slovenia
- Zveza svobodnih sindikatov Slovenije
- Abbreviation: ZSSS
- Headquarters: Ljubljana, Slovenia
- Location: Slovenia
- Members: 300,000
- Key people: Dušan Semolič, president; Milan Utroša, general secretary
- Affiliations: ETUC
- Website: www.sindikat-zsss.si

The Association of Free Trade Unions of Slovenia (Slovene: Zveza svobodnih sindikatov Slovenije; ZSSS) is the largest national trade union center in Slovenia, with a membership of 300,000. It was formed from the remains of the old Yugoslav-era unions.

The ZSSS has control of all four of the trade union seats in the National Council of Slovenia, and is affiliated with the European Trade Union Confederation.
