= San Marino Confederation of Labour =

CSdL
- San Marino Confederation of Labour
- Confederazione Sammarinese del Lavoro
- Founded: 1943
- Headquarters: Domagnano, San Marino
- Location: San Marino
- Members: 2400
- Key people: Giovanni Ghiotti, Secretary General
- Affiliations: ITUC, ETUC
- Website: www.csdl.sm

The San Marino Confederation of Labour (Italian: Confederazione Sammarinese del Lavoro, CSdL) is a national trade union center in San Marino. It was founded in 1943 and has a membership of 2400.

The CSdL is affiliated with the International Trade Union Confederation, and the European Trade Union Confederation.
