= Union of Autonomous Trade Unions of Croatia =

SSSH
- Union of Autonomous Trade Unions of Croatia
- Savez samostalnih sindikata Hrvatske
- Founded: May 1990
- Headquarters: Zagreb, Croatia
- Location: Croatia
- Members: around 135 000 (27 unions)
- Key people: Mladen Novosel, president
- Affiliations: ITUC, ETUC
- Website: www.sssh.hr

The Union of Autonomous Trade Unions of Croatia (Savez samostalnih sindikata Hrvatske, SSSH) is recognized as the principal voice of Croatian trade unionism. It was founded in May 1990, and represents around 1/5 of organized workers in the country. It has 18 affiliated industrial unions.

The SSSH is affiliated to the European Trade Union Confederation and the International Trade Union Confederation.
