= General Alliance of Labour Unions in Suriname =

AVVS
- General Alliance of Labour Unions in Suriname
- Algemeen Verbond van Vakverenigingen in Suriname 'De Moederbond'
- Founded: 1951
- Headquarters: Paramaribo, Suriname
- Location: Suriname
- Affiliations: ITUC

The General Alliance of Labour Unions in Suriname (AVVS, or De Moederbond) is a trade union federation in Suriname. It was founded in 1951.

In 1982 Cyrill Daal, the president of De Moederbond, was executed by the military.

In 1986 the International Confederation of Free Trade Unions (ICFTU) suspended De Moederbond's membership because of a lack of democratic principles within the union. Membership in ICFTU (now the ITUC) was restored two years later in response to restorative changes.
