= International Trade Union Confederation =

Global trade union federation

- Abbreviation: ITUC
- Formation: 1 November 2006; 19 years ago
- Merger of: International Confederation of Free Trade Unions; World Confederation of Labour
- Type: Trade union federation
- Headquarters: Brussels, Belgium
- Members: 207 million (2018)
- President: Akiko Gono
- General secretary: Luc Triangle
- Website: ituc-csi.org

The International Trade Union Confederation (ITUC; French: Confédération syndicale international, CSI; German: Internationaler Gewerkschaftsbund, IGB; Spanish: Confederación Sindical Internacional, CSI) is the world's largest trade union federation.

== History ==
=== Background ===
The ITUC traces its origins back to the First International (also known as the International Workingmen's Association) and in 2014 commemorated the 150th anniversary of the founding of the International Working Men's Association at its own world congress held in Berlin.

=== Founding congress ===
The federation was formed on 1 November 2006 out of the merger of the International Confederation of Free Trade Unions (ICFTU) and the World Confederation of Labour (WCL). The Founding Congress of the ITUC was held in Vienna and was preceded by the dissolution congresses of both the ICFTU and the WCL. A council of Global Unions was also formed on the final day of the congress. It was established jointly with ten global union federations and the Trade Union Advisory Committee to the OECD (TUAC).

=== Global Rights Index ===
In 2014, the ITUC debuted the Global Rights Index, which ranks nations on 97 metrics pertaining to workers' rights, such as freedom from violent conditions and the right to strike and unionize. According to the 2020 update of the Index, there has been a significant increase in violations of workers' rights around the world.

=== Qatari corruption scandal ===
In 2022, Luca Visentini, the IUTC's General Secretary, was arrested as part of the Qatar corruption scandal at the European Parliament, which allegedly involved the state of Qatar paying large sums of cash for influence at the European Parliament. After two days in custody, he was conditionally released. It was revealed that Visenti's successful campaign to lead the IUTC was financed in part by a nonprofit run by Antonio Panzeri, a former lawmaker that has admitted working as an agent of Qatar. Visentini also received a free flight to Qatar, paid for by the Qatari government.

== Organisation ==
Countries in light blue have an ITUC affiliate

The ITUC has three main regional organizations: the Asia-Pacific Regional Organization, the Trade Union Confederation of the Americas, and the African Regional Organisation. The Trade Union Development Cooperation Network (TUDCN) is an initiative of the ITUC whose main objective is to bring the trade union perspective into international development policy debates and improve the coordination and effectiveness of trade union development cooperation activities.

The ITUC represents 207 million workers through its 331 affiliated organizations within 163 countries and territories. Luc Triangle is the current acting General Secretary.

The Pan-European Regional Council (PERC), a European trade union organisation within the ITUC was formed 19 March 2007. It consists of 87 national trade union centres and a total membership of 87 million. It works closely with the European Trade Union Confederation (ETUC). The ITUC raises capital through charging dues to its member organisations.

== Leadership ==
=== General Secretaries ===
2006: Guy Ryder
2010: Sharan Burrow
2022: Luca Visentini
2023: Luc Triangle

=== Presidents ===
2006: Sharan Burrow
2010: Michael Sommer
2014: João Antonio Felicio
2018: Ayuba Wabba
2022: Akiko Gono

== Affiliated Organisations ==
As of 2024 the ITUC has 339 affiliated organisations.

Organisation	Country	Membership as of 2012
Confederation of the Trade Unions of Albania (KSSH)	Albania	105,000
Union of the Independent Trade Unions of Albania (BSPSH)	Albania	84,000
Union Générale des Travailleurs Algériens (UGTA)	Algeria	1,875,520
Central Geral de Sindicatos Independentes e Livres de Angola (CGSILA)	Angola	93,000
União Nacional dos Trabalhadores de Angola (UNTA-CS)	Angola	215,548
Antigua & Barbuda Public Service Association (ABPSA)	Antigua and Barbuda	365
Antigua & Barbuda Workers' Union (ABWU)	Antigua and Barbuda	3,000
Central de los Trabajadores Argentinos (CTA)	Argentina	600,000
Confederación General del Trabajo de la República Argentina (CGT)	Argentina	4,401,023
Federacion di trahadornan di Aruba (FTA)	Aruba	2,507
Australian Council of Trade Unions (ACTU)	Australia	1,761,400
Österreichischer Gewerkschaftsbund (ÖGB)	Austria	1,222,190
Azerbaycan Hemkarlar Ittifaqlari Konfederasiyasi (AHIK)	Azerbaijan	735,000
General Federation of Bahrain Trade Unions (GFBTU)	Bahrain	10,000
Bangladesh Free Trade Union Congress (BFTUC)	Bangladesh	85,000
Bangladesh Jatyatabadi Sramik Dal (BJSD)	Bangladesh	180,000
Bangladesh Labour Federation (BLF)	Bangladesh	102,000
Bangladesh Mukto Sramik Federation (BMSF)	Bangladesh	204,000
Bangladesh Sanjukta Sramik Federation (BSSF)	Bangladesh	155,000
Jatio Sramik League (JSL)	Bangladesh	150,000
Barbados Workers' Union (BWU)	Barbados	15,000
Belarusian Congress of Democratic Trade Unions (BKDP)	Belarus	9,000
Centrale générale des syndicats libéraux de Belgique (CGSLB)	Belgium	274,308
Confédération des Syndicats Chrétiens (CSC-ACV)	Belgium	1,603,075
Fédération Générale du Travail de Belgique (FGTB)	Belgium	1,517,538
National Trade Union Congress of Belize (NTUCB)	Belize	8,000
Confédération des Organisations Syndicales Indépendantes du Bénin (COSI)	Benin	53,470
Confédération des Syndicats Autonomes du Bénin (CSA)	Benin	60,000
Confédération Générale des Travailleurs du Bénin (CGTB)	Benin	90,751
Union Nationale des Syndicats des Travailleurs du Bénin (UNSTB)	Benin	36,000
Bermuda Industrial Union (BIU)	Bermuda	4,000
Bermuda Trade Union Congress (BTUC)	Bermuda	5,000
Federación Boneriana di Trabao (FEDEBON)	Bonaire	500
Konfederacija Sindikata Bosne I Hercegovine (KSBiH)	Bosnia-Herzegovina	223,000
Botswana Federation of Trade Unions (BFTU)	Botswana	56,000
Central Única dos Trabalhadores (CUT)	Brazil	7,824,215
Confederação Nacional das Profissões Liberais (CNPL)	Brazil	280,000
Força Sindical (FS)	Brazil	2,100,000
União Geral dos Trabalhadores Brasil (UGT)	Brazil	1,350,200
Confederation of Independent Trade Unions of Bulgaria (KNSB / CITUB)	Bulgaria	220,000
Confederation of Labour Podkrepa	Bulgaria	150,730
Confédération Nationale des Travailleurs Burkinabé (CNTB)	Burkina Faso	10,500
Confédération Syndicale Burkinabé (CSB)	Burkina Faso	19,386
Organisation Nationale des Syndicats Libres (ONSL)	Burkina Faso	42,500
Union Syndicale des Travailleurs du Burkina (USTB)	Burkina Faso	8,700
Federation of Trade Unions – Burma (FTUB)	Burma	10,000
Confédération des Syndicats du Burundi (COSYBU)	Burundi	12,000
Confédération Syndicale du Burundi (CSB)	Burundi	5,500
Cambodia Confederation of Trade Unions (CCTU)	Cambodia	10,000
Cambodian Confederation of Unions (CCU)	Cambodia	95,616
Cambodian Labor Confederation (CLC)	Cambodia	63,880
Confédération des Syndicats Autonomes du Cameroun (CSAC)	Cameroon	75,000
Confédération Syndicale des Travailleurs du Cameroun (CSTC)	Cameroon	150,000
Unions des Syndicats Libres du Cameroun (USLC)	Cameroon	50,000
Canadian Labour Congress/Congrès du travail du Canada (CLC-CTC)	Canada	1,500,000
Centrale des syndicats démocratiques (CSD)	Canada	72,750
Confédération des syndicats nationaux (CSN)	Canada	300,000
Confederaçao Caboverdiana dos Sindicatos Livres (CCSL)	Cape Verde	19,786
União Nacional dos Trabalhadores de Cabo Verde – Central Sindical (UNTC-CS)	Cape Verde	15,000
Confédération Nationale des Travailleurs de Centrafrique (CNTC)	Central African Republic	15,998
Confédération Syndicale des Travailleurs de Centrafrique (CSTC)	Central African Republic	11,124
Confédération Libre des Travailleurs du Tchad (CLTT)	Chad	42,000
Union des Syndicats du Tchad (UST)	Chad	55,300
Central Autónoma de Trabajadores de Chile (CAT)	Chile	107,000
Central Unitaria de Trabajadores de Chile (CUT)	Chile	400,000
Unión Nacional de Trabajadores de Chile (UNT)	Chile	92,000
Central Unitaria de Trabajadores (CUT)	Colombia	510,455
Confederación de Trabajadores de Colombia (CTC)	Colombia	250,000
Confederación General del Trabajo (CGT)	Colombia	700,000
Confédération des Travailleuses et Travailleurs des Comores (CTTC)	Comoros	5,000
Confédération des Syndicats Libres et Autonomes du Congo (COSYLAC)	Congo	19,000
Confédération Syndicale Congolaise (CSC)	Congo	36,391
Confédération Syndicale des Travailleurs du Congo (CSTC)	Congo	49,799
Confédération Démocratique du Travail (CDT)	Democratic Republic of Congo	51,000
Confédération Syndicale du Congo (CSC)	Democratic Republic of Congo	390,105
Union Nationale des Travailleurs du Congo (UNTC)	Democratic Republic of Congo	51,000
Cook Islands Workers Association Inc. (CIWA)	Cook Islands	1,200
Central del Movimiento de Trabajadores Costarricenses (CMTC)	Costa Rica	67,000
Confederación de Trabajadores Rerum Novarum (CTRN)	Costa Rica	49,815
Grenada Trades' Union Council (GTUC)	Grenada	8,000
Central General de Trabajadores de Guatemala (CGTG)	Guatemala	60,000
Confederación de Unidad Sindical de Guatemala (CUSG)	Guatemala	30,000
Unión Sindical de Trabajadores de Guatemala (UNSITRAGUA)	Guatemala	10,479
Confédération Nationale de Travailleurs de Guinée (CNTG)	Guinea	100,500
Organisation Nationale des Syndicats Libres de Guinée (ONSLG)	Guinea	43,000
Union Syndicale des Travailleurs de Guinée (USTG)	Guinea	41,000
Union Nationale des Travailleurs de Guinée Bissau (UNTGB)	Guinea-Bissau	50,000
Confédération des Travaillers des Secteurs Public & Privé (CTSP)	Haiti	9,571
Confédération des Travailleurs Haïtiens (CTH)	Haiti	65,000
Coordination Syndicale Haïtienne (CSH)	Haiti	35,000
Central General de Trabajadores (CGT)	Honduras	250,000
Confederación de Trabajadores de Honduras (CTH)	Honduras	55,000
Confederación Unitaria de Trabajadores de Honduras (CUTH)	Honduras	295,000
Hong Kong and Kowloon Trades Union Council (HKTUC)	Hong Kong SAR, China	5,000
Hong Kong Confederation of Trade Unions (HKCTU)	Hong Kong SAR, China	170,000
Autonomous Trade Union Confederation (ATUC)	Hungary	109,213
Democratic League of Independent Trade Unions (LIGA)	Hungary	112,000
Magyar Szakszervezetek Országos Szövetsége (MSZOSZ)	Hungary	400,000
National Federation of Workers' Councils (MOSZ)	Hungary	45,186
Alþýðusamband Íslands / Icelandic Confederation of Labour (ASI)	Iceland	96,722
Bandalag starfsmanna ríkis og bæja (BSRB)	Iceland	19,000
Hind Mazdoor Sabha (HMS)	India	5,788,822
Indian National Trade Union Congress (INTUC)	India	8,200,000
Self-Employed Women's Association (SEWA)	India	1,351,493
Confederation of Indonesian Trade Unions (CITU/KSPI)	Indonesia	507,000
Konfederasi Serikat Buruh Sejahtera Indonesia (KSBSI)	Indonesia	520,000
Irish Congress of Trade Unions (ICTU)	Ireland	833,486
General Federation of Labour in Israel (HISTADRUT)	Israel	450,000
Confederazione Generale Italiana del Lavoro (CGIL)	Italy	5,542,677
Confederazione Italiana Sindacati Lavoratori (CISL)	Italy	4,507,349
Unione Italiana del Lavoro (UIL)	Italy	2,174,151
Japanese Trade Union Confederation (JTUC-Rengo)	Japan	6,622,468
General Federation of Jordanian Trade Unions (GFJTU)	Jordan	120,000
Central Organisation of Trade Unions (COTU(K))	Kenya	234,000
Kiribati Trades Union Congress (KTUC)	Kiribati	3,000
Federation of Korean Trade Unions (FKTU)	Korea, South	878,628
Korean Confederation of Trade Unions (KCTU)	Korea, South	812,500
Bashkimi I Sindikatave të Pavarura të Kosovës (BSPK)	Kosovo	70,486
Kuwait Trade Union Federation (KTUF)	Kuwait	35,000
Free Trade Union Confederation of Latvia (LBAS)	Republic of Latvia	100,035
Liberia Labour Congress (LLC)	Liberia	42,000
Liechtensteinischer ArbeitnehmerInnenverband (LANV)	Liechtenstein	895
Lithuanian Labour Federation (LDF)	Republic of Lithuania	18,500
Lithuanian Trade Union "SOLIDARUMAS" (LPSS)	Republic of Lithuania	10,000
Lithuanian Trade Union Confederation (LPSK)	Republic of Lithuania	60,000
Confédération Syndicale Indépendante du Luxembourg (OGBL)	Luxembourg	70,502
Lëtzebuerger Chrëschtleche Gewerkschafts-Bond (LCGB)	Luxembourg	36,000
Union of Independent and Autonomous Trade Unions of Macedonia (UNASM)	North Macedonia	5,300
Firaisan'ny Sendikan’ny Mpiasan’ny Madagasikara (FI.SE.MA.)	Madagascar	25,362
Fivondronamben'ny Mpiasa Malagasy Confédération des Travailleurs Malgaches (FMM)	Madagascar	15,000
Sendika Krisitianina Malgasy – Conf. Chrétienne des Syndicats Malgaches (SEKRIMA)	Madagascar	32,802
Union des Syndicats Autonomes du Madagascar (USAM)	Madagascar	5,046
Malawi Congress of Trade Unions (MCTU)	Malawi	200,000
Malaysian Trades Union Congress (MTUC)	Malaysia	400,000
Confédération Syndicale des Travailleurs du Mali (CSTM)	Mali	16,000
Union Nationale des Travailleurs du Mali (UNTM)	Mali	130,000
Confederation of Malta Trade Unions (CMTU)	Malta	30,351
General Workers' Union (GWU)	Malta	30,000
Confédération Générale des Travailleurs de Mauritanie (CGTM)	Mauritania	36,000
Confédération Libre des Travailleurs de Mauritanie (CLTM)	Mauritania	56,000
Confédération Nationale des Travailleurs de Mauritanie (CNTM)	Mauritania	37,530
Union des Travailleurs de Mauritanie (UTM)	Mauritania	29,000
Mauritius Labour Congress (MLC)	Mauritius	10,000
Mauritius Trade Union Congress (MTUC)	Mauritius	15,000
National Trade Unions Confederation (NTUC)	Mauritius	35,000
Confederación de Trabajadores de México (CTM)	Mexico	1,500,000
Confederación Revolucionaria de Obreros y Campesinos (CROC)	Mexico	1,251,000
Consejo Nacional de los Trabajadores (CNT)	Mexico	6,000
Unión Nacional de Trabajadores	Mexico	180,000
Confederatia Nationala a Sindicatelor din Moldova (CNSM)	Moldova	401,601
Confederation of Mongolian Trade Unions (CMTU)	Mongolia	450,000
Confederation of Trade Unions of Montenegro (SSCG)	Republic of Montenegro	62,000
Confédération Démocratique du Travail (CDT)	Morocco	61,500
Union Générale des Travailleurs du Maroc (UGTM)	Morocco	750,550
Union Marocaine du Travail (UMT)	Morocco	335,000
Organizaçâo dos Trabalhadores de Moçambique (OTM)	Mozambique	97,305
National Union of Namibian Workers (NUNW)	Namibia	80,000
Trade Union Congress of Namibia (TUCNA)	Namibia	42,100
All Nepal Federation of Trade Unions (ANTUF)	Nepal	615,233
General Federation of Nepalese Trade Unions (GEFONT)	Nepal	330,619
Nepal Trade Union Congress Independent (NTUC-I)	Nepal	140,000
Christelijk Nationaal Vakverbond (CNV)	Netherlands	299,000
Federatie Nederlandse Vakbeweging (FNV)	Netherlands	1,370,884
Union des Syndicats des Ouvriers et Employés de Nouvelle Calédonie (USOENC)	New Caledonia	4,781
New Zealand Council of Trade Unions (NZCTU)	New Zealand	200,000
Central de Trabajadores de Nicaragua (CTN)	Nicaragua	25,410
Central Sandinista de Trabajadores (CST)	Nicaragua	40,000
Confederación de Unificación Sindical (CUS)	Nicaragua	30,000
Frente Nacional de los Trabajadores (FNT)	Nicaragua	139,300
Confédération Démocratique des Travailleurs du Niger (CDTN)	Niger	34,985
Confédération Nigérienne du Travail (CNT)	Niger	75,000
Union des Syndicats des Travailleurs du Niger (USTN)	Niger	43,000
Trade Union Congress of Nigeria (TUC)	Nigeria	500,000
Confederation of Unions for Professionals	Norway	300,000
Confederation of Vocational Unions (YS)	Norway	209,344
Landsorganisasjonen i Norge (LO)	Norway	880,769
All Pakistan Trade Union Congress (APTUC)	Pakistan	110,000
Pakistan Workers' Federation (PWF)	Pakistan	500,000
Palestine General Federation of Trade Unions (PGFTU)	Palestine	318,052
Confederación de Trabajadores de la República de Panamá (CTRP)	Panama	40,000
Confederación General de Trabajadores de Panamá (CGTP)	Panama	53,250
Convergencia Sindical (CS)	Panama	33,800
Central Nacional de Trabajadores (CNT)	Paraguay	120,840
Central Unitaria de Trabajadores Auténtica (CUT-A)	Paraguay	40,000
Central Autónoma de Trabajadores del Perú (CATP)	Peru	12,705
Central Unitaria de Trabajadores del Perú (CUT)	Peru	25,000
Alliance of Progressive Labour (APL)	Philippines	50,821
Federation of Free Workers (FFW)	Philippines	27,078
Trade Union Congress of the Philippines (TUCP)	Philippines	475,000
Niezależny Samorządny Związek Zawodowy "Solidarność" (NSZZ)	Poland	622,596
Ogólnopolskie Porozumienie Związków Zawodowych (OPZZ)	Poland	320,000
União Geral de Trabalhadores (UGT-P)	Portugal	260,000
Blocul National Sindical (BNS)	Romania	150,000
Confederația Națională Sindicală Cartel Alfa (Cartel ALFA)	Romania	1,050,000
Confederaţia Sindicatelor Democratice din România (CSDR)	Romania	101,000
Confederația Națională a Sindicatelor Libere din România (CNSLR-FRATIA)	Romania	400,000
Confederation of Labour of Russia (KTR)	Russian Federation	2,100,000
Federation of Independent Trade Unions of Russia (FNPR)	Russian Federation	27,800,000
Centrale des Syndicats des Travailleurs du Rwanda (CESTRAR)	Rwanda	72,000
Congrès du Travail et de la Fraternité au Rwanda (COTRAF)	Rwanda	20,000
National Workers Union – St. Lucia (NWU)	Saint Lucia	3,000
St. Lucia Seamen, Waterfront & General Workers' Trade Union (SWGWTU)	Saint Lucia	1,000
Samoa Trade Union Congress (STUC)	Samoa	2,000
Confederazione Democratica Lavoratori Sammarinesi (CDLS)	San Marino	6,715
Confederazione Sammarinese del Lavoro (CSDL)	San Marino	5,700
Organizaçâo Nacional dos Trabalhadores de São Tomé e Principe -Central Sindical (ONTSTP-CS)	Sao Tome and Principe	4,000
União Geral de Trabalhadores de São Tomé e Príncipe (UGT-STP)	Sao Tome and Principe	7,684
Confédération des Syndicats Autonomes du Sénégal (CSA)	Senegal	40,000
Confédération Nationale des Travailleurs du Sénégal – Forces du Changement (CNTS-FC)	Senegal	14,000
Confédération Nationale des Travailleurs du Sénégal (CNTS)	Senegal	70,000
Union Démocratique des Travailleurs du Sénegal (UDTS)	Senegal	20,000
Union Nationale des Syndicats Autonomes du Sénégal (UNSAS)	Senegal	53,000
Confederation of Autonomous Trade Unions of Serbia (CATUS)	Serbia	465,000
Ujedinjeni Granski Sindikati Nezavisnost (NEZAVISNOST)	Serbia	128,000
Central Confederation of Trade Unions (CCOTU)	Sierra Leone	8,340
Sierra Leone Labour Congress (SLLC)	Sierra Leone	54,550
National Trades Union Congress (NTUC)	Singapore	229,000
Confederation of Trade Unions of the Slovak Republic (KOZSR)	Slovakia	260,780
Confederation of South African Workers' Unions (CONSAWU)	South Africa	49,730
Congress of South African Trade Unions (COSATU)	South Africa	1,800,000
Federation of Unions of South Africa (FEDUSA)	South Africa	310,000
National Council of Trade Unions (NACTU)	South Africa	310,000
Korean Confederation of Trade Unions (KCTU)	South Korea	1,134,000
Korean Trade Union Federation (FKTU)	South Korea	1,153,000
Confederación Sindical de Comisiones Obreras (CC.OO.)	Spain	900,000
Euskal Sindikatua ELA (ELA)	Spain	115,000
Unión General de Trabajadores (UGT)	Spain	880,000
Unión Sindical Obrera (USO)	Spain	112,000
Ceylon Workers' Congress (CWC)	Sri Lanka	190,000
National Trade Union Federation (NTUF)	Sri Lanka	400,000
National Workers' Congress (NWC)	Sri Lanka	82,972
Sri Lanka Nidahas Sevaka Sangamaya (SLNSS)	Sri Lanka	68,000
Algemeen Verbond van Vakverenigingen in Suriname "De Moederbond"	Surinam	6,000
Organisatie van Samenwerkende Autonome Vakbonden (OSAV)	Surinam	5,000
Trade Union Congress of Swaziland (TUCOSWA)	Swaziland	76,000
Landsorganisationen i Sverige (LO)	Sweden	1,564,767
Sveriges Akademikers Centralorganisation (SACO)	Sweden	579,874
Tjänstemännens Centralorganisation (TCO)	Sweden	961,650
Schweizerischer Gewerkschaftsbund / Union syndicale Suisse (SGB)	Switzerland	377,327
Chinese Federation of Labour (CFL)	Taiwan	250,000
Trade Unions' Congress of Tanzania (TUCTA)	Tanzania	350,000
Zanzibar Trade Union Congress (ZATUC)	Tanzania	15,000
Labour Congress of Thailand (LCT)	Thailand	25,000
National Congress Private Industrial of Employees (NCPE)	Thailand	150,000
State Enterprises Workers' Relations Confederation (SERC)	Thailand	50,000
Thai Trade Union Congress (TTUC)	Thailand	8,000
Confédération Nationale des Travailleurs du Togo (CNTT)	Togo	55,000
Confédération Syndicale des Travailleurs du Togo (CSTT)	Togo	79,172
Union Nationale des Syndicats Indépendants du Togo (UNSIT)	Togo	9,000
Tonga National Trade Union Congress (TNTUC)	Tonga	1,000
All Trinidad General Workers' Trade Union (ATGWTU)	Trinidad and Tobago	500
National Trade Union Centre of Trinidad and Tobago (NATUC)	Trinidad and Tobago	45,000
Union Générale Tunisienne du Travail (UGTT)	Tunisia	517,000
Devrimci Isçi Sendikalari Konfederasyonu (DISK)	Turkey	30,000
Kamu Emekçileri Sendikalari Konfederasyonu (KESK)	Turkey	200,000
Türkiye Hak Isçi Sendikalari Konfederasyonu (HAK-IS)	Turkey	330,000
Türkiye Isçi Sendikalari Konfederasyonu (TÜRK-IS)	Turkey	820,000
National Organisation of Trade Unions (NOTU)	Uganda	146,000
All-Ukrainian Union of Workers' Solidarity (VOST)	Ukraine	151,120
Confederation of Free Trade Unions of Ukraine (KVPU)	Ukraine	267,000
Federation of Trade Unions of Ukraine (FPU)	Ukraine	8,480,000
American Federation of Labor and Congress of Industrial Organizations (AFL-CIO)	USA	8,400,000
Vanuatu Council of Trade Unions (VCTU)	Vanuatu	2,388
Associazione Dipendenti Laici Vaticani (ADLV)	Vatican	1,000
Alianza Sindical Independiente (ASI)	Venezuela	120,000
General Federation of Worker's Trade Unions of Yemen (GFWTUY)	Yemen	350,000
Zambia Congress of Trade Unions (ZCTU)	Zambia	350,000
Zimbabwe Congress of Trade Unions (ZCTU)	Zimbabwe	241,998
Confédération générale autonome des travailleurs en Algérie (CGATA)	Algeria	
Central de los Trabajadores Argentinos – Autónoma (CTA-A)	Argentina	
Confederation of Trade Unions of Armenia (HAMK)	Armenia	
Nova Central Sindical de Trabalhadores (NCST)	Brazil	
Centrale des Syndicats de Secteurs Privé, Parapublic et Informel du Bénin (CSPIB)	Benin	
Centrale Syndicale du Secteur Public (CSP)	Benin	
Central Social Juanito Mora Porras (CSJMP)	Costa Rica	
Centrale syndicale Humanisme (CSH)	Côte d'Ivoire	
Confédération Ecuatoriana de Organizaciones Clasistas Unitarias de Trabajadores (CEDOCUT)	Ecuador	
Confédération Ecuatoriana de Organizaciones Sindicales Libres (CEOSL)	Ecuador	
Egyptian Democratic Labour Congress (EDLC)	Egypt	
Egyptian Federation of Independent Trade Unions (EFITU)	Egypt	
Confederación Sindical Trabajadoras y Trabajadores de El Salvador (CSTS)	El Salvador	
Icelandic Confederation of University Graduates (BHM)	Iceland	
Confederation of Independent Trade Unions of Kazakhstan (CNTUK)	Kazakhstan	
Federations of Trade Unions of Kazakhstan (FPRK)	Kazakhstan	
Lesotho Labour Council (LLC)	Lesotho	
General Federation of Trade Unions in Libya (GFTUL)	Libya	
Confederation of Trade Unions – Myanmar (CTUM)	Myanmar	
Maldives Trade Union Congress (MTUC)	Maldives	
Congress of Independent Trade Unions (CITU)	Nepal	
Confédération des Travailleurs du Secteur Privé (CTSP)	Rwanda	
Timor Leste Trade Union Confederation (TLTUC/KSTL)	Timor Leste	
South African Federation of Trade Unions (SAFTU)	South Africa	
Federation of Somali Trade Unions (FESTU)	Somalia	
Solomons Islands Council of Trade Unions (SICTU)	Solomon Islands	
South Sudan Workers Trade Union Federation (SSWTUF)	South Sudan	
Confederation of Free Trade Unions of India (CFTUI)	India	
Kilusang Mayo Uno (KMU)	Philippines	125,000
Sentro ng mga Nagkakaisa at Progresibong Manggagawa (SENTRO)	Philippines	
Unione Sammarinese Lavoratori (USL)	San Marino	

== See also ==
- Decent work
- General Confederation of Trade Unions
- Global Rights Index
- Global union federation
- International Labour Organization
- List of federations of trade unions
- World Federation of Trade Unions

== Bibliography ==
- Fabio Bertini (2011), Gilliatt e la piovra. Il sindacalismo internazionale dalle origini ad oggi (1776–2006), Roma, Aracne
- Ed Mustill (2013), The Global Labour Movement: An Introduction, a short guide to the global union federations, the ITUC, and other international bodies
