= International Centre for Trade Union Rights =

Organizing and campaigning body

The International Centre for Trade Union Rights (ICTUR) is "an organizing and campaigning body with the fundamental purpose of defending and improving the rights of trade unions and trade unionists throughout the world." ICTUR has accredited status with both the United Nations and the International Labour Organization.

== Publications ==
- International Union Rights is a quarterly journal published by ICTUR and edited by Daniel Blackburn. It covers a variety of labour related issues.
- Blackburn, Daniel; Cross, Ciaran, eds. (2021). Trade Unions of the World (8th ed.). London: International Centre for Trade Union Rights (ICTUR). ISBN 978-0993355622.
