= European Trade Union Confederation =

European union federation

ETUC
- European Trade Union Confederation
- Founded: 1973
- Headquarters: Brussels, Belgium
- Location: European Union
- Members: 45 million from 41 countries, 93 national trade union confederations
- Key people: Esther Lynch, General Secretary; Wolfgang Katzian, President
- Website: www.etuc.org

The European Trade Union Confederation (ETUC) is a trade union organisation representing workers at the European level. In its role as a European social partner, the ETUC works both in a consulting role with the European Commission and negotiates agreements and work programmes with European employers. It coordinates the national and sectoral policies of its affiliates on social and economic matters, particularly in the framework of the EU institutional processes, including European economic governance and the European Semester.

== History ==
The ETUC was established in 1973, to coordinate and represent workers and their trade unions at the European level, and has grown as more countries have joined the EU.

== Representativeness and constitution ==
At present, the ETUC represents almost 45 million workers across Europe, and comprises 94 national trade union confederations in 42 countries, in addition to 10 European Trade Union Federations (ETUFs). It includes both a Women's Committee and a Youth Committee, which represent the interests of these two groups within its membership respectively.

Currently, the General Secretary of the organisation is Esther Lynch, who was elected in December 2022. The President is Wolfgang Katzian, from OEGB of Austria. The Deputy General Secretaries are Claes-Mikael Stahl and Isabelle Schömann; the Confederal Secretaries are Giulio Romani, Tea Jarc and Ludovic Voet.

The ETUC coordinates the activities of the 45 Interregional Trade Union Councils (IRTUCs), which organise trade union cooperation across national borders in the EU and defend the right to free movement of workers. In cooperation with the European Trade Union Institute, the ETUC has set up UnionMigrantNet, a network of trade union contact points within the member states, with the aim of assisting migrants and their families. Other trade union structures operating under the auspices of the ETUC are Eurocadres (Council of European Professional and Managerial Staff) and the European Federation of Retired and Older People (FERPA).

The ETUC's delegate congress, which takes place every four years, approves and amends the constitution, determines the strategy and general policy of the Confederation and elects its leadership team. All policies and activities are agreed by affiliates' representatives, who maintain their own independence. The 15th congress] took place in Berlin in May 2023.

== Mission and activities ==
The ETUC states that its objectives include the promotion of the European social model, social protection, and equal opportunities. Its activities focus on employment rights, living standards, and the involvement of citizens in democratic policy-making processes. At the 2015 Paris Congress, the ETUC agreed on a Manifesto and an Action Programme for four years until 2019. These documents focus on three objectives:

- A strong economy that serves the people
- Stronger unions for democratic values and democracy at work
- A core of ambitious social standards

A strong economy

The ETUC works with all the EU governing bodies: Presidency, Council, Commission and Parliament. Its right to represent the interests of European workers in the formulation of EU macroeconomic and employment policy is articulated in the EU Treaty. It takes part in bi-annual Tripartite Social Summits; responds to European Commission proposals; liaises with a cross-party Intergroup of MEPs in the European Parliament; and coordinates trade union participation in a number of advisory bodies, including the tripartite EU agencies for vocational training (CEDEFOP), improvement of living and working conditions (Eurofound), and health and safety (EU-OSHA). It works closely with the Workers' Group in the Economic and Social Committee.

At the meetings of the Macroeconomic Dialogue (MED), established in 1998, the social partners discuss economic policy with the EU Economic and Financial Affairs Council (ECOFIN), the European Central Bank (ECB), and the commission. The ETUC wants greater trade union participation in economic governance at both EU and national levels. The ETUC supports public investment, a green economy, fair taxation and quality jobs for all. It opposes precarious work and austerity policies.

Stronger unions

The ETUC promotes collective bargaining, social dialogue, and industrial democracy. It therefore promotes capacity building for trade unions across Europe. The social dialogue between the ETUC and European employers supplements the national social dialogues in the Member States. The ETUC supports European Works Councils, and workers' consultation and participation in decision-making. EU cross-industry social dialogue was formally launched in 1985, with the support of former Commission President Jacques Delors. It has evolved through three stages: I – (1985–1991) Bipartite activities culminated in the adoption of resolutions, declarations and common opinions, which did not have a binding effect. II – (1992–1999) An accord between the social partners, signed on 31 October 1991 and subsequently annexed to the 1992 Maastricht Treaty in the form of a Social Protocol, enabled European social partner agreements to have legal force through a Council decision. In 1997, the agreement was written into the Treaty of Amsterdam (Articles 154 and 155 TFEU). European social dialogue led to the implementation of three framework agreements (parental leave in 1995 – revised in 2009, part-time work in 1997, and fixed-term contracts in 1999) via EU Directives. III – (1999–2005) In December 2001, the European social partners presented a "common contribution" to the Laeken European Council. In accordance with the 1991 agreement (Art. 155 par 2 TFEU), this moved towards greater independence and autonomy of the social dialogue. Since 2002, the social partners have concluded autonomous agreements on:

- Telework (2002)
- Work-related stress (2004)
- Harassment and violence at work (2007)
- Inclusive labour markets (2010)
- A framework of actions for the lifelong development of competencies and qualifications (2002), a framework of actions on gender equality (2005), and a framework of actions on youth employment (2013).

These are implemented by the social partners themselves at national, regional and enterprise levels. The social partners' new Multiannual Work Programme runs until 2017 and foresees an accord on active ageing. In the field of collective bargaining and wage policy, the ETUC has coordinated affiliates' activities since 1999. In 2012, the ETUC also started to coordinate trade union participation in EU economic governance and the Semester process. Every year the ETUC updates its priorities and initiatives on industrial relations and wage developments, with a view to improving working and living conditions across Europe, achieving better wages for all workers, ensuring equal treatment, combating inequalities, supporting capacity building for sound industrial relations and promote collective bargaining in all EU countries. The ETUC favours a holistic approach to workers' involvement, including stronger information and consultation rights, board-level participation in European company forms, and support for European Works Councils. The ETUC presses for information and consultation for workers, in particular, to anticipate change or company restructuring (to cut job losses), and throughout the subcontracting chain.

Ambitious social standards

The ETUC advocates for public services, social protection, gender equality, and health and safety standards. It opposes discrimination and social dumping. The ETUC supports the European social model, citing its role in social cohesion and economic growth. The ETUC organizes direct actions, including demonstrations and campaigns, and works with civil society partners to achieve social justice and progress for workers and their families across Europe. The ETUC is recognised by the European Union, by the Council of Europe and by the European Free Trade Association as the only representative cross-sectoral trade union organisation at the European level.

Future challenges

During its congress in Paris, the ETUC discussed the role of trade unionism in the context of globalization and austerity policies. The discussion has been widened to address the future of the EU, facing challenges like the refugee emergency, Brexit, rising populism and xenophobia, and widespread discontent among citizens and workers about their economic and social conditions. The ETUC is launching campaigns and actions, including on a fairer, sustainable economic model, quality job creation, just transition and fair trade, higher pay and wage convergence for European workers, better protection for disadvantaged, precarious and self-employed workers, and more democracy at work, in the economy and in EU institutions.

== Affiliates ==
| Affiliate | Abbreviation | Country |
|---|---|---|
| All-Poland Alliance of Trade Unions | OPZZ | Poland |
| Association of Estonian Trade Unions | EAKL | Estonia |
| Austrian Trade Union Federation | OGB | Austria |
| Basque Workers' Union | ELA | Spain |
| Central Organisation of Finnish Trade Unions | SAK | Finland |
| Confederation of Autonomous Trade Unions of Serbia | CATUS | Serbia |
| Confederation of Christian Trade Unions | ACV/CSC | Belgium |
| Confederation of Greek Civil Servants' Trade Unions | ADEDY | Greece |
| Confederation of Independent Trade Unions of Bulgaria | CITUB | Bulgaria |
| Confederation of Labour | PODKREPA | Bulgaria |
| Confederation of Malta Trade Unions | CMTU | Malta |
| Confederation of Progressive Trade Unions of Turkey | DISK | Turkey |
| Confederation of Public Employees' Trade Unions | KESK | Turkey |
| Confederation of State and Municipal Employees | BSRB | Iceland |
| Confederation of Trade Unions of the Slovak Republic | KOZ SR | Slovakia |
| Confederation of Turkish Real Trade Unions | HAK-IS | Turkey |
| Confederation of Turkish Trade Unions | TURK-IS | Turkey |
| Confederation of Unions for Professional and Managerial Staff in Finland | AKAVA | Finland |
| Confederation of Unions for the Professionals | UNIO | Norway |
| Confederation of Unions of Professionals | ÉSZT | Hungary |
| Confederation of Vocational Trade Unions | YS | Norway |
| Cyprus Workers' Confederation | SEK | Cyprus |
| Czech Moravian Confederation of Trade Unions | CMK OS | Czech Republic |
| Danish Confederation of Professional Associations | AC | Denmark |
| Danish Trade Union Confederation | FH | Denmark |
| Democratic Confederation of San Marino Workers | CDLS | San Marino |
| Democratic Labour Federation of Cyprus | DEOK | Cyprus |
| Democratic League of Independent Trade Unions | LIGA | Hungary |
| Democratic Trade Union Confederation of Romania | CSDR | Romania |
| Estonian Employees' Unions' Association | TALO | Estonia |
| Federation of Trade Unions of Macedonia | SSM | North Macedonia |
| Finnish Confederation of Professionals | STTK | Finland |
| Forum of Maltese Unions | FOR.U.M | Malta |
| Forum for the Co-operation of Trade Unions | SZEF | Hungary |
| French Confederation of Christian Workers | CFTC | France |
| French Democratic Confederation of Labour | CFDT | France |
| General Confederation of Labour | CGT | France |
| General Confederation of Labour - Workers' Power | FO | France |
| General Confederation of Liberal Trade Unions of Belgium | CGSLB/ACLVB | Belgium |
| General Confederation of Labour of Luxembourg | OGBL | Luxembourg |
| General Confederation of Portuguese Workers | CGTP-IN | Portugal |
| General Labour Federation of Belgium | ABVV/FGTB | Belgium |
| General Workers' Union | GWU | Malta |
| General Workers' Union - Portugal | UGT-P | Portugal |
| General Workers' Union - Spain | UGT-E | Spain |
| German Confederation of Trade Unions | DGB | Germany |
| Greek General Confederation of Labour | GSEE | Greece |
| Hungarian Trade Union Confederation | MASZSZ | Hungary |
| Iceland Confederation of Academics | BHM | Iceland |
| Icelandic Confederation of Labour | ASI | Iceland |
| Independence Trade Union Confederation | NEZAVISNOST | Serbia |
| Independent and Self-Governing Trade Union "Solidarność" | NSZZ | Poland |
| Independent Trade Unions of Croatia | NHS | Croatia |
| Irish Congress of Trade Unions | ICTU | Ireland |
| Italian Confederation of Workers' Trade Unions | CISL | Italy |
| Italian General Confederation of Labour | CGIL | Italy |
| Italian Union of Labour | UIL | Italy |
| Liechtenstein Federation of Employees | LANV | Liechtenstein |
| Lithuanian Labour Federation | LDF | Lithuania |
| Lithuanian Trade Union Confederation | LPSK/LTUC | Lithuania |
| Lithuanian Trade Union "Solidarumas" | LPSS (LDS) | Lithuania |
| Luxembourg Christian Trade Union Confederation | LCGB | Luxembourg |
| Macedonian Confederation Of Free Trade Unions | KSS | North Macedonia |
| National Confederation of Free Trade Unions of Romania | FRATIA | Romania |
| National Federation of Christian Trade Unions | CNV | Netherlands |
| National Federation of Workers' Councils | MOSz | Hungary |
| National Trade Union Bloc | BMS | Romania |
| National Trade Union Confederation | Cartel ALFA | Romania |
| National Union of Autonomous Trade Unions | UNSA | France |
| Netherlands Trade Union Confederation | FNV | Netherlands |
| Norwegian Confederation of Trade Unions | LO-N | Norway |
| San Marino Labour Confederation | CSdL | San Marino |
| Slovenian Association of Free Trade Unions | ZSSS | Slovenia |
| Swedish Confederation of Professional Associations | SACO | Sweden |
| Swedish Confederation of Professional Employees | TCO | Sweden |
| Swedish Trade Union Confederation | LO-S | Sweden |
| Swiss Trade Union Confederation | SGB | Switzerland |
| Swiss Workers | TravailSuisse | Switzerland |
| Trade Union Andorra | USDA | Andorra |
| Trade Union Confederation of Workers' Commissions | CC.OO | Spain |
| Trade Union Federation for Professionals | VCP | Netherlands |
| Trade Unions Forum | FZZ | Poland |
| Trades Union Congress | TUC | United Kingdom |
| Turkish Workers' Trade Union Federation | TURK-SEN | Cyprus |
| Union of Autonomous Trade Unions of Croatia | SSSH/UATUC | Croatia |
| Union of Free Trade Unions of Montenegro | UFTUM | Montenegro |
| Union of Independent Trade Unions of Latvia | LBAS | Latvia |
| Union of San Marino Workers | USL | San Marino |
| Union of Trade Unions of Monaco | USM | Monaco |
| Workers' Union - Spain | USO | Spain |
| Federation of Trade Unions of Ukraine | FPU | Ukraine |
| Confederation of Free Trade Unions of Ukraine | KVPU | Ukraine |

== General Secretaries and Presidents ==
| General Secretaries | Period | Union |
|---|---|---|
| Théo Rasschaert | 1973–1975 | ABVV, Belgium |
| Peer Carlsen | 1975–1976 | LO, Denmark |
| Mathias Hinterscheid | 1976–1991 | CGT-L, Luxemburg |
| Emilio Gabaglio | 1991–2003 | CISL, Italy |
| John Monks | 2003–2011 | TUC, United Kingdom |
| Bernadette Ségol | 2011–2015 | UNI-Europa |
| Luca Visentini | 2015–2022 | UIL, Italy |
| Esther Lynch | 2022–Present | ICTU, Ireland |

| President | Period | Union |
|---|---|---|
| Victor Feather | 1973–1974 | TUC, United Kingdom |
| Heinz Oskar Vetter | 1974–1979 | DGB, Germany |
| Wim Kok | 1979–1982 | FNV, Netherlands |
| Georges Debunne | 1982–1985 | ABVV, Belgium |
| Ernst Breit | 1985–1991 | DGB, Germany |
| Norman Willis | 1991–1993 | TUC, United Kingdom |
| Fritz Verzetnitsch | 1993–2003 | ÖGB, Austria |
| Cándido Méndez Rodríguez | 2003–2007 | UGT, Spain |
| Wanja Lundby-Wedin | 2007–2011 | LO, Sweden |
| Ignacio Fernández Toxo | 2011–2015 | CCOO, Spain |
| Rudy De Leeuw | 2015–2019 | ABVV, Belgium |
| Laurent Berger | 2019–2023 | CFDT, France |
| Wolfgang Katzian | 2023–present | ÖGB, Austria |

== See also ==
- Confederation of European Business
- EU labour law
- French labour law
- German labour law
- UK labour law
- Unió Sindical d'Andorra
