= Trade union federation =

Organization comprising multiple trade unions

Organizers within trade unions have sought to increase the bargaining power of workers in regards to collective bargaining by acting in collaboration with other trade unions. Multi-union organizing can take place on an informal basis, or on a more formal basis via an umbrella organization comprising multiple trade unions. Such umbrella organizations may be referred to as a trade union federation, trade union confederation, or trade union centre.

== Background ==
A prominent example of trade union federations is the national trade union federation—a.k.a. national trade union confederation or centre—which are composed of trade unions within a particular country. Most countries have a national trade union federation, with many countries having more than one.

The largest national trade union federation is the All-China Federation of Trade Unions with a total membership of 302 million as of 2017.

From 1935 to 1955 in the United States, there were two competing national trade union federations: the American Federation of Labor (AFL) and the Congress of Industrial Organizations (CIO). The AFL comprised primarily craft unions and was oriented towards the moderate and conservative end of the labour movement, while the CIO primarily comprised industrial unions which tended to be more radical. Prior to their reunification into the AFL-CIO in 1955, the two federations competed with each other for affiliates and influence. Even following their amalgamation, the AFL-CIO faced a split again in 2005 by the Change to Win Federation.

As well as national federations, trade unions may establish international federations, either along industry lines as with global union federations such as the UITBB and the International Transport Workers' Federation, or across multiple industries, as with the International Trade Union Confederation (ITUC) and the World Federation of Trade Unions (WFTU). One of the ITUC's predecessors, the International Confederation of Free Trade Unions (ICFTU), was founded as an anti-communist splinter of the WFTU.

Some federations may be founded as cross sections of workers organization and religious attitudes present, such as present within the Christian socialist or Christian democratic traditions, such as the French Confederation of Christian Workers (CFTC) and the Christian Trade Union Federation of Germany (CGB). A federation may also be founded on explicitly secular grounds such as the French Democratic Confederation of Labour (CFDT). Historically, the International Federation of Christian Trade Unions existed as an international federation of Christian trade unions, and later as the World Confederation of Labour, as it expanded to include Muslim and Buddhist trade unions as well. It was the smallest of the 3 major international federations during the cold war, and ended up merging with the ICTFU to form the ITUC.

== Examples ==
Some examples of trade union federations include:

- Argentina: General Confederation of Labour (CGT) and Argentine Workers' Central Union (CTA)
- Armenia: Confederation of Trade Unions of Armenia (CTUA)
- Australia: Australian Council of Trade Unions (ACTU)
- Brazil: Central Única dos Trabalhadores (CUT)
- Britain: Trades Union Congress (TUC), General Federation of Trade Unions (GFTU), Scottish Trades Union Congress (STUC)
- Canada: Canadian Labour Congress (CLC)
- Czechia: Czech-Moravian Confederation of Trade Unions (ČMKOS)
- Denmark: Danish Confederation of Trade Unions (LO)
- France: French Democratic Confederation of Labour (CFDT) and General Confederation of Labour (CGT)
- Germany: German Trade Union Confederation (DGB)
- Hungary: National Confederation of Hungarian Trade Unions (MSzOSz)
- India: Indian National Trade Union Congress (INTUC), All India Trade Union Congress (AITUC) and Bharatiya Mazdoor Sangh (BMS)
- Ireland: Irish Congress of Trade Unions (ICTU)
- Italy: Italian General Confederation of Labour (CGIL), Italian Confederation of Trades Unions (CSIL) and Italian Labour Union (UIL)
- Japan: Japanese Trade Union Confederation (RENGO)
- Netherlands: Federation of Dutch Trade Unions (FNV)
- Norway: Norwegian Confederation of Trade Unions (LO)
- New Zealand New Zealand Council of Trade Unions (NZCTU)
- South Africa: Congress of South African Trade Unions (COSATU)
- Spain: Workers' Commissions (CCOO), Unión Sindical Obrera (USO), General Confederation of Labour (CGT) and Confederación Nacional del Trabajo (CNT)
- Sweden: Swedish Trade Union Confederation (LO)
- USA: American Federation of Labor and Congress of Industrial Organizations (AFL-CIO) and the Strategic Organizing Center
- Uruguay: Plenario Intersindical de Trabajadores – Convención Nacional de Trabajadores (PIT-CNT)

== See also ==
- General union – alternate concept of organization
- International Labour Organization – Specialized agency of the United Nations
- List of trade unions
- Local union – trade union sub-unit
- One Big Union – alternate concept of organization
