= Trade unions in Turkey =

- National organization(s): TÜRK-İŞ, DİSK, HAK-İŞ, KESK

International Labour Organization
- Turkey is a member of the ILO

Convention ratification
- Freedom of Association: 12 July 1993
- Right to Organise: 23 January 1952

There are four national trade union centers in Turkey. The oldest and largest is the Confederation of Turkish Trade Unions (TÜRK-İŞ).

- Confederation of Turkish Trade Unions (TÜRK-İŞ, founded 1952, 1.75m members)
- Confederation of Revolutionary Trade Unions of Turkey (DİSK, founded 1967, 327,000 members)
- Confederation of Turkish Real Trade Unions (HAK-İŞ, founded 1976, 340,000 members)
- Confederation of Public Workers' Unions (KESK, founded 1995, 300,000 members)

Some unions, such as the KESK-affiliated education union Eğitim-Sen, have witnessed repeated attempts on banning and member imprisonment.

== See also ==
- Turkish labour law
