= June 15–16 events (Turkey) =

1970 protests in Istanbul

June 15-16 events (Turkey)
- Date: 15 June 1970 – 16 June 1970
- Location: Istanbul, Ankara, Adana, Bursa and İzmir

Parties
Workers and protesters; DİSK	32nd government of Turkey

The June 15–16 events (Turkish: 15–16 Haziran olayları) of 1970 began in Istanbul and soon became one of the largest actions of organized labor in Turkey's history.

== Changes in union law ==
In 1970, a bill amending two laws was passed by the Grand National Assembly of Turkey and then the Senate, the Collective Bargaining Agreement, Strike and Lockout Law No. 274, which regulated working life and basic union legislation, and the Law on Trade Unions No. 275. The bill was supported both by the governing Justice Party and the opposition Republican People's Party (CHP).

The amendment significantly restricted the freedom of workers to choose unions and made it difficult to change unions. Under the bill a union could operate nationally only if it had enrolled one third of all the workers in its branch of industry, and the same threshold applied to federations; founding a union required three years' employment at the workplace, leaving one required appearing before a notary in person, and only the largest confederation could affiliate to international labour organisations. The law entered into force on 11 June 1970 with the approval of President Cevdet Sunay.

The bill was mainly aimed at preventing the flow of workers from Türk-İş to DİSK. DİSK and its affiliated unions responded angrily to the new law and the Workers' Party of Turkey announced that it would take the controversial amendments to the Constitutional Court and filed a lawsuit to have them annulled.

== Events across Istanbul ==
The response of trade unionists and leaders of DİSK entered a new phase on the morning of 15 June 1970, when they marched towards the main centers of Istanbul. The march, which started on the Anatolian side of the city, was followed by the workers from Kartal district along the E-5 Ankara highway, while others joined them from other factories. Around Göztepe, Otosan factory workers and DMO workers joined them and the march lasted until 17:00. Another march route was in Beykoz. It started in Paşabahçe and proceeded towards Üsküdar. On 16 June, the workers' march that had started from Gebze joined with the workers from Kartal and reached the square in front of Kadıköy Pier.

On the European side of Istanbul, on 15 June 1970, a march was held along the Bakırköy - Topkapı - Sağmalcılar route. On 16 June, it joined up with branches marching in from other parts of the city and arrived at Eminönü. The authorities had the Galata and Unkapanı bridges over the Golden Horn opened and ferry services cancelled, to prevent the columns on either side from joining; some workers crossed to Beyoğlu by boat, and the rest turned back.

When the workers occupied the Haymak factory in which Prime Minister Süleyman Demirel's brother Şevket Demirel was a partner, the troops of the 2nd Armored Brigade in Kartal Maltepe surrounded the factory.

Between 70,000 and 75,000 workers from more than a hundred workplaces took part on the first day, and around 150,000 on the second. DİSK's own membership at the time was between 25,000 and 40,000. Although the reaction was mainly from DİSK member workers, many Türk-İş workers joined the marches as well, one union threatening to leave Türk-İş if the confederation did not withdraw its support for the changes.

In the evening of the second day the Council of Ministers declared a sixty-day period of martial law. (Note: Sources differ on its length. Özhazinedar gives sixty days; Urhan and Çelik describe a one-month proclamation extended by a further two months; Bianet, citing the labour historian Şehmus Güzel, says martial law ended on 17 September 1970.) Many of the leaders of DİSK and its affiliated unions were arrested and tried by martial law courts. Workers were fired at from the barricade set up in front of the Fenerbahçe stadium. Many workers were injured in the conflict that broke out here. Around Kadıköy Pier, the police opened fire on the workers killing several. On 16 June, minor incidents took place in Ankara, Adana, Bursa and İzmir.

== Aftermath and legacy ==
On 16 June, martial law was declared in Kocaeli and Istanbul, on the justification that the action had been planned not by the workers and their unions but by communists, and amounted to a rebellion. After the events 5,090 workers were dismissed and twenty-one DİSK officials arrested. The labour historian Aziz Çelik describes the resistance as shaped by an organisational decision of DİSK rather than as a spontaneous outbreak, and as an act of self-defence of the right to organise. After the 1971 military memorandum, Kemal Türkler and other DİSK officials were prosecuted on charges of inciting the public and of separatist propaganda, and were acquitted. DİSK's leadership faced the same charges before the martial-law courts again after the 1980 coup, and was again acquitted.

After the events, CHP General Secretary Bülent Ecevit, together with Chairman İsmet İnönü, also sought to have the new law annulled in the Constitutional Court, separately from The Workers' Party. The Constitutional Court annulled the amendments by its judgment of 8–9 February 1971.

Those who died on 16 June were three workers, Yaşar Yıldırım of the Mutlu Akü battery factory, Mustafa Bayram of Vinylex and Mehmet Gıdak of the Tekel factory in Cevizli, and the police officer Yusuf Kahraman. The fifth was a tradesman who had been watching the events in Kadıköy, named by soL Haber and by Bianet as Abdurrahman Bozkurt. (Note: CNN Türk gives the tradesman's name as Doğukan Dere.) More than 200 workers, police and soldiers were injured.

Two further deaths were connected with the protests: Hüseyin Çapkan, a Lastik-İş member and one of the workers who began the resistance at the Gıslaved tyre factory, and Necmettin Giritlioğlu, chairman of the Yapı-İş union, who was on strike while working on the construction of the refinery at Aliağa.

The protests of June 15–16 are commemorated by the Left in Turkey as one of the largest worker resistances in the country's history. The labour historians Canan and Yıldırım Koç describe them as the first protest in Turkey by workers organised in different confederations, in different sectors and in different cities, over demands other than wages.

The People's Liberation Party was established on 15 June 2005, the 35th anniversary of the 15–16 June Worker Resistance.

== Popular culture ==
The play Zengin Mutfağı, written by Vasıf Öngören in 1977 and later adapted into a movie in 1980, portrays the events that occurred in the kitchen of a bourgeois mansion during the 15–16 June events.

== See also ==
- Bloody Sunday (1969)
- Taksim Square massacre
- Politics of Turkey
