= 2015 Ankara bombings =

2015 terror attack during a protest movement in Ankara, Turkey

- Part of Turkey–Islamic State conflict
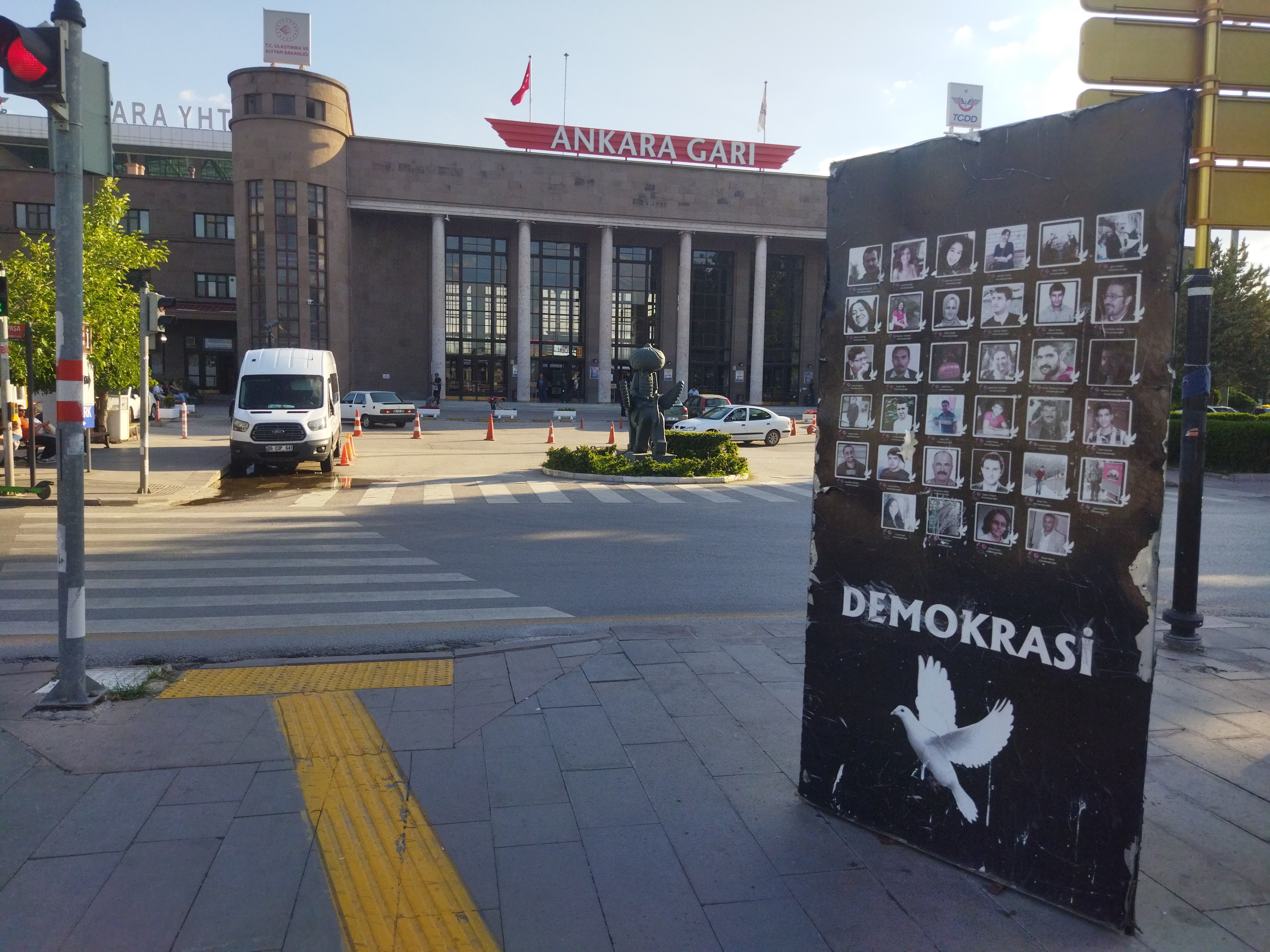
- "Democracy" memorial in front of Ankara Central railway station
- Location: 39.9364°N 32.8438°E; In front of Ankara Central railway station, Turkey
- Date: 10 October 2015; 10:04 (EEST)
- Target: Protesters
- Attack type: Suicide bombing, mass murder
- Deaths: 109
- Injuries: 500+
- Perpetrator: Islamic State

On 10 October 2015 at 10:04 local time (EEST) in Ankara, the capital city of Turkey, two bombs were detonated outside Ankara Central railway station. With a death toll of 109 civilians, the attack surpassed the 2013 Reyhanlı bombings as the deadliest terror attack in Turkish history. Another 500 people were injured. Censorship monitoring group Turkey Blocks identified nationwide slowing of social media services in the aftermath of the blasts, described by rights group Human Rights Watch as an "extrajudicial" measure to restrict independent media coverage of the incident.

The bombs appeared to target a "Labour, Peace and Democracy" rally organised by the Confederation of Progressive Trade Unions of Turkey (DİSK), the Union of Chambers of Turkish Engineers and Architects (TMMOB), the Peoples' Democratic Party (HDP), the Turkish Medical Association (TTB) and the Confederation of Public Workers' Unions (KESK). The peace march was held to protest against the growing conflict between the Turkish Armed Forces and the Kurdistan Workers' Party (PKK). The incident occurred 21 days before the scheduled 1 November general election.

The governing Justice and Development Party (AK Party), the main opposition Republican People's Party (CHP) and the opposition Nationalist Movement Party (MHP) condemned the attack and called it an attempt to cause division within Turkey. CHP and MHP leaders heavily criticized the government for the security failure, whereas HDP directly blamed the AK Party government for the bombings. Various political parties ended up cancelling their election campaigns while three days of national mourning were declared by the Prime Minister Ahmet Davutoğlu.

No organisation has ever claimed responsibility for the attack. The Ankara Attorney General stated that they were investigating the possibility of two cases of suicide bombings. On 19 October, one of the two suicide bombers was officially identified as the younger brother of the perpetrator of the Suruç bombing; both brothers had suspected links to Islamic State of Iraq and the Levant (ISIL) and the ISIL affiliated Dokumacılar group.

== Background ==
Following a suicide bombing in Suruç that killed 33 people on 20 July 2015, the Turkish Armed Forces have been fighting both the Islamic State and a renewed PKK rebellion of the Kurdistan Workers' Party (PKK). The resumption of the conflict with the PKK resulted in an end to the peace process between Turkey and the PKK, alongside a ceasefire in place since 2012. With airstrikes initially targeting both the PKK and ISIL, later military operations began focusing explicitly on PKK positions in northern Iraq, prompting a surge of counter PKK-related violence in the mainly Kurdish south-east of Turkey. By 7 October, the surge in violence since July had led to the deaths of 141 soldiers and 1,740 militants, leading to several pro-government commentators to claim that the PKK was close to defeat. However, the large number of soldiers killed also contributed to civil unrest in other parts of the country, with attacks by Turkish nationalists taking place against the Peoples' Democratic Party (HDP) headquarters. Many politicians and commentators alleged that the country was close to civil war.

=== Political situation ===
The increase in violence came shortly after the governing Justice and Development Party (AK Party) lost its majority in Parliament after 13 years of government alone in the June 2015 election. When the attacks took place, the preceding AK Party government led by Ahmet Davutoğlu remained in power until a new coalition government could be formed, with an interim election government also headed by Davutoğlu taking office on 28 August 2015 after President Recep Tayyip Erdoğan called for a new election. Critics have accused the AK Party of trying to regain nationalist voters back from the Nationalist Movement Party (MHP) by purposely ending the solution process and also trying to reduce turnout in the HDP electoral strongholds in the south-east by creating unrest there. Concern had been raised about whether an election could be securely conducted amid the violence in the region.

== Events ==
=== Perceived targets ===
The explosions occurred shortly before a 'Labour, Peace and Democracy' rally supported by the Confederation of Progressive Trade Unions of Turkey (DİSK), the Union of Chambers of Turkish Engineers and Architects (TMMOB), the Turkish Medical Association (TTB) and the Confederation of Public Workers' Unions (KESK) was due to take place. The rally was scheduled in Sıhhiye Square, the railways overpass bridge was the gathering area. It was reported that many attendants that were present in preparation for the rally were supporters of the Peoples' Democratic Party (HDP), with the rally area containing numerous HDP, Labour Party (EMEP), and Socialist Youth Associations Federation (SGDF) flags.

=== Bombings ===
On 10 October 2015, the first bomb exploded at around 10:04 local time (EEST), while rally participants were repeatedly saying "Bu meydan kanlı meydan". The second bomb exploded a few seconds later. It was also observed that the bombings were in close proximity of the National Intelligence Organisation (MİT) headquarters. Shortly after the bombing, security forces cleared the area in case of a third and fourth bomb.

=== Casualties ===
On the day of the blasts, the initial death toll was reported as 86, along with 186 wounded. Next day, the total number of deaths was announced as 97. According to the prime minister's statement on 14 October, 99 people were killed in total. The number increased in the following days, as people in the hospitals succumbed to their wounds, to 100 and to 102.

The Turkish Medical Association (TTB) made independent claims, reporting that 97 died and over 400 people had been injured, which they later updated to 105, and 106. International media speak of 109 deaths and 508 injured.

The pro-Kurdish HDP party claimed the first day that the number of deaths was 128, but after a few days retracted the statement and apologised for the misleading claim.

=== Media and internet blackouts ===
The Radio and Television Supreme Council (RTÜK) announced a temporary ban on all press coverage of the bombings following a request by the Prime Ministry. Monitoring group Turkey Blocks identified intentional slowing, or throttling, of the Twitter and Facebook social networks beginning some hours after the attack. An official claimed at the time that internet problems were "due to heavy use", although the practice of internet throttling for "peace and order" became commonplace in the following months and was ultimately recognized by the government and brought into law.

=== Immediate response ===
Witnesses at the scene told the media that the police began using tear gas shortly after the bombs went off, while stopping ambulances from getting through. Angry people tried to attack police cars after the blast, with the HDP claiming that the police attacked people carrying the injured to safety.

Shortly after the bombings, the Minister of Health Mehmet Müezzinoğlu, the Minister of the Interior Selami Altınok, and the Minister of Justice Kenan İpek visited the scene to carry out investigations. However, they were met by protestors who chanted anti-AKP slogans and were forced to leave the scene less than one minute after arriving. The Ankara Attorney General announced that they were investigating the possibility of two suicide bombers, while the Turkish State Railways (TCDD) stated that there would be delays to train services passing through the Ankara Central railway station.

Prime Minister Ahmet Davutoğlu cancelled all of his prior engagements and stated that he would halt his election campaign for three days. He met with President Recep Tayyip Erdoğan, who also cancelled his engagements in Istanbul following the incident. The Prime Minister later held a security summit, which was attended by Deputy Prime Ministers Yalçın Akdoğan, Numan Kurtulmuş, and Tuğrul Türkeş, along with National Intelligence Organisation (MİT) undersecretary Hakan Fidan, Interior Minister Selami Altınok, Justice Minister Kenan İpek, the Governor of Ankara Mehmet Kılıçlar, the General Director of Security Celalettin Lekesiz, and several other senior civil servants working for the Prime Ministry and the Ministry of Health.

== Perpetrators ==
=== Initial speculation ===
The Ankara Attorney General stated that they were investigating the possibility of twin suicide bombings. It was observed that an anonymous Twitter account had claimed that an explosion could take place in Ankara just one day before the attack actually happened.

The lack of any immediate statement from any known non-state perpetrator taking responsibility for the attack resulted in speculation over the possible perpetrators. Nationalist Movement Party (MHP) leader Devlet Bahçeli stated that the attacks bore a resemblance to the explosion in Suruç in July, raising debate on whether the Islamic State of Iraq and the Levant (ISIL) could have been responsible. It was reported that the type of bomb used bore strong resemblance to the materials used in the Suruç bombing, signalling a potential connection between the two incidents.

The Peoples' Democratic Party (HDP) openly blamed the Turkish state and the government for conducting the attack, accusing the government of collaborating with non-state actors and taking insufficient action to tackle their presence. The HDP has claimed that the governing Justice and Development Party (AKP) was guilty of being "murderers with blood on their hands" and also of being the number one threat to Turkey's peace and security. The HDP's accusation was met with strong criticism by the AK Party government.

Veysel Eroğlu, the Minister of Forest and Water Management, made a heavily criticised statement in Afyonkarahisar implying that the HDP had purposely organised the attack against their own supporters to raise public sympathy for their party. Although Eroğlu did not name the HDP or the PKK specifically, he referred to the Diyarbakır HDP rally bombing in June as being an attempt to raise support for the HDP "just so that they can pass the 10% election threshold".

=== Investigations ===
Initially the government suggested the perpetrators could be any of the following anti-government groups: Islamic State of Iraq and the Levant|Islamic State/Daesh (IS), Kurdistan Workers' Party (PKK), Revolutionary People's Liberation Party–Front (DHKP-C), Marxist–Leninist Communist Party (MLKP)

A day after the bombing, Davutoğlu suggested that early investigations pointed to the involvement of IS. However, opposition political parties did not accept this attribution.

Yunus Emre Alagöz, an ethnic Kurd from Adıyaman and the younger brother of Abdurrahman Alagöz, the perpetrator of the Suruç bombing, was suspected by the government to be one of the suicide bombers. On 14 October media reports alleged that Yunus, and a second suspect, Ömer Deniz Dündar, both of whom are believed to have links to ISIL, were identified using DNA from the scene of the blast. On 19 October, one of the two suicide bombers was officially identified as Yunus Emre Alagöz.

=== Responsibility ===
In August 2018, a court sentenced nine defendants to life in prison for the bombing. 36 suspected members of ISIL were charged during the trial.

== Reactions ==
=== Domestic reactions ===
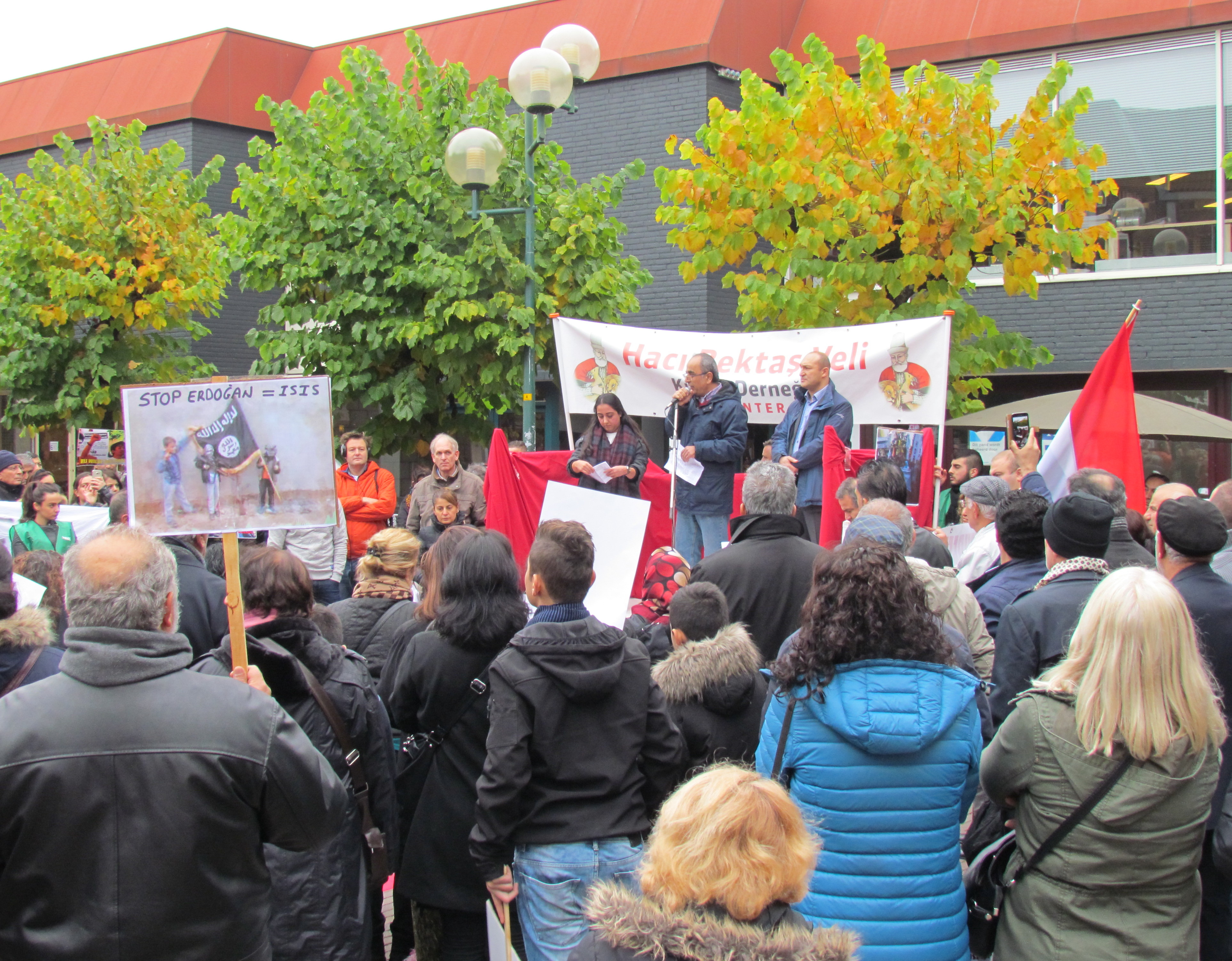
A protest by Turks living in the Netherlands

==== Political ====
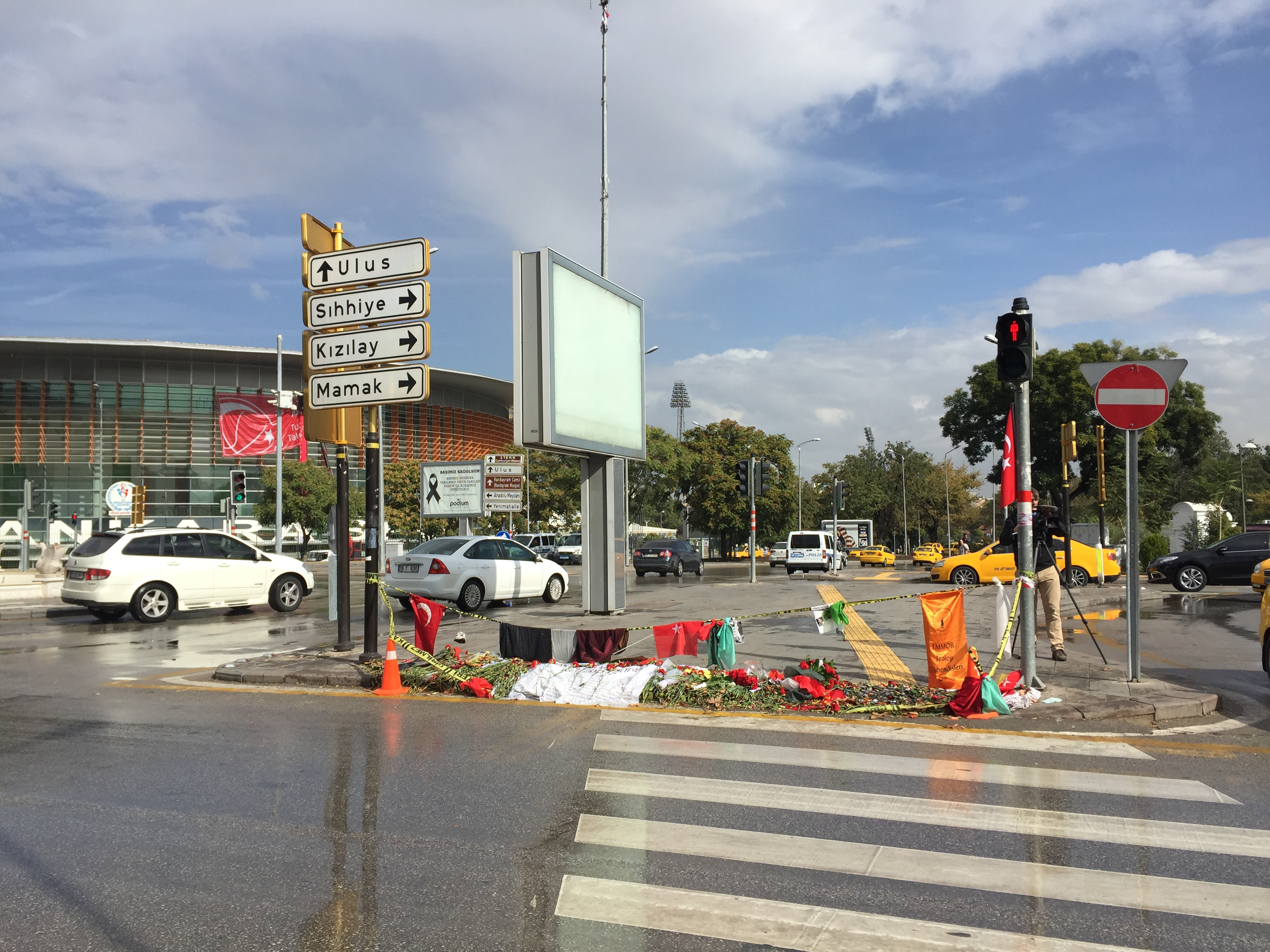
The site of the attack

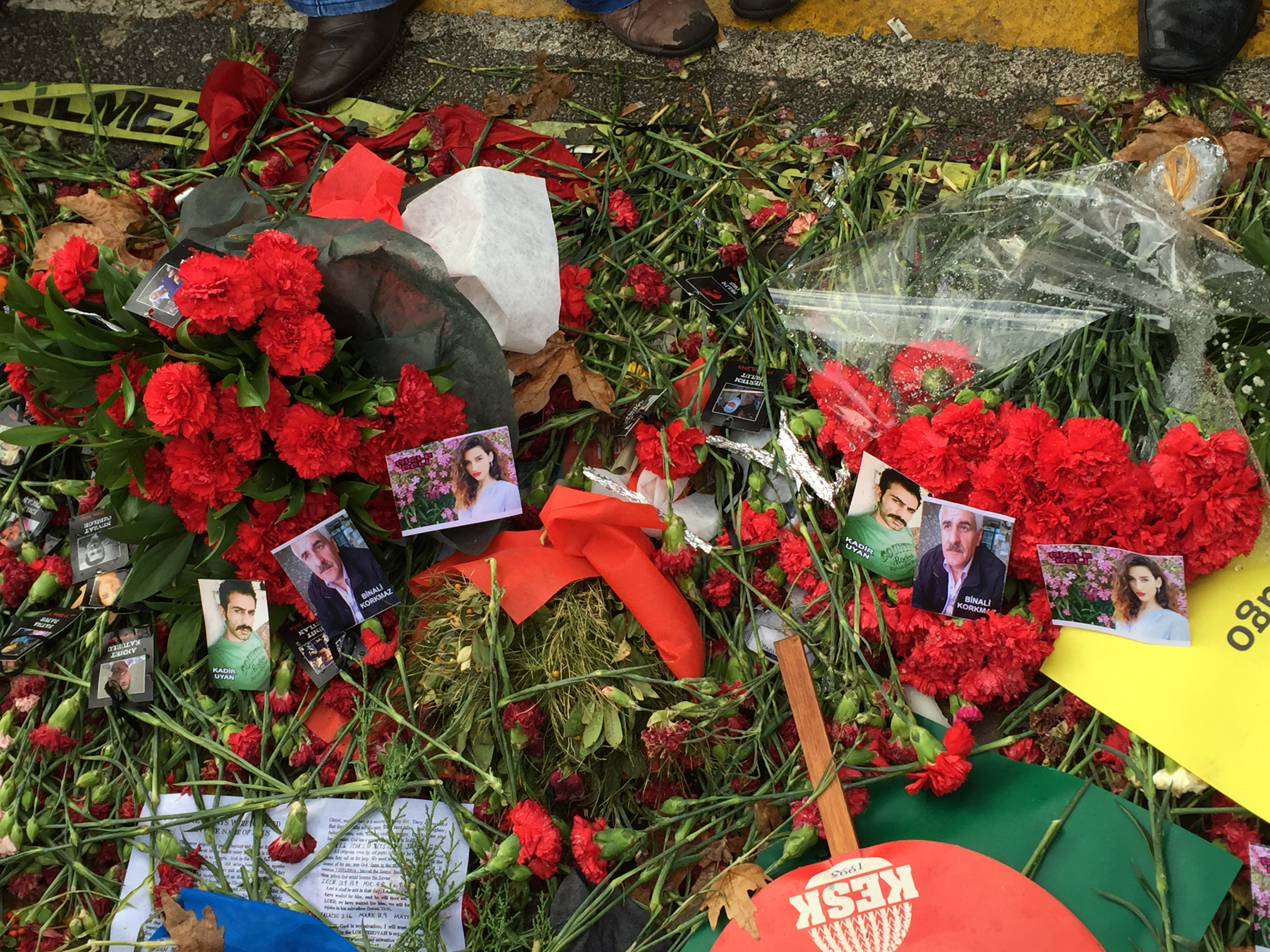
Flowers at the site

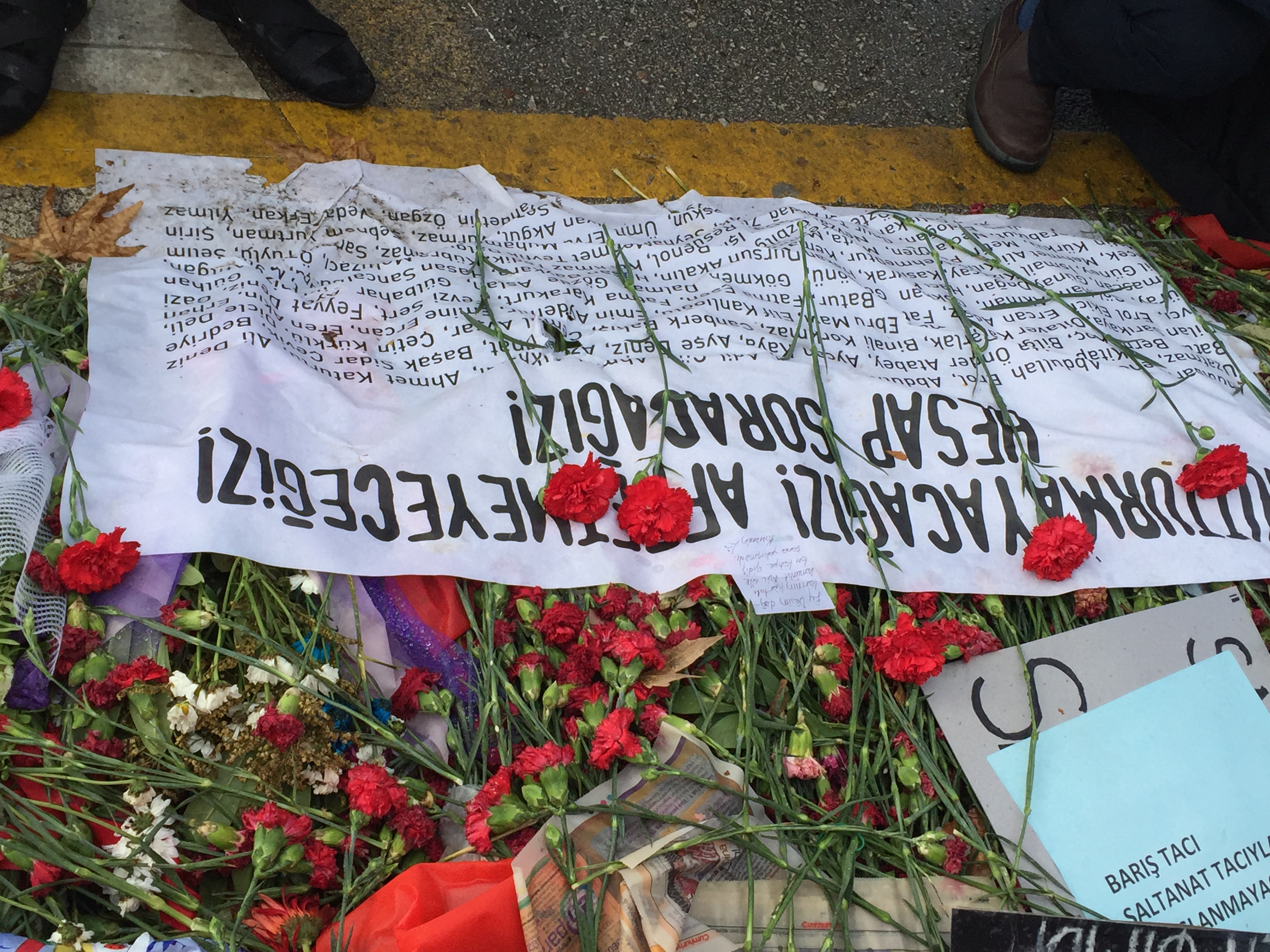
The victims' names

President Recep Tayyip Erdoğan condemned the bombings and vowed that the Turkish people will stand in "unity and solidarity" following the "heinous attack". He also stated that Turkey would not give in to efforts to sow division in society. He encouraged everyone to take responsibility and act with good intentions, claiming that the government was working to uncover the full details of the incident as quickly as possible.

Prime Minister Ahmet Davutoğlu, the leader of the Justice and Development Party (AK Party), issued a statement condemning the attack and claiming that it was an attack against democracy and against all segments of society. He said Turkey was an example of a country that had kept united despite several threats against national unity, announcing plans to meet with opposition party leaders in regards to the attack. Declaring three days of national mourning, Davutoğlu vowed to bring the perpetrators to justice regardless of who they were.

Main opposition leader Kemal Kılıçdaroğlu, the leader of the Republican People's Party (CHP), claimed that they were ready to fulfill any task to end such attacks in Turkey and agreed to meet with Davutoğlu to discuss the bombing. He stated that all political parties had a duty to stand together against such attacks and called on the perpetrators to identify themselves, further claiming that violence was never an answer to a difference in viewpoints.

Opposition leader Devlet Bahçeli, the leader of the Nationalist Movement Party (MHP), cancelled a planned electoral rally in İzmir following the attack and issued a statement in which he claimed that Turkey was paying the price for the AK Party's close relations with violent groups, refusing to meet with Davutoğlu. Condemning the bombings as an attack on the country's unity, he also stated that the fact that such perpetrators could evade security and intelligence organisations to conduct a bombing in the country's capital city was another serious issue of concern.

Opposition leader Selahattin Demirtaş, the co-leader of the Peoples' Democratic Party (HDP), drew parallels with the bombings in Suruç and Diyarbakır earlier in the year, claiming that his party was specifically targeted. Accusing the state of conducting a "massacre" in the centre of the capital Ankara, he further claimed that they were facing a "mad, undignified attitude that has lost its mind". He accused the AK Party government and Recep Tayyip Erdoğan of forcing violence onto the people of Turkey, denouncing them as "murderers with blood on their hands". Referring to Erdoğan as a "gang leader", he claimed that Erdoğan had been able to conduct rallies under complete security but members of the public wishing to hold a rally for peace had been "massacred". He further claimed that the AK Party was the biggest threat to the country's peace and security, drawing criticism from AK Party leader and Prime Minister Ahmet Davutoğlu.

Shortly after the bombing, PKK/KCK declared a ceasefire in order to ensure that a peaceful election would be held on 1 November, which was reportedly already being planned before the bombing took place.

==== Other ====
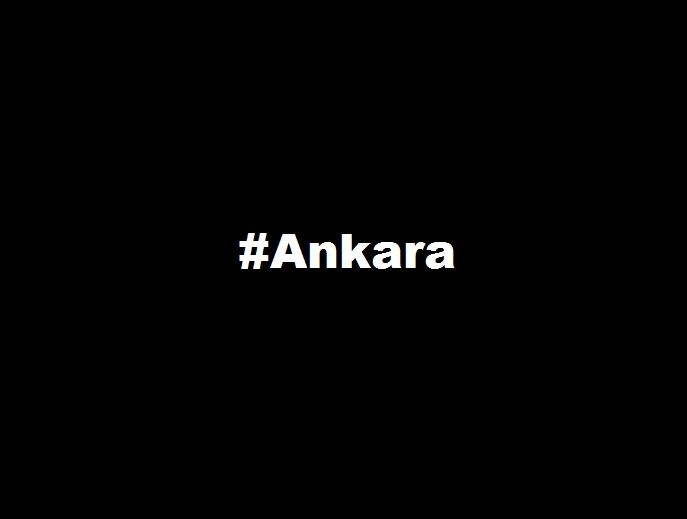
Attack shared by social media users post pictures

Before closing his morning television chat show on 13 October, TRT anchor Selver Gözüaçık read a tweet by one of his viewers that read it was not right to "lump all the victims together [because] some may be innocent." He agreed with the sentiment, saying that there may have been "police officers, cleaning staff, passersby or people trying to get to work" who were also killed in the bombings.

Former Nobel Prize in Literature laureate Orhan Pamuk criticized Erdoğan for what he said was a climate of insecurity as a result of the latter's persistence on trying to achieve a parliamentary majority that has brought the country to the brink of sectarian conflict.

During a one minute silence for the victims at the UEFA Euro 2016 qualifying match between Turkey and Iceland, the crowd instead booed, whistled, shouted Turkish ultranationalist slogans and chanted Allahu akbar.

=== International reactions ===
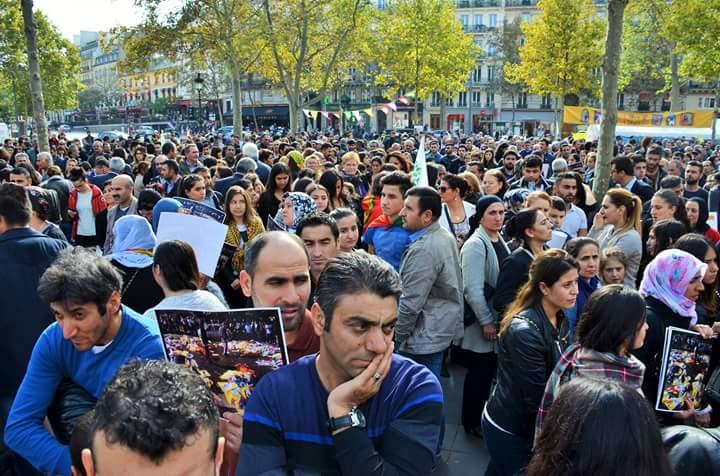
Protesters in Paris

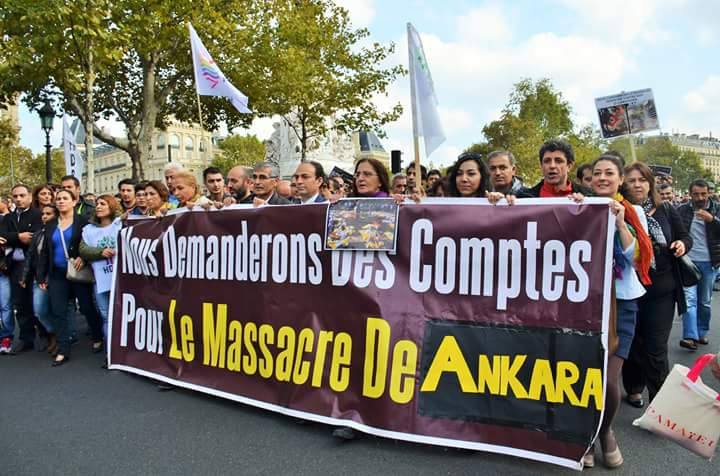
Banner at protest in Paris. Note that "Ankara" has been written over previous text, indicating the sign has been reused from a protest against a prior terrorist incident.

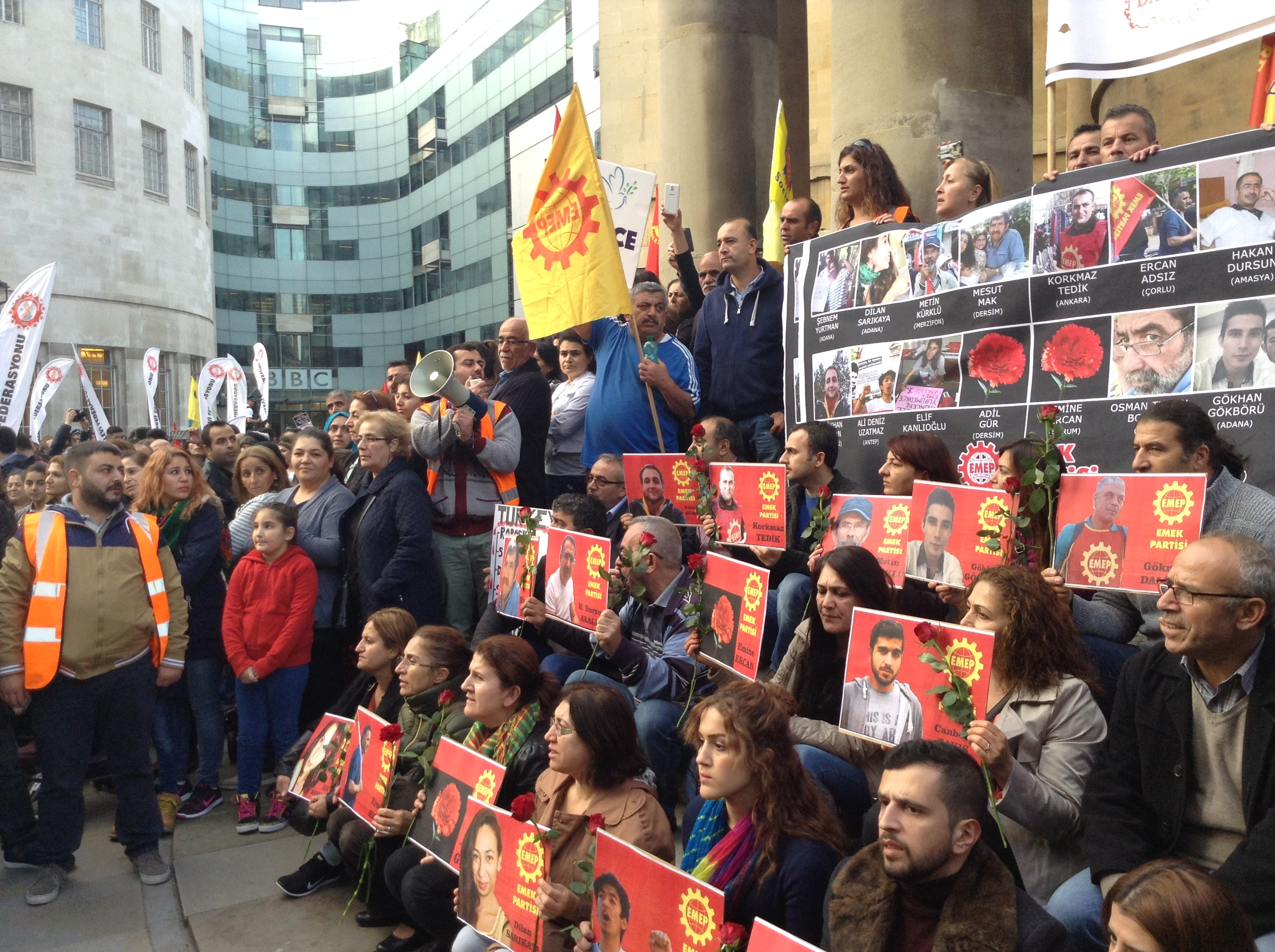
Supporters of the Turkish Labour Party (EMEP) protesting in London.

==== Supranational bodies ====
- European Union: President of the European Council Donald Tusk condemned the bombings noting that it "cynically exploits a sensitive moment for Turkey." High Representative for Foreign Affairs Federica Mogherini and European Commissioner for Enlargement and European Neighbourhood Policy Johannes Hahn issued a joint statement in which they urged Turkish society and all the political forces to unite against such incidents.

==== States ====
- Armenia: President Serzh Sargsyan expressed his condolences and condemned the bombings.
- Australia: Prime Minister Malcolm Turnbull expressed his condolences in a telephone call to his counterpart. Leader of the Opposition Bill Shorten conveyed his condolences to the Turkish Ambassador-designate.
- Azerbaijan: President Ilham Aliyev telephoned his counterpart, Erdogan, expressing his condolences to the family members and relatives of the victims and the Turkish people.
- China: Foreign Ministry spokesperson Hua Chunying "strongly condemned the bombings" and reaffirmed China's stance on the issue of terrorism, stating on behalf of the Chinese people that "we are against terrorist attacks in any form".
- Colombia: President Juan Manuel Santos condemned the acts. The Ministry of Foreign Affairs, on behalf of the Government, issued a statement condemning the attacks expressing that "Colombia condemns terrorist violence, deeply laments the occurrence of this acts against the individuals that manifest for peace".
- Cyprus: President Nicos Anastasiades expressed his shock and offered condolences over the attack. The Ministry of Foreign Affairs also issued a statement that condemned the attack and expressed concern over the spread of such incidents in the region and the need for a determination to combat such threats.
  - Northern Cyprus: President Mustafa Akıncı condemned the bombings, calling them a "brutal attack at a time when Turkey needed internal peace the most." Three days of national mourning were declared by Prime Minister Ömer Kalyoncu.
- Czech Republic: Prime Minister Bohuslav Sobotka condemned the attack and expressed his condolences to the Turkish government and people affected. He noted that the perpetrators must be brought to justice. Foreign Minister Lubomír Zaorálek also expressed condolences and said that these attacks must not disturb the upcoming election and put the democratic base of Turkey into jeopardy.
- Egypt: The Foreign Ministry issued a statement reading that it condemned the bombings and called for the international community to stand against such incidents.
- Finland: President Sauli Niinistö with spouse laid flowers to remember the victims at the attack site four days afterwards.
- France: President François Hollande condemned the attack and expressed condolences.
- Germany: Minister of Foreign Affairs Frank-Walter Steinmeier condemned the "brutal terror attack on peaceful demonstrators...[as an] attack on the democratic process in Turkey."
- Greece: Prime Minister Alexis Tsipras condemned the attack and called on Erdoğan to explain the numerous attacks on democratic rallies held in Turkey.
  - Opposition New Democracy and the Communist Party of Greece (KKE) also condemned the attack.
- Guatemala: President Alejandro Maldonado condemned the attack and expressed solidarity with the victims.
- Hungary: Prime Minister Viktor Orbán expressed his condolences in a letter to his counterpart that read "this terrible tragedy can not break our commitment to the [sic] international anti-terrorist cooperation."
- India: Prime Minister Narendra Modi wrote on Twitter of his sadness "by the loss of lives due to the bomb explosion" and also sent his condolences "to [the] families of [the] deceased & prayers with [the] injured."
- Iran: First Vice President Eshaq Jahangiri said both countries should closely cooperate and that there was a necessity to counter such perpetrators. "Given the critical and sensitive situation in the region and efforts by foreign powers to take advantage of the conditions, a rise in the exchange of views as well as extensive consultations between the two countries are of special significance." He further noted that Iran was interested in the highest possible level of cooperation with Turkey in different fields. In regards to the incident more specifically he expressed regret over the bombings and said that Iran was ready to render medical assistance to the victims.

Foreign Ministry Spokeswoman Marzieh Afkham expressed sorrow over the attack and offered sympathy to the families of the victims.

- Israel: President Reuven Rivlin sent a letter to his counterpart expressing condolences in which he wrote that he was "saddened to learn of the vicious attacks" and expressed "hopes for a better and more secure future for all the peoples of our region".
- Italy: President Sergio Mattarella condemned the attack and expressed the solidarity of the Italian people with the Turkish people.

Prime Minister Matteo Renzi expressed his dismay and grief "for the brutal terrorist attack against democracy and peace".

- Latvia: Minister of Foreign Affairs Edgars Rinkēvičs condemned the attacks and expressed his condolences to families of victims on Twitter.
- Lithuania: Both President Dalia Grybauskaitė and Prime Minister Algirdas Butkevičius expressed condolences, noting that the "entire international community unanimously condemn these terror attacks carried out against [the] Turkish people."
- Malaysia: Prime Minister Najib Razak said he was saddened by the loss of lives and strongly condemned the attacks.
- Nepal: A press release from Nepal's Ministry of Foreign Affairs stated that the Nepalese government "strongly condemns the suicide bombings in Ankara, the capital city of Turkey, on October 10, 2015 that caused the loss of so many precious lives and the huge damage of property".
- Pakistan: The Foreign Ministry issued a statement condemning the bombing and sent their condolences to the people and government of Turkey.
- Romania: President Klaus Iohannis condemned the attack and sent condolences to the Turkish people. He also reiterated Romania's "full commitment to fighting terrorism and extremism of any kind".
- Russia: President Vladimir Putin said: "It is necessary to unite efforts in the fight against this evil. What happened in Turkey... it certainly is an impudent terrorist attack, a terrorist crime with scores of victims. And of course it is an attempt to destabilize the situation in Turkey, a neighboring and friendly country for us."

Prime Minister Dmitry Medvedev expressed his "sympathy to all those who lost their loved ones" in the wake of the "outrageous act of terror". His office also condemned the attack and reported that he had "conveyed his condolences for the victims of the explosions in Ankara and wished [for a] rapid recovery to the injured."

- Ukraine: The Foreign Minister Pavlo Klimkin condemned the attack and wished for a speedy recovery to the wounded.
- United Kingdom: Secretary of State for Foreign and Commonwealth Affairs Philip Hammond condemned the "barbaric" attack and offered condolences to the family of those killed. He also stated that the British government was with the Turkish people.
  - Director of the counter-terrorism police unit, Assistant Commissioner Mark Rowley, said that the country's police are providing "ongoing support" to investigators in Turkey. He also called on anyone in Britain's "affected" communities with information to contact the police anti-terrorist hotline. He finally added that "we are deeply saddened to hear" of the bombings and offered condolences to Turkey and the Turkish community in the country.
- United States: President Barack Obama expressed his condolences to his counterpart Erdogan in a telephone call and "affirmed that the American people stand in solidarity with the people of Turkey in the fight against terrorism and shared security challenges in the region."

The embassy condemned the attack and expressed its condolences.

- Vietnam: The Foreign Ministry spokesperson Le Hai Binh "strongly condemns the terrorist attack" and expressed its condolences to the Turkish government and people and families of the victims.

==== Others ====
- Defend International: President Dr. Widad Akrawi deplored the bombings, extended her condolences and expressed solidarity with those who were rallying under the banners of peace and reconciliation, noting that the voices of peace cannot be silenced by explosions, brutality or barbarism. She also called for "an impartial investigation by UN inspectors into the suicide bombings and their aftermath."

==== Travel advisories ====
Austria, Belgium, Canada, Denmark, France, Germany, Iran, Ireland, Italy, the Netherlands, New Zealand, Poland, Switzerland, the United Kingdom and the United States issued travel advisories recommending that all non-essential travel to Turkey should be avoided.

== Aftermath ==
Following the attack, three days of national mourning were declared by Prime Minister Ahmet Davutoğlu.

=== Election campaigns ===
With the bombing occurring during the election campaigns for the November 2015 general election, various parties abandoned their scheduled rallies. The Justice and Development Party (AK Party) cancelled their planned election programme for three days after the attack. The Republican People's Party (CHP) also cancelled their daily programme, with party leader Kemal Kılıçdaroğlu having been due to spend the day campaigning in Istanbul. The Nationalist Movement Party (MHP) announced that their scheduled rally in İzmir would take place at a later date. The Peoples' Democratic Party (HDP), having claimed that they were the targets of the attack, abandoned a campaign strategy meeting due in their Istanbul headquarters. President Recep Tayyip Erdoğan also cancelled his prior engagements in Istanbul, including a trip to Turkmenistan.

=== Resignation calls ===
After a screen grab of Justice Minister Kenan İpek showing him smiling went viral, CHP leader Kemal Kılıçdaroğlu said that they should resign in a meeting with Davutoğlu. He said: "The sight of the justice minister [smiling at the reporter's question] is startling. The [sic] society is going through a severe trauma and meanwhile the justice minister is smiling. The justice minister cannot remain in his office." He added that Davutoğlu would make a decision upon receipt of a report on Ipek’s conduct. It was also criticised on social media. Further, Deputy Chairman Haluk Koç also called for the immediate resignation of Interior Minister Selami Altınok saying that he was unable to carry out his responsibilities.

=== Industrial action ===
The Confederation of Public Workers' Unions (KESK), Union of Chambers of Turkish Engineers and Architects (TMMOB), the Turkish Medical Association (TTB) and the Confederation of Progressive Trade Unions of Turkey (DISK), which had all been organisers of the peace rally, declared that two days of industrial action would be held on 12 and 13 October as a show of respect to the dead, as well as a protest against the "fascist massacre". The unions also stated that they would not give up on their efforts to end the conflict.

=== PKK ceasefire ===
Shortly after the bombings, the Kurdistan Workers' Party (PKK) declared a ceasefire to allow a peaceful election to take place on 1 November. The ceasefire announcement, which was made through the executive of the Group of Communities in Kurdistan (KCK), declared that the PKK would not conduct any attacks unless provoked or in self-defence. It is unclear if the ceasefire announcement, which was made approximately an hour after the Ankara bombings, was related to the incident.

=== Anti-government protests ===
In the afternoon following the attack, thousands of union members began protesting at Taksim Square in Istanbul against the bombing, with many participants chanting anti-government slogans and calling on both the governing AK Party and for Erdoğan to resign. Similar protests occurred in İzmir, with tensions between protestors and riot police briefly rising in Alsancak before deescalating shortly after. HDP Members of Parliament of the Grand National Assembly of Turkey led a protest in Batman, before being met by riot police using tear gas and water cannon. A group of 15 masked individuals in Kızılay, Ankara, began attacking police officers with fireworks before being met by water cannon and pepper spray. Over 2,000 protestors led demonstrations in Diyarbakır and 300 protestors participated in protests in Şanlıurfa, having been accompanied by HDP and Democratic Regions Party (DBP) politicians. Similar protests took place in Van, Tunceli and Kars, with participating politicians from the HDP and CHP as well as union members from KESK, TMMOB, TTB and DISK.

== See also ==
- 2016 Atatürk Airport attack
- March 2016 Ankara bombing
- February 2016 Ankara bombing
- 2003 Istanbul bombings
- List of terrorist incidents in 2015
