= Confederation of Turkish Trade Unions =

National trade union center in Turkey

TÜRK-İŞ
- Confederation of Turkish Trade Unions
- Türkiye İşçi Sendikaları Konfederasyonu
- Founded: 1952
- Headquarters: Ankara, Turkey
- Location: Turkey
- Members: 1,260,109 (July 2026)
- Key people: Ergün Atalay, president
- Affiliations: ITUC, ETUC, TUAC
- Website: www.turkis.org.tr

The Confederation of Turkish Trade Unions (Turkish: Türkiye İşçi Sendikaları Konfederasyonu), known as TÜRK-İŞ, is a national trade union centre in Turkey. It was established in Ankara on 31 July 1952. The oldest of the country's workers' confederations, it has been based historically on unions of public sector workers. In July 2026 its thirty-two affiliated unions had 1,260,109 members between them, 51.8 per cent of all union members in Turkey. It is affiliated to the International Trade Union Confederation and the European Trade Union Confederation, and is a member of the Trade Union Advisory Committee to the OECD.

At its fifth general assembly in 1964 the confederation wrote into its constitution a commitment to remain independent of the political parties. The formula, partilerüstü politika or above-party politics, gave TÜRK-İŞ its general political line. It was never uncontested within the confederation. Differences over industrial action, and over relations with the Workers' Party of Turkey, produced a breakaway in the middle of the 1960s: seventeen unions met in Istanbul in January 1967 and agreed to set up the rival Confederation of Revolutionary Trade Unions (DİSK), which held its founding congress the following month. More unions left for it in the early 1970s. TÜRK-İŞ set the principle aside at the general election of 1977, when it came out for the Republican People's Party, and the following year its president Halil Tunç signed a wage restraint agreement with the government of Bülent Ecevit.

The military government installed after the coup of September 1980 closed DİSK, HAK-İŞ and MİSK. TÜRK-İŞ was not shut down, although it too could not carry on trade union activity. Its general secretary Sadık Şide took office as minister of social security in the military government, and the International Confederation of Free Trade Unions suspended the confederation's membership in 1981. Unofficial action by public sector workers in 1989 led to a settlement that ended a decade of falling real wages. The confederation's headquarters had neither called for that action nor sanctioned it, but moved quickly to support it. Through the 1990s TÜRK-İŞ organised large demonstrations and, in the autumn of 1995, public sector strikes at workplaces employing some 300,000 people.

Under governments led by the Justice and Development Party from 2002 the confederation took a more conciliatory line towards the government than its rivals did. Workers facing reassignment after the decision to close the leaf tobacco plants of the state monopoly TEKEL camped outside its Ankara headquarters over the winter of 2009 and 2010, in the largest labour protest of the period. Its share of Turkey's union members then fell from 70.8 per cent in 2013 to 55.4 per cent in 2022 as HAK-İŞ grew. Ergün Atalay has been president since 2013.

== History ==
=== Foundation, 1946–1952 ===
Law no. 5018 of February 1947 allowed workers and employers to form unions and federations. Its fifth article barred unions from political activity, political propaganda and political publishing, and from acting as a vehicle for any political body. A breach could be punished by closure for three months to a year.

TÜRK-İŞ grew out of the unions founded after 1946 and the regional federations they formed. Yıldırım Koç calls it the outcome of a merger process already under way, and the first organisation in Turkey to cover almost every branch of industry nationally. A meeting at Bursa in April 1952 decided to create a confederation. Kemal Sülker proposed the name. The confederation was formally established in Ankara on 31 July 1952. Its founders also imposed a restriction on themselves: article 41 of the statute barred anyone holding office in TÜRK-İŞ from taking a post in a political party, or from using a union title for party, religious or commercial ends. Anyone who did so was treated as having resigned.

Koç rejects the account that TÜRK-İŞ was set up at American instigation. He points out that its first statute used the term "working class", that the United States did not then have the influence in Turkey to produce such an outcome, and that the American labour movement was itself split between the American Federation of Labor and the Congress of Industrial Organizations. Koç argues that the more important factor, and the less studied one, was direction by the Turkish state, particularly through the labour bureau of the Republican People's Party.

Ronnie Margulies and Ergin Yıldızoğlu take a different view. Writing in 1984, they call the confederation's credentials as an independent body dubious from the start. The International Confederation of Free Trade Unions and the American Federation of Labor supplied money, advisers and training, in an attempt they describe as building unions on the American model. The minister of labour attended the first TÜRK-İŞ meeting at İzmir. On their reading the confederation went on to play a fundamentally restraining part in workers' struggles through the 1960s and the 1970s.

Aziz Çelik places himself between the two accounts. American trade unionists took an interest in the founding, he writes, and tried to shape it. The Cold War explains why. A confederation in Turkey that leaned West mattered to both union and political calculations. Çelik argues the interest still cannot be read as an American operation. Doing so would set aside the internal union and political dynamics, which he treats as the decisive ones, together with the accumulated experience of Turkish workers. American influence did become marked later. He dates it to the 1960s, when the leadership moved into the orbit of American trade unionism.

A provisional executive committee ran the confederation until its first general assembly. Ömer Akçakanat chaired it, Şaban Yıldız was general secretary, Seyfi Demirsoy treasurer, Mehmet İnhanlı auditor and Adil Boğakaptan member. A biographical note in the DİSK history edited by Aziz Çelik, drawing on Kemal Sülker, records that Yıldız did the work of the committee and signed the founding declaration. Koç names Akçakanat as the confederation's first president and İsmail İnan as its second.

Çelik writes that Şaban Yıldız drafted the first statute. Yıldız was a socialist, later one of the founders of the Workers' Party of Turkey. Socialists and the principles of class unionism carried weight in the confederation's leadership from the founding until the İzmir congress, on Çelik's account, and were then cleared out of the top posts. Yıldız recalled a visit in May 1952 from Mükerrem Sarol, the Democrat Party's Istanbul provincial chairman, who offered 5,000 lira towards the cost of setting the confederation up. He wrote that he refused without hesitating.

The first general assembly met at İzmir on 6–7 September 1952. It elected İsmail İnan president, Muammer Özerkan general secretary and İsmail Aras treasurer, and resolved to join the International Confederation of Free Trade Unions, though the authorities later objected that the decision was defective. Affiliation was approved by a majority at an extraordinary second general assembly in Istanbul on 8–11 August 1953, which elected Naci Kurt president and İnan general secretary. Şaban Yıldız did not keep the general secretaryship at İzmir. The same note records that the right wing of the delegates withheld their votes from him because he was a progressive, and that Muammer Özerkan was put in his place after a hard contest.

=== The 1950s ===
Naci Kurt was elected a Democrat Party deputy in 1954 and gave up his union post. The executive chose not to replace him, and İnan carried out the president's duties in practice from 1954 to 1957. The third general assembly, held in Ankara on 19–21 June 1957, elected Nuri Beşer president. Beşer was a close friend of the prime minister, Adnan Menderes. Koç describes the leaders of TÜRK-İŞ and its affiliates in this period as seeking individual relations with the Democrat Party, and to a lesser extent the Republican People's Party, in the hope of influencing their policies and of being elected as deputies on their lists.

TÜRK-İŞ supported the military intervention of 27 May 1960 at once and without reservation. Its executive met in extraordinary session the next day, and members collected signatures to force Beşer out. He resigned on 3 June and was expelled from the confederation by its disciplinary board on 18 June.

=== Growth in the early 1960s ===
Writing in the International Labour Review in 1964, the Istanbul University economist Orhan Tuna observed that until TÜRK-İŞ was founded in 1952 Turkish unions had no central body to speak for them, although the need for one had long been felt. By the time of his survey its affiliates were ten federations, twenty-four industry-based unions and twenty-one directly affiliated unions, with 294,697 members between them, about three-quarters of all trade unionists in Turkey. Union membership nationally had risen from about 52,000 in 1948 to some 420,000 by 1963.

Tuna also recorded that governments had refused union requests to affiliate with international organisations until 1960, and that permission began to be granted from February 1961. The largest workers' demonstration Turkey had yet seen took place while that growth was under way. The coalition government's programme, read out on 27 November 1961, promised laws on collective bargaining and the right to strike. To hold it to that, the executive of the İstanbul İşçi Sendikaları Birliği, the city's union council and a TÜRK-İŞ affiliate, resolved on 1 December to hold a rally and told the confederation three days later. The military governor of Istanbul, General Refik Tulga, refused them Taksim Square, citing the Istanbul pogrom of September 1955 that had followed a meeting there, and offered a site outside the city. One union leader asked whether they would be fired on if they went ahead anyway. Yıldırım Koç records that the governor gave no answer.

TÜRK-İŞ backed the rally. A circular over the signatures of Seyfi Demirsoy and Halil Tunç complained that every party had put collective bargaining and the right to strike in its programme and competed over them at elections, and that nothing had changed in practice. About a hundred thousand people came to Saraçhane Square on 31 December 1961. İbrahim Denizcier read a resolution in three parts. He headed the tobacco, drink and food federation then, and became president of the confederation eighteen years later. The resolution asked for union freedom in full and at once, and for immediate recognition of the rights to strike and to bargain collectively. Its third part warned that if those rights were withheld the workers could not be held responsible for the strikes that followed. It carried by acclamation.

Who should be credited for Saraçhane is disputed. Koç insists the organiser was the Istanbul council and not the confederation, and counts TÜRK-İŞ's first significant mass action as a rally against communism held at Tandoğan Square in Ankara on 22 December 1962. Ali Rıza Buyukuslu writes instead that TÜRK-İŞ members organised the Saraçhane demonstration. Koç also doubts that the rally is properly called a success, because the trade union and collective bargaining laws that followed in 1963 cut into rights the 1961 constitution had already granted. Muzaffer Kaya sets out what the confederation did to get those laws passed. After Saraçhane its leaders lobbied ministers and deputies for a bill. On 8 April 1963 TÜRK-İŞ called union leaders to Ankara to go through the draft. The argument was about the lockout. Unionists belonging to the Workers' Party of Turkey wanted employers denied any matching right to shut a workplace. Seyfi Demirsoy, the confederation's president, answered that a strike right without one would make Turkish workers look ignorant of practice elsewhere. The assembly commission then altered the bill in line with TÜRK-İŞ's demands. The confederation put its proposals to every deputy, warned that workers would remember at the next election how each had behaved, and sat unionists through the debates. Law no. 275 passed the assembly in April and the senate in July. It appeared in the Official Gazette on 24 July 1963.

The confederation treated the result as a victory and named 24 July Workers' Day. Others read the same law differently. The Workers' Party and unionists close to it called it a retreat from article 47 of the 1961 constitution, because it restricted the use of the strike and allowed the lockout.

=== Above-party politics ===
At its fifth general assembly in 1964 TÜRK-İŞ resolved to remain independent of the political parties and wrote the commitment into its constitution. Article 3 provided that, unless a body made up of the confederation's executive and administrative boards together with one authorised representative from each affiliated union decided otherwise, TÜRK-İŞ would preserve its absolute independence from political parties and their associated organisations and would pursue an above-party policy. The formula, partilerüstü politika, gave the confederation its general political line, and its leaders continued to invoke it long afterwards. It was never uncontested. Koç records that unionists close to the Republican People's Party repeatedly pressed for it to be turned into support for that party, and that the question returned to successive general assemblies without the line being given up.

Brian Mello dates the move to late January and early February 1964 and reads it partly as a response to the Workers' Party of Turkey, whose support among the membership made some TÜRK-İŞ leaders uneasy. Halil Tunç, general secretary of the confederation and later its president, said he had not backed the party because workers needed union consciousness before political organisation; in those years, he recalled, one could find Justice Party unions and Republican People's Party unions. Mello adds a strategic reading. Staying nominally above party politics let TÜRK-İŞ make parties in government and in opposition compete for its support, and its leaders were alert to what good relations with the governing party could bring.

Yıldırım Koç, who worked for the confederation, gives a similar account. He describes above-party politics not as a withdrawal from politics but as part of an attempt to take a share of economic growth while avoiding open conflict with governments, at a time when conservative parties were themselves legislating in workers' favour and conceding improvements in public-sector collective agreements. Influenced by the practice of the AFL–CIO, TÜRK-İŞ began in 1964 and 1965 to monitor the conduct of individual deputies and to act as a pressure group. Koç also argues that the policy reflected the state of the membership. Workers were divided among the existing parties, many had obtained personal favours through them, and there was little sign that either a TÜRK-İŞ party or an endorsement of an existing one would be followed at the base.

Ali Rıza Buyukuslu describes the aim as having the labour movement act as a non-party pressure group, and notes that the policy sat easily with a trade union law that forbade organic links between unions and parties while leaving individual members free to join a party or stand for parliament. The principle was set aside at least once. Faced with a membership that had grown more radical during the 1970s, the tenth general assembly, held from 12 to 18 April 1976, declined to abandon party neutrality but authorised the administrative board to decide by a two-thirds majority whether to support a party at the next election; at the general election of 1977 TÜRK-İŞ came out in favour of the Republican People's Party.

=== The DİSK split, 1966–1967 ===
Relations between the TÜRK-İŞ leadership and unionists aligned with the Workers' Party of Turkey (TİP) held for six years after that party was founded, but were marked throughout by differences over organising and industrial action. Aziz Çelik identifies three developments that deepened the rift: the Kozlu miners' resistance of March 1965, the general election of October 1965, and the sixth TÜRK-İŞ general assembly in March 1966.

At Kozlu in Zonguldak on 10–12 March 1965, a dispute over the distribution of a merit bonus spread into a strike across the coalfield. Troops opened fire, two workers, Satılmış Tepe and Mehmet Çavdar, were killed, and about a hundred workers were arrested afterwards. The TÜRK-İŞ statement on the events attacked TİP, and the confederation's general secretary Halil Tunç accused Rıza Kuas — a member of the TÜRK-İŞ executive board, general secretary of TİP and president of the rubber workers' union Lastik-İş — of inciting workers against the army. Margulies and Yıldızoğlu add that Tunç called the strike illegal and the strikers communist provocateurs. At the sixth general assembly in March 1966 unionists aligned with the governing Justice Party took a majority of the leadership and Kuas was removed from it.

A breakaway was by then already being prepared. On 26 January 1966 the executive board of the metalworkers' union Maden-İş resolved in secret that, depending on the outcome of the March congress, it would if necessary lead the founding of what it called a genuine workers' confederation. In July 1966 four union leaders signed an inter-union solidarity agreement whose secretariat went on to run the founding preparations.

In November 1966 the TÜRK-İŞ honour board temporarily expelled five affiliates — Kristal-İş, Petrol-İş, Lastik-İş, Maden-İş and Basın-İş — over their part in the Paşabahçe glassworks strike. The strike's place in the split is disputed. Çelik, working from the founding documents, calls the connection exaggerated and treats the strike as one indirect factor among several. Brian Mello, by contrast, describes the TÜRK-İŞ leadership's condemnation of the strike as the point at which the split became complete.

Seventeen unions met in Istanbul in January 1967 and agreed to establish the Confederation of Revolutionary Trade Unions (DİSK); Çelik dates the meeting to 14 January and Yıldırım Koç to 15 January. Five founding unions were selected by ballot at a further meeting at the end of the month. The founding congress followed on 12 February 1967, although DİSK itself dates its foundation to 13 February. Four of the five founding presidents, among them Kemal Türkler, had been among the unionists who established TİP in 1961.

The TÜRK-İŞ first regional representative, İsmail Topkar, attended the founding congress but was refused the floor by delegates. He afterwards told the press that DİSK was not a professional body but had been set up by the TİP leader Mehmet Ali Aybar to gather votes for the party. The DİSK founding declaration gave fifteen reasons for the breakaway, among them that TÜRK-İŞ had failed to apply the principles in its own constitution, that it had opposed justified strikes, and that its reliance on American aid had compromised its independence.

=== The twenty-four principles, 1968 ===
The seventh general assembly, held in Ankara from 15 to 22 April 1968, adopted twenty-three principles setting out the confederation's programme. A twenty-fourth was added at the eighth assembly in 1970.

Several concerned the constitutional order. The first treated Turkey's economic and social problems as a single question and made rapid, balanced and fair development a condition of workers' welfare. The second undertook to press both governing and opposition parties to implement the social and economic rights set out in the constitution. The third made it a first duty to oppose any movement aimed at establishing an economic or social order outside the constitution, at changing the form of the state, or at damaging the Atatürk reforms and democracy.

The fifth stated the industrial outlook most plainly. It committed TÜRK-İŞ to a policy of removing the causes of class conflict and of securing balance, peace and cohesion between the classes.

Most of the rest were demands on the state across a wide field: a labour code for agricultural workers, extension of the Labour Act to all workers, unemployment insurance alongside an unchanged severance payment, land and agrarian reform, support for forest villagers, development of the poorer regions, tax and credit reform, producer cooperatives kept free of state interference and of middlemen, social housing, health coverage extended to the whole population, free vocational education for village children, and uniform pay across state enterprises. Two dealt with foreign capital, asking that it be kept out where domestic capital could do the work and that oil and mining be operated largely by the state. The twenty-fourth, added in 1970, committed the confederation to work for a national arms industry so that the country's defence would not depend on foreign aid.

=== The trade union law of 1970 ===
Buyukuslu writes that as the rivalry with DİSK sharpened, relations between TÜRK-İŞ and the Justice Party government improved a good deal. The government was ready to treat the confederation as labour's sole representative. TÜRK-İŞ held labour's place on the joint consultative boards and regulatory bodies: the minimum wage commission, the social insurance organisation, the supreme arbitration board and the state economic enterprises. In his account the government was moving away from the pluralism of the 1963 legislation towards a unitary labour policy that gave TÜRK-İŞ an effective monopoly of representation, and the amendment of the trade union law in 1970 was its first large intervention.

Koç writes that the wave of factory occupations between 1968 and 1970 alarmed TÜRK-İŞ as much as it alarmed every party in parliament. Two bills amending the Trade Unions Act and the collective agreements act were drawn up with the confederation's help. The aim, in his account, was to leave DİSK and its affiliates unable to work and then to do away with them.

Süreyya Algül, writing in a history of DİSK published by that confederation, follows the bills through parliament. A first proposal early in 1969 came from a Justice Party deputy who also led a TÜRK-İŞ affiliate. It lapsed in committee. After the general election of October 1969 five Republican People's Party deputies who were TÜRK-İŞ men covered much the same ground, among them Abdullah Baştürk of Genel-İş. Their text closely resembled one tabled by four Justice Party deputies of the same background. Algül also sets out what the confederation had itself asked for. The amendments printed in the TÜRK-İŞ journal in 1969 left out most of the provisions that later brought workers into the streets, though they did include a thirty per cent branch threshold, and the journal had asked as well for a limited right of general strike for the largest confederation.

The central provision required a union to represent at least a third of the insured workers in its branch before it could operate nationally, and a confederation to represent at least a third of the country's union members. Buyukuslu writes that this would have left TÜRK-İŞ the only body entitled to call itself a confederation. The eighth general assembly opened at Erzurum on 11 May 1970. Turgut Toker, a former minister of labour who chaired the assembly's labour committee, told the delegates that once the two laws were changed no confederation but TÜRK-İŞ would be left and DİSK would be wound up. They applauded him.

The National Assembly passed the bill in June 1970 by 230 votes to four, with the Workers' Party the only party against. On 15 and 16 June about a hundred thousand workers in Istanbul and Kocaeli left their factories and marched. Koç writes that members of TÜRK-İŞ affiliates, members of DİSK affiliates and workers in no union at all acted together for the first time, and that many of the marchers had voted for the two parties whose deputies had just carried the bill. The marches were peaceful to begin with. They turned into fighting once the security forces moved in, and martial law followed.

TÜRK-İŞ answered with a statement, printed later in its ninth general assembly report. The changes had been put to the nation and to the workers falsely, it said. Innocent workers who believed their bargaining and strike rights were being taken away had been driven into the streets by militants of the extreme left. What the bill did, on this account, was to give bargaining authority to strong unions rather than to yellow unions that held it without representing a majority. A trade unionist, it added, was not a fraud who sent workers into the street and then quit the field saying he had no part in it. Buyukuslu writes that Demirsoy and the executive board defended the changes and put the blame for the two days on DİSK.

The bill became Law No. 1317 on 29 July 1970, although its companion on collective agreements never reached the floor. Koç puts the cost at some 4,300 leading workers dismissed under martial law, their names and insurance numbers printed as a blacklist in the employers' confederation's journal. On an application by the Workers' Party the Constitutional Court struck down most of the changes in February 1972. It held that the threshold touched the substance of the right to form unions and would create a monopoly for the unions already working nationally.

A bomb was thrown at the confederation's Ankara headquarters on the night of 29 December 1970, and workers at TÜRK-İŞ workplaces stopped for two hours on 31 December in protest. Rumours went round the following spring that DİSK was to be closed. Halil Tunç wrote to prime minister Nihat Erim that TÜRK-İŞ had been in continual conflict with DİSK and that the two had opposing ideas and opposing aims, but that an attempt to close it would give the impression of a general move against union rights and union freedom.

=== The social democratic opposition, 1971–1975 ===
Opposition inside TÜRK-İŞ did not end with the departure of the unionists who founded DİSK. Those had been close to TİP; the next current came from unionists aligned with the Republican People's Party. Some affiliates had already objected to the confederation's above-party line at its seventh congress in 1968, but organised criticism dates from the beginning of 1971, when several member unions launched what they called the Social Democratic Movement. Its aim was to turn TÜRK-İŞ into a political force that addressed the problems of society as well as those of workers.

The first systematic move came on 14 January 1971, at a meeting of the TÜRK-İŞ executive board at Kızılcahamam. Four union presidents submitted a report titled Criticisms and Research on Common Paths of Reform, which became known as the Report of the Four. Its authors were Abdullah Baştürk of Genel-İş, F. Şakir Ögünç of Türk Deniz Ulaş-İş, Halit Mısırlıoğlu of Yol-İş and İsmail Topkar of Petrol-İş. The report argued for reformist unionism and political engagement, and against the above-party policy. It accused the confederation of failing in its task, of drifting into an oligarchy of union officials, and of becoming estranged from its own membership; it called the years 1967 to 1970 a period of betrayal of the cause. The board did not discuss the report fully, on the grounds of its length. The authors never published it themselves. DİSK printed and circulated it instead, and said that it confirmed the reasons DİSK had been founded.

Eight further unions then joined the group. On 9 July 1971 twelve unions and federations put a second report, A Social Democratic Order for the Turkish Labour Movement, to the executive board in Ankara; it is known as the Report of the Twelve. The signatories were Besin-İş, DYF-İş, Genel-İş, Ges-İş, Kristal-İş, Petrol-İş, Sağlık-İş, Tez Büro-İş, Türk Deniz Ulaş-İş, Türk Harb-İş, OLEYİS and Yol-İş. Discussion was again deferred, this time to a meeting on 11 November 1971, where the report was debated at length. Some members pressed for its rejection, which the president, Seyfi Demirsoy, prevented. At the same meeting the general secretary, Halil Tunç, tabled a motion of his own calling for political education directed at founding a party, and for TÜRK-İŞ officers to resign from existing parties. Seventeen of the twenty-eight board members and three of the four executive committee members signed it. It was never put to a vote.

Representatives of the unions behind the second report met at Sapanca on 4–5 September 1971 and formed a Council of Social Democratic Unionists, whose founding declaration Baştürk read out. The council organised regional education seminars but never became a rival confederation.

The social democrats made a final attempt at the ninth general assembly, held between 28 May and 5 June 1973, standing a separate slate. Mısırlıoğlu challenged Demirsoy for the presidency and lost by 186 votes to 70; none of their candidates was elected to the executive board. When Demirsoy died on 14 January 1974 the board made Tunç president and Sadık Şide general secretary.

Göktürk treats the 1973 assembly as a second exclusion comparable to that of 1966, and one that set off a further wave of departures. A group of unionists led by Fehmi Işıklar and Ali Kaya broke from the Metal-İş Federation on 27 December 1973 to found Çağdaş Metal-İş, which nine federation affiliates joined during 1974; Çağdaş Gıda-İş followed in June 1975. Neither prospered alone, and both went over to DİSK. She attributes the wider movement towards DİSK in these years to several causes: DİSK had proved durable where earlier breakaways from TÜRK-İŞ had not, the 1970 amendment of the trade union law made life difficult for independent unions, DİSK avoided a closure case after the military memorandum of March 1971, and the rise of Bülent Ecevit in the Republican People's Party drew social democratic unionists towards a confederation that had moved closer to that party.

=== The later 1970s, 1975–1980 ===
The one action of these years that was unlawful under the legislation then in force was a regional general strike in İzmir. Yıldırım Koç dates it to 15 June 1975 and describes it as beginning when the confederation's president, Halil Tunç, cut off the electricity supply, with affiliated unions supporting it in various ways. The confederation's own history gives the date as 16 June, says the stoppage began when Tunç threw the switch at an electricity distribution centre, and puts its length at eight hours and the number taking part at 80,000.

In 1978 the government of Bülent Ecevit tried to hold wage increases to cost-of-living indices under a policy it called the social contract. After long negotiations Ecevit won Tunç's support, and collective agreements in the public sector, where TÜRK-İŞ affiliates were strongest, were concluded on its terms. DİSK, better organised in private industry, met the proposal with suspicion and told the prime minister it would agree only if the government repealed the right of lock-out and nationalised a substantial part of the economy. The policy lapsed when power passed to the Justice Party in 1979. The agreement between Tunç and Ecevit was signed on 19 July 1978.

No common front with DİSK came out of the decade. Koç attributes this to the traditional TÜRK-İŞ line on one side and, on the other, to political relationships inside DİSK that were never openly settled at its general assemblies, and he adds that the inclination to co-operate was not strong among rank-and-file workers either. What co-operation there was took place between individual unions of similar political complexion. Hür Cam-İş of DİSK and Kristal-İş of TÜRK-İŞ signed a joint action protocol on 22 November 1979, and officials of Tez Büro-İş, of TÜRK-İŞ, and of the DİSK unions Sosyal-İş and Bank-Sen announced a joint co-ordination committee on 27 December 1979.

Strikes rose sharply after the stabilisation programme of 24 January 1980. Fewer than 6,500 workers were on strike on 25 January; by 27 June the number was above 57,000, and 131,000 workers had their strikes postponed during the first eight months of the year. Koç notes that official counts of working days lost in 1980 differ widely between ministries, from 1.3 million to 7.7 million. Taking the figures of the TÜBA labour bulletin, which he regards as more reliable than the official series, of the 84,432 workers who struck that year about 62,800 belonged to DİSK unions and 18,700 to TÜRK-İŞ unions, and of 7.7 million working days lost 6.4 million fell to DİSK affiliates and 1.0 million to those of TÜRK-İŞ.

=== The 1980 coup ===
Shortly after the military take-over of 12 September 1980 the National Security Council abolished the 1961 constitution and closed down three confederations, DİSK, HAK-İŞ and MİSK. TÜRK-İŞ was not shut down, although it too could not carry on trade union activity; DİSK was outlawed and its leaders imprisoned and prosecuted on charges carrying the death penalty. Ali Rıza Buyukuslu records the military's own reasoning as a belief that the leaders of TÜRK-İŞ unions had not been involved in terrorist activity, but treats that as an insufficient explanation and asks instead what role the confederation had played in the industrial relations system.

TÜRK-İŞ gave open support to the intervention, most visibly when its general secretary, Sadık Şide, took office as minister of social security in the military government. In November 1981 the International Confederation of Free Trade Unions suspended the confederation's membership. Affiliated unions raised little objection to their general secretary holding office simultaneously in the confederation and in the government. Orhan Balta, president of Tekgıda-İş and a former general secretary of TÜRK-İŞ, later explained that the confederation and its members had hoped that restrictions on unions would be lifted once democracy was restored, and had thought their general secretary could play a part in bringing that about. Selin Çağatay records that the confederation had reaffiliated with the ICFTU by May 1983.

Affiliated unions were not left untouched. Koç records that the first union a military court ordered liquidated was Ankara Yol-İş, an affiliate of TÜRK-İŞ. He dates the leadership's first response to the severity of the position to the drafting of the new constitution: the confederation held a large meeting in Ankara on 8 September 1982, and before the referendum of 7 November, at which criticism of the draft was forbidden, its president Şevket Yılmaz made a speech in favour of civilian rule that was widely read as support for the constitution and was criticised afterwards.

HAK-İŞ was allowed to resume activity in 1981, MİSK in 1984 and DİSK in 1991.

=== The protest cycle, 1987–1991 ===
Working days lost to strikes in Turkey per 1,000 insured workers, from 1984, when affiliated unions began using the heavily restricted right to strike, to 2017. The figures cover every legal strike in the country, not only those called by TÜRK-İŞ affiliates.

Affiliated unions began to use the heavily restricted right to strike in 1984. TÜRK-İŞ attempted a march to parliament on 24 March 1987, which the security forces stopped, and a rally it called in Mersin on 19 April was banned by the provincial governor; rallies followed at Samsun on 26 April and İzmit on 10 May, and during the year the confederation held meetings in thirty-three provinces for the lifting of the ban on politicians active before the coup.

Mustafa Görkem Doğan writes that TÜRK-İŞ, as the only remaining representative of organised labour after the coup, collaborated with the military administration in the expectation of benefiting from the elimination of its rivals, and that its leadership expected the restrictions on unions to be lifted once civilian rule returned.

From early 1987 strikes became more frequent around Istanbul, beginning at private metal and chemical plants with a history of militancy such as Netaş, Derby and Dora, which were organised by independent unions. The scale of the unrest became clear when Petrol-İş struck at sixty-three factories, involving some 20,000 workers. In 1988 the Kocaeli branch of Selüloz-İş led protests at the SEKA paper mill during a prolonged bargaining round.

Wages and conditions for 600,000 public-sector workers fell due for renegotiation in 1989, and talks deadlocked. Workers responded with unofficial actions in almost every province, among them lunch boycotts, mass reporting sick, go-slows, refusing to shave and marches before and after shifts; in Diyarbakır more than a thousand Yol-İş members filed for divorce. Doğan records that TÜRK-İŞ headquarters neither asked for nor sanctioned these actions, but then moved quickly to support them and to use them in the stalled negotiations; the April 1989 issue of the confederation's journal was, in his words, full of articles openly embracing the movements in the street, and its presidents' council demanded an immediate settlement. The March 1989 municipal elections were a defeat for Özal's governing ANAP and a victory for the Social Democratic Populist Party, which did particularly well in the largest industrial cities. The settlement that followed ended a decade of falling real wages.

Negotiations in the coalfield collapsed and 42,000 miners struck on the last day of November 1990. When buses carrying miners to Ankara were turned back, Şemsi Denizer, the chairman of the mineworkers' union GMİS, called on them to march on foot; they reached Devrek and then Mengen before being halted a few kilometres short of their destination, and the government offered to reopen negotiations on condition that the march ended. Doğan judges that TÜRK-İŞ headquarters refrained from organising protests in other cities while the miners marched and did not stand by GMİS, and that the resulting contract did not match the historical importance of the movement.

Koç records that the actions of these years worked through into the unions themselves. Between 1987 and 1990, 48 per cent of the branch presidents of TÜRK-İŞ affiliates were replaced, along with 15 of the 32 union presidents and 49 per cent of all executive committee members. From 1991, and particularly from 1993, action was directed centrally: in 1994 and 1995 almost all significant industrial action and demonstrations were settled by the confederation's presidents' board, an advisory body made up mainly of the presidents of affiliated unions, together with its executive board.

=== Mass action, 1991–2002 ===
On 3 January 1991 TÜRK-İŞ told members in every branch of industry to stay away from work. Koç calls it the first decision of its kind in the confederation's history and says it was largely carried out. Between 4 and 8 January about 50,000 miners and their families walked from Zonguldak to Mengen on a decision of the affiliated Genel Maden-İş, backed by other mass organisations and by several political parties.

In the summer of 1991 the employer at the Paşabahçe glassworks moved to dismiss 2,278 workers. Members of the TÜRK-İŞ affiliate Kristal-İş stopped production on 26 July and occupied the plant, and the families of about 3,000 workers gathered outside. The occupation lasted 21 days and ended in the workers' favour.

From 1993 the confederation held mass demonstrations more often. It marked May Day for the first time that year, at Abide-i Hürriyet Square in Istanbul, and on 24 April 1994 held its first Ankara rally since 1969. A general stoppage at the workplace followed on 20 July 1994. On 26 November, after the government proposed to remove important workers' rights from the 1995 budget bill, more than 100,000 people gathered at Tandoğan, passed through Anıtkabir and walked to within a few hundred metres of Parliament. Koç writes that the bill was amended as a result.

About 300,000 people joined the Emeğe Saygı march on 5 August 1995 and went on to Kızılay, although that route had not been authorised. Between 20 September and 27 October the confederation ran public sector strikes at workplaces employing some 300,000, the largest in Turkish history by both the number of workers involved and the working days lost. On 15 October, with the strikes still running, TÜRK-İŞ held an unauthorised rally in Kızılay Square. About 100,000 people came through the police barricades to reach it, and Koç says their presence helped bring down Tansu Çiller's minority government in a confidence vote.

Koç does not present those strikes as a success. Some TÜRK-İŞ affiliates did not meet their responsibility to support the strikes, no concrete backing came from the other confederations, and some unions did not act on decisions to defy strike postponement orders. Another ten or fifteen days, he writes, could have brought serious disintegration. Against that he sets the fact that many of the strikers were striking for the first time in working lives of more than twenty years: they did not win, but they were not defeated either.

Two joint bodies came out of the decade. The Common Voice of Working People Democracy Platform organised the May Day celebrations of 1994 and 1995 and joined the general action of 20 July 1994, then faded during 1995, weakened by shortcomings in the way it had been set up and by friction with HAK-İŞ over privatisation.

The Labour Platform followed on 14 July 1999. TÜRK-İŞ, DİSK, HAK-İŞ, KESK, Türkiye Kamu-Sen and Memur-Sen founded it together with nine other bodies, among them three pensioners' associations and the professional organisations of engineers, doctors, dentists, pharmacists, veterinarians and accountants. It held a rally at Kızılay on 24 July 1999 that drew about 400,000 people, and produced an alternative economic programme in March 2001 which it updated in September 2002. From the summer of 2001 it lost the enthusiasm it had started with, which Koç puts down to the differences between its member organisations. Koç sat on the technical committees of both platforms as the TÜRK-İŞ representative.

In a later history Koç credits the confederation with a hand in three changes of government during these years. It worked on the Republican People's Party to leave the coalition on 20 September 1995, the day the public sector strikes began. The demonstration at Kızılay on 15 October, and the stand taken there, stopped Tansu Çiller's minority government winning its vote of confidence. In 1997 the Group of Five, in which TÜRK-İŞ took part, counted in the resignation of the Refahyol government.

The question of a party of its own came back repeatedly and was never settled. The general assembly of December 1992 resolved that a unionism confined to collective bargaining could not meet the new attack and that the movement's independent political strength had to be built up. At the confederation's May Day rally in Istanbul in 1993 Bayram Meral said that if the existing parties went on ignoring the working class it would found a party of its own. Before the local elections of March 1994 TÜRK-İŞ distributed a pamphlet calling on members to hold the parties to account, and in May 1995 it put its demands to every party and asked each where it stood. Three replied.

In December 1995 the presidents' council called for no votes to be cast for the True Path Party or the Republican People's Party, and a year later it declared that TÜRK-İŞ should fill the political vacuum and press on with founding a party. Koç writes that neither the confederation nor its affiliates did anything to carry those decisions out, that members did not take its position into account when they voted, and that the resolutions stayed on paper. After the general assembly of 1999 the discussion largely stopped.

=== New labour laws and the TEKEL protest, 2002–2013 ===
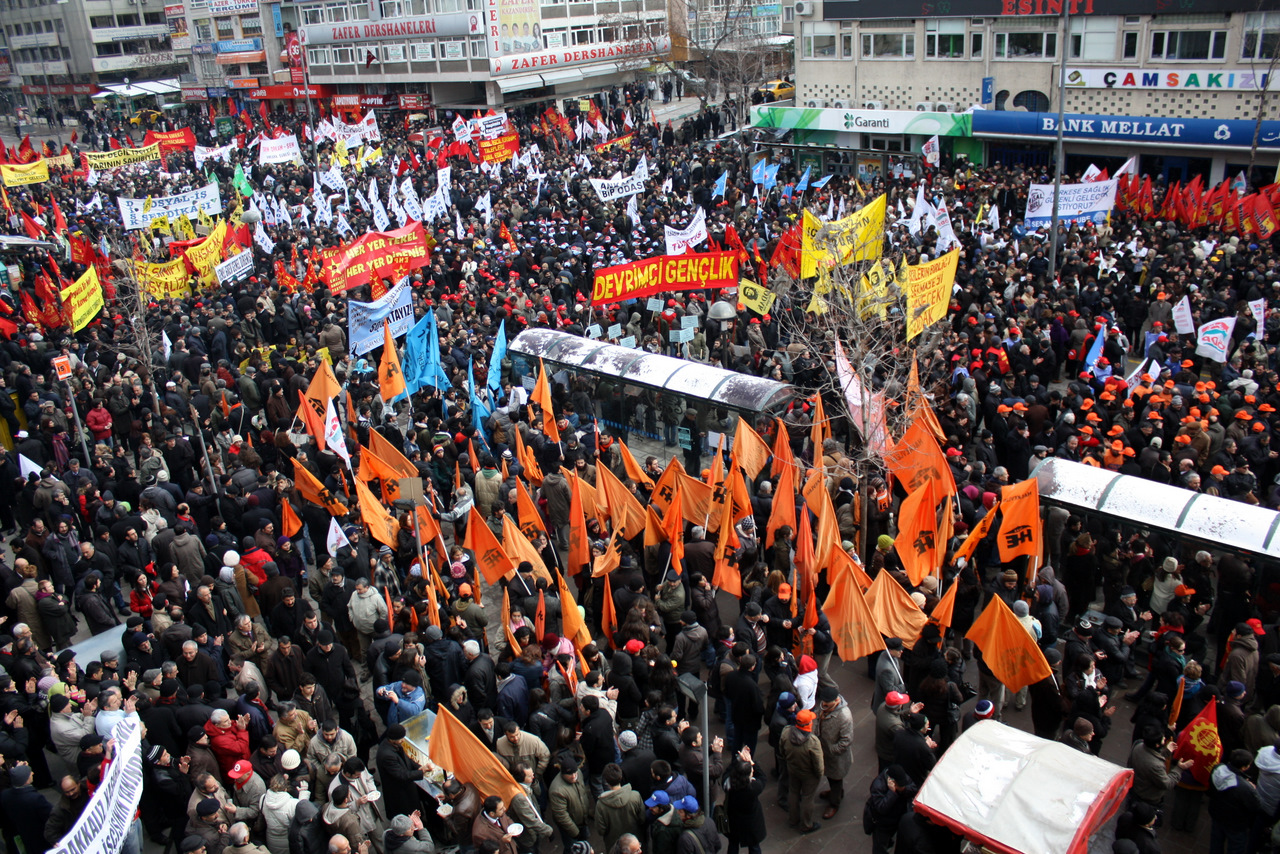
Demonstration in Ankara in support of the TEKEL workers on 4 February 2010, the day the worker and public servant confederations stopped work across the country

Demet Şahende Dinler describes the TÜRK-İŞ leadership as more conciliatory towards governments than those of the other confederations. It did not strongly oppose the labour law of 2003, which altered working conditions considerably and gave legal form to practices employers had until then used informally.

The presidents' council was not always quick to act. When workers occupied the SEKA paper mill at İzmit in 2005 against its closure, it waited forty-two days before backing them, meeting at İzmit on 1 March and calling on affiliates to stay in their workplaces on 4 March. Attempts to privatise the TEKEL factories had been resisted through the 1990s and 2000s, at the Malatya and Adana cigarette works in particular, and Tekgıda-İş held rallies against privatisation at Malatya on 13 February 2005 and Tokat on 27 February; Koç writes that none of them carried as far as the resistance that followed.

The largest labour protest of the period grew out of a decision to close TEKEL's leaf tobacco plants. Workers who refused the temporary public employment status known as 4-C, which paid less and carried neither the usual entitlements nor the right to organise, travelled to Ankara on 15 December 2009 and asked to be placed in public bodies on their existing terms. They were not allowed to spend the night outside the governing party's headquarters. Moved on first to an indoor sports hall and then to Abdi İpekçi Park, and cleared from there by police, they ended up outside the TÜRK-İŞ head office, at first only during the day. From 15 January 2010 they slept there in tents.

The TÜRK-İŞ presidents' council backed them. From 25 December, for four weeks, affiliates arrived late for work each Friday and held mass press conferences outside the governing party's offices, and branch officers gathered at Güvenpark in Ankara on 28 December to put the case to the leaders of the parties represented in parliament. A rally followed at Sıhhiye on 17 January 2010. On 4 February the worker and public servant confederations together exercised the right not to work for a full day across the country, and sit-ins and torchlight marches went on in the provinces through the second half of the month. The protest ended on 2 March 2010.

Against the general weakening of the movement in these years, Dinler describes the protest as the one development that ran the other way. What began as a local dispute drew in political parties, social movements, non-governmental organisations and unions, but left no lasting radicalisation behind it.

Koç gives a more critical account. He writes that the encampment's position beside the head office gave the workers real protection, and that it was among the reasons no police raid ever broke it up, but that TÜRK-İŞ was uncomfortable with the protest and, faced with the breadth of public support, did the minimum needed to save the situation. The presidents' council's decisions on the Friday stoppages and the visits to the governing party's provincial offices were not pressed home: most affiliated unions took no effective part, no internal discipline followed, and no sanction was raised against those that ignored them. The rally of 17 January and the stoppage of 4 February he describes as decisions the leadership was obliged to take.

He counts the outcome a success all the same. The campaign kept a number of unions above the ten per cent threshold, stopped a bill on labour broking reaching parliament, delayed the privatisation of sugar and energy undertakings, and brought improvements in the rights and conditions of workers employed under article 4-C. At a time when allegations of corruption had damaged the standing of union officials, it restored some of their public credit.

Two joint actions followed. On 1 May 2010 Taksim Square in Istanbul was opened for the celebration for the first time in 32 years. The confederation's own history attributes that to a call it made to HAK-İŞ, DİSK, MEMUR-SEN and KESK. On 26 May the four confederations carried out a general action agreed in February, in which a common declaration was read out in workplaces between one and two in the afternoon.

TÜRK-İŞ had limited success in 2011 in getting three amendments on labour relations reversed before new legislation was drafted. In the same period a platform of ten of its affiliated unions took up the more critical line towards the government that had until then been associated with DİSK and KESK.

The new legislation arrived in 2012 as Law No. 6356 on Trade Unions and Collective Labour Agreements. Alpkan Birelma writes that it brought unions little. Among its few gains were a simpler joining procedure and a reliable membership register, notarisation having been replaced by an online system. The law was not agreed among the social partners. DİSK and several TÜRK-İŞ affiliates opposed articles of it, and much of the older restriction on collective bargaining and industrial action survived.

=== Since 2013 ===
The confederation's position among Turkish unions weakened after 2013. Its share of union workers fell from 70.8 per cent to 55.4 per cent between January 2013 and January 2022, while HAK-İŞ roughly doubled its own share, from 16.6 to 33.2 per cent, and DİSK stayed where it was, moving from 10 to 9.7 per cent. In absolute numbers TÜRK-İŞ still had 1,213,439 members in January 2022, against 727,187 for HAK-İŞ and 212,593 for DİSK, and it recovered about 3.6 points of share after 2019.

Much of the movement in these figures came from one change. In 2018 the government moved nearly 750,000 workers employed through subcontractors in the public sector onto public payrolls. Alpkan Birelma describes that reversal as forced on the government by workers and unions applying cumulative pressure, and notes that the three worker confederations competed rather than co-operated over it. Affiliates that organised those workers grew quickly. Membership of the TÜRK-İŞ union Koop-İş rose from 71,594 in July 2020 to 104,308 in January 2021.

Türk Metal is the largest affiliate, with 19 per cent of the confederation's membership and nearly 75,000 members added since 2013. It has also drawn the sharpest criticism. Theo Nichols and Nadir Sugur, whose fieldwork Birelma cites, put Türk Metal at the top of any ranking of unions that matter in the modern sector, and at the same time find that it embodies the worst aspects of the corporatist practice of the early republic. They describe its authoritarianism towards its own members, and cases in which members who tried to leave were blocked by co-operation between the union and employers.

That relationship broke open in 2015. About 20,000 Türk Metal members in nearly twenty factories walked out in wildcat strikes against their own union and the collective agreement it had signed. Birelma writes that the revolt produced a moderate shift: Türk Metal staged more protests as it organised new workplaces from 2017, and in 2019 settled its rivalry with Birleşik Metal-İş through an agreement encouraged by IndustriALL, under which either union would withdraw from a contested workplace after a referendum. He writes that the change may be superficial at best.

The legal environment tightened over the same years. By 2022 the government had prohibited 227 lawful strikes since 2015, covering some 170,000 workers, and the International Trade Union Confederation had counted Turkey among the ten worst countries in the world for unions since 2016.

Aziz Çelik counts 193,082 workers whose strikes were postponed under Justice and Development Party governments between 2003 and 2019. Most were stopped on national security grounds. The largest single case reached across all three confederations. A postponement in 2018, under the state of emergency, covered the metal industry group agreement and about 130,000 workers. Türk Metal, TÜRK-İŞ's largest affiliate, was one of the three unions involved. The others were Birleşik Metal-İş of DİSK and Çelik-İş of HAK-İŞ. Another postponement in 2019 stopped Demiryol-İş, also a TÜRK-İŞ affiliate, from striking on the İzban commuter railway at İzmir. The ground given was disruption to urban public transport.

One joint campaign succeeded. During the pandemic the government put a bill to parliament that would have removed the right to severance pay for workers under 25 and over 50. DİSK and TÜRK-İŞ organised street protests, HAK-İŞ joined them at a press conference against the bill, and the amendment was withdrawn. Birelma calls it a significant success, although one won on the defensive.

== Relationship with the state ==
Yıldırım Koç, in a survey written in English and published by TÜRK-İŞ itself in 1999, argues that the decisive influence on the confederation has been the Turkish state rather than any particular government. TÜRK-İŞ has opposed the policies of governments from time to time and has defied their authority, he writes, but it has never departed from general state policy and has never challenged the state.

He rejects two external explanations for that outlook. The first contacts in Turkey by people he calls alleged CIA agents working under cover as trade unionists took place in 1951; against what he describes as exaggerated allegations, he holds that their activity had only a minor effect on the labour movement in general and on TÜRK-İŞ in particular. The second is the AFL–CIO. Those features of Turkish trade unionism that resemble American business unionism follow, in his account, from the character of the working class in Turkey and from the conduct of employers and of the state, and treating the AFL–CIO as a determining influence would be misleading. Aziz Çelik reads the relationship differently, and from outside the confederation. He argues that Turkish trade unionism since the 2000s has been shaped by symbiotic relations between the government and the unions closest to it. Collective labour relations have taken on authoritarian corporatist features. The government uses that method to set wage policy and the basic terms of working life. A restricted bargaining regime and the banning and postponement of strikes form another of its supports. Union density did rise through the 2010s. The growth was sharply asymmetric, though, and Çelik reads that asymmetry as a consequence of the symbiotic relations that deepened after 2000. His conclusion is that pluralism exists on paper while what operates in practice is a most favoured union.

== Organisation ==
TÜRK-İŞ has four statutory organs: the general congress, the executive board, the board of auditors and the disciplinary committee. The council of union presidents sits alongside them, described in the constitution as the confederation's other principal organ.

The general congress meets every four years at the confederation's headquarters. Affiliated unions send delegates in proportion to the members on whom they have paid their dues, on a scale set out in the constitution. Every affiliate is entitled to at least one delegate whatever its size. Membership above 110,000 is left out of the calculation. That caps the weight of the largest unions. The congress amends the constitution, elects the members of the three elected boards, approves the budget, sets affiliation fees and decides whether the confederation joins or leaves an international organisation.

The executive board is the confederation's highest decision-making and executive organ between congresses. It has five full members chosen by secret ballot from among the delegates: the president, the general secretary, the general financial secretary, the secretary of education and the secretary of organising. Five untitled substitutes are elected with them, and the highest-polling substitute is called up when a seat falls vacant.

The board of auditors has five members and must examine the confederation's work at its headquarters at least every six months. The disciplinary committee also has five. It meets when the executive board refers a case, takes the written defence of whoever is accused, and may issue a warning, a reprimand or a temporary suspension from office. A suspension runs no longer than the next ordinary congress.

The council of union presidents brings together the presidents of every affiliate. A union whose president already sits on the TÜRK-İŞ executive sends its deputy instead. A union with more than 50,000 members may send a second board member. The council meets quarterly, or when a majority of its members ask for it. It approves the confederation's internal regulations and gives the executive its views on education, organising and finance.

Writing in 1994, Ali Rıza Buyukuslu set out the structure then in force under the Trade Unions Act of 1983. The congress met every three years rather than four, and the board of auditors had three members rather than five. Yıldırım Koç records that in 1994 and 1995 almost all significant industrial action and demonstrations were settled by the council of presidents together with the executive board.

== Women workers ==
Two women from TÜRK-İŞ, Meral Sonbay and Mevhibe Öksüzcü, attended the ICFTU summer school for women workers at La Brévière in France in 1953. Selin Çağatay argues that what was decided there shaped the confederation's understanding of women as a distinct category of workers.

Concrete steps waited until the 1960s. In 1963 Marcelle Dehareng, secretary of the ICFTU women's committee, lectured at a seminar for women trade unionists in İzmir run by TÜRK-İŞ and the OECD. TÜRK-İŞ sent an observer to the committee's meeting in May 1964, and its education board then made women workers' education one of the five principles of its programme for 1965, planning seminars to produce women representatives and organisers in the tobacco, distillery, textile and war industries. Late in 1964 the confederation told the ICFTU it wanted a women's committee of its own and asked for advice. Sixteen years passed before one was set up.

The link in the meantime ran through one member of staff. Gül Neşe Kutlu, later Erel, joined TÜRK-İŞ as a research expert in 1963 and became head of its research department. She had no formal responsibility for education, but acted as an informal gender officer because she was a woman and spoke English, and Seyfi Demirsoy nominated her as a corresponding member of the ICFTU women's committee in 1966. Çağatay writes that the connection faded in the turmoil that followed the DİSK split. The last year Erel appeared on the committee's list was 1972.

The International Women's Year of 1975 changed the register. By the middle of the decade TÜRK-İŞ leaders were treating women's low participation in unions as a problem, although Çağatay notes that their advice to women took the double shift for granted and treated union work as a third. In April 1979 the executive resolved on firmer steps, and that July seventy women labour activists, most of them workplace representatives, met for four days at Çeşme near İzmir at a seminar run with the ICFTU. Working in small groups without an educator present, a method taken from an ICFTU report of 1977, they produced a set of demands: union education written into collective agreements, shorter weekly hours, twelve weeks of maternity leave without loss of pay, equal pay, instruction in family planning, childcare at workplaces and in working-class districts, and a women's bureau in TÜRK-İŞ.

The bureau was agreed in December 1980, and the money for it came from the United States rather than the ICFTU. President İbrahim Denizcier asked George Meany of the AFL–CIO for funding, and Meany asked the labour organiser Maida Springer-Kemp to help set it up. Springer-Kemp and the confederation's education secretary interviewed the candidates, and Leyla Tuncer of the health workers' union Sağlık-İş became the first director of the TÜRK-İŞ Women Workers' Bureau. The Asian-American Free Labor Institute, an AFL-CIO body, funded it until 1992.

Under Rahime Akdoğan, who had helped write the Çeşme report, the bureau ran seminars across the country on trade unionism and labour rights alongside family planning, nutrition and health, drawing in feminist academics including Şirin Tekeli and Çiğdem Kağıtçıbaşı. Writing in the confederation's journal in 1981, Akdoğan asked why there were only men in union administrations. Union business was rarely conducted on the shop floor and usually happened outside working hours, she answered, while husbands and male relatives discouraged women from taking part.

On 20 and 21 March 1989 the bureau brought three hundred women from member unions to Istanbul for the First Congress of Working Women, the first national gathering of trade union women in Turkey. Its declaration set out unequal pay, long hours and the absence of social security and childcare, and called on the state and employers to apply ILO conventions. Delegates asked that affiliated unions form women's commissions of their own. Akdoğan left the bureau after the congress, having been refused the floor by the confederation's new education secretary.

TÜRK-İŞ applied to the ICFTU that year for money to set those commissions up and ran the project with ICFTU funding into the middle of the 1990s. None existed by the end of 1992. Ten affiliated unions had established them by 1996, under the bureau's director Seyhan Erdoğdu.

Women labour activists later remembered these years as the confederation's dark period under American influence. Çağatay argues that the institute's reputation as an instrument of United States foreign policy has overshadowed the work of the local activists who shaped the confederation's gender politics.

== Presidents ==
TÜRK-İŞ elects its president at an ordinary general assembly. The confederation's constitution now sets the interval at four years. When a president has left office between assemblies the executive board has filled the post from among its own members.

Presidents of TÜRK-İŞ
President	Term	Elected
Ömer Akçakanat	1952	Chaired the provisional executive committee formed when the confederation was founded on 31 July 1952
İsmail İnan	1952–1953	First general assembly, İzmir, 6–7 September 1952
Naci Kurt	1953–1954	Second (extraordinary) general assembly, Istanbul, 8–11 August 1953; gave up the post in 1954 on being elected a Democrat Party deputy
İsmail İnan acting	1954–1957	No new president was elected; İnan carried out the duties as general secretary
Nuri Beşer	1957–1960	Third general assembly, Ankara, 19–21 June 1957; resigned on 3 June 1960, a week after the military intervention of 27 May
Seyfi Demirsoy	1960–1974	Fourth general assembly, Ankara, 19–21 November 1960; re-elected in 1964, 1966, 1968, 1970 and 1973; died in office on 14 January 1974
Halil Tunç	1974–1979	Brought in by the executive board on Demirsoy's death; re-elected at the tenth general assembly, Ankara, 12–18 April 1976
İbrahim Denizcier	1979–1982	Eleventh general assembly, Ankara, 16–22 April 1979
Şevket Yılmaz	1982–1992	Twelfth general assembly, Ankara, 24–28 May 1982; re-elected in 1983, 1986 and 1989
Bayram Meral	1992–2002	Sixteenth general assembly, Ankara, 7–13 December 1992; re-elected in 1995 and 1999; left office on 8 November 2002 on election to parliament
Salih Kılıç	2002–2007	Chosen after Meral's departure; re-elected at the nineteenth general assembly, Ankara, 3–7 December 2003
Mustafa Kumlu	2007–2013	Twentieth general assembly, Ankara, 6–9 December 2007; re-elected at the twenty-first, 8–11 December 2011, by 223 votes to 127 against Mustafa Öztaşkın, the candidate of the Sendikal Güç Birliği platform of ten affiliated unions; resigned on 2 September 2013
Ergün Atalay	2013–present	Elected by the executive board on Kumlu's resignation, having been the confederation's general financial secretary and president of the railway workers' union Demiryol-İş; re-elected at the twenty-second general assembly, 3–6 December 2015, and the twenty-third, 5–7 December 2019, and at the twenty-fourth, 30 November – 2 December 2023

== Activities ==
TÜRK-İŞ publishes a recurring study of household food expenditure and living costs, its hunger and poverty threshold (açlık ve yoksulluk sınırı) series.

=== Representation ===
TÜRK-İŞ takes part in Turkey's tripartite social dialogue machinery. Each year the Minimum Wage Determination Commission meets to set the national minimum wage, with employers represented by the Turkish Confederation of Employer Associations and workers by TÜRK-İŞ. The Economic and Social Council was created in 1995 as part of Turkey's application to join the European Union, put on a statutory footing in 2001 and given constitutional status in 2010. A Tripartite Consultation Board followed in 2004, obliging the Ministry of Labour and Social Security to consult workers' and employers' representatives on questions of working life, with one representative from each workers' and public employees' confederation. The confederation's own history lists some fifty domestic and international bodies on which it was represented as of 2010, among them the governing boards of the Social Security Institution and the Turkish Employment Agency.

TÜRK-İŞ has held these seats for most of its history. Buyukuslu traces them to the 1960s, when the government began to treat the confederation as labour's exclusive representative on the state's consultative boards and regulatory commissions.

How much these seats are worth has been questioned. Demet Şahende Dinler wrote in 2012 that the Economic and Social Council, legally obliged to meet every three months, had not convened since 2009 and had met irregularly before that, and that the spread of tripartite bodies was offset by uneven government representation, state control and a lack of transparent information. Alpkan Birelma records that tripartite dialogue deteriorated after the state of emergency declared in July 2016, and that the ministry convened the Tripartite Consultation Board once in 2017 and once in 2018.

=== Publications ===
TÜRK-İŞ has issued a journal, TÜRK-İŞ Dergisi, since 1963. Selin Çağatay, who draws on long runs of it, records that it followed the position of women workers in Turkey and abroad and gave particular attention to their education. Gül Neşe Kutlu's articles on women's rights appeared in it through the second half of the 1960s, and Rahime Akdoğan wrote for it while she ran the women workers' bureau. The journal is still appearing. Scanned back issues from 1963 onwards are catalogued in the confederation's own library, and recent numbers are on its website.

The confederation also publishes research of its own. Two studies appeared in 2024, one on how wages are taxed and one on the problems workers meet in the course of retiring.

== Membership ==
According to Ministry of Labour and Social Security statistics published in the Official Gazette on 28 July 2026, unions affiliated to TÜRK-İŞ had 1,260,109 members, 51.8 per cent of all union members in Turkey. The confederation had 32 affiliated unions, 31 of which were above the one per cent branch threshold required to bargain collectively. Union density in Turkey stood at 14.97 per cent in mid-2025. Collective agreements reach about 6 per cent of private sector workers. Two rules explain the gap. An agreement binds union members alone, and a union must clear membership thresholds at the workplace and across its industry before it can bargain at all.

== Affiliated unions ==
TÜRK-İŞ has thirty-two affiliated unions. English names follow the unions' own and global union federations' published usage where available, and are otherwise translations of the Turkish names.

- TARIM-İŞ, Türkiye Orman, Topraksu, Tarım ve Tarım Sanayii İşçileri Sendikası (Forestry, Soil-Water, Agriculture and Agricultural Industry Workers' Union)
- ORMAN-İŞ, Türkiye Orman İşçileri Sendikası (Forestry Workers' Union)
- TEKGIDA-İŞ, Türkiye Tütün Müskirat Gıda ve Yardımcı İşçileri Sendikası (Tobacco, Drink, Food and Allied Workers' Trade Union of Turkey)
- ŞEKER-İŞ, Türkiye Gıda ve Şeker Sanayi İşçileri Sendikası (Food and Sugar Industry Workers' Union)
- TÜRKİYE MADEN-İŞ, Türkiye Maden İşçileri Sendikası (Mine Workers' Union)
- GENEL MADEN-İŞ, Genel Maden İşçileri Sendikası (General Mine Workers' Union)
- PETROL-İŞ, Türkiye Petrol, Kimya, Lastik İşçileri Sendikası (Petroleum and Chemicals Workers' Union)
- TEKSİF, Türkiye Tekstil, Örme Giyim ve Deri Sanayii İşçileri Sendikası (Turkish Union of Textile, Knitting and Clothing Industry Workers)
- AĞAÇ-İŞ, Türkiye Ağaç ve Kağıt Sanayii İşçileri Sendikası (Wood and Paper Industry Workers' Union)
- SELÜLOZ-İŞ, Türkiye Selüloz, Kağıt ve Mamulleri Sendikası (Cellulose, Paper and Paper Products Workers' Union)
- TÜRKİYE HABER-İŞ, Türkiye Telekomünikasyon, Posta, Telgraf, Telefon, GSM, İnternet, İletişim, Bilişim, Çağrı Merkezi İşçileri ve Hizmetlileri Sendikası (Telecommunications, Post, Telegraph, Telephone, GSM, Internet, Communications, Information Technology and Call Centre Workers' and Employees' Union)
- BASIN-İŞ, Türkiye Basın Yayın Gazetecilik Grafik-Tasarım Baskı ve Ambalaj Sanayi İşçileri Sendikası (Press, Publishing, Journalism, Graphic Design, Printing and Packaging Industry Workers' Union)
- TÜRKİYE GAZETECİLER SENDİKASI (Journalists' Union of Turkey)
- BASİSEN, Banka-Sigorta İşçileri Sendikası (Union of Bank and Insurance Workers)
- BASS, Banka Finans ve Sigorta İşçileri Sendikası (Bank, Finance and Insurance Workers' Union)
- TEZKOOP-İŞ, Türkiye Ticaret, Kooperatif, Eğitim, Büro ve Güzel Sanatlar İşçileri Sendikası (Commerce, Cooperative, Education, Office and Fine Arts Workers' Union)
- TÜRK KOOP-İŞ, Türkiye Kooperatif, Ticaret, Eğitim ve Büro İşçileri Sendikası (Cooperative, Commerce, Education and Office Workers' Union)
- TÜRKİYE ÇİMSE-İŞ, Türkiye Çimento, Seramik, Toprak ve Cam Sanayi İşçileri Sendikası (Cement, Ceramic, Earth and Glass Industry Workers' Union)
- KRİSTAL-İŞ, Çimento, Cam, Toprak Sanayi İşçileri Sendikası (Cement, Glass and Earth Industry Workers' Union)
- TÜRK METAL, Türkiye Metal, Çelik, Mühimmat, Makina, Metalden Mamul Eşya ve Oto Montaj Sanayii İşçileri Sendikası (Metal, Steel, Munitions, Machinery, Metal Goods and Motor Assembly Industry Workers' Union)
- TÜRKİYE YOL-İŞ, Türkiye Yol, Yapı, İnşaat İşçileri Sendikası (Road, Building and Construction Workers' Union)
- TES-İŞ, Türkiye Enerji, Su, Gaz İşçileri Sendikası (Energy, Water and Gas Workers' Union)
- DEMİRYOL-İŞ, Türkiye Demiryolu İşçileri Sendikası (Union of Railway Workers of Turkey)
- HAVA-İŞ, Türkiye Sivil Havacılık Sendikası (Civil Aviation Union)
- TÜMTİS, Tüm Taşıma İşçileri Sendikası (All Transport Workers' Union)
- DOKGEMİ-İŞ, Türkiye Liman, Dok ve Gemi Sanayi İşçileri Sendikası (Union of Port, Dock and Ship Industry Workers of Turkey)
- TÜRKİYE DENİZCİLER SENDİKASI (Seafarers' Union of Turkey)
- SAĞLIK-İŞ, Türkiye Sağlık ve Sosyal Hizmet İşçileri Sendikası (Health and Social Service Workers' Union)
- TOLEYİS, Türkiye Otel, Lokanta ve Dinlenme Yerleri İşçileri Sendikası (Hotel, Restaurant and Recreation Establishment Workers' Union)
- TÜRK HARB-İŞ, Türkiye Harb Sanayi ve Yardımcı İş Kolları İşçileri Sendikası (Defence Industry and Allied Branches Workers' Union)
- GÜVENLİK-İŞ, Güvenlik ve Savunma İşçileri Sendikası (Security and Defence Workers' Union)
- TÜRKİYE BELEDİYE İŞ, Türkiye Belediyeler ve Genel Hizmetler İşçileri Sendikası (Union of Municipal and General Service Workers of Turkey)

The Free Workers' Unions Federation of the Turkish Republic of Northern Cyprus (Hür-İş) is also listed among the confederation's member organisations.

== International affiliations ==
TÜRK-İŞ is affiliated to the International Trade Union Confederation and the European Trade Union Confederation, and is a member of the Trade Union Advisory Committee to the OECD.

== See also ==
- Trade unions in Turkey
- Confederation of Public Employees' Unions
- Confederation of Turkish Real Trade Unions
- Confederation of Revolutionary Trade Unions of Turkey

== Bibliography ==
- Birelma, Alpkan (May 2022). Trade Unions in Turkey 2022 (PDF) (Report). Istanbul: Friedrich-Ebert-Stiftung, Turkey Office.
- Buyukuslu, Ali Rıza (1994). Trade Unions in Turkey: An Analysis of their Development, Role and Present Situation (PhD). University of Warwick.
- Çağatay, Selin (2024). "Women workers' education at the Confederation of Turkish Trade Unions: excavating histories of transnational collaboration with the ICFTU". Labor History. 65 (2): 273–287. doi:10.1080/0023656X.2023.2272125. hdl:20.500.14018/28133.
- Çelik, Aziz (2018). "DİSK'in Kuruluş ve Varoluş Yılları (1966-1970)". Çalışma ve Toplum (in Turkish). 2 (57): 617–664.
- Çelik, Aziz (2019). "Sembiyotik İlişkiler ve Otoriter Korporatizm Kıskacında 2010'lu Yıllarda Türkiye'de Sendikalaşma, Toplu Pazarlık ve Grev Eğilimleri". Uluslararası Yönetim İktisat ve İşletme Dergisi (in Turkish) (CEEİK 2018 Özel Sayısı): 39–69. doi:10.17130/ijmeb.2019CEEIK201854097.
- Çelik, Aziz, ed. (2020). DİSK Tarihi: Kuruluş, Direniş, Varoluş, Cilt 1: 1967–1975 (PDF) (in Turkish). İstanbul: DİSK Yayınları. ISBN 978-605-06165-3-8.
- Dinler, Demet Şahende (December 2012). Trade Unions in Turkey (Report). Berlin: Friedrich-Ebert-Stiftung, Department for Central and Eastern Europe.
- Doğan, Mustafa Görkem (2010). "When Neoliberalism Confronts the Moral Economy of Workers: The Final Spring of Turkish Labor Unions". European Journal of Turkish Studies (11). doi:10.4000/ejts.4321. ISSN 1773-0546.
- Friedrich-Ebert-Stiftung (June 2025). Gewerkschaftsmonitor: Türkei (PDF) (Report). FES Briefing (in German). Berlin: Friedrich-Ebert-Stiftung.
- Göktürk, Ece (2020). "Türk-İş'te Sosyal Demokrat Muhalefet ve DİSK'e Yönelim: (1970-1975)". Mülkiye Dergisi (in Turkish). 44 (2): 321–340.
- Kaya, Muzaffer (2018). "'We Too Have a Word to Say': Enactment of the 1963 Collective Bargaining, Strike and Lockout Law in Turkey". The Journal of Interrupted Studies. 1 (1): 48–68. doi:10.1163/25430149-00101002.
- Koç, Yıldırım (1999). Workers and Trade Unions in Türkiye (PDF). Ankara: TÜRK-İŞ.
- Koç, Yıldırım (2003). Türkiye İşçi Sınıfı ve Sendikacılık Hareketi Tarihi (PDF) (in Turkish). İstanbul: Kaynak Yayınları.
- Koç, Yıldırım (2022). Türkiye İşçi Sınıfı Tarihi: Osmanlı'dan 2020'ye (PDF) (in Turkish).
- Margulies, Ronnie; Yıldızoğlu, Ergin (1984). "Trade Unions and Turkey's Working Class". MERIP Reports (121): 15–20, 31. doi:10.2307/3011050. JSTOR 3011050.
- Mello, Brian (2010). "Communists and Compromisers: Explaining Divergences within Turkish Labor Activism, 1960-1980". European Journal of Turkish Studies (11). doi:10.4000/ejts.4343.
- Tuna, Orhan (1964). "Trade Unions in Turkey". International Labour Review. 90 (5): 413–431.
- TÜRK-İŞ (2019). "TÜRK-İŞ (Türkiye İşçi Sendikaları Konfederasyonu) Ana Tüzüğü" (PDF) (in Turkish). Ministry of Family and Social Services.
- TÜRK-İŞ. "Uzun Tarihçe" (PDF) (in Turkish).
