= Turkish labour law =

Overview of the labour law of Turkey

Turkish labour law provides a number of protections to employees, governed by the Labor Code, Trade Union Law, and the Constitution.

== Tatil-i Eşgaal Kanunu ==
The first of the important events in the Ottoman Empire in 1908 was the proclamation of the second constitutional era through Young Turk Revolution, and the second was the widespread strikes in the months following the proclamation. The strikes in Constantinople and Thrace began in August, and in September and October of 1908 reached large dimensions and spread to Smyrna and Adrianople. The strikes started and spread as a result of not meeting the demands for improvement of working conditions. The fact that the strikes started right after the proclamation of the second constitution were the result of the Young Turks unfulfilled promises to the workers about improvement of working conditions before the revolution. Workers in many eyalets left their jobs. The Second Constitutional government went against the strikes with the police and tried to prevent them from leaving their jobs by using force.

The legal status of the use of force was established on September 25, 1908. This legal situation is the "Tatil-i Eşgal Kanun-u Muvakkati". The fact that the law is temporary, that is, comes from the fact that it is a decision taken by the government. The law will later be passed by the parliament. With this temporary law, layoffs are prohibited. In the published firman, it was stated that the officials of the official offices could not strike. Afterwards, it was announced that railway, water, gas, electricity, tram, dock, port workers and their employees, who were against social interests, would not be able to strike.

According to these prohibitions, a strike ban has been imposed on those who work in the interests of the human community in the society. This scope is a concept that can always be expanded. On 27 July 1909, instead of this temporary law, the permanent "Tatil-i Eşgaal Kanunu" was enacted. In this law, the concept of “public service” was developed. A ban on establishing unions has been introduced in workplaces that perform services of general interest. At the same time, established trade unions were closed. The right to strike was restricted, and a long reconciliation process was envisaged before the implementation of the strike. It remained in force until the employment contract law no. 3008, which came into force in 1936.

== Labor unions ==
Labor unions are legal in Turkey, and have been present since 1947. The Constitution of Turkey affirms the right of workers to form unions "without obtaining permission" and "to possess the right to become a member of a union and to freely withdraw from membership" (Article 51). Articles 53 and 54 affirm the right of workers to engage in collective bargaining and to strike, respectively. However, Turkish unions do face certain restrictions. A union must represent at least 10% of Turkish employees to be recognized as a bargaining agent, and workers in the education, national defense, sanitation, and utilities industries are banned from striking.

== Terms of employment ==
The Labor Act of 2003 establishes a 45-hour workweek, and unless otherwise agreed upon, working time will be divided equally among days worked. With a written contract, work can be divided unequally among working days, but must not exceed 11 hours in a single day. Any work beyond 45 hours in a single week is considered overtime work, which is compensated with a raise of the hourly rate of the workers' salary by 50%. The total number of overtime hours worked may not exceed 270 hours a year. There are no standard workweeks or regulations for specific working hours in Turkey; employers may arrange the number of days and decide on the specific hours worked within the legal limits on work hours per week. The Labor Act bans discrimination based on sex, religion, or political affiliation, and mandates that employees should only be terminated with "valid cause". Those fired without what is deemed to be valid cause are entitled to be compensated through severance pay and "notice pay" for the employers' failure to provide adequate notice to the employee. The law also mandates that any employment arrangement lasting at least one year must be expressed in a written contract between the employer and employee.

Full-time employees who have worked a minimum of one year are entitled to 14 working days' paid leave per year. This increases to 20 working days after 5 years, and 26 working days after 15 years. In addition, there are eight paid holidays per year (six public holidays and two periods of religious holidays). Turkish child labor law sets the minimum age for part-time employment at 13, on condition that it is not hard physical labor and they continue to attend school, and the minimum age for full-time employment at 15. In spite of this, illegal child labor is not uncommon, especially among poor families and in rural areas.

== International cooperation ==
Turkey is a member of the International Labour Organization, and a signatory to the Freedom of Association and Protection of the Right to Organise Convention and Right to Organise and Collective Bargaining Convention, 1949.

== See also ==
- European labour law
- Trade unions in Turkey
- Demir and Baykara v Turkey (2008)
- Yazar, Karatas, Aksoy and Hep v Turkey (2003) 36 EHRR 59
