= Confederation of Turkish Real Trade Unions =

National trade union center in Turkey

HAK-İŞ
- Confederation of Turkish Real Trade Unions
- Türkiye Hak İşçi Sendikaları Konfederasyonu
- Founded: October 22, 1976
- Headquarters: Ankara, Turkey
- Location: Turkey
- Members: 838,266 (July 2026)
- Key people: Mahmut Arslan, president Yunus Değirmenci, vice-president Devlet Sert, vice-president Halil Özdemir, vice-president Mehmet Ali Kayabaşı, vice-president
- Affiliations: ITUC, ETUC
- Website: www.hakis.org.tr

The Confederation of Turkish Real Trade Unions (HAK-İŞ) is a national trade union center in Turkey. It was founded in Ankara on 22 October 1976.

At its foundation, HAK-İŞ was close to the Islamist National Salvation Party. A 2022 report published by the Friedrich-Ebert-Stiftung described the confederation as sharing a social base and ideological affinities with the Justice and Development Party (AKP).

HAK-İŞ is affiliated with the International Trade Union Confederation and the European Trade Union Confederation.

== History ==
=== Foundation and early years ===
HAK-İŞ was founded in Ankara on 22 October 1976 by seven trade unions. Its first congress was held on 13 February 1977 and elected Yasin Hatipoğlu as chairman. Following his resignation, Mustafa Taşçı assumed the chairmanship.

The confederation emerged from the Islamist milieu associated with the National Salvation Party. Its founders sought to represent workers who felt that existing trade unions did not reflect their religious and social values. Its early approach emphasised moral values and cooperation between workers and employers. Expansion was initially limited by the established organisational networks of Türk-İş in the public sector and the Confederation of Progressive Trade Unions (DİSK) in the private sector.

=== Military coup and reorganisation ===
Following the military coup of September 1980, HAK-İŞ's activities were suspended under Decision No. 8 of the National Security Council. The confederation resumed operations in February 1981. According to its official history, affiliated unions continued recruiting members during the subsequent restrictions on union activity and adapted their organisations to the trade union and collective bargaining legislation enacted in 1983.

During its reorganisation after 1980, HAK-İŞ adopted a more moderate discourse and promoted a model of "service unionism". This approach sought to supplement wage bargaining with services such as childcare, healthcare and affordable housing. In a study of the confederation, Kemal Temel noted that the effectiveness of these services in attracting members remained unclear.

In November 1987, HAK-İŞ and Türk-İş issued a joint declaration proposing cooperation, although the initiative was not sustained. In 1989, HAK-İŞ supported Çelik-İş's 137-day strike at steelworks in İskenderun and Karabük. Çelik-İş subsequently merged with Öz Demir-İş to form Öz Çelik-İş, which affiliated with HAK-İŞ.

HAK-İŞ also announced its support for the nationwide one-day work stoppage called by Türk-İş on 3 January 1991, although it expressed doubts about the effectiveness of this form of industrial action.

=== Expansion and international affiliations ===
HAK-İŞ expanded its organising activities as manufacturing developed in Anatolian cities. Temel identifies industrial growth and organising in centres such as Gaziantep, Kahramanmaraş, Konya and Kayseri as important factors in its membership expansion. His analysis places these changes alongside political relationships and changes in the confederation's approach to unionism.

In 1994, HAK-İŞ and its affiliated metalworkers' union participated in the campaign against the proposed closure of the Karabük iron and steelworks. The campaign included a city-wide protest on 8 November involving workers, local businesses and other residents. The steelworks remained open and were transferred in March 1995 to a company established by employees and local residents, becoming Kardemir.

During the 1990s, HAK-İŞ opposed the privatisation of state-owned meat, animal-feed and dairy enterprises in which its affiliate Öz Gıda-İş organised workers. It proposed that, if privatisation proceeded, the enterprises should be sold to their employees, with the confederation purchasing them on the workers' behalf. This approach drew criticism from other trade union confederations. A sale of the state-owned meat enterprise to HAK-İŞ was subsequently cancelled, and the confederation withdrew from the Democratic Platform, a coalition of unions, professional associations and other organisations that it had joined in 1993.

At its 1995 congress, HAK-İŞ revised its charter to emphasise human rights and pluralist democracy, and Salim Uslu succeeded Necati Çelik as chairman. Its applications to the European and international trade union confederations had been rejected in 1993 following objections from Türk-İş and DİSK. HAK-İŞ subsequently joined the European Trade Union Confederation on 5 December 1997 and the International Confederation of Free Trade Unions on 17 December 1997.

=== Developments in the 2000s ===
In June 2001, HAK-İŞ participated in a tripartite protocol with the Ministry of Labour and Social Security, the Turkish Confederation of Employers' Associations (TİSK), Türk-İş and DİSK. The protocol provided for an academic council to develop social legislation consistent with international standards.

In 2006, HAK-İŞ became a founding member of the International Trade Union Confederation (ITUC), alongside Türk-İş, DİSK and KESK. The new confederation brought together the International Confederation of Free Trade Unions, the World Confederation of Labour and other independent trade union organisations.

=== Developments since 2010 ===
On 4 February 2010, HAK-İŞ joined Türk-İş, DİSK, Memur-Sen, Türkiye Kamu-Sen and KESK in calling a nationwide one-day work stoppage in solidarity with Tekel workers. The workers were protesting proposed transfers to temporary public-sector employment that would reduce their employment rights following privatisation.

In 2011, Mahmut Arslan succeeded Salim Uslu as president after Uslu resigned to seek nomination as a parliamentary candidate. Arslan was subsequently elected president at the confederation's 12th ordinary congress, held in Ankara on 21–23 October 2011. The congress also elected Uslu honorary president.

On 8 April 2013, Liman-İş joined HAK-İŞ after its congress voted to leave Türk-İş earlier that year. In November 2020, Türk-İş and DİSK organised street protests against the proposed changes to employment protections, while HAK-İŞ joined them at a joint press conference. On 10 November, AKP parliamentary group deputy chair Mehmet Muş announced that two disputed provisions would be withdrawn from the bill following talks involving Türk-İş president Ergün Atalay and HAK-İŞ deputy president Osman Yıldız. In his assessment of the campaign, Alpkan Birelma described the cooperation between the three confederations as a successful defence of severance-pay rights.

HAK-İŞ's share of unionised workers increased from 17 per cent in 2013 to 37 per cent in 2019, before falling to 33 per cent in 2022. In a 2022 report, Alpkan Birelma linked much of this growth to the confederation's shared social base and ideological affinities with the governing Justice and Development Party (AKP). He cautioned, however, that these ties did not amount to a consistent government preference for all HAK-İŞ affiliates over Türk-İş unions.

Growth was particularly pronounced in municipal services and healthcare. By 2022, Hizmet-İş and Öz Sağlık-İş together accounted for nearly 60 per cent of HAK-İŞ's membership. Birelma associated their expansion with the unionisation of workers employed by public-sector subcontractors and their subsequent transfer into public employment.

== Activities ==
=== Industrial relations ===
HAK-İŞ emphasises social dialogue and cooperation between workers and employers. In a 2022 study, Alpkan Birelma characterised its approach to industrial relations as generally non-confrontational, with its leadership advocating negotiations and dialogue as central elements of trade union activity.

=== Education and training ===
HAK-İŞ has cooperated with the International Labour Organization (ILO) on training for representatives of its affiliated unions. In 2024, the organisations held a training programme at the confederation's headquarters covering fundamental labour rights, access to justice, the future of work and industrial relations in Turkey. The programme formed part of an ILO project supported by the European Union Delegation to Turkey.

HAK-İŞ established its Vocational Qualifications and Certification Centre (HAK-İŞ MEYEB) in May 2012 to provide occupational assessment and certification services. The centre assesses candidates against national occupational standards. It received authorisation from Turkey's Vocational Qualifications Authority on 17 May 2013.

=== Public-sector collective bargaining ===
HAK-İŞ participates alongside Türk-İş in negotiations with the government and public employers over framework agreements governing public-sector workers' pay and benefits. Negotiations for the 2025–2026 agreement began with the submission of the confederations' proposals to the Ministry of Labour and Social Security on 27 February 2025. The agreement was signed on 2 August 2025 following negotiations involving the government, the public employers' association TÜHİS and the union confederations.

The agreement covered approximately 600,000 workers across public institutions, including railways, highways, power plants, ministries, universities and hospitals.

=== Research and policy reports ===
In June 2024, HAK-İŞ presented Refahın Adil Paylaşımında Vergi ve Sosyal Politikalar, a report on taxation, social policy and the distribution of income and wealth in Turkey. According to the confederation, the report was the first study produced through HAK-İŞ Academy and was prepared over six months by academics from four universities. It examined proposals for taxation and social policies intended to promote a more equitable distribution of income and wealth.

HAK-İŞ also publishes Hak İş Uluslararası Emek ve Toplum Dergisi, an academic journal covering labour relations, labour economics, trade union history, social policy, employment and occupational health and safety. The journal publishes three issues annually, in April, August and December.

=== Women's participation ===
HAK-İŞ develops policies concerning women workers through its Women's Committee and successive women's strategy documents. In October 2023, the confederation held a workshop to prepare its strategy for 2024–2028. Its stated priorities included developing the capacity of the confederation and its affiliates to address women's concerns, protecting women members' rights and strengthening international cooperation.

HAK-İŞ has supported Turkey's ratification of the International Labour Organization's Violence and Harassment Convention (No. 190). Speaking on International Women's Day in March 2021, president Mahmut Arslan called for Turkey to ratify the convention, which addresses violence and harassment in the world of work.

According to HAK-İŞ, the 2024–2028 strategy also aims to strengthen communication and cooperation among women's committees, expand their use of social media and raise awareness of women's labour.

=== Minimum-wage policy ===
HAK-İŞ has advocated changes to the composition of Turkey's Minimum Wage Determination Commission. During consultations over the minimum wage for 2026, its president, Mahmut Arslan, supported Türk-İş's calls to reform the commission. On 18 December 2025, Minister of Labour and Social Security Vedat Işıkhan met separately with the leaderships of HAK-İŞ and Türk-İş to receive their proposals. The ministry subsequently stated that the views expressed during these consultations had been conveyed to the commission.

=== Domestic workers' rights ===
In January 2026, HAK-İŞ organised a workshop in Antalya on informal employment among domestic workers. Its concluding declaration called for legislative changes to extend social security coverage, remove barriers to unionisation and establish standards for domestic workers' pay and working conditions. It also recommended measures addressing the particular circumstances of migrant domestic workers.

== Organisation ==
HAK-İŞ's congress meets every four years. It comprises delegates elected by affiliated unions in proportion to their membership, together with members of the confederation's executive and audit boards. Its governing bodies include the congress, executive board, audit board and disciplinary board. It also has a board comprising the presidents of affiliated unions.

The confederation maintains departments responsible for research, industrial relations, education, international relations, social security and legal services. It also has committees addressing women's participation, young workers, workers with disabilities, and occupational health and safety.

== Affiliates ==
As of September 2026, HAK-İŞ's official directory lists 21 affiliated unions:

- Real Trade Union for Workers in Food and Tobacco and Beverages Industry (ÖZ GIDA-İŞ)
- Real Trade Union for Workers in Weaving, Knitting and Garment Industry (ÖZ İPLİK-İŞ)
- Real Trade Union in Wood Industry (ÖZ AĞAÇ-İŞ)
- Trade Union in Steel, Iron, Metal and Auto Industry (ÖZ ÇELİK-İŞ)
- Real Trade Union in Health Industry (ÖZ SAĞLIK-İŞ)
- Trade Union for Entire Municipal and General Service Industry (HİZMET-İŞ)
- Trade Union in Agriculture and Forestry Industry (ÖZ ORMAN-İŞ)
- Public Servants Union The Turkish Republic of Northern Cyprus (KAMU-SEN)
- Real Trade Union for Office, Education and Fine Art Workers (ÖZ BÜRO-İŞ)
- Finance and Bank Workers' Trade Union (ÖZ FİNANS-İŞ)
- Trade Union of Transportation Sector Workers (ÖZ TAŞIMA-İŞ)
- Trade Union for Workers in Private Security and Guarding Sectors (ÖZ GÜVEN-SEN)
- Hotel, Restaurant and Entertainment Places Workers' Trade Union (OLEYİS)
- Öz Enerji İşçileri Sendikası (ÖZ ENERJİ-SEN)
- Trade Union of Port and Shipyard Workers (LİMAN-İŞ)
- Media Workers' Trade Union (MEDYA-İŞ)
- Trade Union of Cement, Ceramic, Soil and Glass Industry Workers (ÖZ TOPRAK-İŞ)
- Trade Union for Mining Workers (ÖZ MADEN-İŞ)
- Communication Workers' Trade Union (ÖZ İLETİŞİM-İŞ)
- Trade Union of Petroleum, Chemical and Plastic Industry Workers (ÖZ PETROL-İŞ)
- Trade Union of Construction Workers (ÖZ İNŞAAT-İŞ)

== See also ==
- Confederation of Public Workers' Unions
- Confederation of Turkish Trade Unions
- Confederation of Revolutionary Trade Unions of Turkey
