= Kemal Türkler =

Turkish socialist labor union leader

President of Leader of the Workers Party of Turkey
- In office 13 February 1967 – 27 December 1977

Personal details
- Born: 1926 Denizli, Turkey
- Died: 22 July 1980 (aged 53–54) Istanbul, Turkey
- Spouse: Sabahat Türkler

Kemal Türkler (1926 – 22 July 1980) was a Turkish socialist labor union leader. He was founder and first president of Confederation of Revolutionary Trade Unions of Turkey (Türkiye Devrimci İşçi Sendikaları Konfederasyonu, DISK), and also one of the founders of the Workers Party of Turkey (Türkiye İşçi Partisi, TİP) in 1963.

== Life ==
He worked as a metal worker for a long time. He became president of Turkey's Metal Workers' Union (Türkiye Maden-Iş). He was a leading figure of the democratic trade union movement in Turkey.

== Death ==
Kemal Türkler was assassinated on 22 July 1980 in front of his home in Merter, İstanbul by ultra-nationalist MHP militants. Türkler is commemorated on the anniversary of his killing each year by various left-wing parties, unions and organizations in Turkey.

== See also ==
- List of assassinated people from Turkey

Party political offices
Preceded by Avni Erakalın	Leader of the Workers Party of Turkey (TİP); 1962–1962	Succeeded by Mehmet Ali Aybar
