= Confederation of Public Employees' Unions =

KESK
- Confederation of Public Employees' Trade Unions
- Kamu Emekçileri Sendikaları Konfederasyonu
- Founded: December 1995
- Headquarters: Ankara, Turkey
- Location: Turkey
- Members: 239.700
- Key people: Ayfer Koçak & Ahmet Karagöz, Co-presidents
- Affiliations: ITUC, ETUC
- Website: www.kesk.org.tr

The Confederation of Public Employees' Trade Unions (Turkish: Kamu Emekçileri Sendikaları Konfederasyonu, KESK) is one of the four major national trade union centers in Turkey. It was formed in 1995. KESK is affiliated with the International Trade Union Confederation, and the European Trade Union Confederation.

== Affiliated unions ==
#	Logo	Name	Acronym	Sectors	Founded	General Secretary	Membership (2014)
1		Education and Science Workers' Union	EĞİTİM-SEN	Education	1995	Kamuran KARACA	129,259
2		Sağlık ve Sosyal Hizmet Emekçileri Sendikası	SES	Health and social services	1996	Gönül ERDEN	41,225
3		Tüm Belediye ve Yerel Yönetim Hizmetleri Emekçileri Sendikası	TÜM-BEL-SEN	Local government	1990	Ömer Salih EROL	28,824
4		Büro Emekçileri Sendikası	BES	Office, banking and insurance	1998	Fikret ASLAN	19,473
5		Enerji Sanayi ve Maden Kamu Emekçileri Sendikası	ESM	Energy, industry and mining	1992	Mustafa ŞENOĞLU	2,981
6		Tarım Ormancılık Hizmet Kolu Kamu Emekçileri Sendikası	TARIM ORKAM-SEN	Agriculture and forestry	1992	Hamit KURT	3,292
7		Basın Yayın İletişim ve Posta Emekçileri Sendikası	HABER-SEN	Media and communication	1996	Cemalettin Yüksel	3,200
8		Yol, Yapı, Altyapı, Tapu ve Kadastro Emekçileri Sendikası	YAPIYOL-SEN	Public works, construction and rural services	1995	Haydar Arslan	3,959
9		Birleşik Taşımacılık Çalışanları Sendikası	BTS	Transport	1994	Nazım KARAKURT	2,336
10		Kültür ve Sanat Emekçileri Sendikası	KÜLTÜR-SANAT SEN	Cultural services	1992	Yavuz DEMİRKAYA	4,440
11		Diyanet ve Vakıf Emekçileri Sendikası	DİVES	Religious and non-government services	2002	Lokman ÖZDEMİR	711

== See also ==
- Confederation of Turkish Trade Unions
- Confederation of Turkish Real Trade Unions
- Confederation of Revolutionary Trade Unions of Turkey
