= Confederation of Revolutionary Trade Unions of Turkey =

National trade union centre in Turkey

DİSK
- Confederation of Revolutionary Trade Unions of Turkey
- Türkiye Devrimci İşçi Sendikaları Konfederasyonu

- Anthem: Anthem of 50th Anniversary; 50. Yıl Marşı (2017–current)
- Founded: 1967
- Headquarters: Istanbul, Turkey
- Location: Turkey
- Members: ▲327,000
- Leader: Arzu Çerkezoğlu
- Affiliations: ITUC, ETUC, TUAC, WFTU
- Website: www.disk.org.tr

The Confederation of Revolutionary Trade Unions of Turkey (Turkish: Türkiye Devrimci İşçi Sendikaları Konfederasyonu, DİSK) is one of the four major national trade union centres in Turkey. It was founded in 1967 as a breakaway union from the Confederation of Turkish Trade Unions, and has a membership of 327,000.

DİSK is affiliated with the International Trade Union Confederation, World Federation of Trade Unions, Trade Union Advisory Committee to the OECD and the European Trade Union Confederation.

== Development until the ban in 1980 ==
DİSK was founded by Kemal Türkler, Riza Kuas, İbrahim Güzelce, Kemal Nebioğlu and Mehmet Alpdündar representing Türkiye Maden-İş, Lastik-İş, Basin-İş, Türkiye Gıda-İş and Türk Maden-İş, respectively. All of these unions were until that time affiliated to Türk-İş, except Gida-İş which was independent.

First logo of DİSK

DİSK was born at a time when relatively broader rights and freedoms had been recognized by the Constitution of 1961. The trade union acts of 1964 accepted the right of the workers to collective bargaining and strike, and revolutionary and socialist movements gained momentum on the politic arena. In fact, with the exception of Mehmet Alpdündar, the founders of DİSK were also among the founders of the socialist Workers Party of Turkey (TİP) in 1961.

The first general assembly meeting of DİSK took place in Istanbul on 15 June 1967. Among the resolutions adopted at the congress were: support to the campaign „War Against Hunger" launched by the student organizations and establishing a solidarity fund with the assistance of larger unions to help the weaker ones. By 1967, 6 other unions (Turizm-İş, Kimya-İş, Bank-İş, EMSIS, TADSIS, Gaziantep Tekstil) had joined DİSK, which reported its total membership as 65,730.

In 1970 the Justice Party (AP) and the Republican People's Party (CHP) submitted to the parliament a draft law that would endanger the existence of any other confederation than Türk-İş. The board of DİSK convened on 3 June 1970 and decided to form resistance committees in accordance with the right of resistance in the Constitution. On 15 and 16 June the workers employed at enterprises organized by DİSK stopped work and leaving the factories started to march. This action ended with the declaration of martial law in Istanbul in the evening of 16 June. DİSK leaders and a large number of workers were arrested and tried at military courts. The law was annulled by the Constitutional Court on 9 February 1972. The confederation reported a total of 88,650 members as of end-1970.

DİSK leaders were again arrested after the military intervention on 12 March 1971, and the work of the confederation slowed down markedly during this period. Yet, further trade unions joined DİSK, raising the total membership of the confederation to 270,000 as of 1973.

The period after the fifth congress (21–24 May 1975) witnessed a boost in the popularity of DİSK, which now counted 25 members. The most important growth occurred with the affiliation of the former Türk-İş member Genel-İş under the leadership of Abdullah Baştürk. By this time the membership of DİSK was close to 600,000. In 1977 participation to the First of May demonstration organized by DİSK was even larger than the previous year, but the peaceful demonstration ended in a blood bath when unknown persons opened fire to the crowd toward the end of the rally and 35 people were killed (Taksim Square Massacre).

On the 6th congress of the confederation that was held on 22–26 December 1977 Abdullah Baştürk was elected as the head of DİSK. Fehmi Işıklar became the secretary general. In 1978 DİSK organized a First of May rally again in Taksim Square and there was a large participation in spite of the bloody events of the previous year. By 1979 martial law had expanded to cover also Istanbul, and the First of May celebrations were held in İzmir, while in 1980 the celebrations were totally banned.

On 22 July 1980 the founder of DİSK and chairman of Türkiye Maden-İş, Kemal Türkler was killed in front of his house in Merter, Istanbul. The public prosecutor in Bakırköy indicted the alleged right-wing militants Ünal Osmanağaoğlu, Aydın Eryılmaz, Abdülsamet Karakuş and İsmet Koçak for being involved in the murder. Bakırköy Heavy Penal Court 2 twice decided on acquittal of Osmanağaoğlu. Each time the Court of Cassation quashed the verdict. On 1 December 2010 Bakırköy Heavy Penal Court 2 ruled that the case had to be dropped because of lapse of time.

Before the 1980 coup, four main trade union federations with differing political orientations dominated the labor scene. The main union organization, the Confederation of Turkish Trade Unions (Türkiye İşçi Sendikaları Konfederasyonu—Türk-İş) was politically moderate, adhering to legal limits on its activities. The other major union group, the Confederation of Progressive Trade Unions of Turkey (Türkiye Devrimci İşçi Sendikaları Konfederasyonu—DİSK), originated from a faction of Türk-İş in 1967. DİSK was much smaller than Türk-İş but more militant. In addition, small numbers of workers belonged to the pro-Islamist Confederation of Turkish Just Workers' Unions (Türkiye Hak İşçi Sendikaları Konfederasyonu—Hak-İş) and the right-wing Confederation of Turkish Nationalist Workers' Unions (Türkiye Milliyetçi İşçi Sendikaları Konfederasyonu—MİSK).

== The 12 September period ==
The 1980 military intervention severely restricted trade union activities. Following the 1980 coup, the military government prohibited collective bargaining until May 1984. After 12 September 1980, the National Security Council suspended the activities of DİSK and its affiliated unions. Their assets were confiscated and put under trustee administration. 52 DİSK leaders were arrested and put on trial with the demand of death penalty on the grounds that they had „attempted to demolish the constitutional regime". By the time the military court delivered its verdict in 1986, the DISK trial had 1,477 defendants. The DISK trial was one of many mass trials that progressed ponderously through the military courts, presided over by high-ranking officers of the Turkish armed forces.

The trial at Istanbul Military Court 2 ended on 24 December 1986. The court sentenced 264 trade unionists and experts to sentences between five years, six months and 15 years, eight months' imprisonment. The military court decided in 1981 to close DİSK and ban its members. This ruling was appealed and in 1991 the Military Court of Cassation overruled this decision and acquitted the union leaders. Thus DİSK was able to resume its activities after an interval of 12 years.

== New formation in 1992 ==
The 8th general assembly of DİSK was held on 19–22 January 1992. Kemal Nebioglu was elected chairman and Süleyman Çelebi secretary general. By 1994 DİSK had 16 affiliates, 14 of which had organized over 10% of the workers in their branches, and had a total of 330,000 members. DİSK has 11 representative offices in Belgium (European Representative Office), Ankara, Adana, İzmir, Bursa, Antalya, Edirne, Diyarbakir, Samsun, İzmit and Gaziantep.

During the 11th Congress between 28 and 30 July 2000 Süleyman Çelebi was elected to chair DİSK.

The following trade unions are members of DİSK:

Turkish name	Sector	Chair
Bank-Sen	Banks	Önder Atay
Basın-İş	Press	Faruk Eren
Birleşik Metal-İş	Metal	Adnan Serdaroğlu
BTO-Sen	Forestry work and agriculture	Ayvaz Şeker
Cam Keramik-İş	Glass-pottery	Birol Sarıkaş
Dev Maden-Sen	Mine workers	Tayfun Görgün
Dev Sağlık-İş	Health	Arzu Çerkezoğlu
Dev Turizm-İş	Tourism	Mustafa Safvet Yahyaoğlu
Devrimci Yapı-İş	Construction	Özgür Karabulut
Emekli-Sen	Pensioners	Cengiz Yavuz
Enerji-Sen	Energy	Süleyman Keskin
Genel-İş	General	Remzi Çalışkan
Gıda-İş	Nutrition	Seyit Arslan
Güvenlik-Sen	Security	Serdar Aslan
İletişim-İş	Communication	Levent Dokuyucu
Lastik-İş	Petrol, chemical, tires	Alaaddin Sarı
Limter-İş	Shipyards	Kamber Saygılı
Nakliyat-İş	Transport	Ali Rıza Küçükosmanoğlu
Sine-Sen	Film	Zafer Ayden
Sosyal-İş	Social	Mustafa Ağuş
Tekstil	Textile	Kazım Doğan
Tümka-İş	Paper	Muammer Çiftçiler

== See also ==
- Confederation of Public Workers' Unions
- Confederation of Turkish Real Trade Unions
- Confederation of Turkish Trade Unions
