= List of federations of trade unions =

This is a list of federations of trade unions currently in existence. Those federations listed under each country are also known as national trade union centres and are organizations formed by trade unions which operate, in most cases, at the national level. The organizations listed in the worldwide section are industry/sectoral-specific (i.e. the GUFs) and international organizations representing national trade union centres (e.g. ITUC).

== Worldwide federations ==
=== Council of Global Unions ===
The Council of Global Unions (CGU) is made up of ten global union federations (which affiliates national-level sectoral trade unions), the largest international federation of national centres (the ITUC) and the trade union body to the OECD (TUAC).

- Building and Wood Workers' International (Note: Formerly International Federation of Building and Wood Workers (IFBWW).) (BWI)
- Education International (EI)
- IndustriALL Global Union (Note: Formed through a merger of ICEM, IMF and ITGLWF.)
- International Arts and Entertainment Alliance (IAEA)
- International Federation of Journalists (IFJ)
- International Trade Union Confederation (Note: formed through a merger of the ICFTU and the WCL.) (ITUC)
- International Transport Workers' Federation (ITF)
- International Union of Food, Agricultural, Hotel, Restaurant, Catering, Tobacco and Allied Workers' Associations (IUF)
- Public Services International (PSI)
- Trade Union Advisory Committee to the OECD (TUAC)
- UNI Global Union (UNI)

=== Other international federations ===
- International Affiliation of Writers Guilds (IAWG)
- International Confederation of Labour (ICL-CIT)
- International Workers' Association (IWA-AIT)
- World Federation of Trade Unions (WFTU)
- World Organization of Workers (WOW)

== Regional federations ==
=== Africa ===
- East African Trade Union Confederation
- ITUC Regional Organisation for Africa (ITUC-Africa)
- Organisation of African Trade Union Unity
- Organisation of Trade Unions of West Africa

=== Asia ===
- South Asian Regional Trade Union Council SARTU
- ITUC Regional Organisation for Asia and Pacific ITUC Asia Pacific

=== Europe ===
- Council of Nordic Trade Unions (NFS)
- Eurocadres
- European Trade Union Confederation (ETUC)
- European Confederation of Independent Trade Unions (CESI)
- European Federation of Public Service Unions (EPSU)
- General Confederation of Trade Unions (GCTU)

=== Americas ===
- Caribbean Congress of Labour
- Trade Union Confederation of the Americas (CSA-TUCA)

=== Middle-East ===
- International Confederation of Arab Trade Unions

== National federations ==
Country	Name	Membership	Website
Algeria	General Union of Algerian Workers (UGTA) الاتحاد العام للعمال الجزائريين Union Générale des Travailleurs Algériens	1 million	UGTA
Angola	General Centre of Independent and Free Unions of Angola (CGSILA) Central Geral de Sindicatos Independentes e Livres de Angola	50,000 (CGSILA)	
Argentina	General Confederation of Labour (Argentina) (CGT) Confederación General del Trabajo de la República Argentina; Argentine Workers' Center (CTA) Central de los Trabajadores Argentinos	?(CGT); ~1 million (CTA)	CGT; CTA
Armenia	Confederation of Trade Unions of Armenia (CTUA) Հայաստանի արհմիությունների կոնֆեդերացիա	208,000	CTUA
Australia	Australian Council of Trade Unions (ACTU)	~1.8 million	ACTU
Austria	Austrian Trade Union Federation (ÖGB) Österreichischer Gewerkschaftsbund	1,335,421	ÖGB
Albania	Confederation of Trade Unions (KSSH); The Union of the Independent Trade Unions of Albania (BSPSH)	100,000 (KSSH); 85,000 (BSPSH)	
Azerbaijan	Azerbaijan Trade Unions Confederation (ATUC) Azerbaycan Hemkarlar Ittifaqlari Konfederasiyasi	1,338,000	
Bahamas	Commonwealth of the Bahamas Trade Union Congress (CBTUC); National Congress of Trade Unions (NCTU)		
Bangladesh	Sramik Karmachari Oikya Parishad (SKOP); Bangladesh Garments Workers Unity Council (BGWUC); National Coordination Committee for Workers' Education (NCCWE)		
Barbados	Congress of Trade Unions and Staff Associations of Barbados (CTUSAB)	21,100	
Belgium	General Confederation of Liberal Trade Unions of Belgium (ACLVB-CGSLB) Algemene Centrale der Liberale Vakbonden van België / Centrale Générale des Syndicats Libéraux de Belgique; Confederation of Christian Trade Unions (ACV-CSC) Algemeen Christelijk Vakverbond / Confédération des Syndicats Chrétiens; General Federation of Belgian Labour (ABVV-FGTB) Algemeen Belgisch VakVerbond / Fédération Générale du Travail de Belgique	230,000 (ACLVB-CGSLB); 1.6 million (ACV-CSC); 1.2 million (ABVV-FGTB)	ACLVB-CGSLB; ACV-CSC; ABVV-FGTB
Belize	National Trade Union Congress of Belize (NTUCB)		
Bolivia	Bolivian Workers' Center (COB) Central Obrera Boliviana; Corriente de Renovación Independiente y Solidaridad Laboral (CRISOL)	~2 million (COB) ? (CRISOL)	
Botswana	Botswana Federation of Trade Unions (BFTU); Botswana Federation of Public, Parastatal and Private Sector Unions (BOFEPUSU)		
Brazil	Central Única dos Trabalhadores (CUT); Confederação Geral dos Trabalhadores(CGT)	~7.5 million (CUT) ? (CGT)	CUT; CGT
Burundi	Confederation of Trade Unions of Burundi (Confédération des Syndicats du Burundi, COSYBU); Trade Union Confederation of Burundi (Confédération syndicale du Burundi, CSB)	54,000 (COSYBU); 5,500 (CSB)	
Bulgaria	Confederation of Independent Trade Unions of Bulgaria (CITUB/KNSB)	390,000	
Bulgaria	Confederation of Labour (CL Podkrepa)	109,000	
Basque Country	Langile Abertzaleen Batzordeak (LAB)	45.000	LAB
Cambodia	Free Trade Union of Workers of the Kingdom of Cambodia (FTUWKC)	60,000	FTUWKC
Cape Verde	Trade Unions of Cape Verde Unity Centre (UNTC-CS) União Nacional dos Trabalhadores de Cabo verde – Central Sindical; Council of Free Labour Unions (CCSL) Conferência Cabo-Verdiana de Sindicatos Livres	20,000 (UNTC-CS); 18,000 (CCSL)	
China	All-China Federation of Trade Unions (ACFTU) 中华全国总工会 Zhōnghuá Quánguó Zǒnggōng Huì	134 million	ACFTU
Comoros	Workers Union of the Comoros (UTC) Union des Travailleurs des Comores		
Costa Rica	Central del Movimiento de Trabajadores Costarricenses (CMTC); Congress of Workers of Costa Rica (CTCR) Central de Trabajadores de Costa Rica; Costa Rican Confederation of Workers (CTRN) Confederación de Trabajadores Rerum Novarum; Confederación Unitaria de Trabajadores (CUT)	65,000 (CMTC); N/A; 90,000 (CTRN); N/A	CTRN
Croatia	Croatian Trade Union Association (HUS) Hrvatska Udruga Sindikata		HUS
Croatia	Independent Trade Unions of Croatia (NHS) Nezavisni Hrvatski Sindikati	113,589	NHS
Croatia	Union of Autonomous Trade Unions of Croatia (SSSH) Savez Samostalnih Sindikata Hrvatske	120,000	SSSH
Croatia	Workers' Trade Union Association of Croatia (URSH) Udruga radničkih sindikata Hrvatske		URSH
Cuba	Workers' Central Union of Cuba (CTC) Central de Trabajadores de Cuba	3 million (CTC)	CTC
Cyprus	Pancyprian Federation of Labour (PEO) Παγκύπρια Εργατική Ομοσπονδία	68,100 (PEO)	PEO
Cyprus	Cyprus Workers' Confederation (SEK) Synomospondia Ergaton Kyprou	66,300 (SEK)	SEK
Czech Republic	Czech-Moravian Confederation of Trade Unions (ČMKOS) Českomoravská konfederace odborových svazů		ČMKOS
Czech Republic	Association of Autonomous Trade Unions (ASO) Asociace samostatných odborů		ASO
Czech Republic	Christian Trade Union Coalition (KOK) Křesťanská odborová koalice		
Czech Republic	Trade Union Federation of Bohemia, Moravia and Silesia (OSČMS) Odborové sdružení Čech, Moravy a Slezska	1 million	OSČMS
Czech Republic	Trade Union Federation Equality (OSR) Odborový svaz Rovnost		OSR
Denmark	Danish Confederation of Professional Associations (AC) Akademikernes Centralorganisation	250,000	AC
Denmark	Danish Confederation of Trade Unions (FH) Fagbevægelsens Hovedorganisation	1.4 million	FH
Democratic Republic of the Congo	Democratic Confederation of Labour (CDT) Confédération Démocratique du Travail; General Confederation of Labour of the Congo (CGTC) Confédération Générale du Travail du Congo; National Union of Congolese Workers (UNTC) Union Nationale des Travailleurs du Congo		
Egypt	Egyptian Democratic Labour Congress (EDLC); Egyptian Federation of Independent Trade Unions (EFITU); Egyptian Trade Union Federation (ETUF)	2.5 million (FETU, 2013)	
Ethiopia	Confederation of Ethiopian Trade Unions (CETU)		
Faroe Islands	Association of Faroese Trade Unions (FA) Færøernes Arbejderforeninger		
Fiji	Fiji Islands Council of Trade Unions (FICTU)	8,000 (FICTU)	
Fiji	Fiji Trades Union Congress (FTUC)	32,000 (FTUC)	
Finland	Central Organisation of Finnish Trade Unions (SAK) Suomen Ammattiliittojen Keskusjärjestö	~1 million	SAK
Finland	Finnish Confederation of Professionals (STTK) Toimihenkilöiden ammatillinen keskusjärjestö	~640,000	STTK
Finland	Confederation of Unions for Professional and Managerial Staff in Finland (Akava) Korkeasti koulutettujen työmarkkinakeskusjärjestö	~570,000 (Akava)	Akava
France	Confédération Générale du Travail (CGT); Force Ouvrière (FO); Confédération Française Démocratique du Travail (CFDT); Confédération Française des Travailleurs Chrétiens (CFTC); Confédération Générale des Cadres (CGC); Fédération Syndicale Unitaire (FSU)	710,000 (CGT); 300,000 (FO); 875,000 (CFDT); 160,000 (CFTC); 140,000 (CGC); 165,000 (FSU)	CGT; FO; CFDT; CFTC; CGC; FSU
Hong Kong	Federation of Hong Kong and Kowloon Labour Unions (HKFLU) 港九勞工社團聯會		HKFLU
Hong Kong	Hong Kong and Kowloon Trades Union Council (HKKTUC) 港九工團聯合總會	30,000	HKKTUC
Hong Kong	Hong Kong Federation of Trade Unions (HKFTU) 香港工會聯合會	310,000	HKFTU
Iceland	Confederation of Labour (ASÍ) Alþýðusamband Íslands	89,000	ASÍ
India (Note: For an expanded list, see Trade unions in India.)	All India Central Council of Trade Unions (AICCTU)		
India	All India Trade Union Congress (AITUC)		
India	All India United Trade Union Centre (AIUTUC)		
India	Bharatiya Mazdoor Sangh (BMS)		
India	Centre of Indian Trade Unions (CITU)		CITU
India	Hind Mazdoor Sabha (HMS)		
India	Indian National Trade Union Congress (INTUC)		
India	Labour Progressive Federation (LPF)		
India	Self Employed Women's Association (SEWA)		
India	Trade Union Centre of India (TUCI)		
India	Trade Union Coordination Committee (TUCC)		
India	United Trade Union Congress (UTUC)		
Indonesia	Indonesian Trade Union Confederation (KSPI) Konfederasi Serikat Pekerja Indonesia		
Iraq	General Federation of Iraqi Workers; Federation of Workers Councils and Unions in Iraq (FWCUI)		
Israel	General Federation of Labour in Israel (GFL) ההסתדרות הכללית של העובדים בארץ ישראל HaHistadrut HaKlalit shel HaOvdim B'Eretz Yisrael	650,000	GFL
Ireland	Irish Congress of Trade Unions (ICTU)	750,000	ICTU
Italy	Italian General Confederation of Labour (CGIL) Confederazione Generale Italiana del Lavoro; Italian Confederation of Workers' Trade Unions (CISL) Confederazione Italiana Sindacati Lavoratori; Unione Italiana del Lavoro (UIL) Unione Italiana del Lavoro; General Labour Union (UGL) Unione Generale del Lavoro; Confederazione Italiana Sindacati Autonomi Lavoratori (CISAL); Confederazione Generale dei Sindacati Autonomi dei Lavoratori (CONFSAL)	5,542,667 (CGIL); 4,287,551 (CISL); 1,923,885 (UIL); 1,886,978 (UGL); 50 unions (CISAL) +1 mill. (CONFSAL)	CGIL; CISL; UIL; UGL; CISAL; CONFSAL
Kenya	Central Organization of Trade Unions (KOTU)	~350,000 (KOTU)	COTU
Libya	National Trade Unions' Federation		
Morocco	Democratic Confederation of Labour (CDT) Confédération Démocratique du Travail; Democratic Federation of Labour (FDT) Fédération Démocratique du Travail		CDT; FDT
Mauritania	Free Confederation of Mauritanian Workers (CLTM); General Confederation of Mauritanian Workers (CGTM) Confédération Générale des Travailleurs de Mauritanie; Union of Mauritanian Workers (UTM) Union des Travailleurs de Mauritanie	25,000 (CGTM)	CGTM
Mauritius	Mauritius Trade Union Congress (MTUC)	29,000 (MTUC)	MTUC
Mozambique	Mozanbique Workers' Organization (OTM) Organização dos Trabalhadores de Moçambique	250,000 (OTM)	OTM
Namibia	National Union of Namibian Workers (NUNW); Trade Union Congress of Namibia (TUCNA); Namibia National Labour Organisation (NANLO)	84,900 (NUNW); 61,900 (TUCNA); 21,000 (NANLO)	NUNW; TUCNA
New Zealand	New Zealand Council of Trade Unions (NZCTU)	300,000	NZCTU
Niger	Nigerien Confederation of Labour (CNT) Confédération Nigérienne du Travail; Union of Workers' Trade Unions of Niger (USTN) Union des Syndicats des Travailleurs du Niger	15,000 (CNT); 60,000 (USTN)	
Nigeria	Nigeria Labour Congress (NLC)	4 million (NLC)	NLC
Nepal	General Federation of Nepalese Trade Unions (GEFONT); Nepal Trade Union Congress (NTUC); All Nepal Trade Union Federation (ANTUF); Nepal Inclusive Trade Union Federation (NITUF); National Democratic Trade Union Confederation Nepal; Independent Democratic Confederation of Nepalese Trade Union; Nepal Revolutionary Workers Union (NRWU); Nepal Progressive Trade Union Federation (NPTUF)	605,000(ANTUF); 304,000 (GEFONT); 320,000 (NTUC)	GEFONT
Netherlands	Federatie Nederlandse Vakbeweging (FNV); Christelijk Nationaal Vakverbond (CNV)	1.2 million (FNV); 360,000 (CNV)	FNV; CNV
North Macedonia	Federation of Trade Unions of Macedonia (SSM)	18 affiliated unions	
Norway	Norwegian Confederation of Trade Unions (LO-N) Landsorganisasjonen i Norge; Confederation of Vocational Unions (YS) Yrkesorganisasjonenes Sentralforbund; Confederation of Unions for Professionals (UNIO) Utdanningsgruppenes Hovedorganisasjon	830,000 (LO-N); 21 trade unions (YS); 133,000 (NPA)	LO-N; YS; UNIO
Senegal	Democratic Union of Senegalese Workers (UDTS) Union Démocratique des Travailleurs de Sénégal; National Confederation of Senegalese Workers (CNTS) Confédération Nationale des Travailleurs Sénégalais; National Union of Autonomous Trade Unions of Senegal (UNSAS) Union Nationale des Syndicats Autonomes de Sénégal	60,000	CNTS
Somalia	ITUSS -Somali Congress of Trade Unions		
South Africa	Congress of South African Trade Unions (COSATU); Federation of Unions of South Africa (FEDUSA); National Council of Trade Unions (NACTU); South African Federation of Trade Unions (SAFTU)	1.8 million (COSATU); 556,000 (FEDUSA); 397,000 (NACTU); 700.000 (SAFTU)	COSATU; FEDUSA; NACTU; SAFTU
Swaziland	Trade Union Congress of Swaziland	35,000	
São Tomé and Príncipe	General Union of the Workers of São Tomé and Príncipe (UGT/STP) União Geral dos Trabalhadores de São Tomé and Príncipe; National Organization of the Workers of São Tomé and Príncipe – Central Union (ONTSTP-CS) Organizaçâo Nacional dos Trabalhadores de São Tomé and Príncipe – Central Sindical		
Tunisia	Tunisian General Labour Union (UGTT) Union Générale Tunisienne du Travail	300,000	UGTT
Tanzania	Trade Union' Congress of Tanzania (TUCT) Zanzibar Trade Union Congress (ZTUC)	320,000 (TUCT) 14,000 (ZTUC)	
Uganda	National Organization of Trade Unions (NOTU)		
Japan	Japanese Trade Union Confederation (JTUC-RENGO) 日本労働組合総連合会 Nihon Rōdōkumiai Sōrengōkai; National Confederation of Trade Unions (Zenroren) 全国労働組合総連合; National Trade Union Council (Zenrokyo)	6.6 million (RENGO); 846,362 (Zenroren); 139,424 (Zenrokyo)	RENGO; Zenroren; Zenrokyo
North Korea	General Federation of Trade Unions of Korea (GFTUK)		
Mongolia	Confederation of Mongolian Trade Unions (CMTU) Монголын Yйлдвэрчний Эвлэлyyдийн Холбоо Mongolyn Üildverchnii Evlelüüdiin Kholboo	450,000	CMTU
Taiwan	Taiwan Confederation of Trade Unions (TCTU) 全國產業總工會; Chinese Federation of Labour (CFL) 中華民國全國總工會	280,000	TCTU; CFL
Laos	Lao Federation of Trade Unions (LFTU)	77,000	
Malaysia	Malaysian Trades Union Congress (MTUC)	500,000	MTUC
Philippines	Alliance of Progressive Labor (APL); Confederation of Filipino Workers (CFW); Federation of Free Workers (FFW); May First Labour Movement (KMU, Kilusang Mayo Uno); Trade Union Congress of the Philippines (TUCP); Bukluran ng Manggagawang Pilipino (BMP)	500,000 (combined)	APL; FFW; KMU; TUCP
Thailand	Labour Congress of Thailand (LCT)	N/A	
Vietnam	Vietnam General Confederation of Labour (VGCL) Tổng Liên đoàn Lao động Việt Nam	4.3 million	VGCL
Pakistan	Pakistan Labour Federation (PLF); All Pakistan Federation of United Trade Unions (APFUTU); Pakistan Workers Confederation; Pakistan Workers' Federation; All Pakistan Trade Union Federation; All Pakistan Federation of Labour; All Pakistan Federation of Trade Unions; All Pakistan Trade Union Congress; Pakistan National Federation of Trade Unions; Pakistan Trade Union Defence Campaign (PTUDC); General Federation of Trade Unions (GFTU)		
Jordan	General Federation of Jordanian Trade Unions		
Palestine	Palestine General Federation of Trade Unions (PGTUF); Federation of Independent & Democratic Trade Unions & Workers' Committees in Palestine (CIDTU)	~290,000 (PGTUF); ~50,000 (CIDTU)	PGTUF; CIDTU
Lebanon	General Confederation of Lebanese Workers		
Germany	German Confederation of Trade Unions (DGB) Deutscher Gewerkschaftsbund	7 million	DGB
Germany	German Civil Service Federation (DBB) Deutscher Beamtenbund	1,250,000	DBB
Germany	German Christian Workers' Federation (CGB) Christlicher Gewerkschaftsbund	300,000 (CGB)	CGB
Greece	General Confederation of Greek Workers (GSEE) Geniki Synomospondia Ergaton Ellados; All-Workers Militant Front (PAME) Panergatiko Agonistiko Metopo	450,000; 850,000	GSEE; PAME
Hungary	National Confederation of Hungarian Trade Unions (MSZOSZ)	240,000 (MSZOSZ)	MSZOSZ
Hungary	Autonomous Trade Union Confederation (ASZSZ)	150,000 (ASZSZ)	ASZSZ
Malta	Confederation of Malta Trade Unions (CMTU); General Workers' Union (GWU); Malta Workers' Union (UHM)	36,000 (CMTU); 26,000 (UHM)	CMTU
Poland	Solidarity (NSZZ) Niezależny Samorządny Związek Zawodowy "Solidarność; All-Poland Alliance of Trade Unions (OPZZ) Ogólnopolskie Porozumienie Związków Zawodowych	1,185,000 (NSZZ); 2.5 million (OPZZ)	NSZZ; OPZZ
Romania	National Confederation of Free Trade Unions (CNSLR-B) Confederaţia Naţională a Sindicatelor Libere din România – Frăţia; Cartel ALFA (NTUC) Confederatia Nationalã Sindicalã; Democratic Trade Union Confederation of Romania (CSDR); Meridian Confederatia Nationala Sindicala	800,000 (CNSLR-B); 1 million (NTUC); 650,000 (CSDR); 170,000 (MERIDIAN)	CNSLR; NTUC
Russia	Confederation of Labour of Russia (KTR) Конфедерация труда России; Federation of Independent Trade Unions of Russia (FNPR) Федерация Независимых Профсоюзов России; Sotsprof Соцпроф; Union of Trade Unions of Russia (SPR) Союз профсоюзов России		KTR; FNPR; SOTSPROF; SPR
Turkey	Confederation of Public Workers' Unions (KESK); Confederation of Revolutionary Trade Unions of Turkey (DİSK); Confederation of Turkish Real Trade Unions (HAK-İŞ); Confederation of Turkish Trade Unions (TÜRK-İŞ)	300,000 (KESK); 330,000 (DİSK); 340,000 (HAK-İŞ); 1.75 million (claimed) (TÜRK-İŞ)	KESK; DİSK; HAK-İŞ; TÜRK-İŞ
Greenland	National Confederation of Trade Unions of Greenland (SIK) Sulinermik Inuussutissarsiuteqartut Kattuffiat		SIK
Slovak Republic	Confederation of Trade Unions of the Slovak Republic (KOZSR) Konfederácie odborových zväzov Slovenskej republiky	180,000	KOZSR
Slovenia	Association of Free Trade Unions (ZSSS) Zveza Svobodnih Sindikatov Slovenije	180,000	ZSSS
Switzerland	Swiss Federation of Trade Unions (SGB/USS) Schweizerischer Gewerkschaftsbund / Union syndicale suisse Swiss Workers' Federation (SWF) Travail.Suisse	390,000 (SGB); 140,000 (SWF)	SGB; SWF
Saint Vincent and the Grenadines	National Labour Congress		
Singapore	National Trades Union Congress (NTUC)	650,000	NTUC
South Korea	Korean Confederation of Trade Unions (KCTU) 전국민주노동조합총연맹 Jeon-guk Minju Nodong Johap Chongyeonmaeng; Federation of Korean Trade Unions (FKTU) 한국노동조합총연맹 Hanguk Nodong Johap Chongyeonmaeng	682,418 (KCTU); 740,308 (FKTU)	KCTU; FKTU
Syria	General Federation of Trade Unions (Syria)		
Sweden	Swedish Trade Union Confederation (LO-S) Landsorganisationen i Sverige; Swedish Confederation of Professional Employees (TCO) Tjänstemännens Centralorganisation; Swedish Confederation of Professional Associations (SACO) Sveriges Akademikers Centralorganisation; Central Organisation of the Workers of Sweden (SAC) Sveriges Arbetares Centralorganisation	2 million (LO-S); 1.3 million (TCO)	LO-S; TCO SAC
Ukraine	Federation of Trade Unions of Ukraine (FTUU); The National Confederation of Trade Unions (NCTU); Confederation of Free Trade Unions of Ukraine (KVPU)	12 million (FTUU); 3 million (NCTU); 148,000 (KVPU)	FTUU; KVPU
Luxembourg	Confederation of Independent Trade Unions of Luxembourg (OGB-L) Confédération Générale du Travail de Luxembourg; Luxembourg Confederation of Christian Trade Unions (LCGB) Lëtzebuerger Chrëschtleche Gewerkschafts-Bond; White-collar Union Federation (ALEBA/UEP-NGL-SNEP)	50,000 (OGB-L); 40,000 (LCGB)	OGB-L; LCGB
Portugal	General Confederation of the Portuguese Workers (CGTP) Confederação Geral dos Trabalhadores Portugueses; General Union of Workers (UGT) União Geral dos Trabalhadores; Union of Independent Trade Unions (USI) União dos Sindicatos Independentes	800,000 (CGTP); 400,000 (UGT); 15,000 (USI)	CGTP; UGT; USI
Spain	Comisiones Obreras (CC.OO.); Confederación General del Trabajo (CGT); Confederación Nacional del Trabajo (CNT); Unión General de Trabajadores (UGT); Union Sindical Obrera (USO)	~1 million (CCOO); 60,000 (CGT); 800,000 (UGT)); 110,000 (USO)	CCOO; CGT; CNT; UGT; USO
United Kingdom	Trades Union Congress (TUC); Scottish Trades Union Congress (STUC); General Federation of Trade Unions (GFTU); Irish Congress of Trade Unions (ICTU–Northern Ireland)	6.5 million (TUC); 630,000 (STUC); 214,000 (GFTU); 215,000 (ICTU–NI)	TUC; STUC; GFTU; ICTU (NI)
Grenada	Grenada Trades Union Council (GTUC)		
Guyana	Federation of Independent Trade Unions of Guyana (FITUG); Guyana Trades Union Congress (GTUC)	34,000 (FITUG); 16,000 (GTUC)	
Jamaica	Jamaica Confederation of Trade Unions		
Trinidad and Tobago	Federation of Independent Trade Unions and Non-Governmental Organisations (FITUN); National Trade Union Centre of Trinidad and Tobago (NATUC)	80,000 (NATUC)	
Mexico	Authentic Labor Front (FAT) Frente Auténtico del Trabajo	2 million	
Mexico	Confederation of Mexican Workers (CTM) Confederación de Trabajadores de México	5.5 million	
Mexico	Regional Confederation of Mexican Workers (CROM) Confederación Regional Obrera Mexicana	~600,000 (CROM)	
Mexico	General Confederation of Workers (CGT) Confederación General de Trabajadores		
Panama	Central National de Trabajadores de Panama (CNTP); Confederation of Workers of the Republic of Panama (CTRP) Confederación de Trabajadores de la República de Panamá; Convergencia Sindical (CS); General Confederation of Workers of Panama (CGTP) Confederación General de Trabajadores de Panamá	N/A; 35,000 (CTRP); N/A; N/A	
English Canada	Canadian Labour Congress (CLC); Confederation of Canadian Unions (CCU)	3 million 7,500	CLC; CCU
Quebec	Congress of Democratic Trade Unions (CSD) Centrale des syndicats démocratiques Quebec House of Labour (CSQ) Centrale des syndicats du Québec; Confederation of National Trade Unions (CSN) Confédération des syndicats nationaux Quebec Federation of Labour (FTQ) Fédération des travailleurs et travailleuses du Québec	70,000 (CSD); 175,000 (CSQ); 300,000 (CSN); 500,000 (FTQ)	CSD; CSQ; CSN; FTN
United States	American Federation of Labor–Congress of Industrial Organizations (AFL–CIO); Change to Win Federation (CTW); Industrial Workers of the World (IWW)	9,000,000+ (AFL); 6,000,000 (CTW); 2,000 (IWW)	AFL; CTW; IWW
Venezuela	Confederación de Trabajadores de Venezuela (CTV); Unión Nacional de Trabajadores (UNT)		CTV; UNT
Western Sahara	General Workers' Union of Saguia el-Hamra and Río de Oro (UGTSARIO)		
Zambia	Federation of Free Trade Unions of Zambia (FFTUZ); Zambia Congress of Trade Unions (ZCTU)		
Zimbabwe	Zimbabwe Congress of Trade Unions (ZCTU); Zimbabwe Federation of Trade Unions (ZFTU)	400,000 (ZCTU)	ZCTU

== See also ==
- List of trade unions
- List of international labour organizations
