= List of trade unions in Pakistan =

This is a list of some major Trade Unions in Pakistan

Major Confederation

- Pakistan Workers Confederation

Pakistan Labour organization 'Major Federations

- National Labour Federation
- All Pakistan Federation of United Trade Unions
- Pakistan Transport & General Workers' Federation
- All Pakistan Trade Union Federation
- Pakistan Workers' Federation
- Pakistan Labour Federation
- All Pakistan Federation of Labour
- All Pakistan Federation of Trade Unions
- The General Federation of Trade Unions
- All Pakistan Trade Union Congress
- Pakistan National Federation of Trade Unions
- All Pakistan Oil & Gas Employees Federation (APOGEF)
- All Pakistan WAPDA Hydro Electric Workers Union
- National Trade Union Federation
- Pakistan Central Mines Labour Federation
- Pakistan Federation of Chemical, Energy, Mine and General Workers Union
- Pakistan Mine Workers' Federation
- Pakistan Textile Workers' Federation
- Pakistan Textile, Garments and Leather Workers' Federation
- Pakistan Trade Union Defence Campaign (PTUDC)

Major Unions

- Railway Worker's Union (Open Lines)
- Railway Worker's Union (Workshops)
