= Trade unions in Pakistan =

- National organization(s): Pakistan Workers Confederation, Pakistan Trade Union Defence Campaign, Pakistan Workers' Federation
- Regulatory authority: NIRC - NATIONAL INDUSTRIAL RELATIONS COMMISSION, Ministry of Labour (Pakistan)
- Primary legislation: Industrial Relations Act 2012
- Total union membership: 1.4 million
- Percentage of workforce: 2.2%
- By industry: Agriculture, hunting, forestry and fishing: 42%; Mining and quarrying: NA; Manufacturing: 16%; Electricity, gas and water supply: 1%; Construction: 7%; Wholesale and retail trade & Repair of Vehicles and Motorcycles: 15%; Transport, storage and communication: 5%; Financial, insurance, real estate and business service: NA; Community, social and personal services: NA; Activities & other services *: 14%

Global Rights Index
- 4 Systematic violations of rights

International Labour Organization
- Pakistan is a member of the ILO

Trade unions in Pakistan are regulated under provincial industrial relations acts. Under the Constitution of Pakistan, labour is considered a shared responsibility of the federal and provincial governments. The latest Industrial Relation Act was promulgated on 12 March 2012 by President of Pakistan. National Industrial Relations Commission (NIRC) was established under Labour Policy, 1972 as a quasi-judicial authority to promote genuine trade unionism, setting up industry-wise federations of unions and at the national levels. According to NIRC, in 2016 there were 1,390 trade unions with registered 1.4 million members. There are 16 registered federations and the ratio of total union members to total employment is 2.2%.

== History ==
The early history of trade unions in the country traces its foundation in British India. After its inception, Pakistan has inherited strong railways and port unions. Popular labor unions at that time were in Lahore Railway Workshop, led by Mirza Ibrahim, Hydro-Electric Central Labor Union, led by Bashir Bakhtiar and the Komal Flour Mill, Ganesh Khopra (Coconut) Mill in Sindh which was organized by Narain Das. Founder of Pakistan Muhammad Ali Jinnah was also a labour leader, he was elected President of All India Postal Staff Union in 1925.

The rise of trade union struggle was seen during 1968 movement in Pakistan, when leaders of major unions and federation joined hands against Ayub Khan in first week of March they organized March as the workers' "demands week".

As an aftermath of 1988 elections, Benazir Bhutto came into power, during power she under pressure from the World Bank and IMF she adopted privatization policies which were continued by Nawaz Sharif. Owing to this liberalization process, contractual labour was introduced which reduced the bargaining power of unions. During Pervez Musharraf period, struggle of the PTCL workers against privatization attracted many activists to form alliances.

Labour laws relating to trade unions or the Industrial Relations Act 2012 do not enable workers to form unions. There is also very little room for those who are already organized in trade unions to bargain for the collective rights of workers.

== Trade unions in Pakistan ==
Major confederation

- Pakistan Workers Confederation

Pakistan Labour organization 'major federations

National Labour Federation is Registered trade union with National Industrial relations commission

- Pakistan Workers' Federation
- All Pakistan Trade Union Federation
- Pakistan Labour Federation
- All Pakistan Federation of Labour
- All Pakistan Federation of Trade Unions
- All Pakistan Federation of United Trade Unions
- All Pakistan Trade Union Congress
- Pakistan National Federation of Trade Unions
- Pakistan Trade Union Defence Campaign (PTUDC)

Major unions

- Railway Worker's Union (Open Lines)
- Railway Worker's Union (Workshops)
