= National Trade Union Confederation =

National Trade Union Confederation may refer to:

- National Trade Union Confederation (Romania)
- National Trade Union Confederation – Meridian, Romania
- National Trade Union Confederation of Moldova
- National Trade Unions Confederation, Mauritius
- National Trade Union Confederation (Cambodia)

== See also ==
- National trade union center
- List of federations of trade unions
