= All Pakistan Confederation of Labour =

APCOL
- All Pakistan Confederation of Labour
- Predecessor: PFL, EPFL
- Successor: PNFTU, APFOL, APFTU
- Founded: 1950
- Location: Pakistan
- Members: 456,000 (1962)
- Affiliations: ICFTU; Brussels, Belgium

The All Pakistan Confederation of Labour (APCOL) was a national trade union centre in Pakistan. It was formed in 1950 through a merger of PFL and EPFL and in the following years became the dominant trade union centre through government sponsorship. In the 1960s, it dissolved into PNFTU, APFOL and APFTU.

== History ==
After independence, Pakistan's trade unions were organised in the Pakistan Federation of Labour and the East Pakistan Federation of Labour. In 1950, these federations merged into the APCOL, though the new West Pakistan Federation of Labour and East Pakistan Federation of Labour retained a large degree of autonomy. A.M. Malik became the trade union centre's president and later Pakistan's Labour Minister, M.A. Khatib its general secretary. Bashir Ahmad Khan Bakhtiar and Chaudry Rehmatullah led the West Pakistan Federation of Labour, while Aftab Ali and Faiz Ahmed led the East Pakistan Federation of Labour.

APCOL's formation was encouraged by the Pakistani government to balance the growth of Communist-aligned trade unions such as the Pakistan Trade Union Federation. The government opposed the use of trade unions for strikes or for political purposes. This led to an exodus of left-wing trade unionists from APCOL, especially from the more communist-aligned East Pakistan unions. However, the East Pakistan Federation of Labour still retained a notably more left-wing slant.

In 1950, APCOL had 320,000 members. This dropped to 279,000 in March 1955, with many members switching affiliation to Communist-aligned trade unions. However, the Pakistani government banned these unions in 1954 and in 1955 made APCOL into the only representative trade union centre. However, following the 1958 Pakistani coup d'état, trade union activity was suppressed and APCOL started declining. Still, by 1962, APCOL represented almost two-thirds of the membership of registered trade unions in Pakistan, claiming 178 affiliated unions with 456,000 total members.

In that year, the Petroleum Workers' Federation, the Cigarette Labour Union and others broke away to form the Pakistan National Federation of Trade Unions (PNFTU) led by Mohammad Sharif and Rashid Mohammad. More splinters followed, including the All Pakistan Federation of Trade Unions (APFTU) led by Bashir Ahmad Khan Bakhtiar and Khurshid Ahmad and the All Pakistan Federation of Labour (APFOL) under Rehmatullah Durrani and Chaudry Rehmatullah. Due to these splits, APCOL was de-affiliated from the ICFTU. Meanwhile, PNFTU was affiliated with the ICFTU in 1964, APFOL in 1966 and APFTU in 1974.
