= Trade unions in Cape Verde =

- National organization(s): CCSL, UNTC-CS
- Total union membership: 30,000 (est.)

International Labour Organization
- Cape Verde is a member of the ILO

Convention ratification
- Freedom of Association: 1 February 1999
- Right to Organise: 3 April 1979

Trade unions in Cape Verde have operated in three distinct periods: prior to the country's independence from Portugal in 1975, from 1975 to 1990 under the single-party rule of the PAIGC/PAICV and since 1990 under a pluralistic party and trade union environment. While the constitution protects the right to organise and form unions without restriction, the right to strike is curtailed. Two national trade union centres presently exist: the Cape Verde Confederation of Free Trade Unions (CCSL) and the National Union of Workers of Cape Verde - Central Union (UNTC-CS).

== Colonial period ==
Before 1975, organised workers were mostly represented in professional structures which did little activity of a trade union nature, such as collective bargaining.
