= Public Service Union =

Public Service Union is the name of:

- Dominica Public Service Union
- Public Service Union of Belize
- Public Service Union of Namibia
- Queensland Public Sector Union in Australia
- St. Vincent and the Grenadines Public Service Union
