= CFW =

CFW may refer to:

- CFW, the SAME code for a Coastal Flood Warning
- CFW Communications, now nTelos
- Campaign for the Feminine Woman, later Concern for Family and Womanhood, a British anti-feminist organisation
- Confederation of Filipino Workers
- Custom firmware
