= General Assembly of Cyrenaican Labor Unions =

The General Assembly of Cyrenaican Labor Unions was a trade union centre in Cyrenaica, Libya. Rajab al-Nayhoum was the president of the organization. Al-Nayhoum, a pioneer of the Libyan labour movement and a sailor who had acquainted trade union movements abroad, had tried to begin organizing union 1945 but had confronted problems from British authorities. After the adoption of labour legislation in 1951, al-Nayhoum set up a Port Workers Union the following year. During 1952-1953 five more unions were formed in Cyrenaica. Together the six unions formed the General Assembly of Cyrenaican Labor Unions. The General Assembly of Cyrenaican Labor Unions had around 3,000 members.

The General Assembly of Cyrenaican Labor Unions remained outside the Libyan General Workers Union and maintained an independent line. Whilst the Libyan General Workers Union was a founding member of ICATU, al-Nayhoum was reportedly denied participation at an ICATU meeting in Cairo in September 1958.
