= Union of Independent Trade Unions =

Union of Independent Trade Unions may mean:

- Union of Independent Trade Unions (Portugal)
- Union of the Independent Trade Unions of Albania
- Free Trade Union Confederation of Latvia
