= Joseph Schaack =

Luxembourgish politician

Joseph Schaack (born 26 March 1945 in Luxembourg City) is a politician from Luxembourg. He is a leading member of the General Confederation of Civil Servants. In 1999 he ran for election for the Democratic Party. From 1 November 2004 to 4 February 2008, he was the director of the customs administration.
