= Muhammad Naseem Rao =

Pakistani trade unionist

- محمد نسیم راؤ
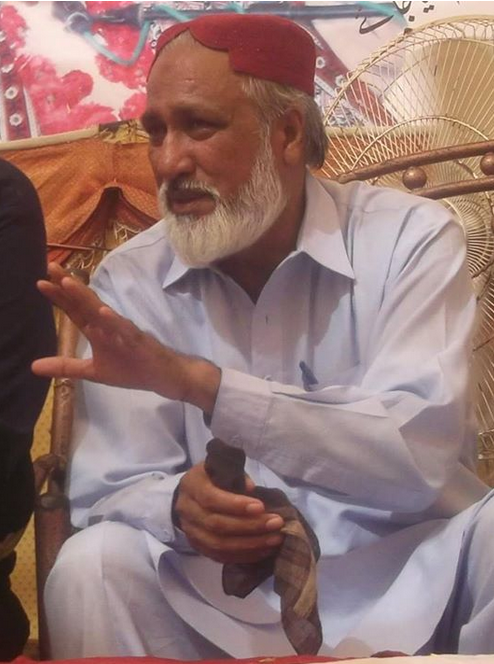
- Rao in 2014
- Born: 12 April 1962 (age 64)
- Education: Sindh University; Karachi University
- Organizations: Railway Workers' Union (Open Lines); Pakistan Transport & General Workers' Federation

Muhammad Naseem Rao (Urdu: محمد نسیم راؤ) is a Pakistani labour leader born on 12 April 1962 at Nabisar Road Tehsil Kunri, District Umerkot Sindh. He is the elected Central General Secretary of the Pakistan's oldest and second-largest industry-wise union, Railway Workers' Union (Open Lines), representing more than 90,000 workers all over in Pakistan.

== Early life ==
He is a highly qualified person with master's degrees in Economics & Law. He did Masters in Economics from Sindh University Jamshoro and LL.B from Karachi University.

== Career ==
In 1982, he started his political activities from the platform of his student union. He participated in left-wing movements. In 1986, he joined a trade union as an activist. He worked with the founder of the Labour Movement in the subcontinent Mirza Mohammad Ibrahim (Late). He represented Pakistan at International Conferences and Seminars.

He represented railway workers before the Senate Standing Committee on Railways. For the first time, a labour leader was called by the Senate of Pakistan to address workers' issues.

RWU is an affiliated with International Transport Workers' Federation (ITF), a global union federation.

He is a Central President of Pakistan Transport & General Workers' Federation, the largest transport federation in Pakistan.

== Recognition ==
- Mirza Mohammad Ibrahim Yaadgari Award (2009) by World Labour Organisation (WLO) London
