= Trade unions in the Comoros =

- National organization(s): CTTC
- Primary legislation: Labour code
- Total union membership: 5,000

International Labour Organization
- Comoros is a member of the ILO

Convention ratification
- Freedom of Association: 1978
- Right to Organise: 1978

Comoros, an island country has one trade union center, the Confederation of Workers of Comoros (CTTC; French: Confederation des Travailleuses et Travailleurs des Comores) which has 5,000 members and is affiliated to ITUC and OATUU.

== History ==
Comoros became independent from French colonial rule in 1975. The first trade union formed shortly after. The neighboring island Mayotte remains a region of France. No trade union existed on Mayotte island until 1979.

Workers have the right to join trade unions, collectively bargain and take part in strikes. Teachers unions are the most active affiliate of CTTC.

== See also ==
- Workers Union of the Comoros
