= McGill University Non-Academic Certified Association =

Labour union at McGill University

The McGill University Non-Academic Certified Association (MUNACA) is a labour union at McGill University representing roughly 1700 non-academic support staff.

== History ==
=== Formation ===
MUNACA was formed in 1992 and certified as a union by the Quebec Labour Relations Commission in 1993. Its first president, Allan Youster, was a former president of the non-unionized McGill University Non-academic Staff Association (MUNASA) for ten years.

=== First collective agreement ===
MUNACA tabled its proposal for a first collective agreement in August 1995. In late summer 1996, MUNACA requested the appointment of a conciliator due to stalled negotiations and a multi-year salary freeze. Conciliation began on September 17, 1996, but the conciliator stated that an impasse had been reached on April 9, 1997 over issues of salary and job security, leading McGill to call in an arbitrator with the authority to set the terms of an agreement. In 1998, MUNACA members voted to engage in pressure campaign, including sizeable protests supported by fellow unions SEIU Local 800 (property services) and AGSEM (teaching assistants). Meanwhile, attrition reduced the size of the union by 500. In February 1999, MUNACA members voted overwhelmingly in favor of a contract which included a retroactive 3.5% salary increase with 1% progression followed by a 1.5% increase with 1.5% progression. The contract eliminated discretionary merit increases, placed greater (but not exclusive) weight on seniority in job selection, and included a compromise on employment security. Non-unionized staff also received largely the same salary increase.

=== Second collective agreement ===
Negotiations began for a second collective agreement in November 2002. In September 2003, the university added a new demand to the table: increasing work hours for MUNACA members without additional compensation. In response, MUNACA members authorized pressure tactics, including a protest, and suspended talks until the demand was rescinded. Concern about overwork of MUNACA members was raised by faculty and MUNASA members at the McGill Senate. McGill later withdrew the demand for increased working hours and the parties entered conciliation at McGill's request. In December 2003, MUNACA members overwhelmingly rejected McGill's offer and authorized a strike. They also participated in a voluntary half-day walkout and demonstration. Partly at issue were floating holidays and summer Fridays. Later in December, MUNACA members voted to accept a contract offering 2% scale increases and 2.2-2.5% progressions, along with compensation for the loss of summer Fridays and an increase in salary minima.

=== Interim ===
As MUNACA was not affiliated with any larger union, several attempts were made by both members and external unions to affiliate, sometimes leading to strife. Additionally, MUNACA was forced to deal with representatives sending messages judged prejudicial to the good name of the union. In March 2005, MUNACA raised dues by 10% to implement a strike fund in preparation for the next round of negotiations.

=== Third collective agreement ===
Negotiations for a third collective agreement began on December 17, 2007. The university originally offered annual scale increases of 2% and progression of 2.5% and reiterated requests for increased work hours and reform of summer Fridays. However, on February 7, 2008, the university tabled new demands, reducing its salary offer to scale increases of 1% and progression of 1-1.5% and requesting an end to employment security for newer employees. After reaching an impasse, the union called a general meeting on August 28, 2008, days before the start of the school year, to vote to reject McGill's offer and authorize pressure tactics, up to and including a strike, in response. With the room filled to capacity and some workers denied entry by security guards due to fire codes, a fire alarm was pulled, forcing an evacuation and preventing the strike vote from taking place. Soon after, an agreement in principle between the negotiation teams was reached including 1-2% scale increases and 1.5% progression, status quo on summer Fridays, night and weekend premiums, and lump sum payments for members at their pay maximum. However, 62% of MUNACA members rejected this proposal at a general assembly, largely due to the disparity in wage increase compared to other jobs at McGill. On September 23, 2008, MUNACA filed for conciliation after the university signaled it would not change its offer. On October 14, 2008, the university responded by offering 2% scale increases and 1% progression for four years, a better offer for employees at their pay maximum. MUNACA rejected this offer after meeting with its Council representatives. After the university responded by offering an 8.5% increase over three years, on December 4, 2008, the general membership voted 68.4% to formally reject the university's offer and 65.1% to authorize pressure tactics up to an including a general strike. In response, MUNACA held several demonstrations and printed several full page ads in major Montreal newspapers. The conciliator recommended a 9% salary increase over three years. Perhaps partly due to fear of striking during an economic downturn, MUNACA members voted 84% to accept the offer, though the recommendation was accepted "without enthusiasm", according to then-President Maria Ruocco.

=== Reaction of University Administration - Removal of Senate Representation ===
Members of MUNACA became ineligible to sit on the McGill Senate upon unionizing, due to regulations permitting staff representation to only non-unionized staff. Because the formation of MUNACA reduced non-unionized staff from 2,719 to 781, the Senate Steering Committee considered the case. The Steering Committee recommended against allowing union members to sit on Senate, partly for fear they would vote as a bloc, and further recommended reducing non-unionized staff representation from six members to three. The recommendation to reduce staff representation was defeated, but MUNACA members remain ineligible to sit on Senate.
