= Belize Energy Workers Union =

Belizean Labour union

- Abbreviation: BEWU
- Formation: 1981; 45 years ago
- Founders: Winston Jones, Dorla Prior Staine, & Ronald Williams
- Type: Trade union
- Purpose: Belize Electricity Limited
- Origins: United General Workers' Union
- Region served: Belize
- Fields: Energy
- President: Henry Balan
- Affiliations: National Trade Union Congress of Belize, Public Services International

Belize Energy Workers' Union (BEWU) is a labour union in Belize which represents workers at Belize Electricity Limited. The union is affiliated with the National Trade Union Congress of Belize. The current President is Henry Balan. Previous Presidents include Ivan Acosta, Mark Butler, Raymond Sheppard, Jose Torres, Marvin Mora, Sean Nicholas, Jose Escalera, and Rutilio Witzil amongst many other since 1981.

== History ==
The Belize Energy Workers Union (BEWU) was established in October 1981. The BEWU is a breakaway Union from the United General Workers' Union (UGWU) as a consequence of unfair representation felt by the members. The workers were part of the membership of UGWU for a fair period of time previous to the Belize Energy Workers Union. However, in latter years, the members felt that its interest was not served justly as the Union had other priorities.

This gave birth to the Belize Energy Workers' Union as stated above. The founding members having served as Shop Stewards, Laison Officers etc. on the UGWU for the interest of the Belize Electricity Board workers felt the time had come to chart their own destiny in the atmosphere of loyal brotherhood, sisterhood and solidarity within the Union Movement.

The Belize Energy Workers' Union and members of the past Union remain in solidarity for the plight of workers as the need for Unions to be in the interest of all workers. The BEWU first President was Mr. Winston Jones, the first General Secretary was Mrs. Dorla Prior Staine and the first Treasurer was Mr. Ronald Williams.

== Affiliations ==
The BEWU belongs to the National Trade Union Congress of Belize to support workers throughout Belize. Currently affiliated members of the Public Services International, a global confederation of trade unions.

== Goals and objectives ==
The goals and objectives are for continual security for its members in the form of jobs, better wages, benefits and safe working conditions. The Union has achieved this with negotiation between BEL and the BEWU. Two major Collective Agreements were signed in 1988 and in November 2000. Current negotiations have recently being completed in 2008. These agreements represent complete coverage of all aspects labor of issues for employees. Its current membership is around 150 workers considered essential by the Labour Laws of Belize.

The contributions are under the form of procuring continued employment for its members, better wages, benefits such as pension, good salary, insurance coverage, lower electricity bills, and vacation grants The BEWU is contributing to Belize by supporting employment to the people of Belize with decent salaries. This makes the spending power at moderate levels. The Insurance provides higher quality medical coverage in and out of the country, including the USA. The vacation grants provide an opportunity to the people to make visits to other countries thereby increasing knowledge and experience. The pensions are collective savings over the years of employment for use upon retirement age for comfort in senior years. In summary, the Union contributes to better social and economic conditions for the country.
