= UNTC =

UNTC may refer to:

- United Nations Treaty Collection, a website with information on United Nations treaties
- National Union of Congolese Workers (Union Nationale des Travailleurs du Congo), in the Democratic Republic of the Congo
- UNTC-CS (União Nacional dos Trabalhadores de Cabo Verde – Central Sindical, 'National Union of Workers of Cape Verde - Central Union')
