= CTRP =

CTRP may mean:

- The Confederation of Workers of the Republic of Panama (Confederación de Trabajadores de la República de Panamá)
- The NASDAQ ticker symbol for Ctrip, a Chinese travel agency
- Comprehensive Tax Reform Program, part of Fiscal policy of the Philippines, enacted in 1997
- The C1q/TNF related protein (CTRP) family, a family of adipokines
