= John Kwedhi =

Namibian trade unionist

- Born: John Kwedhi; Onayena, Namibia
- Other names: Natangwe
- Occupation: Trade unionist
- Known for: Worker's rights

John Kwedhi is a Namibian trade unionist. He is the secretary general of the Namibia Transport and Allied Workers Union (NATAU) an organisation founded on 5 June 1989 under the umbrella body of the National Union of Namibian Workers (NUNW).

Kwedhi is considered a new breed of unionist, that more than compromising workers' interest to be politically complacent with the power structures, maintains an outspoken approach on the many polemic issues that affect the workers.

He is married to Esther Gideon. They have a son, Ndalipale Kwedhi.
