= NTUC =

NTUC may mean:

- National Trade Unions Confederation, national trade union center in Mauritius.
- National Trades Union Congress, a national trade union centre in Singapore.
  - NTUC Downtown East, an entertainment hub located in Pasir Ris, Singapore.
  - NTUC FairPrice, a Singaporean supermarket chain.
- National Trade Union Confederation (Cambodia), a trade union federation in Cambodia.
- Nepal Trade Union Congress, a national trade union center in Nepal.
- Nigeria Trade Union Congress, a former national trade union federation in Nigeria.
