= Kamal Abu Eita =

Egyptian labor activist

Kamal Abu-Eita
- كمال أبو عيطة
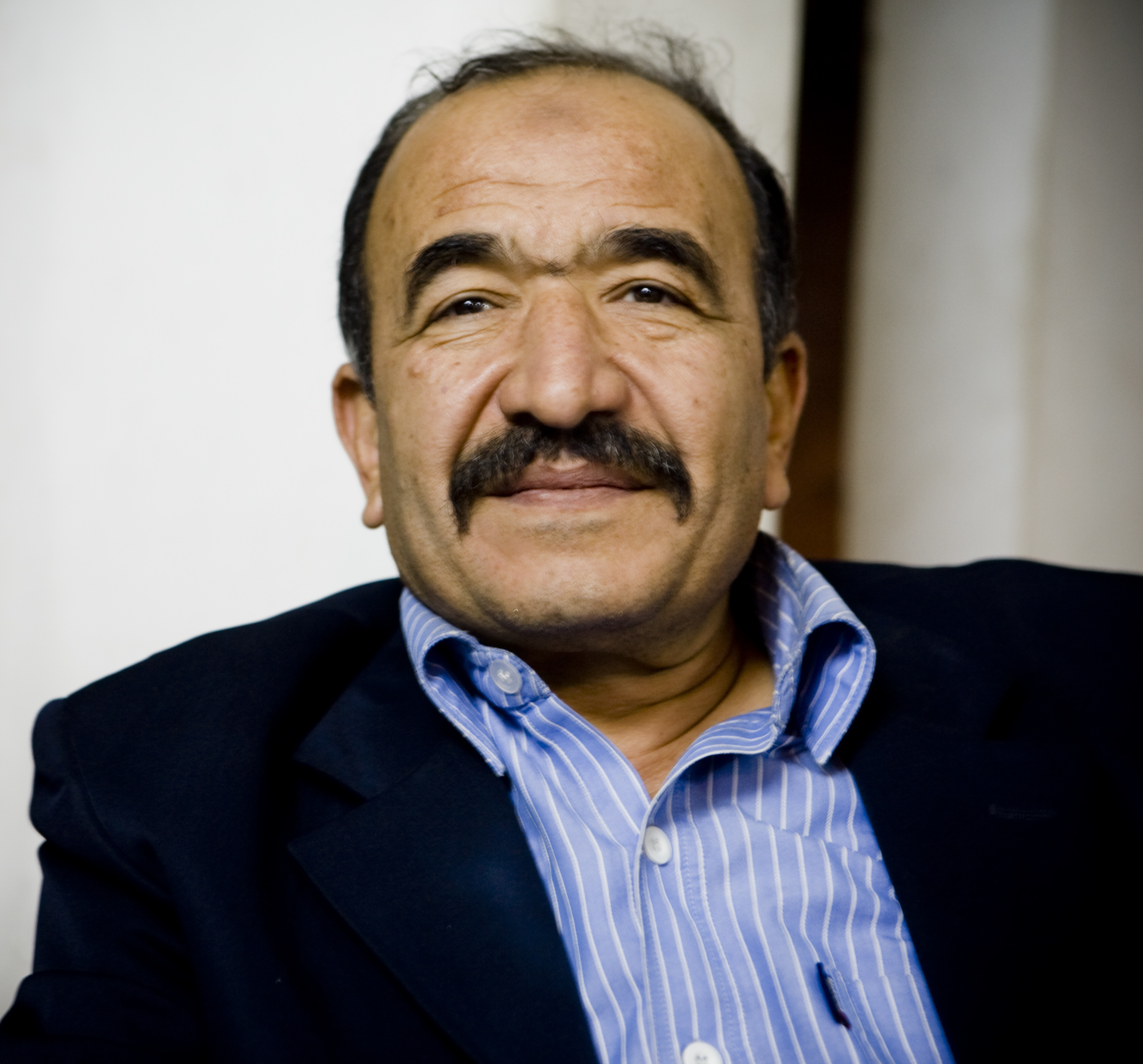

Minister of Manpower and Immigration
- In office 16 July 2013 – 1 March 2014

Personal details
- Born: March 1, 1953 (age 73)
- Party: Dignity Party

Kamal Abu Eita (also spelled Abu 'Ayta; Arabic: كمال أبو عيطة) is a long-time Egyptian trade unionist and former government minister. As a civil servant at the Real Estate Tax Authority, Abu Eita led a successful struggle for trade union autonomy against the state-controlled Egyptian Trade Union Federation (ETUF) during the Mubarak regime. A prominent figure during the 2011 Egyptian Revolution he helped found the country's first independent union confederation, the Egyptian Federation of Independent Trade Unions (EFITU). Elected to the People's Assembly following the democratic parliamentary election of 2011-12, Abu-Eita served as Minister of Manpower and Immigration between July 2013 and March 2014.

== Pre-January 25 Revolution ==
As a long-time activist, he organized labor movements and led the challenge against the state-affiliated Egyptian Trade Union Federation. In 2007, he led major strikes and sit-ins outside the Ministry of Manpower - the institution he would lead six years later.

He was active in supporting the January 25th revolution. For several years he was a member of the outlawed Nasserist Dignity Party. He represented the party as an MP after being elected in 2011, having run as a member of the FJP-affiliated Democratic Alliance for Egypt.

== Post-January 25 ==
He gained notoriety for helping to establish the Real Estate Tax Authority Independent General Union in 2009 - the country’s first independent trade union. The move was aggressively rejected by the state-tied Egyptian Trade Union Federation.

=== Egyptian Federation of Independent Trade Unions (EFITU) ===
While a senior leader of the EFITU, the CTUWS decided to withdraw from the union. By October 2011 the CTUWS and 148 other unions established the EDLC. In the 2014, the EDLC and EFITU are estimated to represent nearly two million Egyptian workers.

=== Minister of Manpower ===
Abu-Eita was originally appointed Minister of Manpower during the 2012 Morsi Cabinet. His appointment was aggressively rejected by the ETUF, viewing him as animus towards the group.

Upon being nominated to the ministry, he announced that his primary objective as minister would be promoting the long-sought minimum wage law. The law would raise public sector salaries from a minimum of £E700 to £E1,200 per month.

Only month after being appointed Minister, security forces crushed a strike at the Suez Steel Company. Abu Eita reportedly did not comment on the issue. Members of the EFITU executive committee would later complain about Abu Eita's committing the union to abandoning "the strike weapon" at times, without consultation. In this way, he was seen as instrumentalizing the independent union rather than representing its interests.

=== Political views ===
Responding to reports that he advocated the teaching of capitalism, Abu-Eita said "I am a Nasserist and I do not support capitalism."

Abu-Eita was co-founder of the Nasserist Dignity Party.
