= Surat Alley =

Indian trade unionist and political activist

Bansidhar Misra aka Surat Alley (1905–1988), was an Indian trade unionist and political activist in Britain who campaigned for civil rights of Indians.

== Early life ==
Born on 18 May 1905 in the village of Khandasahi, Kendrapara District, Odisha State to a Hindu Brahmin jamindar family, he originally had the name Banshidhar Mishra before he later changed it. He was influenced by Gopabandhu Das, a participant in the non-cooperation movement.

He and Rajakrishna Bose assumed leadership during the youth movement in Odisha in the late 1920s. In order to raise awareness among them, he established "Youth Committees" in several locations. He also published many provocative articles in the newspaper Yubak, which aroused the ire of the British authorities. A warrant for his arrest had been issued, but he managed to get away by travelling to Burma in disguise, where he joined the Burmese uprising. From that point on, he changed his name to "Surat Alley," and from 1932 to 1952, he went by that name.

== Life in the United Kingdom ==
He travelled to London, where he started campaigning for the rights of Indians, particularly lascars, whilst living in London’s East End. The total number of colonial seamen on British Merchant vessels in the 1930s amounted to nearly 235,000, of which 10% were Indian. He took up the responsibility of lascar politics after Sophia Duleep Singh and Shapurji Saklatvala had led the way.

He co-founded and was Secretary of the Colonial Seamen’s Association, whilst Chris Braithwaite was President, which formed in 1935 in reaction to the British Shipping (Assistance) Act. Alley recalled the CSA "started at the time when Italian fascism threat [to] attack Abyssinia. The Association was the expression of the discontent existing among the colonial seamen and its aim was to redress their grievances".

He was also the London representative of Aftab Ali’s All-India Seamen's Federation. In this role, he aided lobbied on behalf of striking lascars. When After the strike was called off, Alley continued to lobby the Home Secretary and calling on the Trades Union Congress to get the workers released from prison and restore them to their jobs. Before his arrest in 1940, he may have been an associate of Udham Singh, who was a member of the Indian Workers' Association.

In 1939, he organised the Indian Workers Conference in London.

During his time in the United Kingdom he was in contact with N. G. Ranga, Feroze Gandhi, Krishna Menon, and Siddhartha Shankar Ray.

In 1945, representing the FIAGB, he attended the Fifth Pan-African Congress in Manchester drawing comparisons between Indian and his fellow African seamen. The event was attended by many notable attendees including Kwame Nkrumah, Tikiri Banda Subasinghe and W. E. B. Du Bois. He sought to directly link anti-colonialism and maritime labour. His message to congress was "as long as there is one man oppressed the whole of the Indian nation feels oppressed: so long as there is one man who is not emancipated, I do not feel that I am emancipated".

== Returning to India and personal life ==
He was married to Sarah (Sally) Reder. He returned to India in 1952. Despite being offered a role by the Indian National Congress, he became a teacher, founding a primary school in his village Khandasahi. His younger brother Srinibas Mishra was Member of Parliament from Cuttack Lok Sabha Constituency in 1967. He died in August 1988.

== Notes ==
He is documented as Soorat and as Ali/Ally within some of the literature.
