= Aftab Ali =

Bengali social reformer, politician and entrepreneur (1907–1972)

- আফতাব আলী

Member of the Bengal Legislative Assembly
- In office 1937–1945
- Succeeded by: Abdul Motaleb Malik
- Constituency: Water Transport Trade Union

Member of the 3rd National Assembly of Pakistan
- In office 1962–1965
- Succeeded by: Mahmud Ali
- Constituency: Sylhet-I

Personal details
- Born: 20 January 1907 Kathalkhair, Balaganj/Bishwanath, Sylhet District, North-East Frontier, British Raj
- Died: 22 December 1972 (aged 65) London, United Kingdom
- Resting place: Brookwood Cemetery, Brookwood, Surrey
- Citizenship: United Kingdom
- Party: All-India Trade Union Congress
- Spouse: Ayesha Ali
- Children: Shareef Ali
- Relatives: KC Choudhury, Rechelle Ali (granddaughter), Quinn Bullas, Ava Bullas (great granddaughters)
- Occupation: Businessman, social worker, president, politician
- Known for: Founding the All-India Seamen's Federation
- Monuments: Aftab Terrace, London, E1
- Movement: Indian Seamen's Union

Aftab Ali (Bengali: আফতাব আলী; 1907–1972) was an early 20th-century Pakistani Bengali social reformer, politician and entrepreneur. His work is recognised to have helped thousands of British Asian lascars to migrate, settle and find employment in Britain. He was a member of the Bengal Legislative Assembly and National Assembly of Pakistan, and served as the first Minister of Labour for East Pakistan.

== Early life ==
Ali was born into a Bengali Muslim family from the Kathalkhair village of the Sylhet District in the British Raj's North-East Frontier on 20 January 1907. His father was a merchant on the Sylhet-Calcutta water route, owning a number of boats. At the age of 18, Ali left Sylhet Government School in class 10 moving to Calcutta where he worked alongside Bipin Chandra Pal.

== Career ==
In 1923, Ali left Calcutta as a stoker on a ship bound for the United States. There he jumped ship, seeking employment, education, and experience. He returned to Bengal in 1925, having been exposed to trade unionism and politics in the US, and with first hand experience of the poor working conditions of Indian seamen. This experience led to the foundations of his social work for the rights of South Asian lascars.

In 1925, Ali joined the Indian Seamen's Union in Calcutta and eventually rose to become the organisation's general secretary. In January 1937, Ali united all of the various unions (namely the Indian Quartermaster's Union, Bengal Mariner's Union, Seamen's Welfare League of India and Karachi Seamen's Union) under one large federation known as the All-India Seamen's Federation. Ali also joined the Bengal Legislative Assembly in that year, following the 1937 Indian provincial elections.

During a visit to London in 1933 for the Round Table Conference, not only did he represent the interests of Indian seamen but also Indian labourers, film-extras and peddlers in the United Kingdom. Ali arrived at the United Kingdom in July 1939, spending a month in the country. He attended Surat Alley's Indian Workers' Conference in London. Ali appointed Alley as the London representative for his federation. Ali also had a good relationship with Krishna Menon and was invited by Menon to the Glasgow Trades Council meeting on 23 August.

He was also invited to another meeting by Benjamin Francis Bradley in Manchester with some Trade Union executives. Ali was also known to have visited Dundee before proceeding off to Switzerland with Faiz Ahmad Faiz and Abdul Mannan Chaudhury for the International Labour Conference in Geneva where he put forward the proposal for a 56-hour week at sea and a 48-hour week at port balance for Indian seamen. As World War II approached Britain, Ali, Alley and Tahsil Miya played crucial roles in breaking the deadlock between British ship-owners and Asian lascars. Rallies were organised with lascars striking against their unequal treatment in income and working conditions. Finally reaching an agreement with the British government, Ali called off the strikes. However, the federation continued to campaign in other fields such as the release and re-employment of imprisoned lascars. They lobbied the Home Secretary, Samuel Hoare, and called on the Trades Union Congress in Glasgow for support.

On his return to Bengal, Ali became the vice president of the All-India Trade Union Congress and continued his role in the Bengal Legislative Assembly. He managed to persuade Abdul Motaleb Malik to join the All-India Seamen's Federation in 1936. In 1941, he left the All-India Trade Union Congress. The following year, the Royal Indian Navy appointed him as honorary lieutenant commander. Ali had close connections with the Indian Seamen's Welfare League led by Shah Abdul Majid Qureshi and Ayub Ali Master.

Following the Partition of India in 1947, Ali moved to East Bengal in Pakistan and became an independent Member of Parliament. He was not a supporter of partition. His social work for British Asian lascars continued, and he encouraged lascars to remain and settle in the United Kingdom. In the 1950s, he founded the Overseas Seamen's Welfare Association, which campaigned for distressed seamen and their families to be granted British passports. Ali also played an instrumental role by opening a passport office in his house in Sylhet. He was a colleague of Huseyn Shaheed Suhrawardy.

He attended the International Labour Conference hosted in Geneva in 1951, and in Havana in 1953. Ali visited Soviet Georgia in 1957. The following year, he visited Ceylon where he was invited to the International Confederation of Free Trade Unions conference. The following year he was part of an Indian Labour delegation to Indonesia. He became the first Minister of Labour for East Pakistan and member of the 3rd National Assembly of Pakistan. During this time, he lived in Mirboxtula. As part of a Labour delegation, he visited China in 1964.

== Death and legacy ==
Ali died on 22 December 1972 while in London. He was buried in Brookwood Cemetery. A housing estate was built in 1995 on Tent Street (off Brady Street, East London) and named after him as Aftab Terrace.

== See also ==
- British Shipping (Assistance) Act 1935
- I'tisam-ud-Din
- All Pakistan Confederation of Labour
