= CGTP =

CGTP may refer to:

- cyclic guanosine triphosphate
- Confederación General de Trabajadores de Panamá, the General Confederation of Workers of Panama
- Confederação Geral dos Trabalhadores Portugueses, the General Confederation of the Portuguese Workers
- Confederación General de Trabajadores del Perú
- current Good Tissue Practices
