= General Federation of Jordanian Trade Unions =

GFJTU
- General Federation of Jordanian Trade Unions
- Founded: 1954
- Headquarters: Amman, Jordan
- Location: Jordan
- Members: 200,000
- Key people: Mazen Al-Maayta
- Affiliations: ITUC

The General Federation of Jordanian Trade Unions (GFJTU) is the national trade union center in Jordan. It was founded in 1954.

With a membership of 135,000 the GFJTU as of 2019, the GFJTU is the sole trade union center in the country with 17 affiliated unions, although affiliation is not mandatory.

The GFJTU is affiliated with the International Trade Union Confederation. The General Federation of Labour Trade Unions is a member of other Arab and International Confederations as well, including the International Confederation of Arab Trade Unions.

== History ==
The GFJTU was established in 1954 through the initiative of six Jordanian Labour trade unions. Their aim was to reinforce the Jordanian Labour Movement, as well as to encourage workers to join trade unions.

The General Federation grew from 23 unions in 1957 to 29 unions in 1967, out of a total of 40 at the time.

As of 2019, the trade union membership rate in GFJTU was declining significantly during the last two decades from 230,000 in 2001 to 135,000 in 2019, which equals a fall of 41%.

== Leadership and structure ==
The current leadership of the GFJTU is as follows:

- President: Mazen Ma’aytah
- Managing Board: Vice President: Jamil Abdul Rahim
- Secretary for Financial Affairs: Khaled Abu Mrjob
- Secretary for External Relations: Haidar Rashid
- Secretary of Culture and Media: Mahmoud Hiyari
- Secretary for occupational health and safety: Mohammed Ghanem
- Secretary for Women and Youth Affairs: Hammam Maaytah
- Members: Ahmad Abu Khadra, Ali Al-Haded, Fathallah Al-Amrani, Yousf Qanab, Mahmoud Maaytah, Ibrahim Abu Rgeh, Mohammed Al-Zubi, Khalid Zyoud, Khaled Fanatsah, Mahmoud Batosh

The election period is every five years.

The GFJTU is made up of three organizations: The General Conference, The Central Council, and The Executive Committee. The General Conference, per its charter, is the authority specialized in the formulation of GFJTU policies. During the periods between convening conferences, the Central Council becomes the highest authority. Finally, the Executive Committee, which consists of one representative from each trade union, is the de facto authority of the Federation.

The leadership and structure is set out in the Charter of the Federation.

== Controversies ==
The GFJTU has been criticized by independent unions and by labor rights activists for having "unified, non-democratic and centralized by-laws that are imposed on all trade unions and their general federation". Additionally, the leadership of the GFJTU has been criticized for rejecting proposals for reform that would make the power structure of the organization more democratic. The GFJTU has been described as a "semi-governmental institution" due to being fully financed by the government and the Social Security Corporation. Membership in affiliate unions and therefore membership in the GFJTU is mandatory for thousands of Jordanian workers.

In 2013, following the Arab Spring and waves of labor protests, nine unions got together to found the Federation of Independent Trade Unions of Jordan (FITU-J) as an alternative to the official General Federation of Jordanian Trade Unions. The General Federation of Jordanian Trade Unions (GFJTU) and affiliate trade unions issued multiple statements declaring that the independent trade unions are illegal and illegitimate.

== Trade unions in Jordan ==
There are some associations and syndicates in Jordan which are not recognized through the mechanisms laid out in Jordanian labor law, and are therefore not affiliated with the GFJTU and are not referred to as "Trade unions." There are over 16 professional associations in Jordan. These include:

- Jordanian Engineers Association
- Jordan Medical Association
- Jordan Bar Association
- Jordan Beekeeping Association
- Jordan Agricultural Engineers Association
- Jordan Dental Association
- Jordan Nurses and Midwives Council
- Jordan Press Association
- Jordan Geologists Association
- Jordan Pharmacist Association
- Economic & Social Association of Retired Servicemen & veterans (ESARSV) of Hashemite Kingdom of Jordan
- Jordan teachers syndicate
- Jordanian Writers Association
- Jordanian Plastic Artist Association (not to be confused for a professional association for plastic surgeon)
- Jordanian Construction Contractors Association
- Jordan Association of Certified Public Accountants

These professional associations are not formally recognized as trade unions under Jordan Labor Law.

The 17 trade unions affiliated with the GFJTU are the following:

1. The General Union of Construction Workers
2. The General Union of Petroleum and Chemicals Employees
3. The General Trade Union of Municipality Employees
4. The General Union of Private Education Employees
5. The General Union of Public Services and Free Professions Employees
6. The General Union of Health Services Employees
7. The General Union of Railway Employees
8. The General Union of Food Industry Employees
9. The General Trade Union of Printing, Photography, and Paper Employees
10. The General Trade Union of Textile Industry
11. The General Trade Union of Electricity Employees
12. The General Trade Union of the Employees of Banks, Insurance, and Auditing
13. The General Trade Union of Mines and Mining Employees
14. The General Trade Union of Commercial Stores Employees
15. The General Trade Union of Ports and Clearance Employees
16. The General Trade Union of Air Transport and Tourism Employees
17. The General Trade Union of Land Transport Employees and Mechanics

There are also independent trade unions in Jordan. There are six independent trade unions:

1. The Independent Trade Union for Workers in Phosphate
2. The Independent Trade Union for Workers in the Jordanian Electricity Company
3. The Independent Trade Union for Workers in Printing Press
4. The Independent Trade Union for Workers in Municipalities
5. The Independent Trade Union for Workers in Agriculture

In 2013, these trade unions announced the formation of their own Independent Trade Union Federation according to democratic by-laws.

== Sources ==
- ICTUR; et al., eds. (2005). Trade Unions of the World (6th ed.). London, UK: John Harper Publishing. ISBN 0-9543811-5-7.
