= National Labour Congress =

NLC
- National Labour Congress
- Founded: 1994
- Headquarters: Kingstown
- Location: Saint Vincent and the Grenadines
- Key people: Cecil 'Pa' Jack, President

The National Labour Congress (NLC) is the sole national trade union centre of Saint Vincent and the Grenadines. The affiliated unions of the NLC are: Commercial, Technical and Allied Workers Union, the St. Vincent and the Grenadines Teachers' Union, Public Service Union, the National Workers Movement (NWM), the LIAT Workers' Union, the Windward Islands Farmers' Association, the Nurses' Association and the Medical Association.

== See also ==
- List of trade unions
- List of federations of trade unions
