= Kala Gujran =

Kala Gujran کالا گوجراں
- Union Council and Town
- Kala Gujran
- Nickname: Kala Gujran
- Location in Pakistan
- Coordinates: 33°10′48″N 72°57′59″E
- Country: Pakistan
- Province: Punjab
- District: Jhelum
- Tehsil: Jhelum
- Time zone: UTC+5 (PST)
  - Summer (DST): +6

Kala Gujran (in Punjabi کالا گوجراں) is a town and union council of Jhelum District in the Punjab Province of Pakistan. It is part of Jhelum Tehsil, and is located at 33°10'48N 72°57'59E with an altitude of 467 metres (1535 feet).

Kala Gujran is near Jhelum City. It is home to two major mosques, Jamia Masjid Chaudrian & Jamia Masjid Gujran on Ch Ghulam Ahmad Road. A cigarette factory of Pakistan Tobacco Company is situated here. There is a small industrial estate with around 80 small factories. Until its recent decline, the Fauji Mill complex was a major employer in the area. It used to produce cloth for export and distribution nationally.

Pakistan national motorway 2 named G.T. Road (General Trunk Road) passes through the town. There are two major bus stops, named Phatik and Kala Mor. The Rescue 1122 office is also situated there.

== History ==
Kala Gujran is located on the route of the old GT road and predates the city of Jhelum in its importance. It has been a significant market town and Gujjar stronghold since ancients times with the Hindu and then the Sikhs rulers leaving relics in the old bazaar.

In particular the area surrounding the old school has lakes locally known as the five sisters, so called as they drained into each other with five pippal trees planted in line. There were five ancient Hindu temples (mandirs) on the site, abandoned and subsequently destroyed during Partition. The leading temple had a traceable tunnel leading directly to a covered "kooh" (Persian water wheel irrigation system in an outpost agricultural settlement) on the town's northbound outskirts, along the Chak Jamal Rd. This was reputedly run by a powerful courtesan presumably to afford safe passage for the chieftains or priests during times of conflict. There are reports of some local "koohs" having tablets of stone at the bottom with carvings dating back hundreds of years.

There are also planted Sacred Fig (Ficus religiosa) "Pippal" trees in a line going from Kala Gujran up to what is now known as the Mangla Fort affording an identifiable safe route passage to the fort at Mangla also known as Ramkot. It is not known if the passages could be traced from Rohtas or Tilla Jogian to Mangla forts but part of it most definitely passes from Kala Gujran to Mangla. In Tilla Jogian and ancient Ramkot (now Mangla) there are also similar lakes or tanks that drain into each other. The elders and historian bards of the Kala Gujran locale speak of people including in recent times having their ears pierced in line with what has been happening in the Tilla Jogian and Kala Gujran areas for centuries. The lakes and the school are currently in a neglected state and the mandirs have gone with the only trace left being a few marble floor tiles. The Gujjars of the area have variously been described as a problematic but powerful tribe in particular the Tikri Gujjar clan. There are references to the Tikkri Gujjars being an important tribe in the area and beyond with towns and regions named after the tribe.

There were significant Sikh and Muslim Gujjars from this area leading in the nearby Battle of Chillianwala, fought during the Second Anglo-Sikh War in the Chillianwala region of Punjab. The battle was one of the bloodiest fought by the British East India Company. It was a strategic check to immediate British ambitions in India and a shock to British military prestige. The British were defeated. They returned however with numerous reinforcements and carried out wholesale massacres in the city of Gujrat. They subsequently set up a battalion in Jhelum and named it "the city of soldiers"

The Battle of the Hydaspes River was fought by Alexander the Great in 326 BC against the Hindu King Porus (Pururava in Sanskrit) on the banks of the Hydaspes River (Jhelum River). In those days Kala Gujran would have been the favoured large city in the area. The Paurava kingdom of King Porus was situated here and many elite trained personnel would have been conscripted from Kala Gujran or Kamboja. The Hydaspes was the last major and most costly battle fought by Alexander.[15] King Porus and his Tikri Gujjar men put up strong resistance against the invading Macedonian army which caused them to be admired and respected by Alexander.[16] Although victorious, Alexander's exhausted army mutinied soon after, when he made plans to cross river Hydaspes (Beas River), and refused to go further into India.

Ancient vedic texts describe the area as being part of Kamboja kingdom, dominated by Hun warrior classes excelling at hand-to-hand combat, horsemanship and a mercenary attitude. The war horses of Kamboja were famous through all periods of Indian History. In the battle fought on the fields of Kurukshetra, the fastest and powerful horses of Kamboja were of greatest service. There is mention that the people were distinctly different from the rest of the kingdom in their appearance, stature, physical prowess, dress religious beliefs and practises, further reference and conjecture to the Huns or Aryan theories as described in history. There are also cross references with ancient and recent historical battles and notable individuals with direct lineage to the Gujjar Tikkri clans.

The Gujjars were once the most influential group and chieftains of Kala Gujran (hence the name). The British when they did take over the region did not allow the Gujjars to join the military or civil service citing them as unreliable, unfit and associated very strongly to the criminal and mercenary Thuggee gangs, going so far as to criminalise them with the introduction of Criminal Tribes Act of 1871. However, the area is famously known as the land of martyrs and warriors and many specialised as mercenary fighters. When it was eventually repealed and the Gujjars were allowed to join the ranks they were instrumental during the 1857 uprisings, the Indian mutiny.

During subsequent periods the Gujjars in this area did not take advantage of the political process being easily manipulated by puppet regimes instilled by the colonial British rulers to tactfully divide and rule the princely states.

== Notable people ==
The following notable individuals were born in this town;

- Inder Kumar Gujral, former Prime Minister of India
- Lieutenant General Jagjit Singh Aurora of the Indian Army
- Mirza Ibrahim, politician and trade union leader
- Subedar Noor Dad Khan of the Royal Army Service Corps
