= Guyana Trades Union Congress =

Trade union in Guyana

GTUC
- Guyana Trades Union Congress
- Founded: 1941
- Headquarters: Georgetown, Guyana
- Location: Guyana
- Members: 22 unions
- Key people: Lincoln Lewis, general secretary Carvil Duncan, president
- Affiliations: ITUC

The Guyana Trades Union Congress is a national trade union center in Guyana. It was founded in 1941 as the British Guiana Trades Union Council. It is affiliated with the International Trade Union Confederation.

== See also ==
- List of trade unions
- List of federations of trade unions
