= Namibia Food and Allied Workers Union =

Trade union in Namibia

NAFAU
- Namibia Food and Allied Workers Union
- "An injury to one is an injury to all"
- Founded: 20 September 1986
- Headquarters: NUNW Center, Katutura, Windhoek, Namibia
- Location: Namibia
- Members: 15,000 (2020, self-reported)
- Key people: Mike Karupu, President; Jacob Penda, General secretary
- Affiliations: National Union of Namibian Workers
- Website: www.nafau.org.na

The Namibia Food and Allied Workers Union (NAFAU) is a trade union in Namibia affiliated with the National Union of Namibian Workers (NUNW). In 2020 it had a self-reported membership of 15,000. NAFAU's organizational strongholds include the fishing industries around Walvis Bay and Lüderitz.

== History ==
NAFAU was founded on 20 September 1986. Originally led by the late politician, trade unionist and political prisoner John Pandeni, the Union was the first NUNW-affiliated industrial union in Namibia.
