= Namibia Financial Institutions Union =

Trade union in Namibia

NAFINU
- Namibian Financial Institutions Union
- Headquarters: Windhoek, Namibia
- Location: Namibia
- Members: 4,500
- Key people: Asnath Zamuee, secretary general
- Affiliations: NUNW

The Namibian Financial Institutions Union (Nafinu) is a trade union in Namibia, representing workers in the financial sector. It has its headquarters in Windhoek. It is affiliated with the National Union of Namibian Workers, the Namibian national trade union centre close to SWAPO, Namibia's ruling political party.
