= John Pandeni Constituency =

Electoral constituency in the Khomas region of central Namibia

Coordinates: 22°33′S 17°3′E

John Pandeni constituency (red) in the Khomas Region

John Pandeni constituency, formerly known as Soweto, is an electoral constituency in the Khomas Region of Namibia. In 2008, it was renamed after John Pandeni, a member of the South West Africa People's Organization (SWAPO) and its militant wing, the People's Liberation Army of Namibia (PLAN). Pandeni was the first regional councillor for the former Soweto constituency and the first governor of Khomas. This constituency is inside the city of Windhoek in the formerly all-Black suburb of Katutura. It had a population of 15,121 in 2011, up from 13,865 in 2001. As of 2020, it has 14,758 registered voters.

== Politics ==
John Pandeni Constituency is traditionally a stronghold of the South West Africa People's Organization (SWAPO) party. In the 2004 regional election, SWAPO candidate Rakel Jacob received 2.079 of the 3,080 votes cast and became councillor. In the 2015 regional election SWAPO also won by a landslide. Jakob was reelected with 2,996 votes, followed by Steve Kevanhu of the Rally for Democracy and Progress (RDP, 375 votes).

The SWAPO candidate also won the 2020 regional election, albeit by a much smaller margin. Shaalukeni Moonde received 1,696 votes, followed by Abraham Nakantinda of the Independent Patriots for Change (IPC), an opposition party formed in August 2020, with 827 votes and Duminga Ndala of the Landless People's Movement (LPM, also a new party, registered in 2018) with 825 votes.
