= Commonwealth of the Bahamas Trade Union Congress =

CBTUC
- Commonwealth of the Bahamas Trade Union Congress
- Founded: 1976
- Headquarters: Nassau, New Providence
- Location: The Bahamas
- Key people: Obie Ferguson Jr., president Timothy Moore, secretary general
- Affiliations: ITUC

Commonwealth of the Bahamas Trade Union Congress is a central trade union federation in The Bahamas.

Leadership:

- President: Obie Ferguson Jr.
- General Secretary: Tyrone Morris

== See also ==
- List of trade unions
- List of federations of trade unions
