= Namibia Nurses Union =

Trade union in Namibia

- Abbreviation: NANU
- Formation: 1999
- Founded at: Windhoek
- Type: Trade Union
- Headquarters: Windhoek, Namibia
- Services: Representing Namibian Nurses
- President: Shopati Abner
- Secretary General: Timoteus Gerbhard
- Treasurer General: Eliud Shiwayu

The Namibia Nurses Union (NANU) is a Namibian trade union formed in 1999 to represent Namibian Nurses. NANU is one of a number of breakaway unions from the Public Workers' Union (Napwu).

In 2020, the Union, through its acting Secretary General Junias Shilunga gave a memorandum to start a student union aimed at representing the plights of nursing students across Namibia.

== See also ==
- Trade Union Congress of Namibia
