= John Pandeni =

Namibian politician and trade unionist

John Alphons Pandeni (30 July 1950 – 14 March 2008) was a Namibian politician and trade unionist as well as a member of SWAPO party. Pandeni was Minister of Regional and Local Government, Housing and Rural Development at the time of his death in 2008.

== Early life ==
Pandeni was born in the village of Omundjalala in the Omusati Region of northern Namibia. After receiving military training in Tanzania and Angola, Pandeni was arrested in 1978 for anti-apartheid military activities with SWAPO's military wing, the People's Liberation Army of Namibia. He remained imprisoned on Robben Island until 1985. After his release, Pandeni became the founding Secretary of the Namibia Food and Allied Workers Union (Nafau) until 1992. In that year he entered politics, serving as Regional Councillor for Soweto constituency in Katutura, Windhoek. A year later he became the Khomas Regional Governor until 2005 when he entered President Hifikepunye Pohamba's first cabinet. He was a distant relative of fellow Robben Island prisoner turned SWAPO politician Petrus Iilonga.

== Legacy ==
He is named after a constituency within the City of Windhoek boundaries, John Pandeni Constituency. Pandeni is buried alongside other former liberation leaders at Heroes' Acre, outside of Windhoek, the Namibian capital.

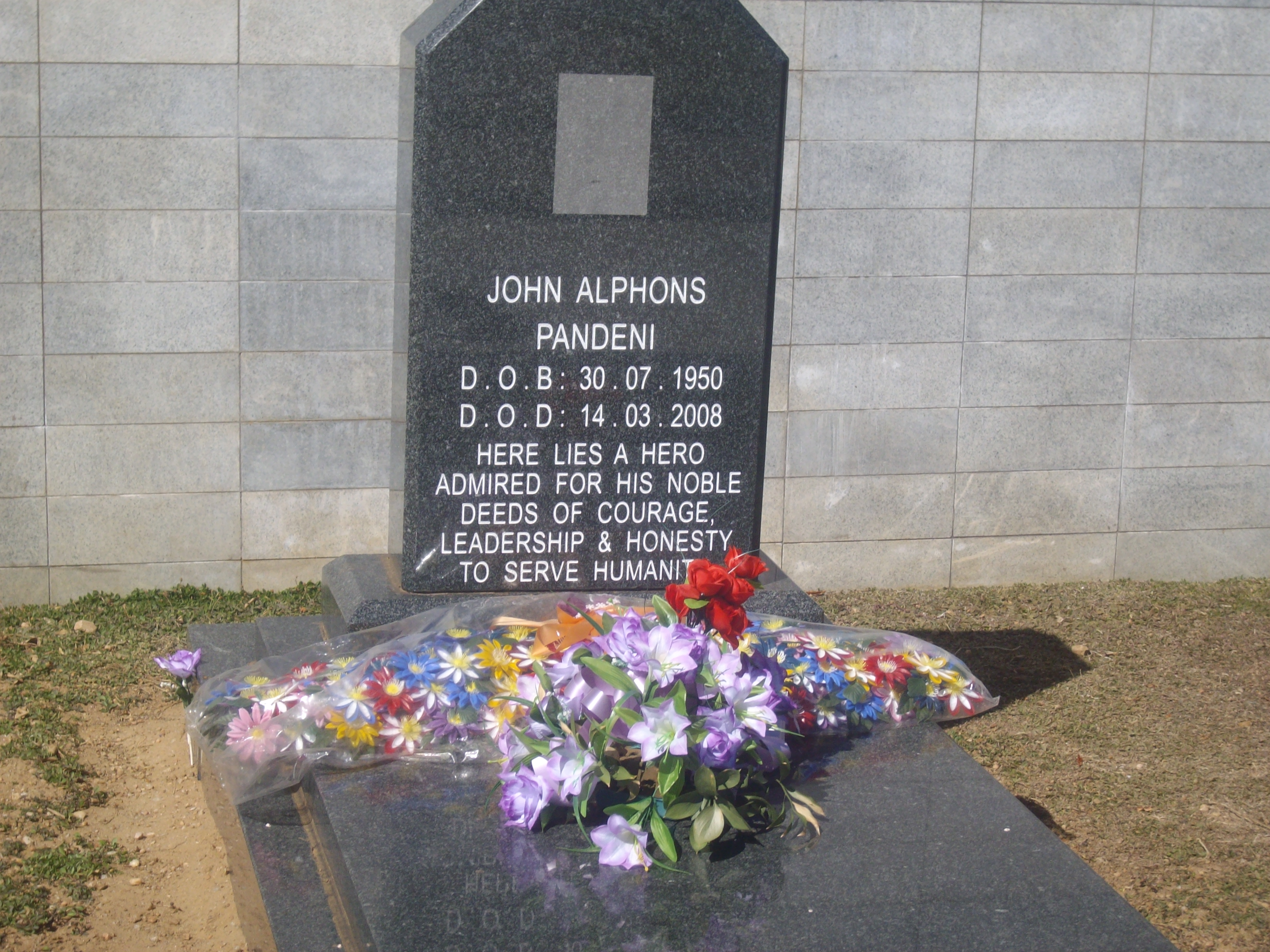
John Pandeni's gravesite at the national war memorial, Heroes' Acre
