= National Trade Union Congress of Belize =

NTUCB
- National Trade Union Congress of Belize
- Founded: 1966
- Headquarters: Queen Elizabeth II Boulevard Belmopan, Belize
- Location: Belize
- General Secretary: Timothy Dami
- Key people: Ella Waight, President
- Affiliations: ITUC, CCL
- Website: ntucb.org

The National Trade Union Congress of Belize is a central trade union representing workers in Belize. The NTUCB is affiliated to the International Trade Union Confederation and the Caribbean Congress of Labor. The NTUCB is an umbrella organization for twelve unions in Belize. These include:

- Association of Public Service Senior Managers - President Sis Sharon Fraser (2022)
- Belize Communication Workers Union - President Bro Jermaine Williams (2022)
- Belize Energy Workers Union - President Bro Jose Escalera (2022)
- Belize Workers Union - President Bro Ramiro Gongora (2022)
- Belize National Teachers Union - President Sis Elena Smith (2022)
- Belize Water Services Workers Union - President Bro Douglas Yorke (2022)
- Christian Workers' Union - President Bro Evan 'Mose' Hyde (2022)
- Karl Heusner Memorial Hospital Authority Workers Union - President Bro Andrew Baird (2022)
- Public Service Union of Belize - President Bro Dean Flowers (2022)
- Southern Workers' Union - President Glenn Lewis (2022)
- Belize Progressive Teachers' Union - President Bro Aldo Novelo (2022)
- University of Belize Faculty and Staff Union -

== See also ==
- List of trade unions
- List of federations of trade unions
