= National Trade Unions' Federation =

NTUF
- National Trade Unions’ Federation
- Founded: 1972
- Location: Libya
- Key people: Abdalla Idriss, General Secretary
- Affiliations: WFTU, ICATU

The National Trade Unions’ Federation (NTUF) is the sole national trade union center in Libya. It was formed in 1972 and is closely associated with the Libyan regime of Muammar al-Gaddafi.

ICTUR reports that:

No strikes have been reported for many years. According to the government, workers may strike but do not need to because they control their enterprises. External sources, however, reject this assessment.

The NTUF is affiliated with the World Federation of Trade Unions.
