= Namibia Transport and Allied Workers' Union =

NATAU
- Namibia Transport and Allied Workers Union
- Founded: June 1989
- Headquarters: Keetmanshoop, Namibia
- Location: Namibia
- Key people: John Kwedhi, general secretary
- Affiliations: National Union of Namibian Workers

The Namibia Transport and Allied Workers Union (NATAU) is a trade union in Namibia. Founded in Keetmanshoop in June 1989, NATAU is an affiliate of the National Union of Namibian Workers (NUNW) and the International Transport Workers' Federation.
