= National Congress of Trade Unions =

National Congress of Trade Unions of The Bahamas
- National Congress of Trade Unions
- Abbreviation: NCTUB
- Headquarters: Nassau, New Providence
- Key people: Patrick Bain, president Robert Farquharson, general secretary

National Congress of Trade Unions is a central trade union federation in the Bahamas. It was founded by Dr. Leroy "Duke" Hanna on 10 November 1995.

== See also ==
- List of trade unions
- List of federations of trade unions
