= Public Service Union of Namibia =

PSUN
- Public Service Union of Namibia
- Founded: 1990 (1981)
- Location: Namibia
- Members: 23,000
- Key people: Matheus Haakuria, secretary general Paulus Titus Sitentu, president
- Affiliations: TUCNA
- Website: www.psun.com.na

The Public Service Union of Namibia (PSUN) is a trade union representing 23,000 public sector workers in Namibia. Originally founded as a multiracial association in March 1981 as the Government Service Staff Association (GSSA) due to restrictions on trade unionism during the period of South African control of Namibia. The union adopted its present name in November 1990.
