= General Confederation of Civil Servants =

The General Confederation of Civil Servants (French: Confédération Générale de la Fonction Publique, CGFP) is a trade union representing public sector workers in Luxembourg.

The union was established in 1967, by the Professional Union of the Public Force, the National Union of Teachers, the Entente des Cadres and the Professional Association of the Public Service. The four associations had recently split from the General Association of Civil Servants in the Grand Duchy of Luxembourg (AGF). The AGF dissolved in 1970, and most of its remaining members then joined the CGFP. Initially, the new union focused on organising middle managers, but it expanded across all areas of the government, including schoolteachers, by prioritising protecting the salaries and working conditions of its members. As of 1990, it had 15,000 members.

In 1990, the union was a founder of the European Confederation of Independent Trade Unions. It worked closely with the General Federation of the Municipal Administration. By 2015, the CGFP was able to win 21 out of 27 seats in the Chamber of Civil Servants and Public Employees.
