= Nepal Inclusive Trade Union Federation =

Trade union centre in Nepal

NITUF
- Nepal Inclusive Trade Union Federation
- Founded: 2006
- Headquarters: Kathmandu, Nepal
- Location: Nepal
- Members: 105,000
- Key people: Indra Deo Mishra, President Bishwanath Pyakurel, Chairman
- Website: www.nituf.org

The Nepal Inclusive Trade Union Federation (NITUF) is a national trade union centre in Nepal.

Organization leadership attended the three-day National Labour and Employment Conference 2069 BS in 2012 in Kathmandu.
