= Central National de Trabajadores de Panama =

- Central National de Trabajadores de Panama
- Headquarters: Panama City, Panama
- Location: Panama
- Affiliations: WFTU

The Central National de Trabajadores de Panama is a national trade union center in Panama. It is affiliated with the World Federation of Trade Unions.

== See also ==
- Confederation of Workers of the Republic of Panama
- General Confederation of Workers of Panama
