= Campaign for the Feminine Woman =

Anti-feminist organisation in the UK

The Campaign for the Feminine Woman (CFW) was an organisation in Edwardian England, opposing suffrage for women.

In November 1978, an organisation of the same name was re-established in the United Kingdom by David Stayt. In February 1985, it was renamed Concern for Family and Womanhood, but retained "Campaign for the Feminine Woman" as a subtitle. A Christian-based organisation, it campaigned for traditional gender differences and roles to be re-established, supported wives remaining at home to look after the household and the children and submitting to their husband as the head of the household, and opposed married women obtaining jobs (claiming these would be better given to unemployed men) or any women working in jobs such as the armed forces or frontline policing. It also considered it "fundamentally unnatural to put women over men" and therefore considered women should not be in managerial roles or positions of power in the country. It opposed feminism, abortion, promiscuity, and homosexuality, which it considered could be "cured".
