= Italian Confederation of Free Workers' Unions =

CISAL
- Italian Confederation of Free Workers' Unions
- Confederazione Italiana Sindacati Autonomi Lavoratori
- Founded: 1957
- Headquarters: Rome, Italy
- Location: Italy
- Members: 50 unions
- Key people: Francesco Cavallaro, general secretary
- Affiliations: CESI
- Website: www.cisal.org

The Italian Confederation of Free Workers' Unions (CISAL) is a national trade union center in Italy. It was formed in 1957 and is affiliated with the European Confederation of Independent Trade Unions.
