= Jordan Dental Association =

The Jordan Dental Association (Arabic: نقابة أطباء الأسنان) is an association of dentists that was founded in 1952.

== History ==
It was one of the first professional associations founded in Jordan. There were 20 dental doctors in it when it was founded, and their first head was Dr. Burhan Abd Alhadi, whose clinic was in Jerusalem.

== Legal Framework ==
The following laws regulate the operation of the JDA:

- The bylaws of the Jordan Dental Association were published in 1972.
- The system of licensing dentists was promulgated by Act No. 80 of the Public Health Act of 1971.
- The issuance of the Dentist Retirement System in 1976.
- The issuance of the health insurance and social security system for dentists in 1983.
- The issuance of a licensing system for dental clinics and centers in 2001.
- The issuance of the Law of the Jordan Medical Council for Medicine and Dentistry in 2002.
