= Central de Trabajadores de Costa Rica =

CTCR
- Central de Trabajadores de Costa Rica
- Headquarters: San José, Costa Rica
- Location: Costa Rica
- Affiliations: WFTU

The Central de Trabajadores de Costa Rica (CTCR) is a trade union centre in Costa Rica.

It is affiliated with the World Federation of Trade Unions.
