= Cape Verde Confederation of Free Trade Unions =

National trade union centre in Cape Verde

CCSL
- Confederação Cabo-Verdiana dos Sindicatos Livres
- Founded: November 1992
- Location: Cape Verde
- Members: 19,786
- Affiliations: ITUC

The Cape Verde Confederation of Free Trade Unions (Portuguese: Confederação Cabo-Verdiana dos Sindicatos Livres, CCSL) is a national trade union centre in Cape Verde.

In July 2017, CCSL and UNTC-CS (National Union of Workers of Cabo Verde) signed an agreement with the government to promote social peace and increase national minimum wage from EUR 108 to EUR 135 by 2020.
