= United General Workers Union =

Trade union in Belize

United General Workers Union is a central trade union organization in Belize.

The union was founded in 1979, through the merger of the Belize General Development Workers' Union and the Southern Christian Union. As of 1980, it claimed about 6,000 members. During the 1980s UGWU was seen as the most left-wing trade union organisation in the country.
