= Christian Trade Union Federation of Germany =

National trade union center in Germany

CGB
- Christian Trade Union Federation of Germany
- Christlicher Gewerkschaftsbund Deutschlands
- Founded: 1959
- Headquarters: Berlin, Germany
- Location: Germany
- Members: 280,000
- Key people: Matthäus Strebl, president
- Affiliations: CESI
- Website: www.cgb.info

The Christian Trade Union Federation of Germany (CGB) is a national trade union center in Germany. It has a membership of 280,000, and is affiliated with the European Confederation of Independent Trade Unions.

== Affiliates ==
Association of Catholic German Teachers (VkdL)
Association of Hotel, Restaurant and Cafe Employees (Ganymed)
Christian Metal Union (CGM)
Christian Union of Mining, Chemistry and Energy (CGBCE)
Christian Union of German Railway Workers (CGDE)
Christian Union of the Postal Service and Telecommunications (CGPT)
DHV
Employees' Association of Industry, Commerce and Services (BIGD)
Finance Administration Union (GdFin)
Motorists' Union (KFG)
Union of Public Services and Services (GÖD) in Munich
Union of the Plastics Industry and Wood Processing (GKH)
Workers' Association of German Milk Control and Animal Breeding Staff (ADM)

== Presidents ==
1959: Peter Gier
1964: Paul Seiler
1969: Franz Weigl
1973: Günter Volmer
1986: Martin Schetter
1990: Peter Konstroffer
2002: Wolfgang Jaeger
2004: Matthäus Strebl

== See also ==
- Christian Democratic Employees' Association
