= Union of Independent Trade Unions (Portugal) =

USI
- Union of Independent Trade Unions
- União dos Sindicatos Independentes
- Founded: November 2000
- Headquarters: Lisbon
- Location: Portugal
- Members: 15,000
- Key people: Paulo Gonçalves Marcos, president
- Affiliations: CESI
- Website: www.usi.pt

The Union of Independent Trade Unions (USI) is a national trade union center in Portugal founded on 18 November 2000. It is composed of 14 trade unions from the public services, banking, transport and energy sectors.
