= Jordanian teachers' syndicate =

Jordan Teachers' Syndicate
- نقابة المعلمين الأردنيين
- Founded: 2011
- Dissolved: July 2020
- Headquarters: Amman, Jordan
- Location: Jordan
- Members: 140,000
- Website: www.jts.org.jo

The Jordanian Teachers' Syndicate (JTS) is a professional union founded in 2011 representing teachers in Jordan, established by Law No. 14 of 2011, after a series of 70 labor protests staged during the Arab Spring. It represented around 140,000 teachers in Jordan, and most of the union's members were public school teachers.

The syndicate, or union, was considered the largest independent organisation in the country. In early September 2019, the union went on a month-long strike demanding higher pay and eventually reaching a deal with the government for a 35% to 50% rise in teachers' salaries.

On July 25, 2020, the Jordan Teachers Syndicate headquarters in Amman was raided by police, as were 11 other branches across the country. All 13 syndicate board members were arrested. Attorney General Hassan Abdallat issued the order to forcibly close the syndicate for a period of two years. Approximately 250 people were subsequently detained in a series of protests opposing the dissolution of the Jordan Teachers Syndicate, although the exact number of arrests has not been reported as the Jordanian government has imposed a gag order on Jordanian media outlets, banning all reporting on the story. In December 2020, five leaders of the syndicate were sentenced to a year in prison, which was later appealed and the defendants were bailed. The Amman Magistrate's Court ordered the organization's permanent dissolution.
