= Public Service Union of Belize =

The Public Service Union of Belize is a trade union representing public sector workers in Belize.

The union was founded in 1922 as a professional organisation, named the Civil Service Association. In the early 1960s, it renamed itself as the Public Officers Union, expanding its membership to include workers in state enterprises, and also workers in privatised industries. It transformed itself into a trade union, and campaigned against the orientation of the country towards Central America, rather than the Caribbean, or the possibility of it becoming a one-party state under the People's United Party.

In 1966, the union organised a sit-down strike against a customs union with Guatemala, which it viewed as a step towards the absorption of Belize by that country.

The union survived, and was later affiliated with the National Trade Union Congress of Belize.
