= General Federation of Trade Unions (Syria) =

Syrian national trade union center

GFTU
- General Federation of Trade Unions
- الاتحاد العام لنقابات العمال
- Founded: 1948
- Headquarters: Damascus, Syria
- Location: Syria
- Members: 300,000
- Key people: Fawaz al-Ahmad, President
- Affiliations: WFTU (Note: Suspsended from the WFTU on April 4, 2025.); ICATU; National Progressive Front (until 2025)
- Website: workers.org.sy

The General Federation of Trade Unions (GFTU; Arabic: الاتحاد العام لنقابات العمال) is a trade union federation that was formerly the sole national trade union center in Syria, it was founded in 1948. By a 1968 decree establishing a single-trade-union system, all trade unions in the country are required to be affiliated to the GFTU, and the GFTU had the power to dissolve the executive committee of any union.

The union was closely linked with the Syrian Regional Branch of the Arab Socialist Ba'ath Party. Former president of the GFTU, Shaaban Azzouz, is a member of the party. However, following the fall of the Assad regime and the dissolution of its ruling National Progressive Front, the GFTU remains active and is recognized by the Syrian transitional government.

The GFTU is affiliated with the International Confederation of Arab Trade Unions, and until 2025 was affiliated with the World Federation of Trade Unions.

== History ==
On 4 April 2025 the GFTU was suspended from the World Federation of Trade Unions, whose executive claimed the GFTU supports the "jihadist regime, which is the result of the interventions of the imperialist powers that want to seize the wealth of the region."

On 30 November the first general conference after the fall of the Assad regime began, with the slogan “A Legacy of Struggle… A Pledge of Giving”. The one day conference began with a history of the history of the GFTU with Fawaz al-Ahmad stating that the GFTU has started to, "revitalize union life, reactivate occupational health and safety programs, and strengthen the workers’ health system by linking routine examinations to workplace requirements."
