= Independent Democratic Confederation of Nepalese Trade Union =

Trade union federation in Nepal

INDECONT
- Independent Democratic Confederation of Nepalese Trade Union
- स्वतन्त्र प्रजातान्त्रिक ट्रेड युनियन महासंघ
- Founded: May 22, 2003
- Type: trade union
- Location: Nepal
- Members: 105,000
- Key people: Krishna Prasad Subedi, President
- Website: www.indecont.org.np

Independent Democratic Confederation of Nepalese Union (Nepali: स्वतन्त्र प्रजातान्त्रिक ट्रेड युनियन महासंघ, INDECONT) is a national trade union center in Nepal. INDECONT is affiliated with 13 unions. It is part of the Joint Trade Union Coordination Centre. It is affiliated with the Rastriya Prajatantra Party Nepal.
