= Egyptian Trade Union Federation =

ETUF
- Egyptian Trade Union Federation
- الاتحاد العام لنقابات عمال مصر
- Founded: 1957; 69 years ago
- Headquarters: Cairo, Egypt
- Members: about 6 million workers
- Key people: Gebaly Mohamed Gebaly, Chairman; Abdel Monem al-Gamal, Deputy Chairman
- Affiliations: ICATU, OATUU
- Website: www.etufegypt.com

The Egyptian Trade Union Federation (ETUF) is a trade union based in Cairo, Egypt.

== History and profile ==
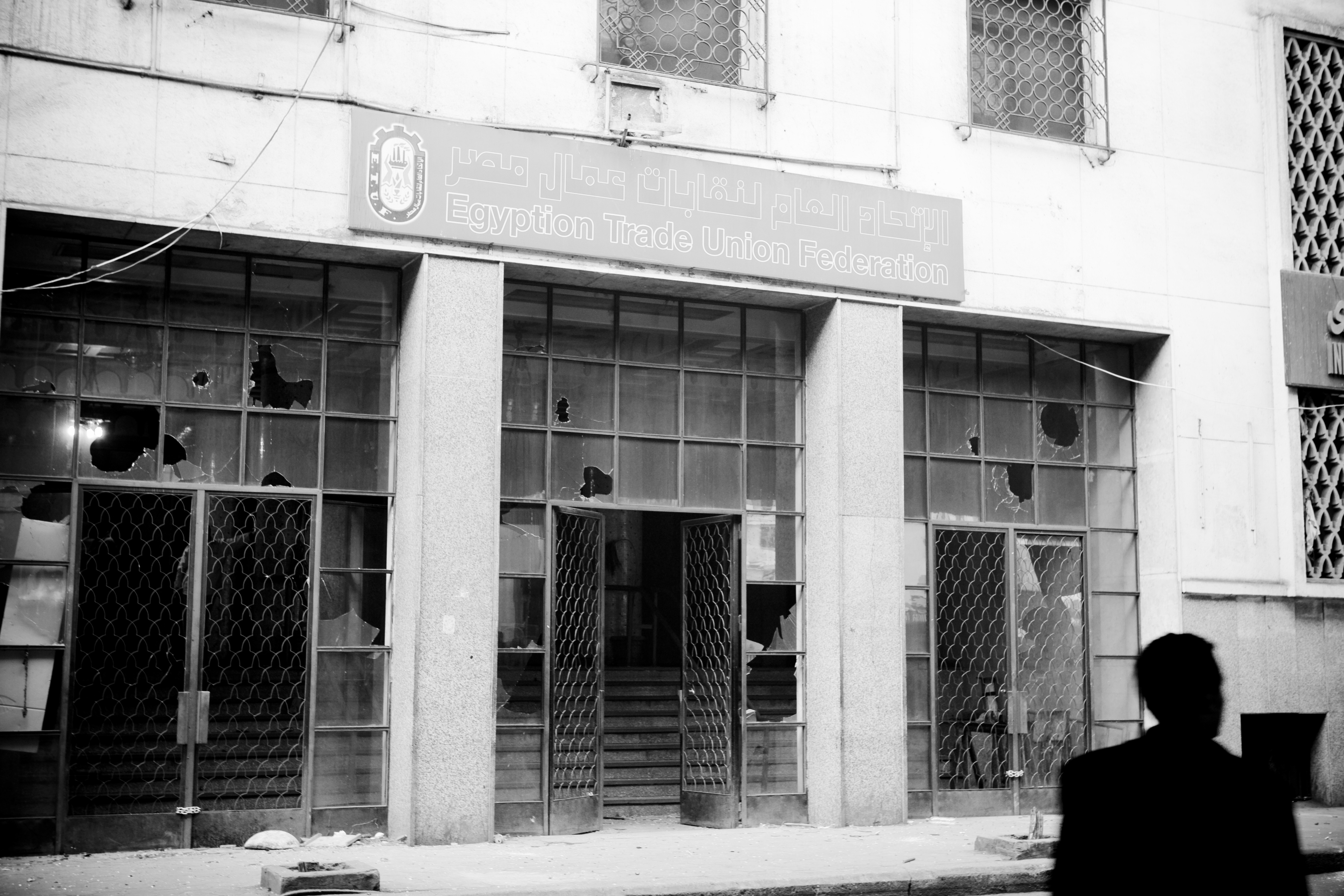
In February 2011, workers dissatisfied with the refusal of the leadership of the ETUF to support the Arab Spring protested outside the offices of the union.

The ETUF was founded in 1957 as a state-controlled union. Until 2011 all unions other than the ETUF were banned. During the Egyptian Revolution of 2011 ETUF leaders were active in defending the Mubarak regime, including participating in attacks on peaceful protestors.
