= German Civil Service Federation =

dbb
- German Civil Service Association
- DBB Beamtenbund und Tarifunion
- Founded: 1918
- Headquarters: Berlin, Germany
- Location: Germany
- Members: 1,250,000
- Key people: Ulrich Silberbach, president
- Affiliations: CESI
- Website: www.dbb.de

The German Civil Service Association (German: DBB Beamtenbund und Tarifunion) is a national trade union centre in Germany. It has a membership of 1,250,000 and is affiliated with the European Confederation of Independent Trade Unions.
