= European Confederation of Independent Trade Unions =

CESI
- European Confederation of Independent Trade Unions
- Confédération Européenne des Syndicats Indépendants
- Founded: 1990
- Headquarters: Brussels, Belgium
- Location: Europe
- Members: 5 million
- Key people: Romain Wolff - President, Klaus Heeger - Secretary General
- Affiliations: Independent
- Website: www.cesi.org

The European Confederation of Independent Trade Unions (CESI; French Confédération Européenne des Syndicats Indépendants, German Europäische Union der unabhängigen Gewerkschaften, Italian Confederazione Europea Sindacati Indipendenti) is a regional trade union federation representing around 5 million members of independent trade unions in Europe.

CESI represents free and independent trade unions from the private and public sectors that adhere to democratic principles and defend the respect of human rights.

== CESI ==
Founded in 1990, CESI advocates for improved employment conditions for workers in Europe and a strong social dimension in the EU. CESI represents workers from both the public and private sectors, with a particular strength in the public sector. Its affiliates are employed in various fields such as administration, security and justice, defense, and transport.

CESI defends trade union pluralism as a core component of freedom and democracy and adheres to ethical principles such as integrity, fairness and transparency. It promotes a European social model based on solidarity and subsidiarity and strives to maintain non-discrimination and gender equality. It works in line with the principles of the Charter of Fundamental Rights of the European Union and the Convention for the Protection of Human Rights and Fundamental Freedoms.

== Composition ==
=== Governance ===
The current President of CESI is Romain Wolff, of the Luxembourgish General Confederation of Civil Servants. Mr Wolff was elected in December 2012 and re-elected at the CESI congress in 2016. The current Secretary General of CESI is Klaus Heeger. Mr Heeger was elected in December 2012 and re-elected in the 2016 CESI Congress.

Congress takes place once every 4 years. During the CESI Congress, the Presidium and Board are elected. The Presidium and the Board govern CESI during its four-year period. The most recent Congress took place in Brussels in December 2016. Congress also gives member organisations the opportunity to put forward motions for CESI to act upon in its 4-year mandate.

CESI is involved in advocacy work as an interest group and in social dialogue as a recognised European social partner, since 2005. In 2013, the CESI Youth was created for CESI’s young affiliates.

CESI is also composed of a Europe Academy, which it is not only its training branch, but also a point of contact for information on certain elements of social dialogue at the EU level. The Board consists of a President, Vice Presidents and 3 ex-officio members (the President of CESI, the Secretary General and the Treasurer).

== Member organisations ==
The European Confederation of Independent Trade Unions consists of 38 national trade union organisations from 21 European countries and 4 European trade union organisations, with a total of more than 5 million individual members. 2 further trade union organisations enjoy observer status. The largest member organisations come from Germany, France, Spain and Italy.

Affiliate	Abbreviation	Country
Air Traffic Controllers European Unions Coordination	ATCEUC	International
Autonomous Train Drivers’ Unions of Europe	ALE	International
Christian Trade Union Federation of Germany	CGB	Germany
Connectief	Connectief	Netherlands
Customs Officials Association	TVML	Finland
Dutch Categorial Financial Union	NCF	Netherlands
European Federation of Public Services Employees	EUROFEDOP	International
French Autonomous Public Service Federation	FA-FP	France
French Confederation of Management – General Confederation of Executives	FP CFE-CGC	France
French Free Catholic Education Professional Trade Union Federation	SPELC	France
French Trade Union Confederation of National Education	CSEN	France
General Confederation of Civil Services	CGFP	Luxembourg
General Federation of Local Administration	FGFC	Luxembourg
General Trade Union of the Republic of Lithuania	RJPS	Lithuania
German Armed Forces Association	DBWV	Germany
German Civil Service Federation	DBB	Germany
German Federation of Food Chemists in Public Service	BLC	Germany
Hungarian Civil Servants and Public Employees Trade Union	MKKSz	Hungary
Italian Association of Health and Safety Instructors	ANFOS	Italy
Italian Confederation of Free Workers' Unions	CISAL	Italy
Italian Independent Confederation of Executives, Supervisors and Managers in Public Administrations	CONFEDIR	Italy
Italian Workers' Autonomous Trade Unions Confederation	CONFSAL	Italy
Independent General Federation of Civil Servants	FGAF	France
Latvian Medical and Nursing Staff Workers' Union	LAADA	Latvia
Latvian State Agencies, Municipalities, Businesses and Financial Officers Union	LVIPUFDA	Latvia
Montenegrin Trade Union of Physicians	SDMCG	Montenegro
National Association of Teachers in Spain	ANPE	Spain
National Teachers Association	ANP	Portugal
National Trade Union Confederation – Meridian	CSN Meridian	Romania
National Union of Public Services	UNSP-NUOD	Belgium
Polish Free Trade Union “Forum – Education”	WZZ F-O	Poland
Romanian Free Trade Union in Pre-University Education Iaşi	USLIP Iaşi	Romania
Serbian Trade Union of Doctors and Pharmacists	SLFS	Serbia
Spanish Central Independent and Public Employees’ Trade Union	CSIF	Spain
Spanish Federation of Trade Union Associations	FASGA	Spain
Spanish Nursing Technicians Trade Union	SAE	Spain
Spanish Trade Union of Nursing Professionals	SATSE	Spain
Swiss Central Association of Public Personnel	ZV	Switzerland
Swiss Union of Federal Executives	VKB	Switzerland
Trade Union of Physicians in Srpska in Bosnia and Herzegovina	SSDMRS	Bosnia and Herzegovina
Union for Unity	U4U	International
