= Railway Workers' Union (Pakistan) =

RWU (OL), RWU (W)
- Railway Workers' Union (Open Line), Railway Workers' Union (Workshops)
- ریلوے ورکرز یونین
- Founded: 1948
- Headquarters: Karachi, Pakistan
- Location: Pakistan
- Key people: Manzoor Ahmed Razi, Chairman; Ashiq Hussain Chaudhary, President; Muhammad Naseem Rao, General Secretary
- Affiliations: APTUF, ITF
- Website: www.facebook.com/rwu.pakistan/ twitter.com/RWUPakistan

The Railway Workers' Union (RWU, Urdu: ریلوے ورکرز یونین) is a trade union of railway workers in Pakistan. It is among the oldest and largest trade unions in the country. It is affiliated with the All Pakistan Trade Union Federation and International Transport Workers' Federation.

== Organisation ==
The trade union is composed of Railway Workers' Union (Open Lines) (Urdu: ریلوے ورکرز یونین اوپن لائن کی) and Railway Workers' Union (Workshops). Current office bearers in the trade union are:

- Manzoor Ahmed Razi, Chairman
- Ashiq Hussain Chaudhary, President
- Muhammad Naseem Rao, General Secretary

== History ==
The Railway Workers' Union was founded in 1948 by Pakistani trade union leader Mirza Mohammad Ibrahim. The poet Faiz Ahmed Faiz was elected as first Office Secretary.

In 1960, RWU had 93,841 members in Pakistan.

In October 1967, RWU went on strike in Lahore against price hikes and the unavailability of wheat. Together with a student movement, the union also protested against the dictatorship of Ayub Khan. RWU shut down rail service completely for 13 days. Hundreds of its workers and leaders were arrested in response. In the 1970s, Zulfikar Ali Bhutto introduced the separation of railway unions into open line and workshop sections. According to RWU's general secretary Muhammad Naseem Rao, this broke the unity of the workers. Mohammed Yousaf Baloch joined RWU in this period. In 1993, Moeen Qureshi declared the open line section of the railway an essential service, prohibiting its workers from striking. Under Pervez Musharraf, labour activity in the railway sector was again completely banned.

In March 2010, RWU protested in Rawalpindi against the proposed privatisation of Pakistan Railways (PR). The Workers' Party Pakistan and the National Students Federation also joined the protest. In January 2011, RWU and the Pakistan Railway Employees Union (PREM) rejected a plan to lay off 20,000 PR employees. In February 2012, RWU again protested against planned PR privatisation. In the same month, RWU protested against privatisation again together with the Railway Mehnetkash Union, the Railway Mazdoor Union and PREM. The unions also demanded that retired workers should be paid their due wages. RWU again protested against privatisation of PR together with the All Pakistan Trade Union Federation in 2014.

In 2017, six RWU members were arrested for conducting a strike in Rawalpindi.
