= Namibia National Labour Organisation =

Trade union centre in Namibia

NANLO
- Namibia National Labour Organisation
- Founded: 2014
- Location: Namibia
- Members: 21,000 (estimated)
- Key people: Evilastus Kaaronda, president

The Namibia National Labour Organisation (NANLO) is one of three national trade union centres in Namibia. NANLO was established in 2014 by Evilastus Kaaronda. After campaigning against government corruption, Kaaronda in 2012 was dismissed as general secretary of the National Union of Namibian Workers (NUNW), the national centre aligned to SWAPO, the country's ruling party.

== Affiliates ==
NANLO has three affiliated unions:

- The Metal, Mining, Maritime and Construction Union (MMMC)
- The Namibia Parastatals and Civil Service Workers Union (NPCWU)
- Solidarity Union (SU) - organises commercial, retail, tourism sectors.

== See also ==
- National Union of Namibian Workers (NUNW)
- Trade Union Congress of Namibia (TUCNA)
