= General Confederation of Labour of the Congo =

Trade union in the Democratic Republic of the Congo

- General Confederation of Labour of the Congo
- Confédération Générale du Travail du Congo
- Headquarters: Kinshasa, DRC
- Location: Democratic Republic of the Congo
- Affiliations: WFTU

The General Confederation of Labour of the Congo (Confédération Générale du Travail du Congo or CGTC) is a national trade union centre in the Democratic Republic of the Congo. It is affiliated with the World Federation of Trade Unions.
