= Workers' Trade Union Association of Croatia =

- Udruga radničkih sindikata Hrvatske
- Abbreviation: URSH/WTUAC
- Founded: June 9, 1994; 32 years ago
- Headquarters: Zagreb, Croatia
- Location: Croatia
- Members: 23,739 (42 unions)
- Key people: Damir Jakuš (President)
- Affiliations: EUROFEDOP
- Website: www.ursh.hr
- Formerly called: Trade Union Association of Public Sector Employees

The Workers' Trade Union Association of Croatia (Croatian: Udruga radničkih sindikata Hrvatske) is a trade union centre in Croatia. It was founded in 1994 under the name Trade Union Association of Public Sector Employees (Croatian: Udruga radničkih sindikata javnih poduzeća Hrvatske).

It is affiliated with the European Federation of Public Service Employees.
