= Trade Union Congress of Namibia =

Trade union center of Namibia

TUCNA
- Trade Union Congress of Namibia
- Founded: 2002
- Headquarters: Windhoek, Namibia
- Location: Namibia
- Members: 61,900 (estimated)
- Key people: Paulus Hango, president Kavihuha Mahongora, secretary general
- Website: tucna.org.na

The Trade Union Congress of Namibia (TUCNA) is one of three national trade union centres in Namibia. TUCNA was formed as a merger between the Namibia Federation of Trade Unions (NAFTU) and the Namibia People’s Social Movement (NPSM) in May 2002. The TUCNA was created by unions which rejected linkages with Namibia's ruling party, the South West Africa People's Organization (SWAPO).

== Affiliates ==
The TUCNA has 13 affiliated member unions with the following estimated membership in 2017:

Union	Established	Membership
Namibia Wholesale and Retail Workers Union (NWRWU)		15,000
Public Service Union of Namibia (PSUN)	1981	23,000
Namibia Building Workers Union (NABWU)		4,000
Namibia Bank Workers Union (NBWU)		500
Bank Workers Union of Namibia (BAWON)		500
Teachers Union of Namibia (TUN)		7,000
Namibia Retail and Allied Workers Union (NRAWU)		not known
Namibia Seaman and Allied Workers Union (NASAWU)		7,500
Namibia Security Guard and Watchmen Union (NASGAWU)		400
Namibia Nurses Union (NANU)		3,500
Namibia Fuel and Allied Workers Union (NAFAWU)		not known
Namibia Football Players Union (NFPU)		not known
Namibia Fishing Industries and Fishermen Workers Union		500
Total		61,900

== See also ==
- Namibia National Labour Organisation (NANLO)
- National Union of Namibian Workers (NUNW)
