= British Shipping (Assistance) Act 1935 =

Act of the Parliament of the United Kingdom

British Shipping (Assistance) Act 1935 (Note: Section 8.)
- Act of Parliament
- Parliament of the United Kingdom
- Long title: An Act to make provision for the granting of financial assistance to the owners of ships registered in the United Kingdom in respect of tramp voyages carried out during the year nineteen hundred and thirty-five, and to persons qualified to be owners of British ships in respect of proposals for the improvement of merchant shipping fleets; to provide for the repeal of section eighteen of the Economy (Miscellaneous Provisions) Act, 1926; and for purposes connected with the matters aforesaid.
- Citation: 25 & 26 Geo. 5. c. 7
- Territorial extent: United Kingdom

Dates
- Royal assent: 26 February 1935
- Commencement: 26 February 1935 (Note: The Acts of Parliament (Commencement) Act 1793.)
- Repealed: 23 May 1950
Other legislation
Amends	Economy (Miscellaneous Provisions) Act 1926
Repealed by	Statute Law Revision Act 1950

Status: Repealed

Text of statute as originally enacted

The British Shipping (Assistance) Act 1935 (25 & 26 Geo. 5. c. 7) was an act of the Parliament of the United Kingdom which subsidised the British shipping industry during the Great Depression. £10,000,000 was given to allow the building or modernisation of tramp markets.

== Subsequent developments ==
The whole act was repealed by section 1(1) of, and the first schedule to, the Statute Law Revision Act 1950 (14 Geo. 6. c. 6), which came into force on 23 May 1950.
