= General Confederation of Workers of Panama =

CGTP
- General Confederation of Workers of Panama
- Confederación General de Trabajadores de Panamá
- Headquarters: Panama City, Panama
- Location: Panama
- Key people: Mariano Mena, secretary general
- Affiliations: ITUC

The General Confederation of Workers of Panama (CGTP) is a national trade union center in Panama. It is affiliated with the International Trade Union Confederation.

== See also ==
- Confederation of Workers of the Republic of Panama
- Central National de Trabajadores de Panama
