= Confederation of Filipino Workers =

National trade union federation in the Philippines

CFW
- Confederation of Filipino Workers
- Founded: 15 April 1986
- Headquarters: Suite 203, LBB I Bldg., 820 Remedios cor Taft Avenue Manila, Philippines
- Location: Philippines
- Members: 50,000
- Key people: Efren P. Aranzamendez, National President
- Affiliations: International Textile, Garment and Leather Workers' Federation
- Website: www.facebook.com/CFWLABORCENTER/

The Confederation of Filipino Workers (CFW) is a national trade union federation in the Philippines. It was founded 15 April 1986, and has a dues-paying membership of around 50,000. It is the only federation with the most number of unions in the export processing zones, especially in Mariveles, Bataan. The current president is an executive member of the ITGLWF and is the concurrent president of the Philippine Council of the ITGLWF in the Philippines, composed of ten federations until 2010.

The CFW is affiliated with the International Textile & Garment and Leather Workers Federation based in Brussels, Belgium which is a member of the International Trade Union Confederation
