= All Pakistan Trade Union Federation =

National trade union center in Pakistan

APTUF
- All Pakistan Trade Union Federation
- Founded: 1988
- Headquarters: Lahore, Pakistan
- Location: Pakistan
- Members: 240 unions
- Key people: Aima Mahmood chairperson Gulzar Ahmed Chaudhry, general secretary
- Affiliations: Pakistan Workers Confederation
- Website: www.labourunity.org

The All Pakistan Trade Union Federation (Urdu: آل پاکستان ٹريڈ يونين فيڈريشن, APTUF) is a national trade union center in Pakistan.

It was formed in 1988 and has 240 affiliated unions, including workers in unorganized sectors such as brick kilns, oil tankers, and the carpet industry. It is the second largest trade union federation in Pakistan. the APTUF is an independent and democratic national trade union federation which organizes workers throughout Balochistan, Punjab, Sindh, and Khyber Pakhtunkhwa provinces.

== Areas of Organization ==
The APTUF maintains affiliated unions in a variety of industries in both the public and private sector, including:

- Agriculture
- Chemical
- Commercial
- Paper & board
- Pharmaceuticals
- Printing
- Railway Workers' Union
- Rubber
- Shoes
- Steel

== Women's wing ==
The APTUF is unique in Pakistan because of the strength of its women's wing. The Women's Wing of the APTUF works to mobilize women workers on trade union platforms. The women leaders in the APTUF have faced many threats from both religious extremists and the government. Although Pakistan does not permit women to participate directly in trade union activities, the Women's Wing uses the strategy of involving family members in the unions to serve as spokespeople for the women. The Pakistani Working Women Organization (WWO) is an independent organization that collaborates with and supports the APTUF.

== Work with other unions and international links ==
The APTUF is a member of the Pakistan Workers Confederation and works closely with the International Liaison Committee for a Workers' International based in Paris, France. For example, after the massive earthquake on 9 October 2005 in Pakistan, APTUF asked International Liaison Committee for a Workers' International for help to contribute medicines, tents, blankets, food, drinking water and clothes.

The APTUF has established close cooperation with other independent pro-workers trade union federations, both in Asia and across the world. These ties serve to promote friendship and the exchange of information, as well as voice solidarity towards other struggles in the labor movement.
