= Confederation of Workers of the Republic of Panama =

National trade union center in Panama

CTRP
- Confederation of Workers of the Republic of Panama
- Confederación de Trabajadores de la República de Panamá
- Founded: 1956
- Headquarters: Panama City, Panama
- Location: Panama
- Members: 35,000
- Key people: Guillermo Puga, secretary general
- Affiliations: ITUC
- Website: ctrpanama.org

The Confederation of Workers of the Republic of Panama (Spanish: Confederación de Trabajadores de la República de Panamá, CTRP) is a national trade union center located in Panama. It has a claimed membership of 35,000 and is affiliated with the International Trade Union Confederation.

== See also ==
- Central National de Trabajadores de Panama
- General Confederation of Workers of Panama
