= National Trade Union Confederation (Cambodia) =

Trade union federation in Cambodia

NTUC
- Founded: 2012
- Location: Cambodia
- Members: 10,000 (claimed)
- Key people: Far Saly, President

The National Trade Union Confederation (NTUC) is a trade union federation in Cambodia. The union is politically independent and not tied to government or opposition parties.

== History ==
Far Saly formed NTUC in 2012.

In 2015, NTUC protested at Siko Phnom Penh garment factory in Cambodia's capital against the dismissal of a warehouse chief for founding an NTUC branch in the factory. In 2016, NTUC condemned a proposal by Sam Rainsy to the European Parliament to decrease garment imports from Cambodia in order to increase political pressure on the regime of Hun Sen. In that year, the union also stated its discontent with the way the Ministry of Labour had pushed through a new union law. NTUC claims to have had between 20,000 and 30,000 members around 2016, but that more repressive government attitudes towards trade unions shrank the number to 10,000 by 2018.

In the early phase of the COVID-19 pandemic, NTUC appealed to the government to temporarily close down factories to stop the spread of the pandemic. In 2021, the union called on the government to cancel that year's Cambodian New Year. In January of that year, NTUC president Far Saly was summoned for questioning by a court over allegations of defaming a Chinese factory owner's reputation.
