= Workers Union of the Comoros =

- Union des Travailleurs des Comores
- Abbreviation: UTC
- Headquarters: Moroni
- Location: Comoros
- Affiliations: OATUU

The Workers Union of the Comoros (French: Union des Travailleurs des Comores, UTC) is a national trade union center in the Comoros.
