= National Union of Namibian Workers =

Trade union center of Namibia

NUNW
- National Union of Namibian Workers
- Founded: April 24, 1971
- Headquarters: Windhoek, Namibia
- Location: Namibia
- Members: 84,900 (estimated)
- Key people: Risto Kapenda, president
- Affiliations: ITUC, OATUU
- Website: www.nunw.org.na

The National Union of Namibian Workers (NUNW) is one of three national trade union centers in Namibia. It was established in 1970 and is affiliated with SWAPO, Namibia's ruling political party.

== History ==
The NUNW was originally established as a general workers union in April 1970 through a resolution of the 1969/70 South West Africa People's Organisation (SWAPO) party congress in Tanzania. From that time, NUNW became the trade union wing of SWAPO.

In 1978, the NUNW affiliated to the World Federation of Trade Unions (WTFU). The headquarters in exile of the NUNW were set up in Luanda, Angola in 1979. From 1986, various industrial unions were established inside Namibia under the umbrella of the NUNW and in 1989, a consolidation congress took place that merged the exiled and internal wings of the NUNW into a unified federation. The NUNW was thus, as a trade union center, formally established in 1989. In 1991, the NUNW had seven affiliated unions with a total membership of over 60,000.

In October 2009 the NUNW affiliated to the International Trade Union Confederation (ITUC), thus effectively withdrawing from the WFTU. In January 2014, NUNW affirmed its allegiance to SWAPO, citing both a shared experience during colonialism and SWAPO's political positions.

== Affiliates ==
The NUNW has nine affiliated member unions with the following estimated membership in 2017.

Union	Membership	Established
Metal and Allied Namibia Workers Union (MANWU)	8,000	1987
Mineworkers Union of Namibia (MUN)	8,000	1986
Namibia Financial Institutions Union (NAFINU)	4,500	
Namibia Food and Allied Workers Union (NAFAU)	12,000	1986
Namibia National Teachers Union (NANTU)	16,000	1989
Namibia Public Workers Union (NAPWU)	25,000	1987
Namibia Transport and Allied Workers Union (NATAU)	4,000	1988
Namibia Music Industry Union (NAMIU)	400	
Namibia Farm Workers Union (NAFWU)	7,000	
Total	84,900	

== Notable members ==
- Tjekero Tweya, MP, NUNW president 1991–1993
- Bernhardt Esau, Secretary General of NUNW in 1991
- Evilastus Kaaronda, former General Secretary
- Hafeni Ludwigh Ndemula
- Pohamba Shifeta
- Ismael Kasuto, president from 1 May 2015
- Risto Kapenda, current president

== See also ==
- Namibia National Labour Organisation (NANLO)
- Trade Union Congress of Namibia (TUCNA)
