= Mirza Ibrahim =

Pakistani politician

Babaye Mehnat Kashan Mirza Ibrahim
- مرزا ابراہیم

Personal details
- Born: Mirza Mohammad Ibrahim; 1905 Kala Gujran, Punjab, British India
- Died: August 11, 1999 (aged 93–94) Lahore, Punjab, Pakistan
- Party: NAP(B)
- Other political affiliations: NAP (1957–1967); CPP (1947–1954); CPI (pre-1947)
- Occupation: railway worker

Mirza Mohammad Ibrahim (1905-11 August 1999) was a Pakistani leftist politician, trade union leader, poet, and writer. He was one of the important labor leaders based in the railway workshops of Mughalpura, Lahore.

== Biography ==
Mirza Ibrahim was born in 1905 in the village of Kala Gujran in Punjab Province, British India. In 1921, during his adolescence, Ibrahim was imprisoned for participating in the Khilafat Movement. Three years later, he moved to Rawalpindi and worked as a brick laborer, garden gardener, and railway worker. After relocating to Lahore in 1930, he became involved in the trade union movement, joined the Communist Party of India, and was elected president of the Railway Federation. He was a member of the All-India Trade Union Congress. In addition, he established the Railway Workers’ Union. During the Pakistan Movement, he maintained good relations with its leader Muhammad Ali Jinnah. He was among the important labor leaders based in the railway workshops of Mughalpura, Lahore. After the independence of Pakistan in 1947, he launched movements with railway workers for wage increases, which led to his arrest by the government of Pakistan. Subsequently, along with other workers, he formed the Pakistan Trade Union Federation and was elected as its founding president. In the 1951 Punjab Provincial Assembly election, he contested from the Lahore railway constituency, though he lost to the candidate of the Pakistan Muslim League due to the opposition's electoral malpractice. Later, he was imprisoned in connection with the Rawalpindi conspiracy. After the Pakistan Trade Union Federation and the Communist Party of Pakistan was banned in 1954, he joined the National Awami Party. In the 1970 Punjab Provincial Assembly election, he participated but was defeated. In 1994, under his leadership, nine trade union organizations came together to form the Pakistan Trade Union Confederation. He died on 11 August 1999.

== Legacy ==
In 2017, festivals were organized in the railway headquarters of Pakistan to commemorate him.
