= All Pakistan Federation of United Trade Unions =

APFUTU
- All Pakistan Federation of United Trade Unions
- Founded: 1992
- Headquarters: Imtiaz Labour Hall, Faizabad, Gujrat
- Location: Pakistan
- Members: 11,98419
- Key people: Mr.Zia Syed (Secretary General), Ms.Samina Irfan (President)
- Affiliations: 153 Unions
- Website: http://www.labourunity.org/ http://www.apfutu.org

The All Pakistan Federation of United Trade Unions (APFUTU) is a national trade union centre in Pakistan. It was formed in 1992 and was registered by the National Industrial Relations Commission. The APFUTU has a membership of 11,98419. The APFUTU-based industrial city of Gujrat (Punjab).

== Main affiliated trade unions ==
- Pak Employees Union, Municipal and Wood Working
- Punjab Local Transport Union
- Labour Union TMAs, Pak Employees Union
- TMA, Gujrat
- Pakistan Brick Kiln Labour Union
- Punjab Federation of Brick Kiln Labour Unions
- Punjab Federation of Agricultural Workshops
- DESCON Engineering Labour Union
- Pakistan Power Looms Employees Union
- Pakistan Civil Transport Workers Union
- Cab Federation of Transport Punjab
- Pakistan State Life Insurance Staff Union
- Anwar Industries Workers Union
- Amin Coal Mines Workers Union
- Jamhoori Workers Union
- WASA
- FDA, Fasilabad Workers & Staff Trade Union
- Crescent Sugar Mills Employees Union
- Agricultural Eng. Housing & Physical Planning National Employees Union
- State Life Insurance Staff Union
- Descon Engineering Mazdoor Union
- Dharki
- ICI Employees Union (CBA) Karachi
- Pak Employees Union Wood Working Center
- Labour & Staff Union (CBA) Shahtaj Sugar Mills Hussnain Textile Mills Workers Union
- Labour Union Zahid Garments Industry
- Pak Labour Union, Azhar Garments
- Pak Employees Union, Fazal Textile Mills
- Teachers and Education Association
- Union of Journalists, Pakistan
- Cultural Workers Union
- Sports Workers Forum
