= Pakistan Workers' Federation =

PWF
- Pakistan Workers' Federation (PWF)
- PWF
- Merged into: 2005
- Founded: 2005
- Headquarters: PWF Head Office, G-7/2, Islamabad
- Location: Pakistan
- Members: 210,280
- Key people: Asad Mehmood, General Secretary; Mr. Shaukat Ali Anjum, President; Ch. Abdul Rehman Aasi, Chairman; Patron In Chief Ch. Muhammad Yaseen
- Affiliations: ITUC
- Website: PWF Website

The Pakistan Workers' Federation (PWF) is a national trade union centre in Pakistan. It is the largest labour organisation in the country and its affiliated unions are among the oldest. The centre itself was created in 2005 through a merger of three former national centres. It is independent and non-political. Internationally, it is affiliated with ITUC.

== Organisation & affiliates ==
Trade unions affiliated with PWF include:

- Pakistan National Federation of Trade Unions (PNFTU)
- All Pakistan Federation of Labour (APFOL)
- All Pakistan Federation of Trade Unions (APFTU)

== History ==
All Pakistan Federation of Trade Unions (APFTU), All Pakistan Federation of Labour (APFOL) and Pakistan National Federation of Trade Unions (PNFTU) held an assembly in Abbottabad, where they announced their intention to merge within ten years. The merger did take place within that time and the founding convention of PWF took place in Islamabad on September 7, 2005.[1] All three merging unions remained affiliated individually with the ITUC.

== Attention ==
I would like to bring to your attention that the latest approval of the change in office bearers of the Pakistan Workers Federation (PWF) was confirmed by the National Industrial Relations Commission (NIRC) on 5th April 2023. In this decision, Ch. Muhammad Yaseen, along with other office bearers, was duly elected. However, some individuals are fraudulently using the name of PWF, which is not only a violation of Pakistan's legal system but also amounts to contempt of court. For any queries or clarifications, you may directly contact the National Industrial Relations Commission (NIRC). https://www.brecorder.com/news/40239785

ITUC put out a call for the restoration of a democratic system in Pakistan in 2007 along with the Pakistan Workers Federation. In 2011, thousands of workers protested against price hikes in Islamabad.

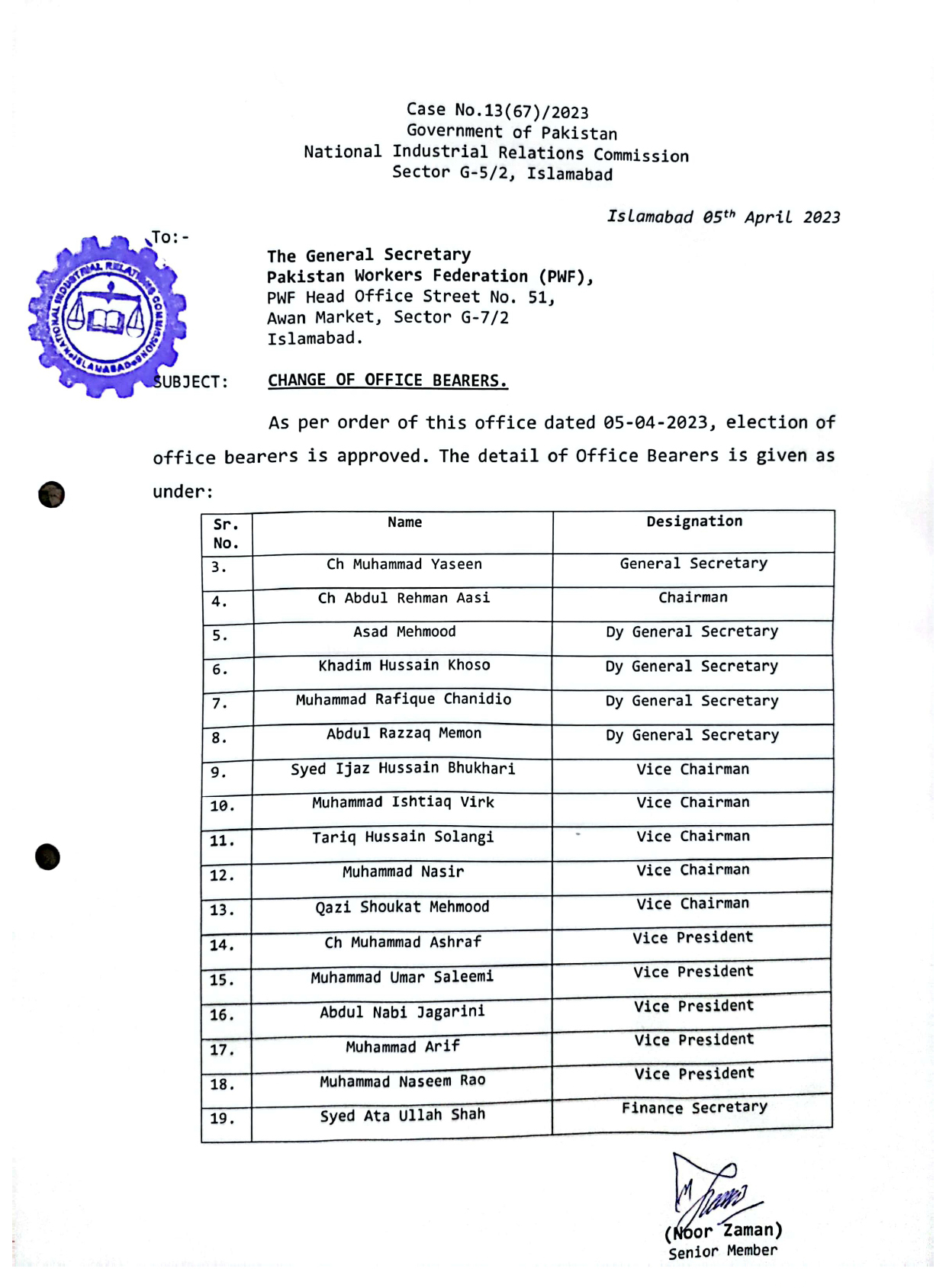
