= National Trade Union Confederation – Meridian =

CNS Meridian
- National Trade Union Confederation - Meridian
- Confederatia Nationala Sindicala "Meridian"
- Location: Romania
- Members: 170,000
- Key people: Ion Albu, general secretary

The National Trade Union Confederation – Meridian is the smallest national trade union center in Romania.
