= All Pakistan Trade Union Congress =

Pakistani trade union federation

APTUC
- All Pakistan Trade Union Congress
- Headquarters: Islamabad, Pakistan
- Location: Pakistan
- Key people: Karamat Hussain, Secretary General; Karamat Hussain, Secretary General
- Affiliations: International Trade Union Confederation (ITUC); Islamabad, Pakistan

The All Pakistan Trade Union Congress (APTUC) is a national trade union center in Pakistan. It is affiliated with the International Trade Union Confederation (ITUC) based in Islamabad, Pakistan .

In 2024, The New Secretary General of All Pakistan Trade Union Congress (APTUC) Is Karamat Hussain.

In 2011, All Pakistan Trade Union Congress had approximately 150,000 members nationwide. This organization's Secretary General, Shouket Ali was trying to rally the whole nation back then for relief work after the 2010 Pakistan floods. This would also mean getting the displaced flood victims and workers back to work.

In 2004, organized labour held a press conference in Karachi, Pakistan to demand the repeal of an anti-labor government ordinance called Industrial Relations Ordinance 2002.
