= International Confederation of Arab Trade Unions =

International trade union federation

Coordinates: 33°31′7.4″N 36°18′42.28″E

ICATU
- International Confederation of Arab Trade Unions
- Founded: 1956
- Headquarters: Damascus, Syria
- Location: International
- Key people: Jamal Al Qadiri, general secretary

The International Confederation of Arab Trade Unions (ICATU; ar:"الاتحاد الدولي لنقابات العمال العربي") is the international representation of trade unions in a number of Arab nations.

Founded in 1956, the ICATU was originally located in Egypt, but was moved to Syria in 1978 to protest Anwar Sadat's visit to Israel.

Affiliate trade unions include the following:

- General Federation of Trade Unions (Syria)
- General Federation of Oman Workers
- General Federation of Workers Trade Unions in Bahrain
- General Federation of Iraqi Trade Unions
- General Federation of Jordanian Trade Unions
- Palestinian General Federation of Trade Unions
- Democratic Workers' Union of Egypt
- Tunisian General Labour Union
- General and Autonomous Confederation Workers in Algeria (CGATA)
- Moroccan Federation of Labour
- The Democratic Confederation of Labour (CDT)
- General Federation of Women in Morocco
- Union of Mauritanian Workers
- Free Confederacy of Mauritania's Workers
- Yemeni Confederation of Labor Unions
