= All Pakistan Federation of Labour =

APFOL
- All Pakistan Federation of Labour
- Founded: 1951
- Headquarters: Lahore, Pakistan
- Location: Pakistan
- Key people: Saad Muhammad, Deputy General Secretary
- Affiliations: International Trade Union Confederation

The All Pakistan Federation of Labour (APFOL) is a national trade union centre in Pakistan. It was founded in 1951 by Rahmatullah Chaudhary.

In 2004, APFOL officeholders and other labour leaders demanded the repeal of an anti-labour law, called the Industrial Relations Ordinance (IRO)-2002, from the Pakistani government.

The APFOL merged into the Pakistan Workers' Federation in 2005 which, in turn, is affiliated with the International Trade Union Confederation based in Brussels, Belgium.
