= UNTC-CS =

- União Nacional dos Trabalhadores de Cabo Verde – Central Sindical
- Founded: 1978
- Headquarters: Praia, Cape Verde
- Location: Cape Verde
- Members: 35,000
- Key people: Joaquina Almeida, General Secretary
- Affiliations: ITUC, CSPLP
- Website: untc-cs.cv

The UNTC-CS (Portuguese: União Nacional dos Trabalhadores de Cabo Verde – Central Sindical, 'National Union of Workers of Cape Verde - Central Union') is a national trade union centre in Cape Verde with 21 affiliated unions.
