= Pakistan National Federation of Trade Unions =

Pakistani workers organization

PNFTU
- Pakistan National Federation of Trade Unions
- Headquarters: Karachi, Pakistan
- Location: Pakistan
- Key people: Mohammad Sharif, president Saleem Raza, general secretary
- Affiliations: ITUC

The Pakistan National Federation of Trade Unions (PNFTU) is a national trade union center in Pakistan. It is a member of the Pakistan Workers' Federation and is affiliated with the International Trade Union Confederation.
