= All Pakistan Federation of Trade Unions =

Pakistani workers' organization

APFTU
- All Pakistan Federation of Trade Unions
- Founded: 1947
- Headquarters: Lahore, Pakistan
- Location: Pakistan
- Members: 602,000
- Key people: Khurshid Ahmed, general secretary
- Affiliations: ITUC

The All Pakistan Federation of Trade Unions (APFTU) is a national trade union center in Pakistan. It was founded in 1947 and has a membership of 602,000.

The APFTU is affiliated with the International Trade Union Confederation.
