= Adnan Oktar bibliography =

Following is a list of books allegedly written by Turkish cult leader Adnan Oktar (born February 2, 1956), also known by the pen name Harun Yahya. Oktar and his cult are advocates of Islamic creationism.

== Credited works ==
- A Weapon of Satan: Romanticism
- A National Strategy for Turkey
- A String of Miracles
- Allah's Artistry in Colour
- Articles 1-2-3
- Behind the Scenes of Terrorism
- Communism in Ambush
- Consciousness in the Cell
- Confessions of Evolutionists
- Darwin's Antagonism Against the Turks
- Deep Thinking
- Eternity Has Already Begun
- Evolutionary Falsehoods
- Knowing the Truth
- Glory is Everywhere
- Israel's Kurdish Card
- Judaism and Freemasonry
- Miracles of the Qur'an
- Never Plead Ignorance
- Perished Nations
- Precise Answers to Evolutionists
- Truths 1-2
- The Atlas of Creation (Global Publishing, October 2006)
- The Disasters Darwinism Brought to Humanity
- The Evolution Deceit
- The Western World Turns to God
- The New Masonic Order
- The Prophet Moses
- The Prophet Joseph
- The Golden Age
- The 'Secret Hand' in Bosnia
- The Truth of the Life of This World
- The Religion of Darwinism
- The Bloody Ideology of Darwinism: Fascism
- The Dark Magic of Darwinism
- The Qur'an Leads the Way to Science
- The Real Origin of Life
- The Creation of the Universe
- The Design in Nature
- The End of Darwinism
- The Green Miracle: Photosynthesis
- The Holocaust Lie (Soykırım Yalanı) (1995)
- The Secrets of DNA
- The Miracle in the Atom
- The Miracle in the Cell
- The Miracle of the Immune System
- The Miracle in the Eye
- The Miracle of Creation in Plants
- The Miracle in the Spider
- The Miracle in the Ant
- The Miracle in the Gnat
- The Miracle in the Honeybee
- The Miracle of the Seed
- The Miracle of the Termite
- The Miracle of Hormone
- The Miracle of the Human Being
- The Miracle of Man's Creation
- The Miracle of Protein
- The Winter of Islam and Its Expected Spring
- Timelessness and the Reality of Fate
- Self-Sacrifice and Intelligent Behaviour Models in Animals
- Solution: The Morals of the Qur'an
- Freemasonry and Capitalism
- Satan’s Religion: Freemasonry
- Jehovah’s Sons and the Freemasons

== Children's books ==
- Children Darwin Was Lying!
- The World of Animals
- The Splendour in the Skies
- The World of Our Little Friends: The Ants
- Honeybees That Build Perfect Combs
- Skillful Dam Builders: Beavers

== Booklets ==
- "The Mystery of the Atom"
- "The Collapse of the Theory of Evolution: The Fact of Creation"
- "The Collapse of Materialism"
- "The End of Materialism"
- "The Blunders of Evolutionists 1"
- "The Blunders of Evolutionists 2"
- "The Microbiological Collapse of Evolution"
- "The Fact of Creation"
- "The Collapse of the Theory of Evolution in 20 Questions"
- "The Biggest Deception in the History of Biology: Darwinism"

== Works on Quranic topics ==
- The Basic Concepts in the Qur'an
- The Moral Values of the Qur'an
- Quick Grasp of Faith 1-2-3
- Ever Thought About the Truth?
- Crude Understanding of Disbelief
- Devoted to Allah
- Abandoning the Society of Ignorance
- The Real Home of Believers: Paradise
- Knowledge of the Qur'an
- Qur'an Index
- Emigrating for the Cause of Allah
- The Character of the Hypocrite in the Qur'an
- The Secrets of the Hypocrite
- The Names of Allah
- Communicating the Message and Disputing in the Qur'an
- Answers from the Qur'an
- Death Resurrection Hell
- The Struggle of the Messengers
- The Avowed Enemy of Man: Satan
- The Greatest Slander: Idolatry
- The Religion of the Ignorant
- The Arrogance of Satan
- Prayer in the Qur'an
- The Importance of Conscience in the Qur'an
- The Day of Resurrection
- Never Forget
- Disregarded Judgements of the Qur'an
- Human Characters in the Society of Ignorance
- The Importance of Patience in the Qur'an
- General Information from the Qur'an
- The Mature Faith
- Before You Regret
- Our Messengers Say
- The Mercy of Believers
- The Fear of Allah
- The Nightmare of Disbelief
- Jesus Will Return
- Beauties Presented by the Qur'an for Life
- A Bouquet of the Beauties of Allah 1-2-3-4
- The Iniquity Called "Mockery"
- The Mystery of the Test
- The True Wisdom According to the Qur'an
- The Struggle with the Religion of Irreligion
- The School of Yusuf
- The Alliance of the Good
- Slanders Spread Against Muslims Throughout History
- The Importance of Following the Good Word
- Why Do You Deceive Yourself?
- Islam: The Religion of Ease
- Enthusiasm and Excitement in the Qur'an
- Seeing Good in Everything
- How does the Unwise Interpret the Qur'an?
- Some Secrets of the Qur'an
- The Courage of Believers
- Being Hopeful in the Qur'an
- Justice and Tolerance in the Qur'an
- Basic Tenets of Islam
- Those Who do not Listen to the Qur'an
