= A9 =

A9, A.9, A09, A 9 or A-9 may refer to:

== Science ==
- ATC code A09 Digestives, including enzymes, a subgroup of the Anatomical Therapeutic Chemical Classification System
- Biolimus A9, an immunosuppressant
- British NVC community A9, the Potamogeton natans community, one of the aquatic communities of the British National Vegetation Classification
- HLA-A9, a broad antigen serogroup of Human MHC HLA-A
- Subfamily A9, a Rhodopsin-like receptors subfamily

== Technology ==
- A9home, a small form factor computer
- A9.com, a website and search engine by Amazon.com
- Apple A9, a 64-bit system on a chip (SoC) designed by Apple Inc.
- Hanlin eReader A9, an ebook reader

== Aviation ==
- Breda A.9, a 1928 Italian biplane trainer aircraft
- CallAir A-9 Quail, an agricultural aircraft
- Georgian Airways's IATA code
- Lockheed A-9, a ground attack aircraft based on the Lockheed YP-24 fighter prototype
- Northrop YA-9, a ground-attack aircraft that competed with the Fairchild Republic A-10 Thunderbolt II

== Military ==
- A9, a military staff designation in the continental staff system
- A 9, a Swedish artillery regiment
- A9, a model of German Aggregate Series Rocket from World War II
- Cruiser Mk I (A9), a British tank

== Music ==
- A9 (band), a Japanese rock band originally named Alice Nine
- A-9, a Gibson mandolin guitar model

== Other uses ==
- A9 (classification), an amputee sport classification
- A9 road, in several countries; see List of A9 roads
- A9, an international ISO 216 paper size standard (37×52 mm)
- A-9 Vigilance, a fictional starfighter from the Star Wars universe
- Arrows A9, a 1986 British racing car
- HMNZS Manawanui (A09), a 1988 diving support vessel for the Royal New Zealand Navy
- HMS A9, an A-class submarine of the Royal Navy
- Réti Opening, a chess opening with the code A09 in the Encyclopedia of Chess Openings
- A9 TV, a Turkish television station
- Chery Fulwin A9, a mid-size sedan
- Samsung Galaxy A9, an Android-based smartphone by Samsung

== See also ==
- Grumman Gooseor Grumman OA-9, "Goose" amphibious aircraft in USAAC service
- α9 (disambiguation)
- 9A (disambiguation)
