= Veli Saçılık =

Turkish sociologist, activist, and author

- Born: 1977 (age 48–49); Çorum, Turkey
- Education: Anadolu University
- Occupations: Sociologist, author
- Parent(s): Cemal Saçılık; Kezban Saçılık

Veli Saçılık (born 1977) is a Turkish sociologist, activist, and author.

== Biography ==
Saçılık, who lost one of his arms at the demolishing of a prison wall by a bulldozer during the "Return to Life Operation" in Burdur Prison on 5 July 2000, started to work as a civil servant at Çankaya Population Directorate. Then he studied sociology and started to work as a sociologist in Ankara Provincial Directorate of Ministry of Labour and Social Security.

He was expelled from his job following the 2016 Turkish coup d'état attempt, after which a state of emergency (OHAL) was declared. He later joined the protests organized by Nuriye Gülmen and Semih Özakça, both of whom had lost their jobs following the coup attempt. Saçılık was subjected to physical violence and taken into custody many times during this period.

During the 2018 Turkish parliamentary election, he was the candidate of HDP for Ankara's 3rd district but did not succeed in entering the parliament.

As of 2019, Saçılık is a writer for Yeni Yaşam newspaper.
