= List of strikes in Turkey =

Throughout the history of Turkey, a number of strikes and labour disputes have occurred.

== Background ==
A labour strike is a work stoppage caused by the mass refusal of employees to work. This can include wildcat strikes, which are done without union authorisation, and slowdown strikes, where workers reduce their productivity while still carrying out minimal working duties. It is usually a response to employee grievances, such as low pay or poor working conditions. Strikes can also occur to demonstrate solidarity with workers in other workplaces or pressure governments to change policies.

== 20th century ==
=== 1920s ===
- 1927 Adana Railway Strike

=== 1980s ===
- 1989 Turkish steelworkers' strike
- 1989 prisoners' hunger strike in Turkey, in protest against prison conditions.

=== 1990s ===
- 1994–95 Turkish public sector strikes, series of strikes by public sector workers in Turkey over wages.
- 1996 prisoners' hunger strike in Turkey

== 21st century ==
=== 2000s ===
- 2000–03 prisoners' hunger strike in Turkey
- Istanbul metalworkers' strike of 2008–2009

=== 2010s ===
- 2011–2012 Kurdish protests in Turkey
- Hunger strikes in Turkey (2016–2017)
- Istanbul Airport protests, in 2018.

== See also ==
- Trade unions in Turkey
- Turkish labour law
