= Education in Ankara =

Ankara Education

Education in Ankara is primarily provided by public schools and private schools. Compulsory education lasts 12 years. Ankara is the center of education in Turkey. Many foundations such as Ministry of National Education, Council of Higher Education and Education and Science Workers' Union is centered in the city.

== Primary and secondary education ==
Numbers of schools, students, teachers and classrooms in Ankara in 2017-2018
| | Number of schools | | | Number of students | | | Number of teachers | | | Number of classrooms | | | Students per classroom | |
| | Public | Private | Total | Public | Private | Total | Public | Private | Total | Public | Private | Total | Public | Private |
|---|---|---|---|---|---|---|---|---|---|---|---|---|---|---|
| Pre-primary education | 112 | 375 | 487 | 54.341 | 19.939 | 74.280 | 3.531 | 1.482 | 5.013 | 1.968 | 2.143 | 4.111 | 28 | 9 |
| Primary education | 621 | 200 | 821 | 271.562 | 30.694 | 302.256 | 15.350 | 3.709 | 19.059 | 10.052 | 3.045 | 13.097 | 27 | 10 |
| Middle school | 579 | 212 | 791 | 282.482 | 36.604 | 319.086 | 17.936 | 4.314 | 2.250 | 8.472 | 3.000 | 11.472 | 33 | 12 |
| General high schools | 150 | 293 | 443 | 95.348 | 50.151 | 145.499 | 7.040 | 6.899 | 13.939 | 3.623 | 4.523 | 8.146 | 26 | 11 |
| Vocational high schools | 215 | 47 | 262 | 101.952 | 11.278 | 113.230 | 10.672 | 1.063 | 11.735 | 3.747 | 841 | 4.588 | 27 | 13 |
| Religious high schools | 64 | 0 | 64 | 22.621 | 0 | 22.621 | 2.284 | 0 | 2.284 | 1.564 | 0 | 1.564 | 14 | 0 |
| Total | 1.741 | 1.127 | 2.868 | 828.306 | 148.666 | 976.972 | 54.470 | 17.467 | 71.937 | 28.071 | 13.552 | 41.623 | 30 | 11 |

== Universities ==
There are 14 universities in Ankara, 7 of them are private and 7 of them are public. It is the city with highest number of universities in Turkey after Istanbul. Universities in Ankara include Gazi University which is the first university in history of Republic of Turkey, Middle East Technical University which is the first university in Turkey that taught a foreign language, Bilkent University which is the first private university in Turkey and Hacettepe University which is the most advanced university in Turkey in the field of medicine.

== Student dormitories ==
There are 32 public and 306 private student dormitories in Ankara. There were 27,225 students staying in public dormitories and 12,251 students staying in private dormitories in 2018. Eighty-two schools across the city have their own pensions and number of students staying in those pensions is 12,343.
