= İzmir Pride =

LGBTQ event in İzmir, Turkey

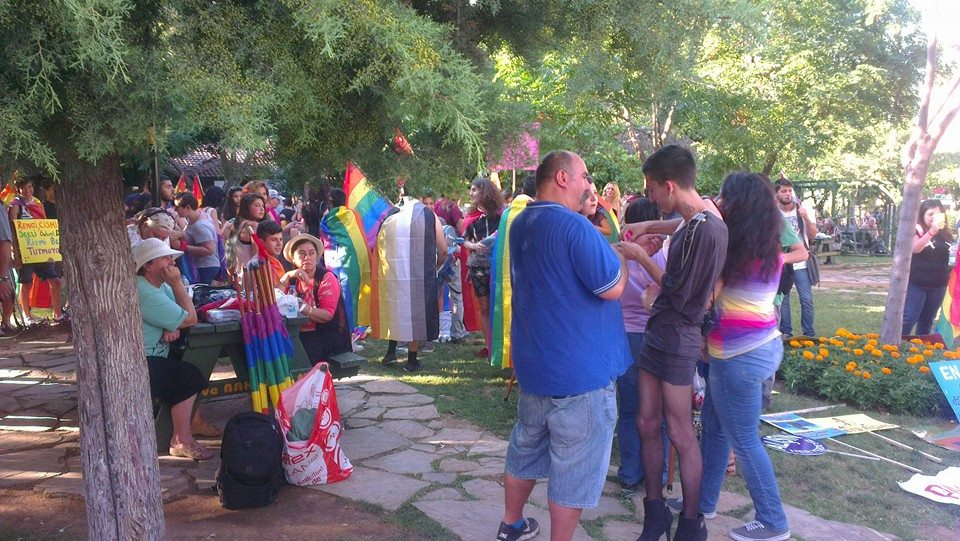
2014 İzmir Pride

İzmir Pride (Turkish: İzmir Onur Yürüyüşü) is a gay pride march and LGBTQ demonstration held annually in İzmir since 2013.

== History ==
LGBT supporters gathered at Alsancak Ferry Port during the march on 30 June 2013 and walked along Cyprus Martyrs Street, carrying posters with slogans such as "We are soldiers of Zeki Müren" and "We are soldiers of Freddie Mercury". The event went forward again in 2014.

In 2016 the provincial government cancelled the event, claiming there would be "terror propaganda". The event did go ahead as planned, although with fewer attendees.

Honor Week events in 2019 were banned by the Governorship of İzmir. The İzmir Bar Association applied to the court to suspend the execution of the ban on the grounds that it was unlawful. The court eventually issued a decision to stop the execution of the ban. With this decision, it was announced that the İzmir Pride march would take place for the seventh time on June 22. However, the police intervened in the march and detained more than twenty people.

A dozen people were detained at the event in 2022.

== Supporters and organizers ==
- Dokuz Eylül University Equal Ribbon Community
- Ege University LGBTQ Community
- Eğitim-Sen İzmir LGBTQ Commission No. 2
- Red Rainbow İzmir
- HDK İzmir LGBTQ Commission
- İzmir LGBTQ Initiative
- Black Pink Triangle
- Ahura LGBTQ
- İzmir Bar Association
