= Hunger strikes in Turkey (2016–2017) =

Several hunger strikes were undertaken in Turkey from 2016 to 2017.

== Background ==
In Turkey, the hunger strike has been used as a form of resistance historically, however, it was not until after the coup of September 12, 1980, that hunger strikes were recognised as a national issue in Turkey when a hunger strike was held at Diyarbakir Prison to protest inhumane practices in the prison. Other large-scale hunger strikes include one that took place at Buca Prison in 1996, in which 12 prisoners died, and another that began in October 2000 in prisons throughout the country to oppose the construction and transfer of prisoners to F-type prisons, which are high-security and isolate prisoners from lawyers, families, and other outsiders, and in which 107 people died by the middle of 2003.

== Hunger strike in 2016 ==
=== Claim for return of family's body in Sur ===
In August 2015, after the ceasefire between Turkish government and Kurdistan Workers party (PKK) has broken down in July, Kurdish activists declared a "self-rule zone" in Sur in Diyarbakir. This resulted in heavy clashes between the Turkish security forces and Kurdish militants and 24,000 residents in Sur were displaced, and a number of civilians were killed During the clash, a strict curfew was implemented by the Turkish security forces which made the citizen difficult to flee from the clash.

Since January 2016, the families of those who were killed during the clashes claimed the return of their families’ bodies, which remained in the street for days, and started a hunger strike. This included the family of Ramazan Ogut, Mesut Seviktek and Isa Oran, who were militants of the Patriotic Revolutionary Youth (YDG-H), and Rozerin Cukur, who was believed as a civilian.

It was reported that Mesut Seviktek and Isa Oran were killed on 23 December 2015 in the midst of the clash between Turkish security forces and Kurdish militants. However, their bodies were not handed over to their families, which led the families to start a hunger strike at Human Rights' Association office on 2 January 2016. On 19 January 2016, after 18 days of hunger strike, Diyarbakir Governor's Office informed to Human Rights Association that their bodies were dispatched to Gazi Yaşargil Training and Research Hospital and their families identified the bodies, which were damaged. Their burial was allowed on 22 January and thousands of people joined the march for their farewell. The family of Ramazan Ogut, who was killed on 30 December 2015 and the family of Rozerin Çukur, who was killed on 8 January 2016 also joined the hunger strike in January 2016. The body of Ogut was recognised in May by a DNA test and buried on 3 June 2016. On 1 March, it is reported that the father of Rozerin Cukur would go on death fast unless the body of his daughter was returned to the family within the same week. On 6 June 2016, her body was retrieved to her family from Gazi Yaşargil Training and Research Hospital.

=== Request for meeting with political figure in jail ===
On 1 September 2016, 50 members of Kurdish leading parties announced that they would start a hunger strike if they could not confirm the information about the welfare and safety of Abdullah Öcalan, who was a founder of PKK and was jailed in 1999. According to the members, no one was able to see him since April 2015, while his leadership was important for the peace negotiation for the conflicts between Turkish and Kurdish forces, and claimed for the meeting between Öcalan and lawyers or his family. The 50 members started a hunger strike on 5 September 2016. On 10 September 2016, Turkey allowed the family of Öcalan to visit him and his brother, Mehmet Öcalan visited him on 11 September 2016. Öcalan left his comment through his brother that Turkey should restart the peace negotiation with Kurdish forces. On 12 September 2016, the 50 members announced that their strike was ended as their demands were met.

== Hunger strike in 2017 ==
=== Protest against dismissal by academia ===
After the failure of 2016 Turkish coup d'état attempt, the Turkish government declared a state of emergency, which continued until July 2018 and allowed the government to purge the member of Islamic groups who were accused of planning the coup d'état from the position of the government. In addition to this, based on the degree-laws which were enacted after the coup, almost 150,000 civil servants were dismissed without any jurisprudential oversight, which included 41,705 employees from the educational field. To claim the job back, Nuriye Gülmen, who was dismissed from her job at Eskisehir Osmangazi University started the protest in front of the Human Rights Monument on Yuksel Street, in Ankara on 9 November 2016. This resistance activity spread to other provinces of the country, despite multiple interventions from the police, including detentions. However, as the government did not respond to their protests, on 9 March 2017, Nurie Gülmen and Semih Ôzakça, who were the symbol of the activity, started a hunger strike, which continued until 26 January 2018.

== See also ==
- Hunger strike
- Timeline of the Kurdish–Turkish conflict (2015–present)
- 2016 Turkish coup d'état attempt
- Abdullah Öcalan
- Nuriye Gülmen
- Semih Ôzakça
