= Education and Science Workers' Union =

Education and Science Workers' Union may refer to:

- Education and Science Workers' Union (Germany)
- Education and Science Workers' Union (Turkey)
