= Alpha 9 =

Alpha 9 (α9) or Alpha-9 (α-9) may refer to:

- Alpha 9 (Robert Silverberg anthology), a science fiction anthology edited by Robert Silverberg first published in 1978
- Minolta α-9, a professional A-mount 35mm SLR by Minolta in 1998, also known as Dynax 9 / Maxxum 9
- Minolta α-9Ti, a limited edition professional A-mount 35mm SLR by Minolta in 1999, also known as Dynax 9Ti / Maxxum 9Ti
- Sony α9, a professional E-mount digital full-frame camera by Sony in 2017
- Arty (musician), alias Alpha 9

== See also ==
- A9 (disambiguation)
- Alpha (disambiguation)
