= 9A =

9A or 9-A may refer to:

- Gemini 9A, a 1966 human spaceflight
- Airco DH.9A, a 1918 British light bomber
- 9A-91, a carbine assault rifle currently in use with Russian police forces
- 9-a-side footy, a sport based on Australian rules football
- IATA code of Air Atlantic
- The Ninth Amendment to the United States Constitution

== See also ==
- List of highways numbered 9A
- A9 (disambiguation)
