= Nuriye Gülmen =

Turkish academic

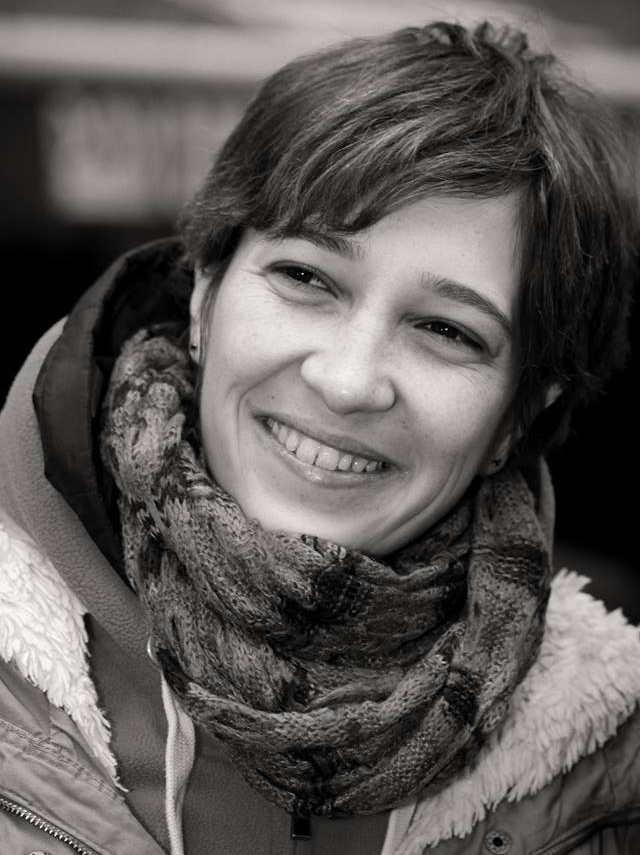
- Nuriye Gülmen in 2017
- Born: 24 November 1982 (age 43); Kütahya, Turkey
- Education: Eskişehir Osmangazi University; Bilkent University
- Occupations: Academician, activist

Nuriye Gülmen (born 24 November 1982) is a Turkish academician and activist.

While working for Selçuk University within the scope of the Faculty Member Training Program (ÖYP), Gülmen was appointed to the Eskişehir Osmangazi University. There, she was a research assistant at the Department of Comparative Literature. She won a lawsuit filed against the university's management for not renewing her contract and later started to work at Selçuk University.

One day after her appointment, she was expelled from the university following the 2016 Turkish coup d'état attempt, after which a state of emergency (OHAL) was declared. As a result Gülmen faced allegations and was accused of being a member of the "Fethullahçı Terrorist Organization / Parallel State Structure" (FETÖ/PDY). On 9 November 2016, in front of the Human Rights Monument on Yüksel Street in Ankara, she started a movement with the motto 'I Want My Job Back' to return to her lost job. Gülmen was detained dozens of times during the protests, and finally she went on a hunger strike with her fellow teacher Semih Özakça. During this period, Gülmen's weight fell from 59 kilos to 34 kilos and she ended the hunger strike on 26 January 2018 after the OHAL Commission rejected the objection regarding the issuance of the Decree Law.

CNN International named Nuriye Gülmen among the eight leading women of 2016.

Nuriye Gülmen was jailed on August 11

On 28 November 2020, Nuriye Gulmen's union Egitim Sen voted to expel her from the union.

== Judicial process ==
On 22 June 2017, Nuriye Gülmen and Semih Özakça applied to the Constitutional Court of Turkey with the request for lifting their detention, as they had started to suffer from health issues due to the hunger strike. On 28 June, the Constitutional Court unanimously rejected the application by Gülmen and Özakça. In its response, the Court stated that "there was no situation requiring an immediate injunction to terminate the applicants' detention as there was not any threat available to pose a danger to their lives, their material or moral integrity". In addition, Gülmen and Özakça's health conditions since the day they were brought to prison was monitored b physicians, and attempts to refer to them to a hospital for further control was rejected by Gülmen and Özakça, yet measures were taken for emergencies and treatment at the prison's hospital.

At the sixth hearing of the case, Nuriye Gülmen was sentenced to six years and three months in prison for "membership of an armed terrorist organization", but was subsequently released from prison.

=== Appeal to ECHR ===
Gülmen, together with Semih Özakça, applied to the European Court of Human Rights (ECHR) on 29 June 2017, demanding that they be released due to their health problems as a result of a hunger strike and adding that detention conditions worsened their health. On 2 August 2017, the European Court of Human Rights dismissed the application, which was submitted as a precautionary measure by Gülmen and Özakça's lawyers. The ECHR ruled in its rejection that "in the light of the medical reports and other information submitted to the court, the fact that Özakça and Gülmen were detained at the Sincan State Hospital did not constitute a real and immediate danger to the applicants' life." The court also invited Gülmen and Özakça to end the hunger strike.

Şebnem Korur Fincancı, who participated in the examination and medical documentation process as a single physician and presented a 32-page report, reacted by explaining what happened during the examination and certification process on her Twitter account and criticized the lack of reference to this medical document in making the decision: "All doctors say there is a life-threatening need for care, but they respond they can be kept unattended in the prison hospital. On top of that, lawyers call on people who are mentally competent to end the hunger strike and they say, "The state takes good care of you". There is a lot of detail, but even so I think it can clearly show how the whole process is loaded with human rights violations. There is no single reference to a total of 32-page examination, medical documentation, and scientific opinions with many scientifically tortured diagnoses."

== Demands ==
Following the decree law numbered 679 was issued as a result of the state of emergency declared after the July 15 coup attempt, Nuriye Gülmen started a protest in front of the Human Rights Monument on Yüksel Street in Ankara, demanding the following:

1. End the state of emergency.
2. Let the revolutionary democratic public laborers, who were fired and dismissed, be returned to work.
3. Arbitrary and unlawful dismissal should be stopped.
4. Restore the staff assurance for 13 thousand ÖYP research assistants.
5. Science cannot be made without job security, we want job security for all education and science workers.

== Claims ==
On 25 May 2017, Interior Minister Süleyman Soylu claimed that Nuriye Gülmen and Semih Özakça were "members of the DHKP-C terrorist organization" and that their actions were supported by this organization and that they had a direct link to DHKP-C. Following Soylu's claim, lawyer Selçuk Kozağaçlı published Nuriye Gülmen and Semih Özakça's criminal record which showed that they had no connection to any terrorist organizations. On top of that, the Ministry of Interior Research and Studies Center published a 54-page booklet titled "The Unending Scenario of a Terrorist Organization, Nuriye Gülmen and Semih Özakça Truth". The booklet claimed that 12 lawsuits were filed against Nuriye Gülmen, all of these cases were related to the terrorist organization, and one of them resulted in conviction and was pending the Supreme Court's decision. The Cumhuriyet newspaper claimed that the booklet had contained evidence for other cases that had not yet been finalized and were still pending before the Supreme Court.
