= Istanbul Airport protests =

2018 labor protests

Istanbul Airport protests was a protest initiated by construction workers on 14 September 2018 due to poor working conditions during the construction of Istanbul Airport. The Construction and Construction Workers' Union (İYİ-SEN) announced on its Twitter account the action that started at the construction site of the airport construction, which was tried to be opened on 29 October. Workers gathered in front of the construction site in the morning and expressed their reactions by preventing the exit of the services. It was stated that the food and shelter facilities at the construction site were bad and the deaths and injuries that occurred during work accidents were kept from the public. The workers, who took action, prepared a 15-item request to the management and submitted it to the management.

== Reasons ==
In the construction of Istanbul New Airport, where approximately 40 thousand workers are employed and whose name has been frequently discussed with work accidents, related worker deaths and food problems, the workers protested the working conditions and made a stop-action on the morning of 14 September 2018. The Construction and Construction Workers Union (İYİ-SEN) announced the action that started at the construction site of the airport construction, which was tried to be opened on 29 October, with the following words on its Twitter account:

"WE ARE IN ACTION AT THE 3rd AIRPORT We started the action this morning due to the insufficient services used by the workers in the construction site at the 3rd Airport."

In the press release published on Facebook on 13 September, "the inadequacy of the services used by the workers, waiting for the service in the rain, deprivation of the most basic rights such as shelter, nutrition and transportation" was cited as the reason for the action.

== Events ==
The workers gathered in front of the administration building at 06:30 in the morning of 14 September and demanded that their working conditions be improved. Thereupon, the owners of the companies responsible for the construction informed the law enforcement officers and the gendarmerie teams and TOMAs who came to the scene around 11:30 intervened to the workers. When there was no consensus in the first talks between the company and the workers, the workers decided to continue the action and presented a 15-item list of demands.

Entrances to the area were prohibited by the Istanbul Governorship. DİSK banned the administrators from entering. Journalists, lawyers and deputies were not allowed into the action zone and areas where detained workers were. Veli Ağbaba, who was in the delegation whose entrance was blocked, stated that there were very serious allegations at the airport, and that most of those who died at the construction site lacked helmets and seat belts.

The Ministry of Transport likened the events to the Gezi Park protests and said, "The 3rd Airport is Turkey's pride project, no one will be able to stop it and it will open on October 29."

The Construction and Construction Workers Union announced on its Twitter account on 22 September that food shortages continue.

=== Detentions and arrests ===
On 15 September 2018, around 02:15, the gendarmerie units raided the area where the workers were staying and 543 workers and union representatives were taken into custody. 24 workers were arrested on the grounds that they tried to prevent the intervention of the law enforcement by shouting slogans during the gendarmerie raid and they formed a WhatsApp group called "Direniş Grubu". On 27 September, three workers who protested the lack of shuttle services despite heavy rain and wind were arrested and the number of detained airport workers rose to 27.

== Demands ==
The first demands made by the workers included the following items;

1. Participants in the action will not be dismissed.
2. Unannounced dismissals will be reinstated.
3. The service issue will be resolved.
4. It will be ensured that the dormitories, sinks and bathrooms are cleaned regularly and the bed bug problem will be solved.
5. It will be ensured that the infirmary personnel take care of the workers.
6. It will be ensured that all salaries are deposited into the account and no salary is paid in person.
7. Unpaid wages will be paid.
8. It will be ensured that workers and foremen eat in the same cafeteria.
9. A promise will be made to avoid the same grievances.
10. Articles will be read in the presence of the press.
11. Occupational homicides will be solved.
12. Those who have not received a salary for 6 months will be paid their salaries.
13. Food and holiday bonuses will be given.
14. An offending chief will be fired.
15. Worker uniforms will be provided.

== Support ==
Making a joint statement regarding the protest, DİSK, KESK, TMMOB and TTB said, "The detained workers should be released immediately and all demands of the workers must be met." He gave support to the workers by using his statements. ITUC declared that "we condemn the detention of workers protesting unsafe and inhumane working conditions" and called on the government to meet their demands as soon as possible. In the report published by the Human Rights Association, in addition to the bad working conditions and the violation of the legislation, it was stated that it remains on the agenda with work murders, and the workers who object to the situation and demand the improvement of the conditions instead of taking measures to solve the problems, and their employers who try to support the workers and their employers are detained with the cooperation of the state and tried to be silenced. A support action was held in Kocaeli for the workers. Republican People's Party, Labor Movement Party, Labor Party, Peoples' Democratic Party and Freedom and Solidarity Party supported the workers and called for the demands to be met. On the cover of its 577th issue of the weekly humor magazine, Uykusuz, it was about the airport workers and the writers targeting the workers.
