= A9 TV =

Turkish television network

- Country: Turkey
- Broadcast area: Turksat 4A
- Network: A9 Televizyonu Dijital Yayıncılık Sanayi ve Ticaret A.Ş.

Programming
- Language: Turkish
- Picture format: 16:9 (576i, SDTV)

History
- Launched: March 21, 2011
- Closed: July 11, 2018

Links
- Website: A9 TV

A9 TV was a Turkish television station that started broadcasting on March 21, 2011 via Turksat satellite television channel broadcasting. Much of the programming includes religious and English language content, with an emphasis on creationism over evolution and Darwinism. A substantial amount of content features Islamic creationist and cult leader Adnan Oktar (also known as Harun Yahya). In 2018, the channel was fined several times by the country's broadcasting regulator Radio and Television Supreme Council (RTÜK).

A9 TV was shut down after its founder, Adnan Oktar, was convicted of ten distinct charges, including leading a criminal gang, rape, engaging in political and military espionage, blackmail, sexual abuse of minors and causing torment.

== Shows ==
- Harun Yahya documentaries
- Adnan Oktar'ın sohbet programları (Adnan Oktar's talk shows) (Turkish, English)
- Building Bridges (features opinion leaders from around the world)
- Ahir Zaman ve Yaratılış Delilleri (The End Times and the evidence of Creation)
- İttihad-ı İslam (Islamic Union)
- Adil Yargı
- Documentaries for Children
- A9 Ana Haber (Refik Sarıöz)
