= Semih Özakça =

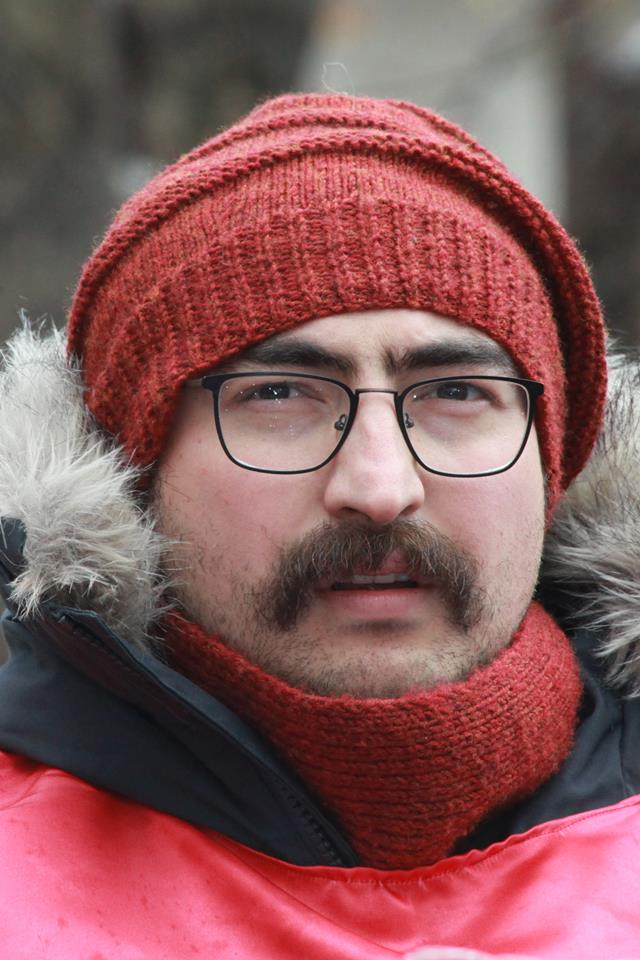
- Semih Özakça in 2017
- Born: 1989 (age 36–37); Eskişehir, Turkey
- Education: Sinop University
- Occupations: Teacher, activist
- Spouse: Esra Özakça

Semih Özakça (born 1989) is a Turkish teacher and activist.

Özakça was a teacher at Mardin Mazıdağı Cumhuriyet Primary School. He was expelled from his job following the 2016 Turkish coup d'état attempt, after which a state of emergency (OHAL) was declared. Similarly, the academic Nuriye Gülmen, who was dismissed as a result of the Decree Law, started a protest in front of the Human Rights Monument on Yüksel Street in Ankara to take her job back and Özakça joined her on 23 November 2016. He later started a hunger strike with Gülmen. During this period, Özakça's weight fell from 86 kilos to 45 kilos and he ended the hunger strike on 26 January 2018 after the OHAL Commission rejected the objection regarding the issuance of the Decree Law.

== Judicial process ==
On 22 June 2017, Semih Özakça and Nuriye Gülmen applied to the Constitutional Court of Turkey with the request for lifting their detention, as they had started to suffer from health issues due to the hunger strike. On 28 June, the Constitutional Court unanimously rejected the application by Özakça and Gülmen. In its response, the Court stated that "there was no situation requiring an immediate injunction to terminate the applicants' detention as there was not any threat available to pose a danger to their lives, their material or moral integrity". Gülmen and Özakça's health conditions in prison were monitored by physicians, and attempts to refer to them to a hospital for further control were rejected by Gülmen and Özakça, although measures were taken for emergencies and treatment at the prison's hospital.

On 20 October 2017, following a court hearing in Ankara, Özakça was released on condition of wearing electronic handcuffs.

At the sixth hearing of the case, Semih Özakça was acquitted of all the charges against which he was tried.

=== Appeal to ECHR ===
Özakça, together with Nuriye Gülmen, applied to the European Court of Human Rights (ECHR) on 29 June 2017, demanding that they be released due to their health problems as a result of a hunger strike and adding that detention conditions worsened their health. On 2 August 2017, the European Court of Human Rights dismissed the application, which was submitted as a precautionary measure by Özakça and Gülmen's lawyers. The ECHR ruled in its rejection that "in the light of the medical reports and other information submitted to the court, the fact that Özakça and Gülmen were detained at the Sincan State Hospital did not constitute a real and immediate danger to the applicants' life." The court also invited Gülmen and Özakça to end the hunger strike.

Şebnem Korur Fincancı, who participated in the examination and medical documentation process as a single physician and presented a 32-page report, reacted by explaining what happened during the examination and certification process on her Twitter account and criticized the lack of reference to this medical document in making the decision: "All doctors say there is a life-threatening need for care, but they respond they can be kept unattended in the prison hospital. On top of that, lawyers call on people who are mentally competent to end the hunger strike and they say, "The state takes good care of you". There is a lot of detail, but even so I think it can clearly show how the whole process is loaded with human rights violations. There is no single reference to a total of 32-page examination, medical documentation, and scientific opinions with many scientifically tortured diagnoses."

== Claims ==
On 25 May 2017, Interior Minister Süleyman Soylu claimed that Semih Özakça and Nuriye Gülmen were "members of the DHKP-C terrorist organization" and that their actions were supported by this organization and that they had a direct link to DHKP-C. Following Soylu's claim, lawyer Selçuk Kozağaçlı published Nuriye Gülmen and Semih Özakça's criminal record which showed that they had no connection to any terrorist organizations. On top of that, the Ministry of Interior Research and Studies Center published a 54-page booklet titled "The Unending Scenario of a Terrorist Organization, Nuriye Gülmen and Semih Özakça Truth". In the booklet, Özakça is accused of being "a member of an armed terrorist organization", "causing damage to public property", "deliberately injuring himself to cause fractures", and "spreading the propaganda of a terrorist organization", and was claimed to have four cases against him in the civil courts at the time. The Cumhuriyet newspaper claimed that the booklet had contained evidence for other cases that had not yet been finalized and were still pending before the Supreme Court.
