= A9 (classification) =

Amputee sports classification

A9 is an amputee sport classification used by the International Sports Organization for the Disabled (ISOD).for people with acquired or congenital amputations. People in this class have combination of amputations of the upper and lower extremities. Their amputations impact their sport performance, including energy costs, balance and potential for overuse of muscles. Sports people in this class are eligible to participate in include athletics, swimming, sitting volleyball, amputee basketball, lawn bowls, sitzball and wheelchair basketball.

== Definition ==
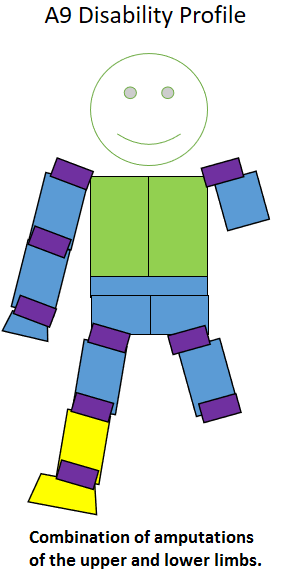
Type of amputation for an A9 classified sportsperson.

A9 is an amputee sports classification for people who have a combination of amputations of the upper and lower extremities. In competing in some sports, this class may have a different name:

Class	Athletics	Skiing	Swimming	Comparable classifications in other sports	Ref
A9	T42, T43, T44, F42, F43, F44, F56, F57, F58	LW9.1, LW9.2	S2, S3, S4, S5	Amputee basketball: Open. Lawn bowls: LB1, LB2. Sitting volleyball: Open. Sitzball: Open. Ten-pin bowling: TPB8, TPB9. Wheelchair basketball: 2 point player, 3 point player, 4 point player.	

== Performance and physiology ==
The nature of a person's amputations in this class can affect their physiology and sports performance. Because of the potential for balance issues related to having an amputation, during weight training, amputees are encouraged to use a spotter when lifting more than 15 pounds (6.8 kg). Lower limb amputations affect a person's energy cost for being mobile. To keep their oxygen consumption rate similar to people without lower limb amputations, they need to walk slower. Because they are missing a limb, amputees are more prone to overuse injuries in their remaining limbs. Common problems with intact upper limbs for people in this class include rotator cuffs tearing, shoulder impingement, epicondylitis and peripheral nerve entrapment.

== Governance ==
This classification was set up by ISOD, with the current version adopted in 1992 and then modified in 1993. IWAS was created following the merger of ISOD and International Stoke Mandeville Games Federation (ISMGF) in 2005. Subsequently, IWAS became the classification governing body for some amputee sports.

== Sports ==
=== Athletics ===
For athletics competitions that use the IPC athletics classification system, this class competes in T42, T43, T44, F42, F43, F44, F56, and F57. The shank length of people in this class can differ dramatically, and is not uniform across the class.

A study of was done comparing the performance of athletics competitors at the 1984 Summer Paralympics. It found there was no significant difference in performance in distances between men in the A3, A4, A5, A6, A7, A8 and A9 in the discus, men in A1, A2, A3, A4, A5, A6, A7, A8 and A9 in the javelin, and men in A8 and A9 in the shot put.

In general, track athletes with amputations in this class should be considerate of the surface they are running on, and avoid asphalt and cinder tracks.

=== Basketball ===
The wheelchair basketball classification system used by the IWBF is open to people from this class. The class they play in will be specific to the location of their amputations and their lengths. Players with hip disarticulation in both legs are 3.0 point players while players with two slightly longer above the knee amputations are 3.5 point players. Players with one hip disarticulation may be 3.5 point players or 4 point players. People with amputations longer than 2/3rds the length of their thigh when wearing a prosthesis are generally 4.5 point players. Those with shorter amputations are 4 point players. At this point, the classification system for people in this class then considers the nature of the hand amputation by subtracting points to assign a person to a class. A wrist disarticulation moves a player down a point class while a pair of hand amputations moves a player down two point classes, with players with upper limb amputations ending up as low as a 1. point player. Despite wheelchair basketball having been around since the first Paralympic Games, amputee players from this class were first allowed to be classified and participate internationally in 1983 following the creation of a functional classification system in Cologne, Germany by Horst Strokhkendl. Players from this class first competed at the 1983 Gold Cup Championships.

There is a basketball variant called amputee basketball. It uses the ISOD classification system as to whom is eligible to participate, but it is open in terms of all eligible classes, including this one, can play. There is no point system for who is allowed on the floor at any given time like there is in wheelchair basketball.

=== Swimming ===
People with amputations are eligible to compete in swimming at the Paralympic Games. A9 swimmers may be found in several classes. These include S2, S3, S4, S5 and S8. Prior to the 1990s, this class was often grouped with other amputee classes in swimming competitions, including the Paralympic Games. Compared to able bodied swimmers, swimmers in this class have a shorter stroke length and increased stroke rate.

=== Other sports ===
Other sports people in this class are eligible to compete in include sitting volleyball and lawn bowls. A9 lawn bowlers can be classified as LB1 and LB2. Players have the choice to compete in sitting or standing. Sitzball, the precursor to sitting volleyball, is another available choice to play. It is open to A1 to A9 classified players along with anyone who might be classified as "les autres" or who have lesser amputations that would not qualify them for ISOD classification. It is not open to people with spinal cord injuries. Play is open, with no requirements as to which types of disabilities are on the court at any time. Ten pin bowling is also open to people in this class, where compete in the TPB8 class and TPB9 class.

== Becoming classified ==
Classification is often based on the anatomical nature of the amputation. The classification system takes several things into account when putting people into this class. These include which limbs are affected, how many limbs are affected, and how much of a limb is missing.

For this class, classification generally has four phases. The first stage of classification is a health examination. For amputees, this is often done on site at a sports training facility or competition. The second stage is observation in practice, the third stage is observation in competition and the last stage is assigning the sportsperson to a relevant class. Sometimes the health examination may not be done on site because the nature of the amputation could cause not physically visible alterations to the body. This is especially true for lower limb amputees as it relates to how their limbs align with their hips and the impact this has on their spine and how their skull sits on their spine.

During the observation phase involving training or practice for track and field, athletes in this class may be asked to demonstrate their skills in athletics, such as running, jumping or throwing. A determination is then made as to what classification an athlete should compete in. Classifications may be Confirmed or Review status. For athletes who do not have access to a full classification panel, Provisional classification is available; this is a temporary Review classification, considered an indication of class only, and generally used only in lower levels of competition.

For wheelchair basketball, part of the classification process involves observing a player during practice or training. This often includes observing them go one-on-one against someone who is likely to be in the same class the player would be classified into.
