= Shoaib Ahmed Malik =

Pakistani science and religion lecturer

Personal life
- Main interest(s): Intersection of theology and science
- Notable work(s): Islam and Evolution: Al-Ghazālī and the Modern Evolutionary Paradigm

Religious life
- Religion: Islam
- Denomination: Sunni
- Creed: Ash'ari

Muslim leader
- Influenced by: Al-Ghazali

Shoaib Ahmed Malik is a Pakistani lecturer in science and religion at the University of Edinburgh. He is an editorial board member of the journal Theology and Science and executive committee member of the International Society for Science and Religion. He is serving as the chief editor of Palgrave Macmillan's "Islam and Science" book series.

== Biography ==
Shoaib Ahmed Malik holds a bachelor of engineering (BEng) and a Master of Science (MSc) in science and religion. He earned his PhD in chemical engineering from the University of Nottingham and later obtained another PhD in theology from the University of St Mary's, Twickenham. Additionally, he holds a postgraduate certificate in education (PGCE).

Malik is a Fellow of the International Society for Science and Religion (FISSR) and a Senior Fellow of the Higher Education Academy (SFHEA).

== Works ==
As author

- Atheism and Islam: A Contemporary Discourse (2018)
- Islam and Evolution: Al-Ghazālī and the Modern Evolutionary Paradigm (2021)

Reviews:

Sayed, Farid (2022-05-25). "Book Review: Islam and Evolution: Al-Ghazālī and the Modern Evolutionary Paradigm by Shoaib Malik". Muslim Views.
Inloes, Amina (2022). "Review of Islam and Evolution". Journal of the Contemporary Study of Islam: 172–174. doi:10.37264/jcsi.v3i2.05.
Bigliardi, Stefano (2024-06-17). "Shoaib Ahmed Malik, "Islam and Evolution: Al-Ghazālī and the Modern Evolutionary Paradigm"". Philosophy in Review. 44 (2): 13–16. doi:10.7202/1112012ar. ISSN 1920-8936.
Yakubovych, Mykhaylo (2022-08-30). "Islam, Creationism and Evolutionism: Theoretical Contempolations. Ahmed Malik, S. (2021). Islam and Evolution: Al-Ghazālī and the Modern Evolutionary Paradigm". Sententiae. 41 (2): 177–180. doi:10.31649/sent41.02.177. ISSN 2308-8915.
Burney, Saleema F. (2023-10-02). "Shoaib Malik's "Islam and Evolution": Sociological Reflections on the Developing Engagement of British Muslim Leadership with Science". Theology and Science. 21 (4): 696–707. doi:10.1080/14746700.2023.2255952. ISSN 1474-6700.
Misbah, Muhammad; Setyaningrum, Anisah (2022-04-03). "Islam and Evolution: Al-Ghazālī and the Modern Evolutionary Paradigm". Theology and Science. 20 (2): 267–268. doi:10.1080/14746700.2022.2051258. ISSN 1474-6700.
Tradition, Traversing (2021-05-17). "Re-examining Evolution Through the Theological Lens of Ḥujjatul Islām". Traversing Tradition.
Aziz, Luthfi (2023-05-29). "Teori Evolusi dalam Pandangan Teologi Imam al-Ghazali -". Jakarta Book Review (JBR) (in Indonesian).

As editor

- Islamic Theology and Extraterrestrial Life: New Frontiers in Science and Religion (2024) with Jörg Matthias Determann
- Design Discourse in Abrahamic Traditions: History, Metaphysics, and Science (2024) with E.V.R. Kojonen
- New Frontiers in Islam and Evolution: Scriptures, Scholars, and Societies (2024) with David Solomon Jalajel
