= Samsung Galaxy A9 =

Samsung Galaxy A9 refers to three Samsung Galaxy Android smartphones released in the 2010s.

These are:

- Samsung Galaxy A9 (2016), Android smartphone released in 2015.
- Samsung Galaxy A9 Pro (2016), Android smartphone release in 2016.
- Samsung Galaxy A9 (2018), Android smartphone released in 2018.
- Samsung Galaxy A9 Star, the A8 Star's name in China.
