= Education and Science Workers' Union (Turkey) =

Turkish teachers union

Eğitim-Sen
- Education and Science Workers' Union
- Eğitim ve Bilim Emekçileri Sendikası
- Founded: January 23, 1995
- Headquarters: Ankara
- Location: Turkey
- Members: 200,000 (2005)
- Affiliations: KESK
- Website: www.egitimsen.org.tr

Education and Science Workers' Union (Turkish: Eğitim ve Bilim Emekçileri Sendikası), better known with its abbreviation Eğitim-Sen, is a left-wing trade union of teachers and other education workers in Turkey. In 2005, it had around 200,000 members and was Turkey's largest trade union.

It was founded on January 23, 1995, as a merger of Eğit-Sen and Eğitim-İş both founded in 1990. It is a member of KESK (Confederation of Public Employees Trade Unions, Education International the International Trade Union Confederation.

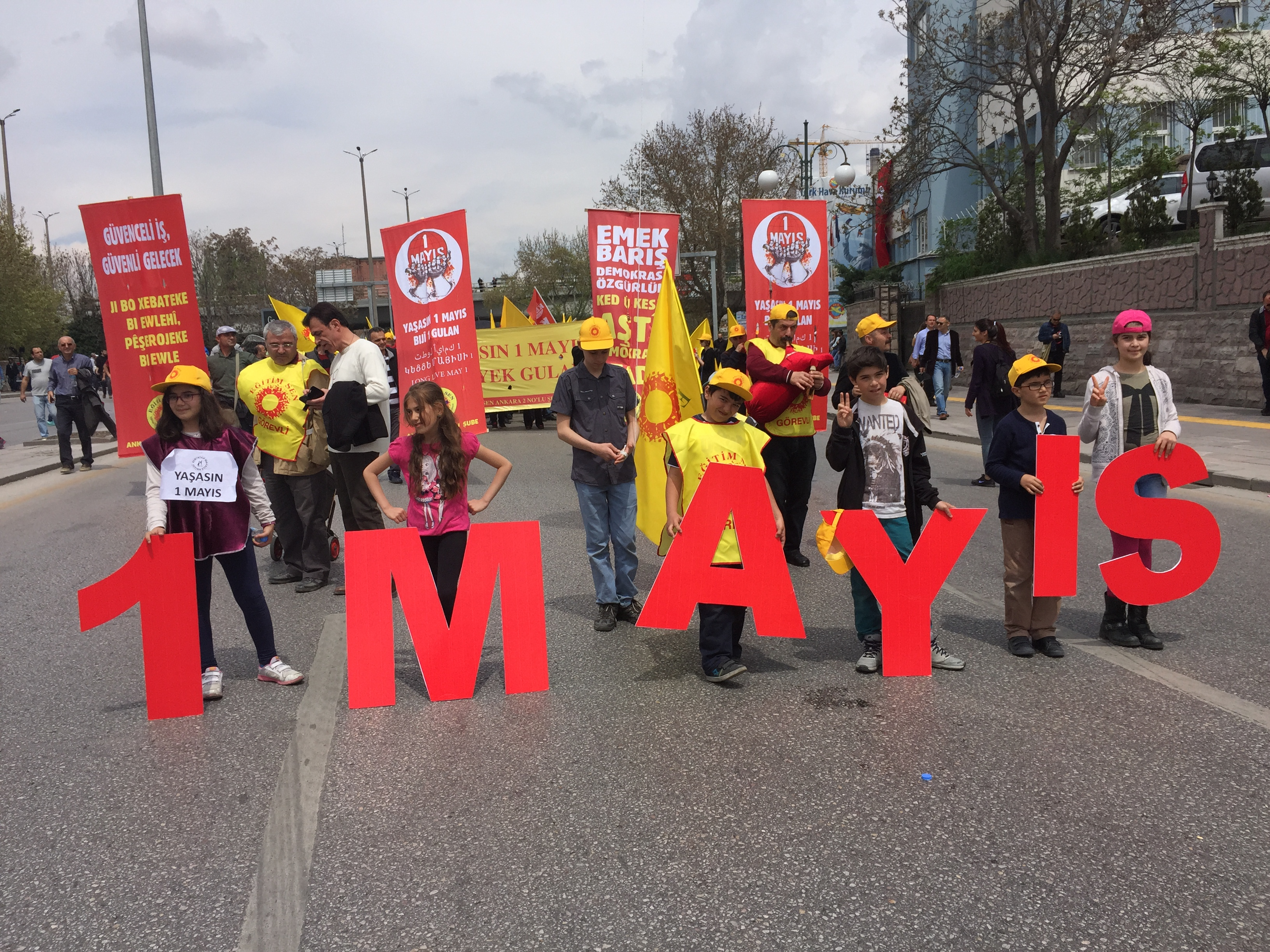
Eğitim-Sen supporters at May Day protests in Ankara, 2015.

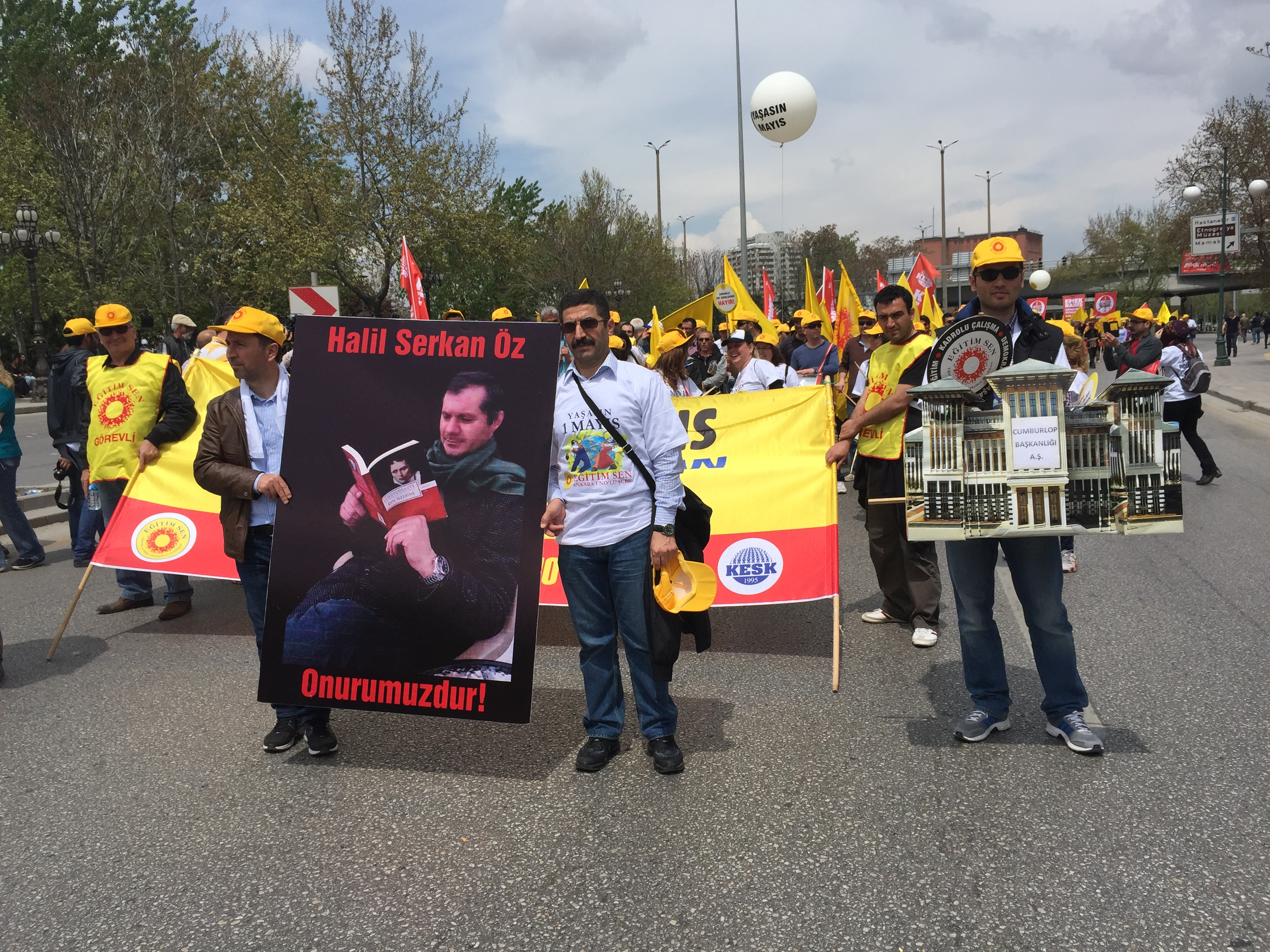
Eğitim-Sen supporters commemorating Halil Serkan Öz and criticizing the Ak Saray palace.

== Ban attempts ==
=== 2004 ===
In 2004, an attempt was initiated to shut down the organization by Attorney General of Ankara on the grounds that its statute contained the statement "...the defence [of the right] of individuals to receive education in their mother tongue", which was claimed to be against the Article 42 of the Constitution of Turkey which says that "No other language than Turkish may be taught in educational and teaching facilities to Turkish citizens as their mother tongue". The closure was demanded because Eğitim Sen refused to remove the phrase in question from its statute during the series of reforms associated with the aspiration of Turkey towards joining the European Union.

After a long and controversial litigation Eğitim Sen was closed by the General Assembly of the Supreme Court of Appeal on May 25, 2005. To avoid the closure, Eğitim Sen later revoked the clause in question from its statute.

=== 2008 ===
In 2008 however, a complaint by Adnan Oktar did lead to the banning of the organisation's website. This was a reaction to a press-release about Adnan Oktar’s Atlas of Creation, which was sent to schools free of charge.

=== 2020 ===
On 28 November 2020, Eğitim-Sen voted to expel Nuriye Gülmen, Acun Karadağ and Mehmet Dersulu who are known for the street protests in front of the Human Rights Monument on Yüksel Street in Ankara. While the voting was taking place, all 3 were in jail and were not given the right to defend themselves. This attracted much protests on Twitter as well as in the voting hall where it was decided to expel the three people.

=== Decisions of the European Court of Human Rights ===
In September 2009 the European Court of Human Rights (ECHR) ordered adjudged Turkey to pay 2,340 Euro (around 5,150 Turkish Lira) in compensation for restricting trade union activities of Güldeniz Kaya, Ahmet Seyhan and Saime Özcan, members of the Education and Science Workers Trade Union (Eğitim-Sen). Their complaint not only applied to a disregard of Article 11 of the European Convention on Human Rights which guarantees "freedom of assembly and association". Furthermore, the complaint also applied to Article 13 which defines the "right to an effective remedy".

On 25 September 2012 the ECHR ruled on the demand to close Eğitim-Sen. It was stated that "Eğitim-Sen was founded in Ankara on 13 January 1995. According to information provided by the union it has 167,000 members, is divided into 90 sections and is present in 430 cities. It is attached to KESK (Kamu Emekçileri Sendikaları Konfederasyonu, the Confederation of Unions for public employees), which is a member of EI (Education International)..." As far as the demand for closure was concerned the ECHR argued that "the impugned action brought against the complainant amounted to an interference by national authorities in the exercise of his right to freedom of association." The Court held unanimously that there had been a violation of Article 11 and of Article 10 of the Convention and ordered Turkey to 7,500 EURO for non-pecuniary damage.

== Imprisonment ==
"On 28 October [2012], the Izmir Criminal Court sentenced 25 members of the teachers’ union Egitim Sen, affiliated to the public sector confederation KESK and Education International (EI) to 6 years and 5 months in prison under the country’s anti-terrorism legislation. Prominent figures among those sentenced included KESK President Lami Özgen, the former Women’s Secretary of KESK, Ms. Songul Morsumbul, Egitim Sen Women’s Secretary Ms. Sakine Esen Yilmaz, and former Women’s Secretaries Ms. Gulcin Isbert and Ms. Elif Akgul Ates. The “evidence” against them included possession of books that can be found in any bookstore in Turkey and the holding of union meetings. Owing to the lack of evidence it had appeared that the defendants were going to be acquitted, until two of the judges were summarily removed from the trial just before the final hearing. Even the Chief Justice was in favour of an acquittal. KESK lodged an appeal against the Criminal Court decision."
