= Islamic views on evolution =

Islamic views on evolution are diverse, ranging from theistic evolution to Old Earth creationism. Some Muslims around the world believe "humans and other living things have evolved over time", yet some others believe they have "always existed in present form". Some Muslims believe that the processes of life on Earth started from one single point of species with a mixture of water and a viscous clay-like substance. Muslim thinkers have proposed and accepted elements of the theory of evolution, some holding the belief of the supremacy of God in the process. Some scholars suggested that both narratives of creation and of evolution, as understood by modern science, may be believed by modern Muslims as addressing two different kinds of truth, the revealed and the empirical. Others argue that faith and science can be integrated and complement each other.

== History ==
=== Pre-modern views ===
In Kitab al-Hayawan ('Book of the Animals'), the 9th-century Muslim scholar al-Jāḥiẓ references several facets of natural selection, such as animal embryology, adaptation, and animal psychology. One notable observation al-Jāḥiẓ makes is that stronger rats were able to compete better for resources than small birds, a reference to the modern day theory of the "struggle for existence". Al-Jāḥiẓ also wrote descriptions of food chains.

Animals engage in a struggle for existing, and for resources, to avoid being eaten, and to breed... Environmental factors influence organisms to develop new characteristics to ensure survival, thus transforming them into new species. Animals that survive to breed can pass on their successful characteristics to their offspring.

— Al-Jahiz, Book of the Animals

In 10th century Basra, an Islamic Encyclopedia titled Encyclopedia of the Brethren of Purity, expanded on the Platonic and Aristotelian concept of the great chain of being by proposing a causal relationship advancing up the chain as the mechanism of creation, beginning with the creation of matter and its investment with energy, thereby forming water vapour, which in turn became minerals and "mineral life", and has been proposed to be the earliest attested evolutionary framework by Muhammad Hamidullah.

Ziauddin Sardar writes for New Statesman in 2008,

Creationism is not at all a natural Muslim position. In the early 10th century, Muhammad al-Nakhshabi wrote in The Book of the Yield: “While man has sprung from sentient creatures, these have sprung from plants, and these in turn from combined substances.” In Life of Hai by the 12th-century Andalusian philosopher ibn Tufayl, evolution is strongly emphasised. Hai is “spontaneously generated”, emerges from the slime, evolves through various stages and discovers the power of reason to shape his world and to understand the universe. In contrast, creationism has taken hold over the past decade in Muslim societies – Turkey, for example, came last, just behind the US, in a recent survey of 34 countries on public acceptance of evolution.

According to Sami S. Hawi, the 11th-century Persian scholar Ibn Miskawayh wrote about the evolution of man in his Fawz al-aṣghar.

12th-century Maturidi theologian (mutakallim) Jalāl al-Dīn Muḥammad Rūmī connects the process of evolution and the afterlife. He draws an analogy from the empirically knowable process of evolution as constant emergence of life and annihilation wherof, and the idea of transformation of the individual after death, concluding the existence of the afterlife by asserting live's eternity. As evident from his interpretation of a hadith, according to which Adam evolved over a time-span of 40 days, Rumi implies that human's creation was not at once, but a process.

The 14th-century influential historiographer and historian Ibn Khaldun wrote in the Muqaddimah or Prolegomena ("Introduction") on what he referred to as the "gradual process of creation". Some of Ibn Khaldun's thoughts, according to some commentators, anticipate the biological theory of evolution. Ibn Khaldun asserted that humans developed from "the world of the monkeys", in a process by which "species become more numerous". He believed that humans are the most evolved form of animals, in that they have the ability to reason. He also stated that the Earth began with abiotic components such as "minerals". Slowly, primitive stages of plants such as "herbs and seedless plants" developed and eventually "palms and vines".

Shoaib Ahmed Malik has pointed out that Ibn Khaldun's theory, while remarkable for its acceptance of the kinship between monkeys and humans, should be understood in the context of the late antique and medieval concept of the great chain of being. This theory postulates a linked hierarchy between all entities in creation but is not properly a theory of evolution. The system of the great chain of being implies a graded similarity between the various stages in the hierarchy from minerals to plants, animals, humans, angels, and God, but not a temporal process in which one species originates from the other. While according to some mystical interpretations individual souls may move up the 'ladder' in order to reunite with the divine, the species (or 'substantial forms', in the language of Aristotelian and Neoplatonic ontology) themselves are eternal and fixed. Malik also notes that the Muqadimmah is often quoted without proper regard for context. One widely cited quote is taken from a section called The Real Meaning of Prophecy, which argues that prophets occupy a place in the great chain of being just beneath angels. In Ibn Khaldun's view, this explains why individual prophets may temporarily ascend to the rank of angels and share with them in the knowledge of the divine, which they may then bring back to humanity in the form of revelation. According to Malik, interpretations that see in this an early form of scientific evolution theory ought to explain how angels, prophets and the upwards ascent of the soul fit into that theory.

=== Modern views ===
==== 19th and 20th centuries ====
Evolution was an accepted fact among some Islamic scholarly circles. In his 1874 book titled History of the Conflict between Religion and Science, John William Draper, a scientist and contemporary of Charles Darwin, criticized the Catholic Church for its disapproval of "the Mohammedan theory of the evolution of man from lower forms, or his gradual development to his present condition in the long lapse of time". However, Draper's book has been criticized by more recent scholars as lacking historical accuracy.

In the 19th century, a scholar of Islamic revival, Jamal-al-Din al-Afghānī criticised Darwin's theory of evolution in his Book The truth about the Neicheiri sect and an explanation of the Neicheiris. In this he asks some rhetorical questions on how Darwin would explain certain phenomena with evolutionary theory and claims what answer could he [i.e. Darwin] give except to bite his tongue? and comes to the conclusion: Only the imperfect reesemblance between man and monkey has cast this unfortunate man [i.e. Darwin] into the desert of fantasies, and in order to control his heart, he has clung to a few vain fancies. Later in his life he changed his stance and agreed with Darwin that life will compete with other life in order to succeed, and justified this by attributing the idea of evolution to Muslim thinkers of the middle ages. He also believed that there was competition in the realm of ideas similar to that of nature. However, he believed explicitly that life itself was created by God; Darwin did not discuss the origin of life, saying only "Probably all the organic beings which have ever lived on this earth have descended from some primordial form, into which life was first breathed."

A contemporary of Al-Afghani, Ottoman-Lebanese Sunni scholar Hussein al-Jisr, declared that there is no contradiction between evolution and the Islamic scriptures. He stated that "there is no evidence in the Quran to suggest whether all species, each of which exists by the grace of God, were created all at once or gradually", and referred to the aforementioned story of creation in Sūrat al-Anbiyā.

The late Ottoman intellectual Ismail Fennî, while personally rejecting Darwinism, insisted that it should be taught in schools as even false theories contributed to the improvement of science. He held that interpretations of the Quran might require amendment should Darwinism eventually be shown to be true.

In Kemalist Turkey, important scholars strove to accommodate the theory of evolution in Islamic scripture during the first decades of the Turkish Republic; their approach to the theory defended Islamic belief in the face of scientific theories of their times. The Saudi Arabian government, on the other hand, began funding and promoting denial of evolution in the 1970s in accordance to its Salafi-Wahhabi interpretation of Islam. This stance garnered criticism from the governments and academics of mainline Muslim countries such as Turkey, Pakistan, Lebanon, and Iran, where evolution was initially taught and promoted.

Modernist authors such as al-Afghānī, Muhammad 'Abduh, Hussein al-Jisr and Isma’il Mazhar embraced the notion of evolution, but without accepting its secular dimension. They viewed evolution as a divinely-guided process. The first to formulate the outline of a more positive Islamic theory of evolution was the British-Indian modernist thinker Muhammad Iqbal in his Reconstruction of Religious Thought in Islam, published in 1930. With the politicization of Islam in the 1930s, the debate about Islam and science in general and about evolution in particular died down, and Muslim modernism became focused on the reformulation of Islamic doctrine in light of modern sociopolitical thought, in particular socialism, democracy and the legal status of women and non-Muslims. In the 1960s, however, the Sudanese modernist thinker Mahmud Muhammad Taha formulated what can be considered the first full-blown Islamic theory of evolution. Taha uniquely based his Islamic evolutionism on the intellectual heritage of premodern Sufi thought, as formulated by authors such as al-Ghazāli and especially Ibn al-‘Arabi. His theory basically consists in extending the premodern Sufi concept of individual spiritual progress to the cosmos as a whole, consistent with the Sufi teaching of a correspondence between the human soul and the universe.

==== 21st century ====
In the contemporary era, a significant minority of Muslims who support evolution exist, but evolution is not accepted by mainstream scholars of the post-colonial Muslim world.

Although evolutionary concepts, including natural selection, are presented in the curricula in many Muslim countries, explicit discussion of human evolution is often missing. With the exception of Pakistan, though, religious references are not common in evolutionary science curricula.

Khalid Anees, of the Islamic Society of Britain, discussed the relationship between Islam and evolution in 2004:

Islam also has its own school of Evolutionary creationism/Theistic evolutionism, which holds that mainstream scientific analysis of the origin of the universe is supported by the Quran. Many Muslims believe in evolutionary creationism, especially among Sunni and Shia Muslims and the Liberal movements within Islam. Among scholars of Islam İbrahim Hakkı of Erzurum who lived in Erzurum then Ottoman Empire now Republic of Turkey in the 18th century is famous for stating that 'between plants and animals there is sponge, and, between animals and humans there is monkey'.

Contemporary Islamic scholars Ghulam Ahmed Pervez, Edip Yüksel, and T. O. Shanavas in his book, Islamic Theory of Evolution: the Missing Link between Darwin and the Origin of Species, say that there is no contradiction between the scientific theory of evolution and Quran's numerous references to the emergence of life in the universe.

While Muslim scholars reject Young Earth creationism, and claim the story of creation in the Book of Genesis was corrupted, a movement has begun to emerge recently in some Muslim countries promoting themes that have been characteristic of Christian creationists. This stance has received criticism, due to claims that the Quran and Bible are incompatible.

According to the Guardian newspaper, some British Muslim students have distributed leaflets on campus, advocating against Darwin's theory of evolution. At a conference in the UK in January 2004, entitled Creationism: Science and Faith in Schools, "Dr Khalid Anees, of the Islamic Society of Britain stated that 'Muslims interpret the world through both the Quran and what is tangible and seen. There is no contradiction between what is revealed in the Quran and natural selection and survival of the fittest'."

Adnan Oktar, also known by his pen-name Harun Yahya, is a Muslim advocate against the theory of evolution. He has been referred to as a "charlatan" by a joint declaration of Muslim scholars, and his representative at a conference on Islam and evolution in January 2013 was ridiculed during and after the conference. Most of Yahya's information is taken from the Institute for Creation Research and the Intelligent Design movement in the United States. Oktar largely uses the Internet to promote his ideas.

Maurice Bucaille, famous in the Muslim world for his commentary on the Quran and science, attempted to reconcile evolution with the Quran by accepting animal evolution up to early hominid species, and then positing a separate hominid evolution leading to modern humans. However, these ideas differ from the theory of evolution as accepted by biologists.

Zakir Naik, a contemporary preacher of Islam and advocate of creationism, rejects evolution on the basis that it is only a theory and not a proven fact. Seyyed Hossein Nasr, a prominent Iranian religious scholar, is also a supporter of creationism and refuses evolution for the "chance-like mechanism embedded in the process", the inconsistencies present within, and for the emendations that the theory had undergone since its inception; this view is similarly held by a former pupil of Nasr's, Osman Bakar.

Modern scholar Usaama al-Azami later argued that scriptural narratives of creation, and evolution as understood by modern science, may be believed by modern Muslims as addressing two different kinds of truth, the revealed and the empirical.

Another scholar, Muneer Al-Ali, argues that faith and science can be integrated and complement each other in explaining the complexity and mysteries of existence.

A research paper published in 2016 by the Yaqeen Institute for Islamic Research wrote that there is not a consensus among scholars on how to respond to the theory of evolution, and it is not clear whether the scholars are even qualified scientifically to give a response.

In 2017, Turkey announced plans to end the teaching evolution before the university level, with the government claiming it is too complicated and "controversial" a topic to be understood by young minds.

The popular internet Arab-Canadian Salafi scholar Abu Iyaad has made articles and held recorded public speeches dealing with evolution and Islam. He made articles analyzing Darwinian evolution, saying that it is incompatible with classical Islamic thought. But in his later articles he made a distinction between Microevolution and Macroevolution, and started to argue that Charles Darwin had only found proof of Microevolution and not the latter. And in one article he had a discussion with a real Darwinist, and concluded it was lawful for Muslims to accept Microevolution but not Macroevolution.

After the COVID-19 pandemic of the 2020s, Abu Iyaad started to say that modern virology is inherently linked to Darwinian evolution. And encouraged his listeners to be skeptical of the germ theory.

===== Human and Adamic Exceptionalism =====
Nuh Ha Mem Keller has several issues with evolution which can be broken down to three categorical criticisms. He claims it does a) not fulfill Popper's criterion of falsifiablity and not evidence for macroevolution exists, b) limit God's omnipotence, because of natural selection c) contradicts the Adamic Exceptionalism, according to which even if the rest of creation would have been the result of evolution, man had been created by Allah with such creation being afforded a special consideration and thus separates man from the evolutionary path other living beings go through. Everything else would be kufr. In an article in the Journal on Religion and Science Zygon Shoaib Malik and Elvira Kulieva lay open the possibility of falsifiability, point out his narrow use of naturalism and that he claims consensus on topics that Muslim scholars are still debating.

Contemporary scholar Yasir Qadhi similarly believes that the idea that humans evolved is against the Quran, but says that God may have placed humanity perfectly into an evolutionary pattern to give the appearance of human evolution.

Rana Dajani, a university professor who teaches evolution in Jordan, wrote that almost all of her students tend to be hostile towards the idea of evolution at the beginning of the class, but by the end of the class, the majority accept the idea of evolution, except when it comes to humans.

David Solomon Jalajel, an Islamic author, proclaims an Adamic exceptionalism view of evolution which encourages the theological use of tawaqquf; a tawaqquf is to make no argument for or against a matter to which scripture possesses no declarations for. With tawaqquf, Jalajel believes that Adam's creation does not necessarily signal the beginning of humanity as the Quran makes no declaration as to whether or not human beings were on Earth before Adam had descended. As a result, Jalajel invokes tawaqquf which insinuates that it is possible for humans to exist or not exist before the appearance of Adam on earth with either belief being possible due to the Quran, and that it is possible that an intermingling of Adam's descendants and other humans may or may not have occurred. Thus, the existence of Adam is a miracle since the Quran directly states it to be, but it does not assert that there were no humans who existed at the time of Adam's appearance on earth and who could have came about as a result of evolution. This viewpoint stands in contrast to creationism and human exceptionalism, ultimately declaring that evolution could be viewed without conflict with Islam and that Muslims could either accept or reject "human evolution on its scientific merits without reference to the story of Adam".

== Statistics ==
A 2000 study conducted by a researcher of the University of Oklahoma found that 19% of participants believed that Islam's tenets were not at odds with Darwin's theory of evolution while 81% believed there to be some form of conflict between Islam and Darwinism. One of the participants, an Islamic teacher, stood in opposition to the theory of evolution although was willing to accept certain aspects that were proposed by it. The participants who believed there to be no conflict between Islam and Darwin's theory of evolution were split as it pertained to the possible relationship between primates and humans with only 6% of participants seeing no issue with the assertion.

As per a 2008 report, evolutionary biology was included in the high-school curricula of most Muslim countries. Science foundations of 14 Muslim countries, including Pakistan, Iran, Turkey, Indonesia, and Egypt, recently signed a statement by the Interacademy Panel (IAP, a global network of science academies), in support of the teaching of evolution, including human evolution.

A 2009 survey conducted by the McGill researchers and their international collaborators found that 85% of Indonesian high school students and 86% of Pakistani high school students agreed with the statement, "Millions of fossils show that life has existed for billions of years and changed over time." However, in Indonesia, creationism is common among older residents, even among biology teachers and biology education professors: A study from 2007 in the general population had over 70% of the residents in both these countries believing evolution was false or probably false.

According to a 2013 Pew study, the numbers of Muslims who support evolution appear to be increasing slowly but steadily. For instance, a large majority of people accept human evolution in Kazakhstan (79%) and Lebanon (78%), but relatively few in Afghanistan (26%) and Iraq (27%), with most of the other Islamic countries somewhere in between.

== Ahmadiyya views of evolution ==
The Ahmadiyya community's view of evolution is that of universal acceptance, albeit divinely designed. The movement actively promotes God-directed evolution. Over the course of several decades the movement issued various publications in support of the scientific concepts behind evolution.

== Teaching of evolution ==
According to Rana Dajani, adopting new ways of thinking to pursue knowledge is a core tenet of Islam. Dajani says that interpretation of Quran being a fluid and ongoing process of human exercise can, always, be revisited to clear contradictions, if any arise during pursuits of scientific knowledge. According to Dajani, interaction with modernization and globalization has imported some problematical hostile attitudes towards science like rejection of the theory of evolution into Muslim societies. Dajani says that the negative attitudes among Muslims towards evolution came post-twentieth century associating Darwin with western colonialism, materialism and racism, when actually rudimentary theories of evolution were proposed by Muslim scholars right from the ninth century even up to the 1880s. Dajani says while some Muslim students think accepting the theory of evolution means denying the existence of God, that need not be so, rather after God's initiation, the universe could evolve according to principles of science and logic. Dajani says that usually a detailed explanation of natural evolution of plants, artificial breeding, antibiotic resistance, development of modern medicines and vaccines, helps Muslim students accept evolution. Still, some reservations remain in accepting human evolution; here Dajani says Muslims are warned against arrogance and need to understand that humans are part of the rest of creation. Dajani says, as a scientist, Charles Darwin contributed to human understanding of the emergence and diversification of life on the Earth and that evolution is the right mechanism to explain diversity and the development of species. Dajani says discussion of the controversial topic of evolution helps Muslim students avoid blind acceptance of status quo and question even other aspects of their lives.

== See also ==
- Religious interpretations of the Big Bang theory#Islam – Islamic interpretations of the Big Bang theory
- History of evolutionary thought#Islamic philosophy and the struggle for existence – Early evolutionary thoughts in Islam
- Ziadat, Adel A., Western Science in the Arab World: The Impact of Darwinism (1860-1930). London: Macmillan, 1986
- Elshakry, Marwa, Reading Darwin in Arabic, 1860-1950. Chicago: University of Chicago Press, 2013
- Hoebink, Michel, Sufi Evolutionism: the Modernist Reform Theology of Mahmud Muhammad Taha. Leiden: Brill, 2025

== Sources ==
- Malik, Shoaib Ahmed (2021a). Islam and Evolution: al-Ghazālī and the Modern Evolutionary Paradigm. London: Routledge. doi:10.4324/9780429345753. ISBN 9780429345753.
- Hoebink, Michel, Sufi Evolutionism: the Modernist Reform Theology of Mahmud Muhammad Taha. Leiden: Brill, 2025
