= Adnan Oktar =

Turkish cult leader (born 1956)

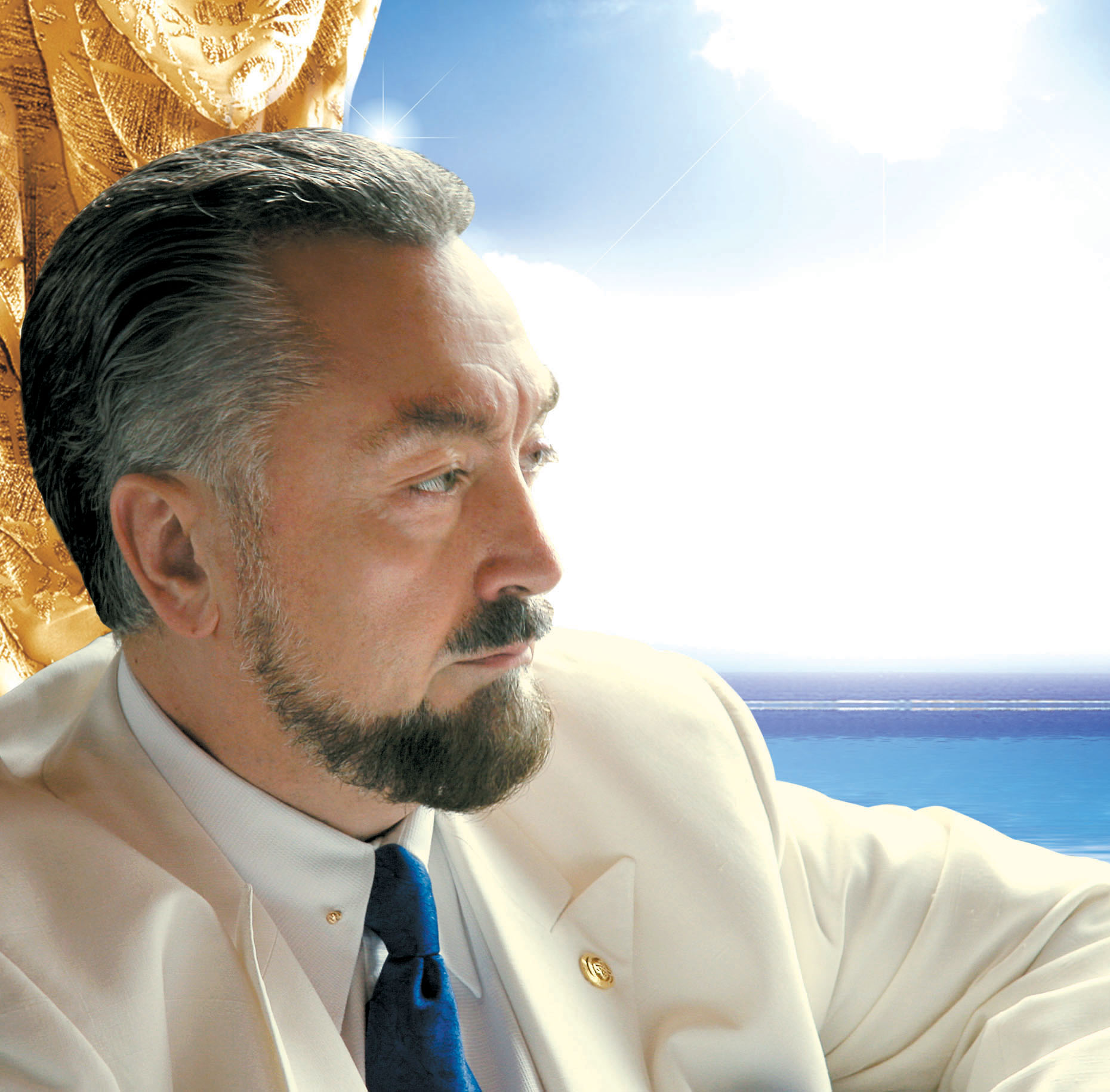
- Oktar in 2009
- Born: 2 February 1956 (age 70); Ankara, Turkey
- Other names: Adnan Hoca, Harun Yahya
- Citizenship: Turkey
- Occupations: Televangelist; cult leader
- Known for: Mahdism, apocalypticism, millenarianism; Books and documentaries under Harun Yahya; Islamic creationism, anti-Darwinism; Inimitability of the Qur'an; Dawah, Islamic televangelism, TV shows; Female followers called 'kittens'; Lawsuits against individuals for defamation; Blocking of Internet sites; Anti-Masonry; Antisemitism, Holocaust denial
- Political party: Justice and Development Party (AK Party)
- Status: Convicted
- Criminal charges: 24 crimes including fraud and sexual abuse
- Penalty: 8,658 years in prison

Details
- Imprisoned at: Van High-Security Closed Penitentiary
- Website: www.harunyahya.com

Adnan Oktar (Turkish pronunciation: [ɑdˈnan ɔkˈtaɾ]; born 2 February 1956), also known as Adnan Hoca or Harun Yahya, is a Turkish televangelist, Islamic creationist, author, and religious leader. His organization is commonly referred to as a cult, and he has been described as a cult leader, and organized crime leader. He was diagnosed with paranoid schizophrenia by multiple mental hospitals in Turkey.

Between the 2000s and late 2010s, he was engaged in "a massive campaign" of proselytizing Westerners to Islam, producing dozens of vividly illustrated books. On 17 November 2022, he was sentenced to 8,658 years in prison for leading a criminal organization, engaging in political and military espionage, sexual abuse of minors, and other charges. Prior to his arrest, Oktar established and ran two organizations: Bilim Araştırma Vakfı (BAV), which promoted creationism, and Millî Değerleri Koruma Vakfı which worked domestically on a variety of moral issues.

In the West, before his arrest and trial, Oktar sent thousands of unsolicited copies of his creationist book, The Atlas of Creation, to French schools and universities in January 2007, and several months later to American scientists, members of Congress, science museums, and schools.

Oktar has advocated a version of Islam that rejects both Sunni and Shia traditions, focusing instead on Quranism. He has preached "the true Islam" based on the Quran on his television channel, A9 TV. Oktar filed more than 5,000 lawsuits against individuals for defamation from 2005 to 2015, which led to the blocking of a number of prominent websites in Turkey.

== Life and career ==
=== Early life and education ===
Adnan Oktar was born in Ankara, Turkey, in 1956, and grew up there through his high school years. While in high school he studied the works of Islamic scholars like Said Nursî, a Kurdish scholar who wrote Risale-i Nur, an extensive tafsir (Qur'anic commentary) that includes a comprehensive political and religious ideology. According to Oktar biographer Anne Ross Solberg, he grew up in a "relatively affluent secular family".

In 1979, Oktar moved to Istanbul and entered Mimar Sinan Fine Arts University to study architecture. It was here, according to Solberg, that he became fully engaged in religious activism. Following the Turkish coup e'tat in September 1980, Oktar began regularly attending the Molla Çelebi Mosque in nearby Fındıklı. Edip Yüksel, who knew Oktar during those years, described him as a "Sunni zealot."

=== Sect beginnings ===
By the early 1980s, Oktar had begun disseminating his views on Islam to young university students from socially-connected, wealthy Istanbul families. Between twenty and thirty of these followers formed a group around Oktar between 1982 and 1984, soon thereafter joined by newly converted private high school students who also came from affluent backgrounds. Yüksel said Oktar presented "a refined and urbanized version" of Nursi's teachings "to the children of the privileged class", avoiding a high pressure or traditional, old fashioned approach. Like Nursi, Oktar argued against Marxism, communism and materialistic philosophy, but attached special importance to refuting evolution and Darwinism, as he believed they were being used to promote materialism and atheism. Oktar personally put money into a pamphlet entitled the Theory of Evolution, which promoted pseudoscientific arguments against evolution.

In 1986 Oktar enrolled in the philosophy department of Istanbul University and began holding lectures, in which many students, mostly from neighboring Boğaziçi University, sought to participate. Oktar's name also began to appear regularly in the press, including a cover story in Nokta magazine. Later that year he published a 550-page book titled Judaism and Freemasonry, based on the antisemitic canard that state offices, universities, political groups and media were influenced by a "hidden group" seeking to undermine "the spiritual, religious, and moral values of the Turkish people and make them like animals."

Oktar was arrested on the grounds of promoting a theocratic revolution and was detained for nineteen months, though he was never formally charged. He spent ten months in a mental hospital, where he was diagnosed with schizophrenia and obsessive-compulsive personality disorder, but he maintains that he was a political prisoner who was punished because of the publication of Judaism and Freemasonry and not mentally ill.

Oktar continued building up his community for the remainder of the 1980s and into the 1990s. His followers were especially active recruiting at summer resorts along the Sea of Marmara. Two themes one ex-follower remembered from this period were a strong hatred of Jews and Freemasons and, in a move away from orthodox Islam, abandoning belief in hadith:

"Suddenly Adnan Hodja repudiated all oral traditions relating to the words and deeds of Muhammad (hadith) and decided that the Koran would be the only point of reference. Henceforth, he reduced the five daily prayers to three, and he dropped the veiling of women. He told us the Mehdi would emerge from Turkey, and he would come with an army of youth. He never said that he was the Mehdi himself, but we all believed that he was."

Oktar claims that, due to the political upheaval in Turkey during this period, he was unable to continue his studies and so devoted his energy to writing books upon leaving school.

In 1990, Oktar founded the Science Research Foundation (Bilim Araştırma Vakfı, or BAV). (Oktar ran and also served as honorary president of both BAV and the later Millî Değerleri Koruma Vakfı) As reported by Solberg, members of the BAV discarded their "overtly Islamic garments" in favor of "designer clothing" and "proclaimed themselves supporters of the ideals" of the founder of modern Turkey, Mustafa Kemal Atatürk, despite the fact that Atatürk was secularist. The BAV held conferences and seminars in which Oktar blamed political and social problems on Darwinism and materialism. Based his own experiences and conversations with ex-members of the BAV, Yüksel characterizes the group as "a complete cult" with "all the criteria of a cult as you would define it today ... isolation, entire control of the lives of the cult members".

=== Later career ===
In 1994, the Islamist Welfare Party (Refah Partisi) won control of the municipalities of Istanbul and Ankara. The new mayors – one of whom was future president Recep Tayyip Erdoğan – made business agreements with Oktar in exchange for political support. The following year, Oktar founded the Foundation for Protection of National Values (Millî Değerleri Koruma Vakfı, or MDKV), through which he networked with other Turkish nationalist organizations and individuals on shared issues. Following the 1997 Turkish military memorandum, the Welfare Party disbanded and the new government, headed by Erdoğan, distanced itself from Oktar going forward.

In 1998 Oktar distributed a new book, The Evolution Deceit. The following year he was arrested and charged with extortion and forming a criminal enterprise. He was convicted and sentenced to three years in prison, but the verdict was appealed and in May 2010 it was overturned. During his imprisonment Oktar engaged in numerous libel suits. In some cases he was successful in blocking high-profile websites such Ekşi Sözlük in Turkey for slander, also that of Richard Dawkins and the entirety of WordPress.com.

Between that time and the present, BAV has organized hundreds of conferences on creationism in Turkey and worldwide. He built a large publishing enterprise with publications sold though Islamic bookstores worldwide. He is one of the most widely distributed authors in the Muslim world.

In 2007 he sent out thousands of unsolicited copies of his Atlas of Creation advocating Islam and creationism to schools and colleges in several European countries and the US.

His television show is viewed by many in the Arab world. According to Middle East Eye, his TV programs were known for featuring him discussing Islamic principles, while (somewhat incongruously), "scantily clad women with bleached blonde hair danced around him to popular music. These women Oktar referred to as his 'kittens'".

In 2010, Oktar was selected as one of the top fifty of The 500 Most Influential Muslims in the World by the Royal Islamic Strategic Studies Centre of Jordan for his dissemination of creationism in an Islamic context, and other extensively distributed publications on Islamic topics.

=== July 2018 arrest and criminal charges ===
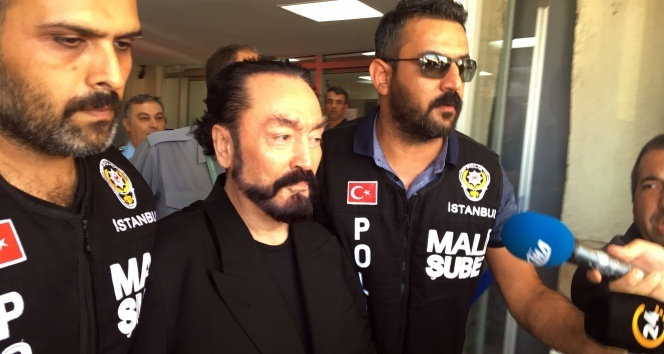
Adnan Oktar's arrest by Turkish Police in 2018

On 11 July 2018, the financial crimes section of the Turkish police detained Oktar and over 160 of his associates on charges including forming a criminal enterprise, financial fraud and sexual abuse. Other charges Oktar faces range from sexual intercourse with minors and kidnapping children to holding people captive, political and military espionage, money laundering and torture. According to the Istanbul chief prosecutor's office, Oktar was apprehended while attempting to run away from the arresting police officers.

On 19 July 2018, Adnan Oktar was remanded into custody pending trial along with 168 of his associates. In addition, after Oktar's initial arrest, over 45 people from over six countries, including two children, have pressed charges against him. Multiple "kittens" alleged in their statements to police that they were beaten, subjected to physical abuse, and forced to have sexual intercourse with Oktar. When asked why he was arrested before being questioned by the police, Oktar stated: "It's a British plot." On 19 July 2019, an Istanbul high court approved the indictment of Oktar for the charges. The first hearing was scheduled for 17 September in Silivri Prison.

On 11 January 2021, Oktar was sentenced to 1,075 years in prison after being tried for charges including forming a criminal enterprise, financial fraud, and sexual abuse. Along with thirteen others detained in the case, sentences totalled 9,803 years. An international trial observation report written by Lionel Blackman heavily criticised the conduct of the trial, and on 15 March 2022, his verdict was overturned by the Turkish Court of Appeal "due to incomplete prosecution and erroneous assessment," with the court asking for "the retrial of all defendants". As of 17 March, taking into account time spent in jail, the appeal court has "decided to release 68 defendants", but not "16 high-profile defendants, including Oktar". Oktar was subsequently sentenced to 8,658 years in prison on 17 November 2022 as a result of his retrial.

== Writings, productions and beliefs ==
Oktar has written numerous books under the pen name Harun Yahya. "Harun" refers to the biblical Aaron and "Yahya" refers to the New Testament John the Baptist.

His publications argue against evolution. They assert that evolution denies the existence of God, abolishes moral values, and promotes materialism and communism.

Truman State University physicist Taner Edis, who was born in Turkey, says the secret to BAV's success is the huge popularity of the Harun Yahya books. "They're fairly lavishly produced, on good-quality paper with full-color illustrations all over the place," he says. "They're trying to compete with any sort of science publication you can find in the Western world. And in a place like Turkey, Yahya books look considerably better-published than most scientific publications." Many of his books have been made into high-resolution videos which are freely downloadable on the Internet.

=== Creationism ===
Oktar has been called "fiercely opposed to the theory of evolution" and Darwinism, which he believes undermines religious belief, thus leading to "the discord, atheism, terrorism and extreme political ideologies" of contemporary life.

The spread of organized Christian creationism to Islam began in the 1980s, when the Muslim minister of education in Turkey turned to the Institute for Creation Research (ICR), a Christian institution then located near San Diego, California, US for help in developing twofold curriculum that would teach evolution and creationism side by side. In 1990, the Science Research Foundation (BAV in Turkish) was formed in Istanbul, headed by Oktar.

For many years Oktar drew on the writings of young earth Christian creationists to develop his case against evolution. Oktar later produced material which was more similar to Intelligent Design. In fact, Harun Yahya's website was listed as an "Islamic intelligent design" website by the Discovery Institute. However Oktar does not embrace use of the term 'Intelligent Design' due to its lack of specific mention of God, calling it 'another of Satan's snares'.

In early 1998, the BAV launched its first campaign against evolution. Thousands of free copies of Oktar's book, The Evolution Deceit, and the booklets based on this book were distributed throughout Turkey. They regularly ran full-page ads against evolution in daily Turkish newspapers and even ran an ad in the U.S. magazine Time. Where the funding for the campaign came from is unknown.

BAV spearheaded an effort to confront Turkish academics who taught evolutionary biology. A number of faculty members were harassed, threatened and slandered in fliers, leading to legal action against BAV (see "Legal Issues" below). In 2005, Professor Ümit Sayın summed up the effect of the BAV's campaign when he said to The Pitch:

In 1998, I was able to motivate six members of the Turkish Academy of Sciences to speak out against the creationist movement. Today, it's impossible to motivate anyone. They're afraid they'll be attacked by the radical Islamists and the BAV.

In September 2008 Oktar issued a challenge offering "10 trillion Turkish lira to anyone who produces a single intermediate-form fossil demonstrating evolution". He has stated: "Not one [fossil] belongs to strange-looking creatures in the course of development of the kind supposed by evolutionists." Biology professor Kevin Padian at the University of California, Berkeley has criticized the notion that such fossils do not exist, stating that Oktar "does not have any sense of what we know about how things change through time. If he sees a fossil crab, he says, 'It looks just like a regular crab, there's no evolution.'"

Taner Edis has said "there is nothing new in the Yahya material: scientifically negligible arguments and outright distortions often copied from Christian anti-evolution literature, presented with a conservative Muslim emphasis" concluding it "has no scholarly standing whatsoever". According to Richard Dawkins, Oktar "doesn't know anything about zoology, doesn't know anything about biology. He knows nothing about what he is attempting to refute".

==== The Atlas of Creation ====
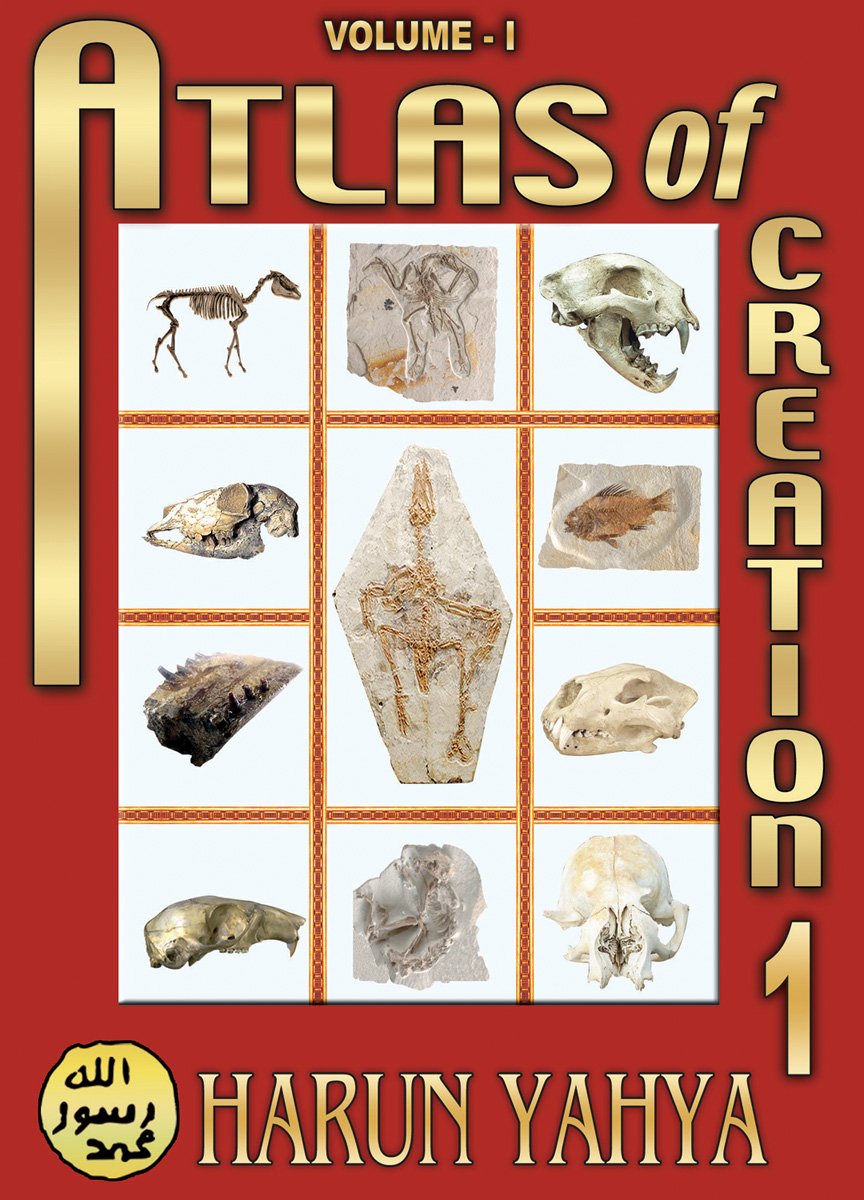
Cover of the English edition of volume 1 of The Atlas of Creation (Global Publishing, Istanbul, 2006)

Oktar published volume 1 of his Yaratılış Atlası (The Atlas of Creation), with Global Publishing, Istanbul, Turkey in October 2006. Volumes 2 and 3 followed in 2007. A dedicated website (Note: yaratilisatlasi.com, English: atlasofcreation.com) registered to Global Yayıncılık (Global Publishing), Istanbul, went online the same year.

At 28 cm x 43 cm and nearly 5.5 kg, with a bright red cover and almost 800 glossy pages, most of them lavishly illustrated, Atlas of Creation is, according to The New York Times, "the largest and most beautiful creationist challenge yet to Darwin's theory, which Yahya calls a feeble and perverted ideology contradicted by the Koran". Tens of thousands of copies of the book were sent unsolicited to schools, prominent researchers and research institutes throughout Europe and the United States.

In France, scientists spoke out against the book, and in America scientists are unimpressed.

Padian said that people who had received copies were "just astounded at its size and production values and equally astonished at what a load of crap it is," adding that "[Oktar] does not really have any sense of what we know about how things change through time."

Geneticist and writer Adam Rutherford writes that the book claims to prove that no species alive on Earth today underwent mutagenesis, but points out that

Page 244 has a picture of a caddis fly, with a legend that asserts - as virtually every page does - that the beast in question has always existed in its current form as demonstrated by a vaguely similar looking fossil, therefore evolution is bunk. Except it's not a caddis fly, it's a fishing lure, beautifully crafted by master tier Graham Owen, with the clearly visible hook piercing the man-made abdomen. Other exquisite examples of Owen's work also appear in the Atlas.

Gerdien de Jong, one of five biologists at Utrecht University who received a copy of the book, has described its reasoning as "absurdly ridiculous".

Biologist PZ Myers wrote: "The general pattern of the book is repetitious and predictable: the book shows a picture of a fossil and a photo of a living animal, and declares that they haven't changed a bit, therefore evolution is false. Over and over. It gets old fast, and it's usually wrong (they have changed!) and the photography, while lovely, is entirely stolen."

The Committee on Culture, Science and Education of the Parliamentary Assembly of the Council of Europe wrote in a report that "None of the arguments in this work are based on any scientific evidence, and the book appears more like a primitive theological treatise than the scientific refutation of the theory of evolution."

=== Conspiracy theories ===
Oktar propagates a number of conspiracy theories, beginning with the antisemitic canard in his 1986 Judaism and Freemasonry (Yahudilik ve Masonluk). The book suggests that the principal mission of Jews and Freemasons in Turkey was to erode the spiritual, religious, and moral values of the Turkish people and, thus, make them like animals, as stated in what Oktar refers to as their use of "Distorted Torah." Oktar asserts that "the materialist standpoint, evolution theory, anti-religious and immoral lifestyles were indoctrinated to the society as a whole" by Jews and Freemasons.

His theory of a global conspiracy of Freemasonry is expounded in his book Global Masonluk (Global Freemasonry) and on his websites Masonluk and Global Freemasonry. According to Oktar, Freemasonry is "the main architect of the world system based on materialist philosophy, but which keeps that true identity concealed." Oktar called the theory of evolution a Masonic conspiracy initiated by the Rosicrucians.

Oktar's recent publications no longer attack Jews and Judaism, but declare Darwinism and materialism to be conspiracies responsible for antisemitism and terrorism. In recent publications and interviews (since 2004). Oktar qualifies his condemnations of Zionism and Freemasonry by adding the word atheist before them, as in atheist Zionists and atheist Freemasons.

He believes that a secret cabal, known as the "British deep state", is trying to control the world.

=== Holocaust denial and affirmation ===
Oktar's position on the Holocaust has evolved from "antisemitic conspiracy-theorising" (1980s), denying that the Nazis had a plan for the mass extermination of Jews (The Holocaust Deception, 1996), to acknowledging the genocide (The Holocaust Violence, 2006), and most recently to attending "numerous events in Israel", being photographed with "far-right Zionists like Yehuda Glick and Rabbi Meir Lau".

In 1996, BAV distributed its first book, originally published the previous year, entitled Soykırım Yalanı ("The Holocaust Deception" or "The Holocaust Lie"). The publication of Soykırım Yalanı sparked controversy. This book claims that "what is presented as Holocaust is the death of some Jews due to the typhus plague during the war and the famine towards the end of the war caused by the defeat of the Germans."

A Turkish painter and intellectual, Bedri Baykam, published a strongly worded critique of the book in Ankara's daily newspaper, Siyah-Beyaz ("Black and White"). A legal suit for slander was brought against him. During the trial in September, Baykam exposed the real author of The Holocaust Lie as Adnan Oktar. The suit was withdrawn in March 1997.

In 2001, the Stephen Roth Institute, of Tel Aviv University, listed Oktar as a Holocaust denier due to the publication of The Holocaust Lie. Three years later, the Stephen Roth Institute expressed the opinion that Oktar had increased his tolerance toward others, asserting that "he now works towards promoting inter-religious dialogue", calling upon all Muslims to have "a tolerant and friendly attitude toward other religions".

In 2006, BAV published a book affirming the Holocaust, called The Holocaust Violence. The Holocaust Violence states,

The Nazis subjected European Jews to indisputable and unforgivable cruelty during World War II. They humiliated, insulted and degraded millions of Jewish civilians, forcing them from their homes and enslaving them in concentration camps under inhuman conditions ... Certainly the Jewish people, of whom 5.5 million died in concentration camps, were the worst victims of the Nazi barbarity.

In a 2007 interview with The Guardian, Oktar denied writing The Holocaust Lie, a claim that The Guardian stated was "hard to believe." The next year in an interview with Der Spiegel, Oktar claimed The Holocaust Lie had been written by a friend who had published his own essays using Oktar's pen name, "Harun Yahya", on his own. Oktar disclaimed the first book, and said the second book reflected his own opinions.

In 2009, Oktar expressed his new views on Jews in his own words, "hatred or anger toward the line of the Prophet Abraham is completely unacceptable. The Prophet Abraham is our ancestor, and the Jews are our brothers. We want the descendants of the Prophet Abraham to live in the easiest, pleasantest and most peaceful manner. We want them to be free to perform their religious obligations, to live as they wish in the lands of their forebears and to frequently remember Allah in comfort and security."

Nevertheless, that year the Anti-Defamation League (ADL) described Yahya as "an anti-Semitic Turkish writer whose articles demonize Jews who support Israel as "godless" and blames them for committing atrocities." The ADL also argued that Yahya quotes Holocaust-denier Roger Garaudy and still cites The Holocaust Deception in the articles on his site.

After his 2018 arrest Oktar was described by The Times of Israel as having "been criticized in the past for publishing books featuring anti-Semitic conspiracy theories and Holocaust denial, but in recent years has renounced them and held events to combat those phenomena in the Muslim world. He has been embraced by some high-profile Israelis."

=== Television broadcasting ===
On 21 March 2011, Oktar started television broadcasting on the A9 satellite channel, which broadcasts over both the internet and Turkish cable networks. The channel is his "main platform" for broadcasting his "unique brand of televangelism", interviews, night lectures, as well as documentaries based on his works.

His TV programs have received considerable attention from both Turkish and international media for their 'weirdness', and in particular for featuring female devotees, he calls his 'kittens'. In stark contrast to orthodox Islamic decorum and the shows of any other Muslim televangelist, the women, who are usually wealthy socialites who have undergone plastic surgery, wear heavy make-up and tight Versace T-shirts (or other tight, revealing outfits), and dance to pop music between sets. They and Adnan Oktar have discussions about Islam, fossils that supposedly discredit evolution, and about Oktar himself.

Oktar has defended the unusual appearance of his co-hosts in Islamic terms ("A woman may wear the head-covering, or cover herself up entirely or uncover her head or wear low-cut clothes. Once she says, 'I am a Muslim,' nobody has the right to judge her.") But others have questioned whether Oktar and his kitten cohosts are motivated by the empowerment of women and basing Islam only on the Quran (setting aside Sunni and Shia doctrines and traditions).

According to Edip Yüksel, Oktar got the idea that hijab is not necessary for women from him in the 1980s. "At that time I said that the headscarf doesn't exist in the Quran", and thought of Oktar as a kindred spirit. But now he feels his argument has been "abused" on behalf of a "sex cult", which has "created very bad associations for the cause of reformation" of Islam. Journalist Meher Ahmad attempted to interview the women in Oktar's group about feminism in Islam, travelling to Istanbul in 2015 to make a video for Vice. But when she arrived she found herself repeatedly stonewalled and treated with suspicion", by Oktar's people unable to get "a one-on-one interview or a group interview with the women."

=== Other religious beliefs ===
Oktar has been described as preaching Islam as a "dutiful disciple" of Kurdish Islamic scholar Said Nursî, criticizing not only communism, but Atatürk's secular reforms, and especially his mortal enemy Freemasonry, but making "no claim whatever to clerical authority".

United Islamic state

Oktar has preached for Turkish-Islamic union, "a new Ottoman Empire girdling the world from Eastern Russia to Western Nigeria, which would unify the Islamic world under Turkish leadership".

Sex outside of marriage

According to Halil Arda, Oktar justified concubinage "by reference to the Ottoman harems, while passages of the Koran were recited to justify the practice of severing the ties of the young followers to their families". He quotes a Turkish legal scholar "involved in some of the court cases against Oktar":

In [Oktar's] reading, the love for mother and father is an offence to God. Parents are seen as the executors of God's will to raise the child. Once the child reaches adulthood, their role is fulfilled. If the parents happen to join, they are considered pious and may become fellow comrades. If they remain 'infidels', they are considered enemies.

Despite cutting off these relations, the group ultimately depended on their parents' financial and social resources, as "followers were encouraged to plunder their parents' bank accounts and sell their assets".

Love of luxury

"I want to resemble Prophet Solomon. Prophet Solomon was like this. He used to be well dressed. He liked being well dressed. His palace was beautiful; there were beautiful people around him. Allah is beautiful. Allah loves those who are beautiful, wants everywhere to be beautiful. Paradise is also beautiful. [The] aim of a Muslim should be beauty."

Eschatology

Oktar preaches that "the day of judgement, contrary to what may believe, is approaching now, not in some distant future". There will be two apocalyptic phases: one of "material and spiritual problems", followed by a 'Golden Age', where "true religion" brings "generosity and kindness". This will be followed by "rapid social collapse" before Judgment Day arrives. One unique variation by Oktar on the traditional prophesy of Gog and Magog is that their invasion will not be of hordes of warriors but of television programs they transmit, and that the blocking of them by the Two-Horned One (Dhu al-Qarnayn) will not be by some wall but by electromagnetic jamming. Oktar has also emphasized the importance in Islam of "the role to be played by Jesus at the end of the world", which permits him "to cultivate an ecumenical image"—Muslims and Christians will be joined in combat 'destroying the society established by the Antichrist, they will save mankind from atheism'".

No true beliefs

According to one critic (Halil Arda in New Humanist), Oktar's "ideological and political promiscuity" (jumping from Anti-Darwinism, interfaith dialogue, Turkish-Islamic union) may be because he doesn't really have any "genuine beliefs", and merely work by opportunistically jumping "on issues" that followers have come up with and that he thinks "will further his notoriety". Arda quotes a former follower: "We had something to please everybody: Atatürk, namaz (ritual prayer), creationism and, if need be, cocaine."

=== Bibliography ===
Oktar's books and brochures appear in Turkish published by "Vural Yayıncılık" ("Global Publishing") of Istanbul. English translations of his books are published by Ta-Ha Publishers in London, Global Publishing of Istanbul, Al-Attique Publishers in Toronto, and Goodword Books of New Delhi, India. As of mid-2008, Oktar's "publishing empire" had produced "260 books in 52 languages, over 80 DVDs and dozens of websites".

Publication media includes books, booklets, pamphlets, children's books, journals, documentaries, audiobooks, CDs, posters and over a hundred websites. The total number of books and brochures published by Oktar number in the hundreds. (Note: As of December 2010, Oktar's official website lists 274 items in Turkish (dated October 1991 to January 2010), 197 items in English, or 771 items counting all languages.) The works are produced on high-quality paper with colored illustrations and sold in Islamic bookstores worldwide.

== Other legal issues ==
In addition to the slander trial over The Holocaust Lie, Oktar has been involved in other cases. Although most are unrelated to creationism or religion, a BAV spokesperson says Oktar is being persecuted "because of his ideas." Physicist Taner Edis of Truman State University, who has followed the case closely, says given the political pressures on Turkey's justice system, that's "not entirely implausible."

In the summer of 1986, Oktar was arrested for his statement "I am from the nation of Abraham and Turkish ethnicity" in a newspaper interview. Oktar was arrested for promoting a theocratic revolution for which he served 19 months, though he was never formally charged.

In 1991, Oktar was arrested for possession of cocaine, which he claimed had been planted in one of the books in his library by the security forces, who, he said, also spiked his food with cocaine. He was later acquitted.

A number of faculty members who taught evolution were harassed, threatened and slandered in flyers that labeled them "Maoists". In 1999, six of the professors won a civil court case against the BAV for defamation and were each awarded $4,000.

In 1999, Oktar was arrested and charged with using threats for personal benefit and creating an organization with the intent to commit a crime. BAV's lawyers claimed there were several human rights violations during this police operation, as well as the use of violence during the arrest and afterwards. The judicial process lasted over two years, during which most of the complainants retracted their claims. As a result, cases against Oktar and other BAV members were dismissed.

The 1999 case was reopened by another court in 2008. The indictment from the prosecutor's office, made public by Cumhuriyet, claimed blackmail and extortion. Among other things, it claimed that BAV used its female members to attract young scholars from rich families with the promise of sexual favors in exchange for attending events. It was claimed that the sexual activities of thousands of people were videotaped with hidden cameras for the purpose of blackmail. Members who wanted to leave the group were threatened that the tapes would be made public. In the face of all these allegations against BAV, the Chairman of the Court announced in the hearing on 29 February 2008, that testimonies obtained through unlawful means may not be considered as evidence based on article 148 of the criminal code.

Oktar was convicted of creating an illegal organization for personal gain. He and 17 other members of his organisation were sentenced to three years in prison. Oktar appealed the verdict. In May 2010, the Court of Appeals overturned the conviction and dismissed the charges.

== Blocking of Internet sites ==
Since 2007, Oktar has successfully had the Turkish government block public access to several websites. In April 2007, Oktar filed a libel lawsuit against the owners of Ekşi Sözlük, a virtual community similar to everything2. The court reviewed the complaint and ordered the service provider to close the site to public access. The site was temporarily suspended so the entry on Oktar could be expunged and locked. Then access to Süper Poligon, a news website, was also restricted following Oktar's complaint. In August 2007, Oktar got a Turkish court to block WordPress.com throughout Turkey. His lawyers argued that blogs on WordPress.com contained libelous material, which WordPress.com was unwilling to remove.

Edip Yüksel, a Turkish writer who knew Oktar in the 1980s, had his own website banned in Turkey due to Oktar's complaints. In addition, Yüksel wrote a Turkish-language book, The Cult of the Antichrist, but has yet to find "a publisher willing to brave Mr. Oktar's lawyers."

On 19 September 2008, a Turkish court banned Internet users in Turkey from viewing the official Richard Dawkins website after Oktar claimed its contents were defamatory, blasphemous and insulting to religion, arguing that his personality was violated by this site. The ban was lifted on 8 July 2011.

In September 2008, a complaint by Oktar led to the banning of the internet site of the Union of Education and Scientific Workers. This was followed by a block of the country's third-biggest newspaper site, Vatan, in October.

== See also ==
- List of Mahdi claimants
- List of longest prison sentences

== Books ==
- Filiu, Jean-Pierre (2011). Apocalypse in Islam. Translated by DeBevoise, M. B. Berkeley: University of California Press. ISBN 978-0-520-26431-1.
