= The Atlas of Creation =

Series of creationist books by Harun Yahya

The Atlas of Creation Volume 1
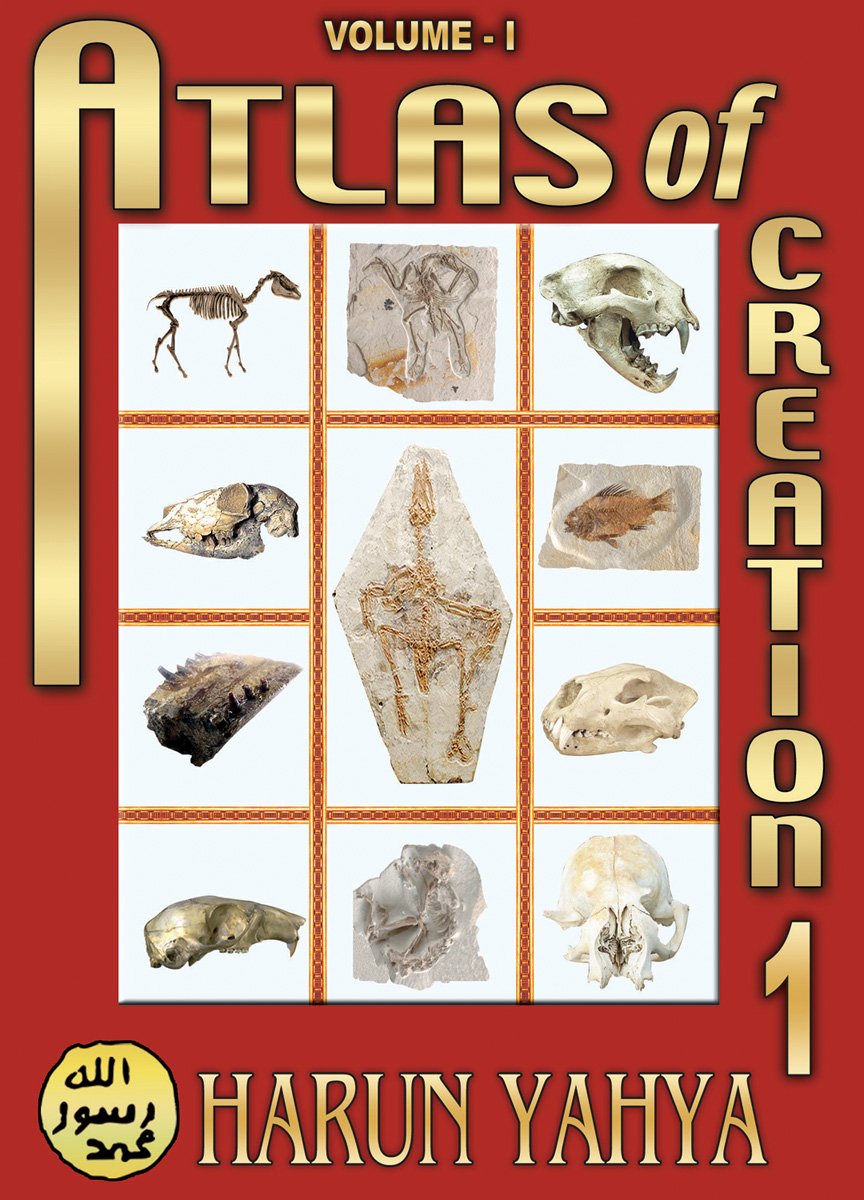
- Author: Harun Yahya
- Language: Turkish
- Subject: Creationism
- Publisher: Global Yayıncılık
- Publication date: 2006
- Publication place: Turkey
- Media type: Print
- Pages: 870
- Followed by: The Atlas of Creation Volume 2

The Atlas of Creation (or, in Turkish, Yaratılış Atlası) is a series of creationist books written by Adnan Oktar under the pen name Harun Yahya. Oktar published volume 1 of The Atlas of Creation with Global Publishing, Istanbul, Turkey in October 2006, volumes 2 and 3 followed in 2007, and volume 4 in 2012. The first volume is over 800 pages long. The Turkish original was translated into English, German, Chinese, French, Dutch, Italian, Urdu, Hindi and Russian.

Thousands of copies of the first volume were mailed unsolicited to schools, prominent researchers and research institutes in the United States and Europe in 2007. The series has attracted widespread criticism for its inaccuracy, unauthorized use of copyrighted photographs, and intellectual dishonesty.

== Contents ==
The books argues that different species of living things are exactly the same today as they were hundreds of millions of years ago, that having been created by God, life forms on Earth have never undergone even the slightest change/evolution. (Unlike some fundamentalist Christians, Oktar does not argue for a "Young Earth creationism"—that the universe is a few thousand years old—but talks of species being "100 million years old"). The book shows pictures of million-year-old fossils and pictures of modern-day animals that are claimed to be their modern equivalent.

== Distribution ==
In 2007 tens of thousands of copies of the book were given to schools, prominent researchers and research institutes throughout the United States and Europe, including to a large number of French, Belgian, Spanish and Swiss schools. Some of the schools that received copies were in France as well as prominent researchers at Utrecht University, University of Tilburg, University of California, Brown University, University of Colorado, University of Chicago, Brigham Young University, Stony Brook University, the University of Connecticut, the University of Georgia, Imperial College London, Abertay University, the University of Idaho, the University of Vermont, and several others. When the book was sent to French schools and universities, controversy resulted and the book sparked further concern about Islamic radicalism in France.

== Reception ==
The arguments used by the book to undermine evolution have been criticized as illogical, while evolutionary biologist Kevin Padian has stated that people who had received copies were "just astounded at its size and production values and equally astonished at what a load of crap it is." adding that "[Oktar] does not really have any sense of what we know about how things change through time." Biologist PZ Myers wrote: "The general pattern of the book is repetitious and predictable: the book shows a picture of a fossil and a photo of a living animal, and declares that they haven't changed a bit, therefore evolution is false. Over and over. It gets old fast, and it's usually wrong (they have changed!) and the photography, while lovely, is entirely stolen."

Richard Dawkins reviewed the book, noting that it contains a number of factual errors, such as the misidentification of a sea snake as an eel (one is a reptile, the other a fish) and in two places uses images of fishing lures copied from the internet instead of actual species. A number of other modern species are mislabelled. He concludes: "I am at a loss to reconcile the expensive and glossy production values of this book with the breathtaking inanity of the content. Is it really inanity, or is it just plain laziness — or perhaps cynical awareness of the ignorance and stupidity of the target audience — mostly Muslim creationists. And where does the money come from?"

Geneticist and writer Adam Rutherford writes that the book claims to prove that no species alive on Earth today underwent mutagenesis, but points out that

Page 244 has a picture of a caddis fly, with a legend that asserts - as virtually every page does - that the beast in question has always existed in its current form as demonstrated by a vaguely similar looking fossil, therefore evolution is bunk. Except it's not a caddis fly, it's a fishing lure, beautifully crafted by master tier Graham Owen, with the clearly visible hook piercing the man-made abdomen. Other exquisite examples of Owen's work also appear in the Atlas.

=== Council of Europe ===
The Committee on Science and Education of the Parliamentary Assembly of the Council of Europe in its report, called The dangers of creationism in education, argued:

In his numerous anti-Darwinist works, [Yahya] tries to prove the absurdity and unscientific nature of the theory of evolution, which is for him only one of Satan's greatest deceptions. However, the pseudo-scientific method he uses in his work The Atlas of Creation cannot in any way be considered scientific. The author tries to prove the non-scientific nature of the theory of evolution by taking and challenging the evidence of evolution. He does not mention any prior questioning. Moreover, as he only compares photographs of fossils to photographs of current species he provides no scientific proof for these statements. Even better, ..., on page 60 of this work we see a superb photograph of a fossil of a perch with a claim in the caption that this fish has not evolved over millions of years. That, however, is wrong: a detailed study of the fossil and perches living today shows that, on the contrary, they have evolved a great deal. Unfortunately, Yahya's book is full of this type of falsehood. None of the arguments in this work are based on any scientific evidence, and the book appears more like a primitive theological treatise than the scientific refutation of the theory of evolution. It may be noted that Yahya says he has the support of major scientists. They would also have to be specialists in the biology of evolution! ... By only presenting facts without any theory or proof, Harun Yahya abuses the credulity of individuals who listen to him or read his works. Moreover, as Jacques Arnoult emphasises, the BAV and Harun Yahya in Turkey, just like the American Institute for Creation Research, resort to partial, indeed erroneous, references to develop their creationist arguments. The authors do not hesitate to quote magazine articles that defend evolution but they succeed in turning the meaning round by shortening the quotations. This is nothing less than intellectual dishonesty, which is particularly harmful.

== Finance ==
At least a couple of sources (Richard Dawkins, Kenneth R. Miller), have wondered where the money came from to pay for mailing tens of thousands of copies of a 800-page book with very high production values around the world to people and places unlikely to be very sympathetic to its message. (Adnan Oktar has also let readers download much of his work from his dozens of websites for free.) According to biologist Kenneth R. Miller, “if you went into a bookstore and saw a book like this, it would be at least $100. ... The production costs alone are astronomical. We are talking millions of dollars.” According to Reuters news agency, recipients of the Atlases have wondered whether "U.S. creationists or Saudi financiers" are helping fund Oktar. Oktar himself maintains the giveaways were "normal public relations", funded by profits from sales of his books. However, Taner Edis, a Turkish-American physicist finds all these explanations implausible – “American creationists I talk to basically envy Harun Yahya’s financial resources"; Wahhabi Saudi donors would disapprove of the undoctrinaire mixture of Shi’ite, Sufi and Sunni elements in Oktar’s message; profits from sales of the book would not seem to provide nearly enough given the cost of the giveaways and that sales of the book have been less than brisk. Tom Heneghan of Reuters quotes an "Istanbul Islam expert" speculating that the most likely explanation is donations from "a small group of affluent young Turks" who make up Oktar's "core group" of supporters.
