= Human Rights Monument =

Public sculpture in Turkey

- İnsan Hakları Anıtı (Turkish)
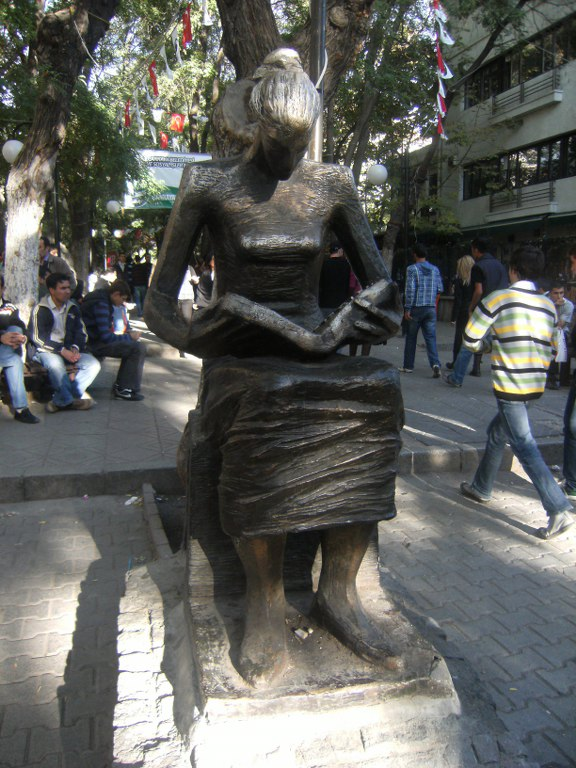
- The Human Rights Monument in the pedestrian zone of Ankara's Yüksel Street
- Artist: Metin Yurdanur
- Year: 1990
- Medium: Bronze
- Location: Yüksel Street, Kızılay, Ankara

The Human Rights Monument or Human Rights Sculpture is a monument in Turkey's capital, Ankara.

The monument was made by sculptor Metin Yurdanur in 1990 out of bronze. The monument which depicts a woman reading the Universal Declaration of Human Rights, has been the assembly point of many protests. The monument can be found at the intersection of Konur street and Yüksel street and its latest restoration was in 2010.
