= National Council of Government and Public Workers' Unions =

Japanese national trade union federation

The National Council of Government and Public Workers' Unions (Japanese: 全国官庁労働組合協議会, Zenkankō) was a national trade union federation representing public sector workers in Japan.

The federation was founded on 26 November 1946, and in its early years frequently organised strikes in order to improve public sector wages. While many of its affiliates were also members of Sanbetsu, others were independent.

By 1958, the federation claimed 2,404,179 members. The federation aligned itself with the Democratic Socialist Party and the right wing of the labour movement. On 13 November 1964, it merged with the All-Japan Trade Union Congress and the Japanese Federation of Labour, to form the Japanese Confederation of Labour (Domei).

The federation remained in existence, and many of its affiliates chose to affiliate with Sohyo rather than with Domei. In 2003, it merged with the Council of Public Corporation and Government Enterprise Workers' Unions, the Congress for Joint Struggles of Public Workers' Unions of Japan, to form the Alliance of Public Services Workers' Unions.

== Affiliates ==
The following unions were affiliated in 1958:

Abbreviation	Union
Agricultural and Forestry Ministry Workers' Unions	Zennorin
Alcohol Monopoly Workers' Union	Arukoru Senbai
All Garrison Forces Workers' Union	Zenchuro
All Japan Local and Municipal Government Workers' Union	Jichiro
All Japan National Hospital Workers' Union	Zeniro
All Labour Ministry Employees' Union Federation	Zenrodo
All Minting Bureau Workers' Union	Zenzohei
All Monopoly Corporation Workers' Union	Zensenbai
All National Tax Collectors' Union	Zenkokuzei
All Postal Workers' Union	Zentei
All Radio Wave Control Agency Workers' Union	Zendempa
All Transportation Ministry Workers' Union	Zenunyu
Construction Ministry Workers' Union	Zenkenro
Customs Houses Workers' National Union	Zenkanzei
Education Ministry Employees' Union	Monbushokuso
Federation of All Japan Water Works Employees' Unions	Zensuiren
Federation of Tokyo Metropolitan Government Workers' Unions	Tororen
Finance Ministry Employees' Union	Okurashokuso
Government Printing Bureau Workers' Union	Zeninsatsu
International Trade and Industry Ministry Workers' Union	Zenshoko
Japan Federation of Municipal Transport Workers' Unions	Toshikotsu
Japan High School Teachers' Union	Nikkokyo
Japan National Railway Locomotive Engineers' Union	Kiro
Japan Teachers' Union	Nikkyoso
National Judicial Department Employees' Union Federation	Zenshiho
National Procurement Agency Workers' Union	Zenchotatsu
National Railway Workers' Union	Kokuro
National Telecommunication Workers' Union	Zendentsu
Union of Employees of the Diet Library	Kokkaitoshokan
Union of Employees of the Employment Planning Board	Keizaikikakucho
Union of Employees of the Hokkaido Development Board	Hokkaido
Union of Employees of the Inspection Department of the Administrative Management Agency	Gyokankansatsu
Union of Employees of the Ministry of Justice	Zenhome
Union of Employees of the National Personnel Authority	Jinjiin
Union of Employees of the Pension Bureau of the Prime Minister's Office	Onkyukyoku
Union of Employees of the Secretariat of the Japan Service Council	Gakujitsukaigi
Union of Employees of the Statistical Bureau of the Prime Minister's Office	Soritokei
Union of Employees of the Statistics Standard Department of the Administrative Management Agency	Kaikenro
Welfare Ministry Employees' Union	Koseishokuso
