= Japanese Federation of Chemical Workers' Unions =

Trade union in Japan

The Japanese Federation of Chemical Workers' Unions (Japanese: 全国化学労働組合総連合, Kagaku Soren) is a trade union representing workers in the chemical industry in Japan.

The union was founded in 1978, with the merger of the Japanese Federation of Chemical Industry Workers' Unions with part of the Japanese Federation of Synthetic Chemistry Workers' Unions. Like its predecessors, it was affiliated with the General Council of Trade Unions of Japan until the late 1980s, and then with its successor, the Japanese Trade Union Confederation (RENGO). By 1996, it had 67,629 members.

In 2002, the union became affiliated with the Japan Federation of Energy and Chemistry Workers' Unions (JEC), while maintaining its separate organization. It moved to the right wing of the trade union movement, co-operating closely with management and, in 2016 it withdrew from both the JEC and from RENGO, objecting to their support for the Democratic Party of Japan. By 2021, it had only 4,791 members in five affiliated company unions.
