= Japan National Hospital Workers' Union =

Trade union in Japan

The Japan National Hospital Workers' Union (JNHWU; Japanese: 全日本国立医療労働組合, Zeniro) is a trade union representing workers in hospitals, sanatoria, and medical research, in Japan.

The union was founded on 28 October 1948. It became affiliated with the National Council of Government and Public Workers' Unions, and later with the General Council of Trade Unions of Japan. From 1957, it was part of the Japan Council of Medical Workers' Unions (Irokyo), although it maintained its separate identity, and by 1958, it had 24,159 members. Through Irokyo, it became aligned with the National Confederation of Trade Unions (Zenroren) in 1989, and it later joined the Japan Federation of National Public Service Employees' Unions, another Zenroren affiliate. As of May 2021, the union had 19,451 members.
