= Nippon Express Workers' Union =

Trade union in Japan

The Nippon Express Workers' Union (NEU, Japanese: 全日通労働組合, Zennittsu) is a trade union representing workers at Nippon Express in Japan.

The union was founded in 1946, and initially had 120,000 members. It affiliated to Sanbetsu, then to the General Council of Trade Unions of Japan, and by 1967 its membership had fallen to 71,596. The following year, it became part of the All Japan Federation of Transport Workers' Unions, to which it remains affiliated.
