= Japan Federation of Commercial Workers' Unions =

Trade union in Japan

The Japan Federation of Commercial Workers' Unions (JUC, Shogyororen) was a trade union representing service sector workers in Japan.

The union was founded in 1970 and affiliated to both the Japanese Confederation of Labour and to the International Federation of Commercial, Clerical, Professional and Technical Employees. It transferred to the Japanese Trade Union Confederation at the end of the 1980s, and by 1996 had 129,043 members. In 2001, it merged with the Chain Store Labor Unions Council and the Seven Department Store Unions' Council, to form the Japan Federation of Service and Distributive Workers' Unions.
