= Sueaki Takaoka =

Japanese businessman and nobleman

Sueaki Takaoka (高丘 季昭, Takaoka Sueaki, January 14, 1929 – March 13, 1996) was a Japanese businessman and nobleman. He was chairman at FamilyMart, Seiyu Group and Seibu Saison Group, and Vice Chairman at Japan Business Federation.

== Life ==
Takaoka was born on January 14, 1929, in Tokyo, the son of Viscount Takaoka Kazusue. His wife Sayoko was the daughter of the entomologist Viscount Takagi Masanari. His maternal grandfather was Baron Senshū Suetaka. In 1930, his father died, and he succeeded his father as Viscount. He held his noble title until the abolition of the kazoku peerage in 1947. He studied politics at the University of Tokyo, graduating in 1951.

After graduating from university, he began work as an economic journalist at Tokyo Shimbun. He subsequently served as Chairman of the Japan Federation of Press Workers' Unions. After working as a news commentator at Nippon Broadcasting System, he was invited to join the Seibu Department Stores by one of his friends from university, Seiji Tsutsumi, in 1963. At Seibu, he worked in distribution industry research at Seibu Butsuryū Group (Saison Group).

After working at Seibu, Takaoka moved to Seiyu Group in 1971, becoming executive director in 1973, and Senior Executive Director in 1984. In 1986, he became chairman at FamilyMart. Whilst chairing FamilyMart, he simultaneously became Vice Chairman and Representative Director at Seiyu Group in 1987, after which he went on to become chairman at Seiyu Group in March 1988.

In 1991, he became chairman at Seibu Saison Group. The Japanese government awarded Takaoka the Medal with Blue Ribbon for his achievements in 1993. He then went on to become Vice Chairman at Japan Business Federation in 1995, shortly before his death.

Takaoka died on March 13, 1996, aged 67.

== Awards ==
- Fujimoto Prize, Special Award (1990)
- Fujimoto Prize, Special Award (1993)
- Medal with Blue Ribbon (1993)
