= Japan Federation of National Public Service Employees' Unions =

Trade union in Japan

The Japan Federation of National Public Service Employees' Unions (Japanese: 日本国家公務員労働組合連合会, Kokko Roren) is a trade union representing public sector workers in Japan.

The union was established on 1 October 1975, to bring together the various public sector unions affiliated with the General Council of Trade Unions of Japan (Sohyo). On formation, it had 87,112 members:

Union	Abbreviation	Membership (1980)
All International Trade and Industry Ministry Workers' Union	Zenshoko	9,801
All Judiciary Administration Employees' Union	Zenshiho	14,848
All Radio Wave Control Agency Workers' Union	Zendenpa	2,127
All Transportation Workers' Union	Zenunyu	?
All Weather Bureau Workers' Union	Zenkisho	4,603
Construction Ministry Workers' Union	Zenkenro	6,541
Education Ministry Employees' Union	Monbushokuso	1,120
Federation of Unions of the Office of Prime Minister	Sorifuroren	1,586
Japan Customs Employees' Union	Zenzeikan	744
Justice Ministry Employees' Union	Zenhomu	10,298
Labor Ministry Workers' Union	Zenrodo	19,769
National Tax Collectors' Union	Zenkokuzei	1,800
Union of Employees of the Harbour Construction Board	Zenkoken	2,857
Welfare Ministry Employees' Union	Zenkosei	3,413
	Zengyokan	886

Membership grew to 138,503 by 1989. That year, Sohyo merged into the Japanese Trade Union Confederation (RENGO). Kokko Roren decided instead to become a founding affiliate of the National Confederation of Trade Unions, although a section which wished to join RENGO split away and formed the Japan Central Federation of National Public Service Employees' Unions. By 2019, the union's membership had fallen to 60,454.

The union's largest affiliates include:

- All Economy, Trade and Industry Labor Union
- All Health and Welfare Ministry Workers' Union
- All Japan National Hospital Workers' Union
- All Judiciary Administration Employees' Union
- Labour Ministry Workers' Union
- Labour Union of MLIT, JMA and Affiliates
- Justice Ministry Employees' Union
- National Tax Collectors' Union
