= Japan Broadcasting Labour Union =

Trade union in Japan

The Japan Broadcasting Labour Union (Japanese: 日本放送労働組合, Nipporo) is a trade union representing workers in the broadcasting sector in Japan.

The union was founded in March 1948, after a split in the official NHK company union. It was a founding affiliate of the General Council of Trade Unions of Japan, and by 1958 it had 7,000 members. Its membership grew to 13,326 by 1970, then fell to 12,876 by 1985. In 1988, it merged with other unions to form the new Federation of All-NHK Labour Unions, while retaining its identity. Since 2017, it has been part of the Japan Federation of Media, Advertising, Motion Picture, and Theater Labor Unions.
