= All Japan Shipbuilding and Engineering Union =

Trade union in Japan

The All-Japan Shipbuilding and Engineering Union (SEU, Japanese: 全日本造船機械労働組合, Zenzōsen, also known as Zen Nihon Zōsen Kikai Rōdō Kumiai) was a trade union in Japan, representing workers in the ship-building and ship repair industry.

The union was established in September 1946, shortly after the end of World War II. Zenzōsen is a federation of individual, enterprise-level unions - the normal model of trades unionism in Japan.

It was initially the dominant union in the Japanese shipbuilding industry, but was eventually eclipsed by the Japan Confederation of Shipbuilding and Engineering Workers' Unions. Zenzōsen was the more militant of the two unions, and was more strongly represented at the smaller shipyards. Zenzōsen was affiliated to the Japanese Socialist Party.

The union affiliated to the Federation of Independent Unions, and by 1970 it had 53,600 members. Later, it transferred to the Japanese Trade Union Confederation. By 1996, its membership was down to 3,226, and in 2016 it dissolved.
