= Tomoko Yoshino =

Japanese trade unionist

- 芳野友子
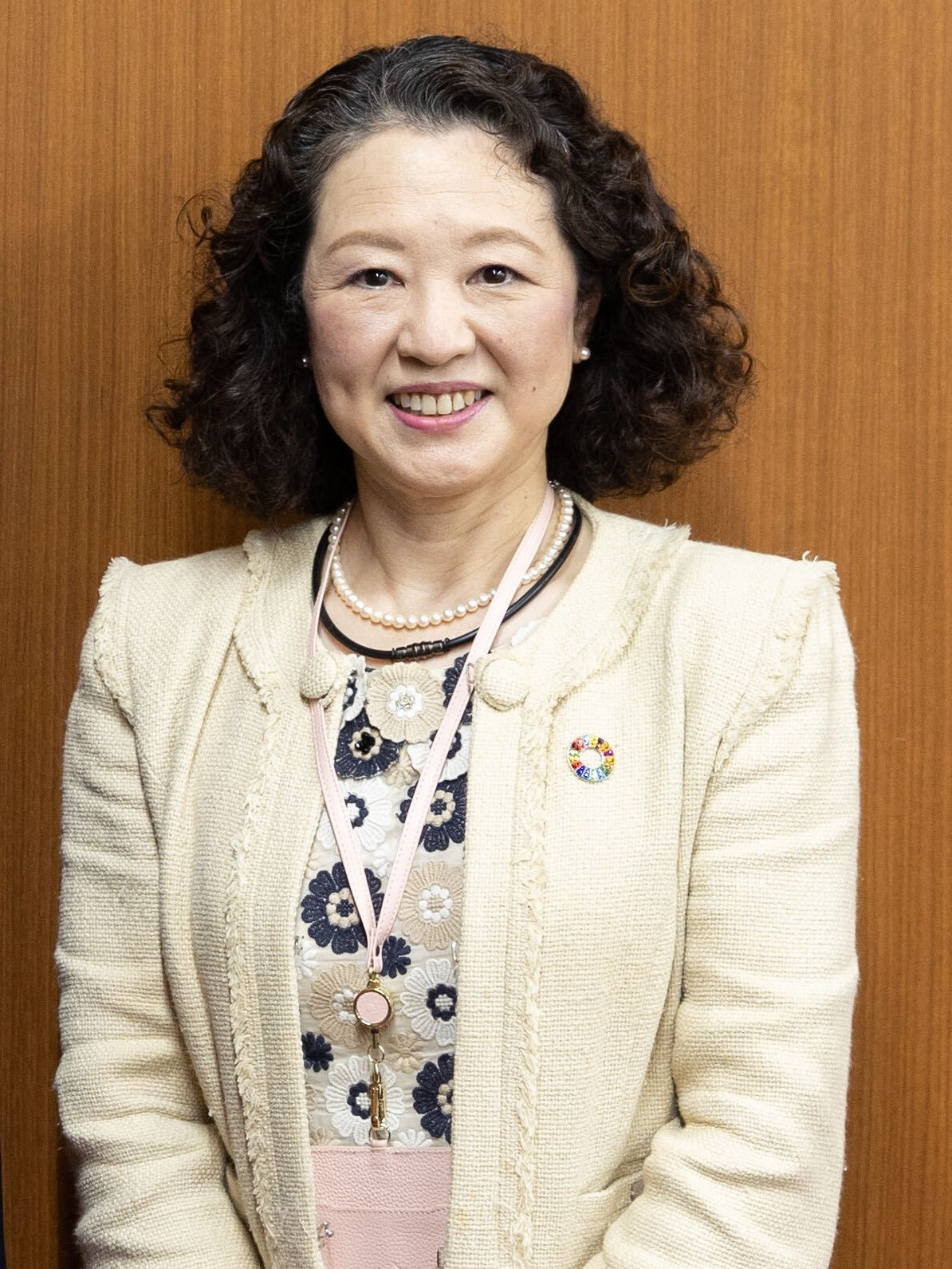
- Yoshino in 2022
- Born: 1965 or 1966 (age 58–59)
- Occupation: Labor union leader
- Known for: President of RENGO

Tomoko Yoshino (芳野友子; born 1965 or 1966) is a Japanese trade unionist. She is the first female president of RENGO, Japan's largest labor organization. In her role at RENGO, she has worked to reduce gender gaps in the Japanese workforce.

Yoshino is also one of a council responsible for implementing prime minister Fumio Kishida's trickle-down "new capitalism" economic policies aimed at addressing income inequality.

== Career ==
Yoshino was born in 1965 or 1966. After high school, she started working at Juki, a company that makes sewing machines, in 1984. She joined the Japanese Association of Metal, Machinery, and Manufacturing Workers (JAM), a manufacturing union.

In 2015, she became vice president of the labor union federation RENGO and deputy head of JAM.

On 6 October 2021, she was promoted to president of RENGO, making her the first female president in the organization's history and the first RENGO president to come from JAM. She was chosen for a two-year term. According to Yoshino, some of her male colleagues encouraged her not to take the job because "it was too difficult for a woman to handle the job in such a difficult time". However, many women in RENGO supported her promotion as a sign of progress. Yoshino said of her decision to accept the role: "I made up my mind that I should never miss a chance to break the glass ceiling by myself".

In her role as chief of RENGO, Yoshino's goals include improving gender equality and diversity as well as supporting casual workers.
