= Japan Federation of Service & Tourism Industries Workers' Unions =

Trade union in Japan

The Japan Federation of Service & Tourism Industries Workers' Unions (STU; Japanese: サービス・ツーリズム産業労働組合連合会, Service Rengo) is a trade union representing workers in the service and tourism industries.

The union was founded in July 2001, when the Japan Federation of Leisure-Service Industries Workers' Unions merged with the Hotel and Restaurant Council of the National Federation of General Workers' Unions. It was affiliated with the Japanese Trade Union Confederation. The union had 44,029 members in 2009, and this grew to 47,454 by 2020.
