= General Federation of Japan Printing and Publishing Workers' Unions =

Trade union in Japan

The General Federation of Japan Printing and Publishing Workers' Unions (Japanese: 全国印刷出版産業労働組合総連合会, Zeninsoren) is a trade union representing workers in the printing industry.

The union was founded in 1953, and affiliated to the General Council of Trade Unions of Japan (Sohyo). By 1970, it had 18,700 members, but fell to 13,376 by 1985.

In 1989, Sohyo merged into the new Japanese Trade Union Confederation, but Zeninsoren instead opted to join the new National Confederation of Trade Unions. By 2019, its membership had fallen to 3,286.
