= National Federation of Construction Workers' Unions =

Trade union in Japan

The National Federation of Construction Workers' Unions (Japanese: 全国建設労働組合総連合, Zenkensoren) is a trade union representing workers in the building industry in Japan.

The union was founded in 1960, with the merger of the General Federation of National Construction Workers' Unions, the National Federation of Construction Industry Workers' Unions, and another union. It affiliated to the Federation of Independent Unions (Churitsuroren), and had a membership of 219,558 by 1970, which grew to 351,816 in 1985. In 1987, Churitsuroren merged into the Japanese Confederation of Labour, but Zenkensoren instead opted to become independent. By 1997, its membership was over 750,000. In March 2020, membership had risen to 1,042,988.
