= Domei =

Domei may refer to:

- Dōmei Tsushin, former news agency in the Empire of Japan
- Japanese Confederation of Labour, former national trade union federation in Japan
