= Japan Federation of Textile and Clothing Workers' Unions =

Trade union in Japan

The Japan Federation of Textile and Clothing Workers' Unions (Japanese: 日本繊維産業労組連合会, Seniroren) was a trade union representing workers in two related industries in Japan.

The union was founded in 1948 as the National Federation of Silk Reelers' Unions (Zensanroren), and was a founding affiliate of the Federation of Independent Unions. In the early 1960s, it began representing all textile and clothing workers, becoming Seniroren, and its membership reached 37,337 in 1963. In 1967, it switched to the General Council of Trade Unions of Japan, and by 1970 its membership had fallen to 20,304.

In the late 1980s, the union became affiliated with the Japanese Trade Union Confederation, but by 1996, its membership had fallen to 5,127. In 2002, it merged with the Japanese Federation of Textile, Garment, Chemical, Mercantile, Food and Allied Industries Workers' Unions and the Japanese Federation of Chemical, Service and General Trade Unions, to form the Japanese Federation of Textile, Chemical, Food, Commercial, Service and General Workers' Unions.
