= Japan Federation of Prefectural and Municipal Workers' Unions =

Trade union in Japan

The Japan Federation of Prefectural and Municipal Workers' Unions (Japanese: 日本自治体労働組合総連合, Jichiroren) is a trade union representing local government workers in Japan.

The union was founded on 17 March 1989 by those members of the All-Japan Prefectural and Municipal Workers' Union who did not wish to be affiliated with the Japanese Trade Union Confederation. Instead, the new union became a founding affiliate of the National Confederation of Trade Unions (Zenroren). It claimed a peak membership of 256,000 in 1996, which by 2019 had fallen to 138,655. At that time, it was the second largest affiliate of Zenroren. Around 15% of its members are temporary or contract staff, and it campaigns for their roles to be made permanent and not outsourced.
