= National Machinery and Metal Workers' Union =

Trade union in Japan

The National Machinery and Metal Workers' Union (Japanese: 全国機械金属労働組合, Zenkikin) was a trade union representing factory workers in Japan.

The union was founded in 1950, and soon afterwards was a founding affiliate of the National Federation Of Industrial Organisations. It grew from 19,822 members in 1958, to 33,283 members in 1970. In 1987, it transferred to the Japanese Trade Union Confederation, but in 1989 it merged with the National Trade Union of Metal and Engineering Workers to form the National Metal and Machinery Workers' Union.
