= Japanese Federation of Chemical Industry Workers' Unions =

Trade union in Japan

The Japanese Federation of Chemical Industry Workers' Unions (Japanese: 全国化学産業労働組合同盟, Kagaku Domei) was a trade union representing workers in various industries in Japan.

The union was established on 16 June 1951, with the merger of unions representing chemical and general workers; rubber workers; and workers in the tyre-manufacturing industry. It affiliated to the General Council of Trade Unions of Japan, and by 1958 it had 41,644 members. The affiliates representing rubber workers split away in 1965, to form the National Federation of Rubber Industry Workers' Unions, and as a result, by 1970 its membership had declined to 32,963. In 1972, it absorbed the All Japan Glass and Bottle Makers' Union. In 1978, it merged with part of the Japanese Federation of Synthetic Chemistry Workers' Unions, to form the Japanese Federation of Chemical Workers' Unions.
