= Association of Neutral Labour Unions =

Japanese federation of trade unions, 1962 to 1987

The Association of Neutral Labour Unions (中立労働組合連絡会議, Chūritsu rōdō kumiai renraku kaigi), better known by its Japanese abbreviation Chūritsu Rōren, was a national trade union federation in Japan from 1956 to 1987.

Chūritsu Rōren was established in 1956 as an association of labor unions affiliated with the General Council of Trade Unions of Japan (Sōhyō), but that were increasingly dismayed by Sōhyō's promotion of contentious non-workplace struggles in support of left-wing political objectives. By calling themselves the "Association of Neutral Labour Unions," Chūritsu Rōren was signaling its "neutral" (chūritsuteki) position in the ideological struggles of the global Cold War.

Initially, Chūritsu Rōren was a loose association still remaining within and not clearly distinguished from Sōhyō, even continuing to share most of its staff with Sōhyō, albeit avoiding any overt affiliation with Sōhyō's main political affiliate, the Japan Socialist Party. Over time, however, Chūritsu Rōren became more conservative and built up its own staff, but continued to co-operate with Sōhyō in many cases.

Although Chūritsu Rōren generally shied away from overtly political actions, the association did participate in the successful struggle in 1958 to defeat the revision of the Police Duties Bill proposed by conservative prime minister Nobusuke Kishi, as well as the ensuing 1960 Anpo protests against revision of the US-Japan Security Treaty, both of which opponents were successfully able to portray as not so much left-right political issues but rather as basic threats to Japanese democracy and civil rights.

After the spectacular failure of the Miike Coal Mine Strike in 1960 and the general discrediting of Sōhyō's political struggles, Chūritsu Rōren increasingly made inroads with unions previously affiliated with Sōhyō during the 1960s. By 1967, the association claimed 1,200,000 members, and reached 1,321,000 members in 1978, almost all in the private sector. That year, it formed a loose association with the National Federation Of Industrial Organisations (Shinsambetsu), intending to merge in the future. In 1987, Chūritsu Rōren merged with both Shinsambetsu and the larger Japanese Confederation of Labour, to form RENGO.

== Affiliates ==
The following unions were affiliated:

Union	Abbreviation	Founded	Left	Reason not affiliated	Membership (1970)	Membership (1985)
All Japan Electric Wire Labour Union	Zendensen	1946	1987	Transferred to Rengo	37,020	43,486
All Japan Federation of Food Industries Workers' Unions	Shokuhinroren	1965	1987	Transferred to Rengo	93,898	66,372
All Japan Oil Workers' Union	Zensekiyu	1947	1987	Transferred to Rengo	24,732	
All Japan Shipbuilding and Machine Workers' Unions	Zenzosenkikai	1946	1987	Transferred to Sohyo	53,600	5,555
Confederation of Movie and Theatre Workers	Eiensoren	1952	1980	Disaffiliated	4,743	2,413
Federation of Rolling Stock Industry Workers' Unions	Sharyororen		1972	Dissolved	18,207	N/A
Japanese Federation of Electric Machine Workers' Unions	Denkiroren	1953	1987	Transferred to Rengo	438,458	632,814
Japan Tourist Bureau Workers' Union	Kotsukosha				8,826	N/A
National Confederation of Beer Brewery Workers' Unions	Zenkokubiiru	1949	1980	Disaffiliated	15,046	13,334
National Federation of Cement Workers' Unions of Japan	Zenkokusemento	1947	1987	Transferred to Rengo	28,348	17,708
National Federation of Ceramic Industry Workers' Unions	Zenyoren	1949	1987	Transferred to Rengo	40,777	23,652
National Federation of Construction Workers' Unions	Zenkensoren	1960	1987	Disaffiliated	219,558	351,816
National Federation of Gas Supply Workers' Unions	Zenkokugasu	1947	1987	Transferred to Rengo	19,403	25,790
National Federation of Hotel Workers' Unions	Hoteruroren	1948	1974	Transferred to Sohyo	6,376	12,383
National Federation of Life Insurance Brokers' Unions	Zengairen		1969	Merged into Seihororen	207,900	N/A
National Federation of Life Insurance Salesmen's Unions	Zenseiho		1969	Merged into Seihororen	56,000	N/A
National Federation of Life Insurance Workers' Unions	Seihororen	1969	1987	Transferred to Rengo	N/A	369,799
Railway Welfare Aid Association Workers' Union	Tetsukoro		1972	Transferred to Sohyo	23,844	N/A
