= Japan Federation of Leisure-Service Industries Workers' Unions =

Trade union in Japan

The Japan Federation of Leisure-Service Industries Workers' Unions (Leisure Service Rengo) was a trade union representing workers in the hospitality, leisure and service industries in Japan.

The union founded in 1948, as the All Japan Federation of Hotel Workers' Unions (Hoteru Roren). It later affiliated to the Federation of Independent Unions, and by 1970 had 6,376 members. However, in 1974 it transferred to the rival General Council of Trade Unions of Japan. From 1989, it was affiliated to the Japanese Trade Union Confederation, and by 1996 it had grown to have 46,900 members. In 2001, it merged with the Hotel and Restaurant Council of the National Federation of General Workers' Unions to form the Japan Federation of Service & Tourism Industries Workers' Unions.
