= Federation of All Japan Foods and Tobacco Workers' Unions =

Trade union in Japan

The Federation of All Japan Foods and Tobacco Workers' Unions (JFU, Japanese: 日本食品関連産業労働組合総連合会, FOOD RENGO) is a trade union representing workers in food processing and related industries in Japan.

The union was founded in 2000, with the merger of the Japan Federation of Foods and Tobacco Workers' Unions and the Food Industry Workers' Unions Council. Like both its predecessors, it is affiliated with the Japanese Trade Union Confederation. It was initially known as the League of Japan Foods and Tobacco Workers' Unions, becoming the JFU in 2002, at which time it had 119,547 members. By 2020, membership had fallen to 105,909.
