= All Japan Metal and Machinery Information Workers' Union =

Trade union in Japan

The All Japan Metal and Machinery Information Workers' Union (JMIU; Japanese: 全日本金属情報機器労働組合) was a trade union representing workers involved in making metal and electronic goods.

The union was established in 1989 by members of the National Trade Union of Metal and Engineering Workers who disagreed with its merger into the National Metal and Machinery Workers' Union. It was affiliated with two new union federations: the National Confederation of Trade Unions and the National Trade Union Council. By 1990, it had 12,000 members. On 31 January 2016, it merged with the Telecommunication Workers' Union, to form the Japan Metal Manufacturing, Information and Telecommunication Workers' Union.
