= Labor Federation of Government Related Organizations =

Trade union in Japan

The Labor Federation of Government Related Organizations (LAFGO; Japanese: 政府関係法人労働組合連合, Seiroren) is a trade union representing workers at quangos in Japan.

The union was founded on 2 November 1960, as the Council of Special Governmental Corporations Workers' Unions (Seirokyo). It affiliated to the General Council of Trade Unions of Japan, and by 1970 it had 10,161 members. From the late 1980s, it was affiliated to the Japanese Trade Union Confederation, and in 1991 it became Seiroren. By 1996, its membership had grown to 33,392. In 2001, it became part of the new Japan Public Sector Union, while maintaining its organisation.
