= All Japan Federation of Teachers' and Staff Unions =

Trade union in Japan

The All Japan Federation of Teachers' and Staff Unions (Japanese: 全日本教職員組合, Zenkyo) is a trade union representing workers in the education sector in Japan.

The union was established in April 1991, when the Japan High School Teachers' Union merged with the recently founded All Japan Council of Teachers and Staff Union. It was affiliated with the National Confederation of Trade Unions (Zenroren). By 2019, it was Zenroren's third-largest affiliate, with 63,349 members.
