= All Japan Municipal Transport Workers' Union =

Trade union in Japan

The All Japan Municipal Transport Workers' Union (Japanese: 全日本自治団体労働組合都市公共交通評議会, Toshiko) was a trade union representing transport workers employed by local authorities in Japan.

The union was established in 1947 and affiliated with the Japanese Federation of Labour, and then from 1950 with the General Council of Trade Unions of Japan (Sohyo). By 1967, it had 69,789 members.

The union became affiliated with the Japanese Trade Union Confederation in the late 1980s, but by 1996 was down to 43,767 members. In 2013, it merged with the All-Japan Prefectural and Municipal Workers' Union.
