= Federation of Tokyo Metropolitan Government Workers' Unions =

Trade union in Japan

The Federation of Tokyo Metropolitan Government Workers ' Unions (Japanese: 東京都労働組合連合会, Tororen) is a trade union representing local government workers in Tokyo.

The union was founded in 1946, and was a founding affiliate of the National Council of Government and Public Workers' Unions. By 1958, it had about 100,000 members, growing to 140,277 in 1970.

In 1989, the union became affiliated with the new National Trade Union Council (Zenrokyo), at which time it had about 200,000 members. By 2019, its membership had fallen to 30,297, but it remained the largest affiliate of Zenrokyo.
