= Japanese Federation of Chemical and General Workers' Unions =

Trade union in Japan

The Japanese Federation of Chemical and General Workers' Unions (Japanese: 全国化学一般労働組合同盟; Zenka Domei) was a trade union representing workers in various industries, especially the chemical industry, in Japan.

The union was established in 1951, affiliated with the Japanese Federation of Labour, and later, with the Japanese Confederation of Labour. In 1958, it had 31,801 members, growing to 88,233 by 1967. It was later a founding affiliate of the Japanese Trade Union Confederation. In 1995, it merged with the National Federation of General Workers' Unions to form the Japanese Federation of Chemical, Service and General Trade Unions.
