= Komakichi Matsuoka =

39th Japanese Speaker of the House of Representatives (1888–1958)

- 松岡 駒吉
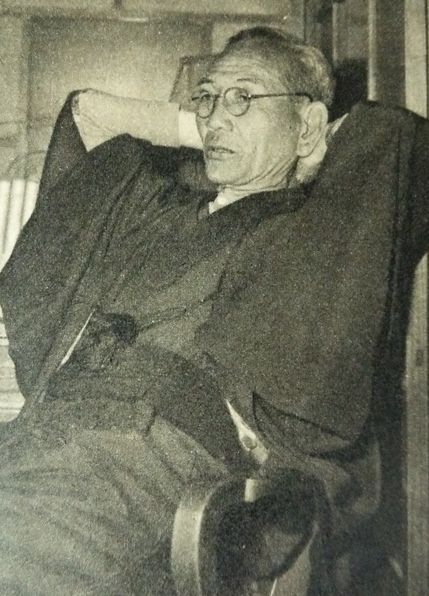
- Matsuoka in 1953

Speaker of the House of Representatives
- In office 21 May 1947 – 23 December 1948
- Monarch: Hirohito
- Deputy: Man'itsu Tanaka
- Preceded by: Takeshi Yamazaki
- Succeeded by: Kijūrō Shidehara

Member of the House of Representatives
- In office 21 May 1947 – 14 August 1958
- Preceded by: Constituency established
- Succeeded by: Yoshirō Kikuchi
- Constituency: Tokyo 2nd

Personal details
- Born: 8 April 1888 Iwami, Tottori, Japan
- Died: 14 August 1958 (aged 70)
- Resting place: Aoyama Cemetery
- Party: Socialist (1946–1958)
- Other political affiliations: SDP (1926–1932); Independent (1932–1946)

Komakichi Matsuoka (松岡駒吉, Matsuoka Komakichi; 8 April 1888 – 14 August 1958) was a Japanese politician and labor activist. Born in Iwami Province (present day Tottori Prefecture), Matsuoka was a steelworker at Japan Steel Works who joined Suzuki Bunji as a business agent at the predecessor to the Japanese Federation of Labour in 1917.

With a growing interest in politics, Matsuoka joined the pro-labour Social Democratic Party in 1926, and ran independently in the 1942 Japanese general election in a failed bid to join Japan's House of Representatives following the labour movement's eventual break up in 1940 due to an inability to organize and need to comply with the demands of Japan's imperialist expansionism in the 1930s.

Following the end of the war, the Japanese Federation of Labour was reborn in 1946 with Matsuoka as its president, and with the backing of the center-left Japan Socialist Party, he was elected to Tokyo's 2nd district on 25 April 1947 in a surprising win for the party with 143 of the 468 seats going to the JSP, with Matsuoka elected as speaker.

The predecessor to today's center-right Liberal Democratic Party retook the reins of government in the 1949 election, although Matsuoka held his seat in the lower house for 5 more terms.

With Japan's entry in the United Nations in December 1956, Matsuoka accompanied Foreign Minister Mamoru Shigemitsu to attend the United Nations General Assembly, and continued to serve his district until dying in office of liver disease on 14 August 1958 at 70 years of age.
