= Japanese Confederation of Aviation Labour =

Trade union in Japan

The Japanese Confederation of Aviation Labour (Japanese: 全日本航空産業労働組合総同盟, KOKU DOMEI) was a trade union representing workers in the aviation industry in Japan.

The union was founded in 1974 and affiliated with the Japanese Confederation of Labour. By 1975, it had 12,400 members. It transferred to the Japanese Trade Union Confederation in the late 1980s, and by 1996 its membership was 15,178. In 1999, it merged with the ANA Labour Union to form the Japan Federation of Aviation Industry Unions.
