= All Japan Federation of Food Industries Workers' Unions =

Trade union in Japan

The All Japan Federation of Food Industries Workers' Unions (Japanese: 全日本食品労働組合連合会, Shokuhin Roren) was a trade union representing workers in the food processing industry of Japan.

The union was founded in 1965 and was affiliated with the Federation of Independent Unions. By 1970, it had 93,898 members, but by 1990, it was down to 58,467 members. By then, it was affiliated with the Japanese Trade Union Confederation. In 1995, it merged with the Japan Tobacco and Allied Workers' Union and the National Federation of Food Industry Workers' Unions, to form the Japan Federation of Foods and Tobacco Workers' Unions.
