= Federation of Non-Life Insurance Workers' Unions of Japan =

Trade union in Japan

The Federation of Non-Life Insurance Workers' Unions of Japan (FNIU; Japanese: 損害保険労働組合連合会, Sonpo Roren) is a trade union representing workers in the insurance industry in Japan.

The union was founded in 1967, with the merger of the Zennihonsongai Labor Union, the Koa Labour Union, and the Ozumi Shoji Labour Union. The union remained independent until 1997, when it became affiliated with the Japanese Trade Union Confederation. It had 68,027 members by 2009, and grew to 94,696 members by 2020.
