= Japanese Federation of Chemistry Workers' Unions =

Trade union in Japan

The Japanese Federation of Chemistry Workers' Unions (Kagaku League) was a trade union representing workers in the chemical and pharmaceutical industries in Japan.

The union was established in 1998, when the Japanese Federation of Synthetic Chemistry Workers' Unions merged with the All Japan Chemistry Workers' Union. Like both its predecessors, it became affiliated with the Japanese Trade Union Confederation. By 2002, it had 104,000 members. That year, it merged with the National Organization of All Chemical Workers, the Japan Confederation of Petroleum Industry Workers' Unions, and the National Federation of Cement Workers' Unions of Japan to form the Japan Federation of Energy and Chemistry Workers' Unions.
