= Japanese Federation of Textile, Chemical, Commerce, Food and General Services Workers' Unions =

Trade union in Japan

The Japanese Federation of Textile, Chemical, Commerce, Food and General Services Workers' Unions (Japanese: 全国繊維化学食品流通サービス一般労働組合同盟, UA Zensen) is a trade union representing workers in various sectors in Japan.

== History ==
The union was founded on 6 November 2012, with merger of the Japanese Federation of Textile, Chemical, Food, Commercial, Service and General Workers' Unions and the Japan Federation of Service and Distributive Workers' Unions. Like both its predecessors, it affiliated to the Japanese Trade Union Confederation. It was the largest industrial trade union in the country, with 1,641,955 on formation, and by 2020, this had grown to 1,790,000 members.

== Presidents ==
2012: Naoto Ohmi
2016: Akihiko Matsuura
