= Nobuaki Koga =

Japanese unionist (born 1952)

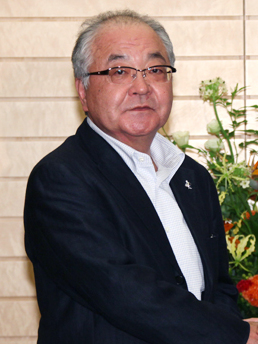

Nobuaki Koga (古賀 伸明, Koga Nobuaki, born February 23, 1952) is a Japanese unionist. From 2009 to 2015, he served as president of Rengo, the largest national trade union federation in Japan, having previously been its general secretary.

== Prior to Rengo leadership ==
Koga was born in Fukuoka, and studied engineering at the University of Miyazaki and then joined Matsushita Electric Industrial Co., Ltd, which is now known as Panasonic. He joined Matsushita Electric Industrial Workers’ Union in April 1975, joined the board of the union in 1986, became general secretary in July 1994 and then president in July 1996. In July 2002 he was elected as president of the Japanese Electrical, Electronic & Information Union (DENKI RENGO), and in September 2004 he became president of the Japan Council of Metalworkers’ Unions (IMF-JC).

== Rengo leadership ==
In September 2005 he was elected general secretary of Rengo unopposed, and in October 2009 he was elected to succeed Tsuyoshi Tagaki as president. He was re-elected in 2011.

Rengo is affiliated with the Democratic Party of Japan, but on June 28, 2012 Koga made a speech at Liberal Democratic Party headquarters stating that Rengo may reconsider its future.
