= Japan Federation of Medical Workers' Unions =

Trade union in Japan

The Japan Federation of Medical Workers' Unions (Japanese: 日本医療労働組合連合会, Nihon Iroren) is a trade union representing workers in the healthcare sector in Japan.

The union was founded on 31 August 1957, and affiliated with the General Council of Trade Unions of Japan (Sohyo). By 1970, it had 65,646 members, rising to 144,161 in 1985.

In 1989, Sohyo merged into the new Japanese Trade Union Confederation, but Nihon Iroren instead opted to join the new National Confederation of Trade Unions (Zenroren). By 2019, it was Zenroren's largest affiliate, with 154,379 members.
