= Japan Tobacco and Allied Workers' Union =

Trade union in Japan

The Japan Tobacco and Allied Workers' Union (Japanese: たばこ産業労働組合共闘会議, Zentabako) was a trade union representing workers in the tobacco industry in Japan.

The union was founded in 1985, as a split from the All Monopoly Corporation Workers' Union, and it affiliated to the General Council of Trade Unions of Japan. On formation, it had 27,599 members, but this steadily declined, and by 1990, it was down to 19,474 members. By then, it had become affiliated with the Japanese Trade Union Confederation. In 1995, it merged with the All Japan Federation of Food Industries Workers' Unions and the National Federation of Food Industry Workers' Unions, to form the Japan Federation of Foods and Tobacco Workers' Unions.
