= National Federation of Agricultural, Forestry and Fishery Corporations' Workers' Unions =

Trade union in Japan

The National Federation of Agricultural, Forestry and Fishery Corporations' Workers' Unions (Japanese: 全国農林漁業団体職員労働組合連合, ZENKOKU NODANRO) is a trade union representing workers in agricultural co-operatives and related organisations in Japan.

In 1989, the National Federation of Agricultural Mutual Aid Societies Employees' Unions decided to become a founding affiliate of the National Trade Union Council, but some of its affiliates disliked the left-wing stance of the new federation. They split away to form Zenkoku Nodanro, which initially had 16,578 members. It soon affiliated to the Japanese Trade Union Confederation, and by 2020 it had 13,725 members.
