= National Trade Union of Metal and Engineering Workers =

Trade union in Japan

The National Trade Union of Metal and Engineering Workers (Zenkokukinzoku) was a trade union representing machining workers in Japan.

The union was founded in 1947 and was initially chaired by Kanson Arahata. It was a founding affiliate of the General Council of Trade Unions of Japan. By 1967, it had 208,831 members, which had declined to 145,000 by 1988. In 1989, it merged with the National Machinery and Metal Workers' Union to form the National Metal and Machinery Workers' Union. A minority of members instead split away to form the All Japan Metal and Machinery Information Workers' Union.
