= Japanese Federation of Chemical, Service and General Trade Unions =

Trade union in Japan

The Japanese Federation of Chemical, Service and General Trade Unions (Japanese: 日本化学・サービス・一般労働組合連合, CSG RENGO) was a general union, mostly representing workers in the service sector, and the chemical industry, in Japan.

The union was established in 1995, with the merger of the Japanese Federation of Chemical and General Workers' Unions and the National Federation of General Workers' Unions. By the following year it had 237,474 members. It became affiliated with the Japanese Trade Union Confederation. In 2002, it merged with the Japanese Federation of Textile, Garment, Chemical, Mercantile, Food and Allied Industries Workers' Unions and the small Japan Federation of Textile and Clothing Workers' Unions, to form the Japanese Federation of Textile, Chemical, Food, Commercial, Service and General Workers' Unions.
