= All Japan Chemistry Workers' Union =

Trade union in Japan

The All Japan Chemistry Workers' Union (JCWU, Japanese: 全国化学, Zenkoku Kagaku) was a trade union representing workers in the chemical industry in Japan.

The union was founded on 20 October 1987, by 30 local unions which were expelled from the Japanese Federation of Synthetic Chemistry Workers' Unions (Goka Roren), due to an internal dispute. The union affiliated to the Japanese Trade Union Confederation, initially with 25,000 members, although by 1996, this had declined to only 10,540. In October 1998, the union merged with Goka Roren, to form the Japanese Federation of Chemistry Workers' Unions.
