= Japan Federation of Aviation Industry Unions =

Trade union in Japan

The Japan Federation of Aviation Industry Unions (JFAIU, Japanese: 航空連合, Koku Rengo) is a trade union representing workers in the aviation industry in Japan.

The union was established in 1999, when the Japanese Confederation of Aviation Labour merged with the ANA Labour Union. It affiliated to the Japanese Trade Union Confederation. In 2009, the union had 36,183 members, and by 2020 its membership had grown to 41,419.
