= National Democratic Union of Casual Workers =

Trade union in Japan

The National Democratic Union of Casual Workers (Japanese: 全国民主自由労働組合, Zenminro) was a trade union representing workers in the Japanese construction industry who were not on contracts.

The union was founded in 1955 and later affiliated to the Japanese Confederation of Labour. It had 15,973 members in 1967, but by 1985 its membership had fallen to only 5,428.
