= Senshū Suetaka =

Japanese politician and nobleman (born 1875)

Baron Junior Fourth Rank Senshū Suetaka
- 千秋 季隆
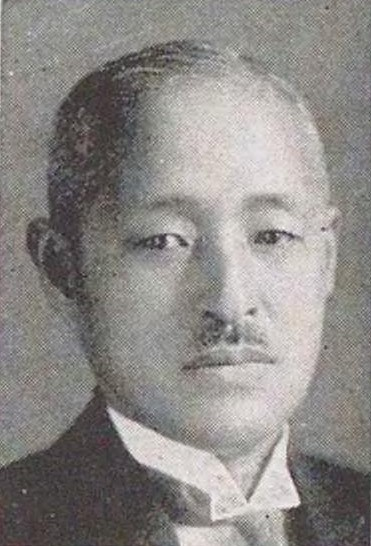
- Baron Senshū Suetaka in 1937

Member of the House of Peers
- In office 10 July 1904 – 12 May 1941 Elected by the Barons

Personal details
- Born: 10 October 1875 Atsuta, Aichi, Japan
- Died: 12 May 1941 (aged 65)
- Party: Kōseikai
- Spouse(s): Ano Naruko; Noda Han
- Children: 2
- Education: Tokyo Imperial University

Baron Senshū Suetaka (千秋 季隆; 10 October 1875 – 12 May 1941) was a Japanese nobleman, politician, businessman and educator. He served as Director of Office of Japanese Classics Research and was a member of the House of Peers. He was also a director of Bisan Bank and Owari Savings Bank, and a professor at Gakushuin University.

== Life ==
Senshū was born on 10 October 1875, in Atsuta, Aichi District, Aichi Prefecture (present-day Atsuta, Nagoya), the second son of Senshū Suetomi, the High Priest of Atsuta Shrine. Following the death of his elder brother Sueyoshi, he became heir apparent to his father in 1877. In 1884, he conferred peerage as Baron.

Senshū studied Japanese literature at the Tokyo Imperial University, graduating in 1900. He was a lecturer at Kokugakuin University and Waseda University before becoming a professor at Gakushuin University (Peers' School). He was also a special editor for Tokyo Imperial University Library's book catalog.

He served as Director of Office of Japanese Classics Research and councilor of the Institute of Divinities. He was also a member of the Religious Institutions Inspection Council and the Shinto Shrine Inspection Council.

In the business world, he served as a director of Bisan Bank and Owari Savings Bank, as well as inspector of Kumgangsan Electric Railway.

On 10 July 1904, Senshū was elected to the House of Peers as a baron. He was a member of the Kōseikai, and stayed in office until his death. Senshū was awarded the court rank of Junior Fourth Rank on 26 December 1908.

Senshū died on 12 May 1941, aged 65.

== Family ==
- First wife: Senshū Naruko (daughter of Viscount Ano Sanemitsu)
- Second wife: Senshū Han (daughter of Noda Yūjirō)
  - Daughter: Takaoka Mikiko (wife of Viscount Takaoka Kazusue, mother of Viscount Sueaki Takaoka)
  - Adopted son: Senshū Suetaka (biological son of Baron Kitakawahara Kimiumi)

== Publications ==
- Senshū Suetaka, Akabori Matajirō (1901). Heike Monogatari: Kokubun Kōyō. Tōkyō Senmongakkō Shuppanbu.
- Senshū Suetaka, Okada Masayoshi (1906). Nara-jidai Bunpan. Dainippon Tosho.
