= Confederation of Japan Automobile Workers' Unions =

Trade union in Japan

- 全日本自動車産業労働組合総連合会
- Abbreviation: JAW
- Established: 1972; 54 years ago
- Merger of: Federation of Japan Automobile Workers' Unions & Zenkoku Jidosha
- Type: Trade union
- Location: Japan
- Fields: Auto manufacturing
- Members: 784,777 (2020)
- Official language: Japanese
- Key people: Ichiro Shoji
- Affiliations: RENGO
- Website: www.jaw.or.jp/en/

The Confederation of Japan Automobile Workers' Unions (JAW, Japanese: 全日本自動車産業労働組合総連合会, Jidōsha Sōren) is a trade union representing workers in the car manufacturing industry in Japan.

From the early 1960s, most car workers' unions in Japan were part of one of two federations: the Federation of Japan Automobile Workers' Unions, led by the Nissan Union, and Zenkoku Jidosha, led by the Toyota Union, and established in 1962. Encouraged by the International Metalworkers' Federation, in 1965, they established a forum to discuss matters of mutual interest. In 1972, this and the two federations were replaced by the JAW. The new union was led by president Ichiro Shoji, and had around 500,000 members.

While the union did not initially affiliate to a trade union federation, in 1989 it became a founding affiliate of the Japanese Trade Union Confederation. At this time, it was the second largest union in the country, with 704,000 members. As of 2020, its membership had grown further, to 784,777.
