= Japanese Rubber Workers' Union Confederation =

Trade union in Japan

The Japanese Rubber Workers' Union Confederation (JRC, Japanese: 全日本ゴム産業労働組合総連合, Gomu Rengo) is a trade union representing workers in the rubber industry in Japan.

The union was founded in 1992, with the merger of the National Federation of Rubber Industry Workers' Unions and some smaller unions. Like its largest predecessor, it was affiliated with the Japanese Trade Union Confederation, and by 1996, it had 62,307 members. By 2020, its membership had fallen to 41,023.
