= National Federation of Agricultural Mutual Aid Societies Employees' Unions =

Trade union in Japan

The National Federation of Agricultural Mutual Aid Societies Employees' Unions (Japanese: 全国農業協同組合労働組合連合会, Zennokyo Roren) is a trade union representing workers at agricultural co-operatives and related organisations in Japan.

The union was founded in 1956, and by 1970 it had 74,013 members. Long independent, in 1989 it was involved in establishing the National Trade Union Council, to which some of its local unions are affiliated, although this led others to split away and form the National Federation of Agricultural, Forestry and Fishery Corporations' Workers' Unions. The union also affiliated to the new National Confederation of Trade Unions, and by 1990 it had 68,423 members.

In 1991, the union merged into the All Japan Day Workers' Union, which renamed itself as the "Construction and Rural and General Workers' Union". It retained its identity, and since 1999 it has formed a section of the All Japan Construction, Transport and General Workers' Union.
