= Japan Federation of Basic Industry Workers' Unions =

Trade union in Japan

The Japan Federation of Basic Industry Workers' Unions (JBU, Japanese: 日本基幹産業労働組合連合会, Kikanroren) is a trade union representing metalworkers and shipbuilders in Japan.

The union was established on 9 September 2003, with the merger of the Japanese Federation of Iron and Steel Workers' Unions, the Japan Confederation of Shipbuilding and Engineering Workers' Unions, and the Japanese Metal Mine Workers' Union. Like all of its predecessors, it became affiliated with the Japanese Trade Union Confederation. As of 2009, the union had 248,781 members. In 2014, the Japan Construction Trade Union Confederation merged into the JBU, by which time the union had grown to around 275,000 members.
