= National Forestry Workers' Union of Japan =

Trade union in Japan

The National Forestry Workers' Union of Japan (Japanese: 日本林業労働組合, Nichirinro) was a trade union representing forestry and timber workers in Japan.

The union was founded in 1965, and affiliated to the Japanese Confederation of Labour. By 1970, it had 10,062 members. It transferred to the Japanese Trade Union Confederation in the late 1980s, but by 1996, its membership was down to 2,020. In 2006, it merged into the Japanese Federation of Forest and Wood Workers' Union.
