= Japanese Federation of Pulp and Paper Workers' Unions =

Trade union in Japan

The Japanese Federation of Pulp and Paper Workers' Unions (JPW, Japanese: 日本紙パルプ紙加工産業労働組合連合会, Kamipa Rengo) is a trade union representing workers in the paper manufacturing industry in Japan.

The union was founded in 1988, with the merger of the National Federation of Paper and Pulp Industry Workers' Unions, the National Council of Paper and Pulp Workers' Unions, the General Federation of Paper and Pulp Processing Workers' Unions, and the Paper and Pulp Industry Workers Unions Consultative Council. It affiliated to the recently founded Japanese Trade Union Confederation, and by 1996 had 52,957 members. By 2020, its membership had fallen to 25,453.
