= Federation of All-NHK Labour Unions =

Trade union in Japan

The Federation of All-NHK Labour Unions (Japanese: NHK関連労働組合連合会, NHK Roren) was a trade union representing workers at the Japan Broadcasting Corporation (NHK).

The union was founded on 1 July 1988, with the merger of the Japan Broadcasting Labour Union and three small trade unions, bringing together 13,869 members. It was affiliated with the Japanese Trade Union Confederation. By 1996, its membership had fallen slightly to 11,584. In October 2017, it merged with the National Cinema and Theater Workers' Union to form the Japan Federation of Media, Advertising, Motion Picture, and Theater Labor Unions.
