= National Federation of Automobile Transport Workers =

Trade union in Japan

The National Federation of Automobile Transport Workers (Japanese: 全国自動車交通労働組合連合会, Zenjiko Roren) is a trade union representing passenger vehicle drivers in Japan.

The union was founded in 1947, and later affiliated to the General Council of Trade Unions of Japan. By 1970, it had 58,577 members. From the late 1980s, it has been affiliated to the Japanese Trade Union Confederation. It still had 35,285 members in 2009, but by 2020 its membership had fallen to 9,515.
