= Japanese Confederation of National Tax Unions =

Trade union in Japan

The Japanese Confederation of National Tax Unions (JCNTU; Japanese: 国税労働組合総連合, Kokuzei Roso) is a trade union representing workers in the National Tax Agency in Japan.

The union was founded in 1958, as a split from the National Tax Collectors' Union. It affiliated to the Japanese Confederation of Labour, and by 1967 it had 10,275 members. At the end of the 1980s, it transferred to the Japanese Trade Union Confederation, and by 1996 its membership had risen to 40,128. In February 2001, it became part of the Japan Public Sector Union, but retains its identity as an affiliate.
