= Japanese Federation of Textile, Chemical, Food, Commercial, Service and General Workers' Unions =

Trade union in Japan

The Japanese Federation of Textile, Chemical, Food, Commercial, Service and General Workers' Unions (Japanese: ＵＩゼンセン同盟 UI ZENSEN Alliance) was a trade union representing workers in various industries in Japan.

The trade union was established in 2002, when Zensendomei merged with the Japanese Federation of Chemical, Service and General Trade Unions and the small Japan Federation of Textile and Clothing Workers' Unions. Like all of its predecessors, it was affiliated with the Japanese Trade Union Confederation. The union sponsored politicians affiliated to the Democratic Party of Japan. The union had 790,289 members in 2003, and sought to expand by recruiting part-time and agency workers. By 2012, it had around 1,400,000 members. That year, it merged with the Japan Federation of Service and Distributive Workers' Unions, to form the Japanese Federation of Textile, Chemical, Commerce, Food and General Services Workers' Unions.

== Presidents ==
2002: Tsuyoshi Takagi
2005:
