= Federation of Electrical Workers' Unions of Japan =

Trade union in Japan

The Federation of Electrical Workers' Unions of Japan (Japanese: 全国電力労働組合連合会, Denroren) was a trade union representing workers in the power generation industry in Japan.

The union was established in 1954 by various local unions, most of which had previously been affiliated with the Japan Electric Industry Labor Union, which was dissolved in 1952. It was a founding affiliate of the Japanese Confederation of Labour and by 1967, it had 128,939 members. In 1981, it merged into a new organization, The Federation of Electric Power Related Industry Workers' Unions of Japan.
