= National Federation of Paper and Pulp Industry Workers' Unions =

Trade union in Japan

The National Federation of Paper and Pulp Industry Workers' Unions (Japanese: 全国紙パルプ産業労働組合連合会, Kamiparoren) was a trade union representing workers in the paper making industry in Japan.

The union was established in 1947 and was a founding affiliate of the General Council of Trade Unions of Japan. By 1967, it had 61,528 members. In 1988, it merged with the National Council of Paper and Pulp Workers' Unions, the General Federation of Paper and Pulp Processing Workers' Unions, and the Paper and Pulp Industry Workers Unions Consultative Council, to form the Japanese Federation of Pulp and Paper Workers' Unions.
