= Japan High School Teachers' Union =

Trade union in Japan

The Japan High School Teachers' Union (Japanese: 日本高等学校教職員組合, Nikkokyo) was a trade union representing workers at high schools in Japan.

The union was founded in 1956, when the All Japan High School Teachers' Union merged with some small, independent teachers' unions. It became affiliated with the National Council of Government and Public Workers' Unions and, although initially opposed to the Japan Teachers' Union, by 1959 the two had agreed to merge at some point in the future. Many members of Nikkokyo opposed this plan, and the merger plan was dropped.

By 1980, the union had 30,747 members, and in 1990 membership stood at 29,186. In April 1991, the union merged with the recently founded All Japan Council of Teachers and Staff Union, to form the All Japan Federation of Teachers' and Staff Unions.
