= Japanese Electrical, Electronic and Information Union =

Trade union in Japan

The Japanese Electrical, Electronic and Information Union (Japanese: 全日本電機・電子・情報関連産業労働組合連合会 Denki Rengo) is a trade union representing private sector workers in Japan, in three related industries.

The union was founded in 1953 as the Japanese Federation of Electric Machine Workers' Unions (Denki Roren). In 1962, it became affiliated with the Federation of Independent Unions (Churitsuroren), becoming its largest affiliate; by 1967, it had 402,173 members. In 1987, it transferred to Churitsuroren's successor, the Japanese Trade Union Confederation, and in 1992 it was renamed the "Japanese Electrical, Electronic and Information Union." By 1996, it had 764,658 members, but this fell to 569,285 by 2020.
