= Chain Store Labor Unions Council =

Trade union in Japan

The Chain Store Labor Unions Council (Japanese: チェーンストア労働組合協議会, CHAIN RENGO) was a trade union representing retail workers in Japan.

The union was established in 1970, and by 1983 it had 40,000 members. It remained unaffiliated for many years, but in 1989 became a founding affiliate of the Japanese Trade Union Confederation. By 1996, its membership was 40,944. On 4 July 2001, it merged with the Japan Federation of Commercial Workers' Unions and the Seven Department Store Unions' Council, to form the Japan Federation of Service and Distributive Workers' Unions.
