= General Federation of Ship Building Workers' Unions =

Trade union in Japan

The General Federation of Ship Building Workers' Unions (Zosensoren) was a trade union representing workers in the shipbuilding industry in Japan.

The union was established in 1951. It was affiliated with the Japanese Federation of Labour, and by 1958 had 28,462 members. Next, it became affiliated with the Japanese Confederation of Labour, and by 1967 had grown to 58,344 members.

The union was keen on merging with smaller competitors. In 1972, it achieved this, when it joined the new Japan Confederation of Shipbuilding and Engineering Workers' Unions.
