= Japan Federation of Electric Wire Workers' Unions =

Trade union in Japan

The Japan Federation of Electric Wire Workers' Unions (JEWU, Japanese: 全日本電線関連産業労働組合連合会, Zendensen) is a trade union representing workers involved in making electric wires in Japan.

The union was founded in 1946 and later became a founding affiliate of the Federation of Independent Unions. By 1970, it had 37,020 members. Since the late 1980s, it has been affiliated with the Japanese Trade Union Confederation. By 2020, its membership had fallen to 24,757.
