= Japanese Federation of Forest and Wood Workers' Union =

Trade union in Japan

The Japanese Federation of Forest and Wood Workers' Union (JFFWU; Japanese: 全日本森林林業木材関連産業労働組合連合会, Sinrin Roren) is a trade union representing forestry and wood workers in Japan.

The union was established on 3 October 1989, when the National Forest Workers' Union of Japan merged with a rival union. It became affiliated with the Japanese Trade Union Confederation, and by 1996 it had 21,278 members. In 2006, it was joined by the National Forestry Workers' Union of Japan. However, it has steadily lost members, and by 2020 its membership was down to 5,362.
