= Japan Federation of Transport Workers' Unions =

Trade union in Japan

The Japan Federation of Transport Workers' Unions (JFT, Japanese: 全国交通運輸労働組合総連合, Kotsu Roren) is a trade union representing workers in the transport sector in Japan.

The union was established in 9 November 1964, with the merger of the National Federation of Transport Workers' Unions and the National Council of Bus Workers' Unions. It became affiliated with the Japanese Confederation of Labour, and by 1967, it had 75,786 members. It transferred to the Japanese Trade Union Confederation in the late 1980s, but by 2020 its membership had declined to 45,579.
