= Japan Federation of Foods and Tobacco Workers' Unions =

Trade union in Japan

The Japan Federation of Foods and Tobacco Workers' Unions (Shokuhin Rengo) was a trade union representing workers in food processing and related industries in Japan.

The union was established in 1995, when the All Japan Federation of Food Industries Workers' Unions merged with the National Federation of Food Industry Workers' Unions and the Japan Tobacco and Allied Workers' Union. It was a founding affiliate of the Japanese Trade Union Confederation, and by 1996 had 116,747 members. In 2000, it merged with the Food Industry Workers' Unions Council to form the Federation of All Japan Foods and Tobacco Workers' Unions.
