= Japanese Metal Industrial Workers' Union =

Trade union in Japan

The Japanese Metal Industrial Workers' Union (Japanese: ゼンキン連合, Zenkindomei) was a trade union representing metal engineering workers in Japan.

The union founded in 1951, and affiliated with the Japanese Federation of Labour. It later joined the Japanese Confederation of Labour (Domei), and by 1967 it was its second-largest affiliate, with 220,044 members. In 1987, it moved to Domei's successor, the Japanese Trade Union Confederation. On 9 September 1999, it merged with the National Metal and Machinery Workers' Union to form JAM.
