= Valery Burati =

- Born: April 12, 1908
- Died: July 18, 1988 (aged 80)
- Known for: Japan, Supreme Commander of the Allied Powers, Sohyo

Valery Burati (1908–1988) was a union organizer in the United States and the acting chief of the Labor Division of Supreme Commander of the Allied Powers (SCAP) from 1948 to 1951 during the US occupation of Japan, played an important role in the formation of Sohyo (General Council of Trade Unions of Japan), the predominantly public sector union confederation.
