= The Federation of Gas Workers' Unions of Japan =

Trade union in Japan

The Federation of Gas Workers' Unions of Japan (Japanese: 全国ガス労働組合連合会, Zenkoku Gas) is a trade union representing workers in the gas supply industry in Japan.

The union was founded in 1947, and later affiliated to the Federation of Independent Unions. By 1970, it had 19,403 members. In 1989, it affiliated to the Japanese Trade Union Confederation. By 2020, it had 23,248 members.
