= Federation of Japan Automobile Workers' Unions =

Trade union in Japan

The Federation of Japan Automobile Workers' Unions (Japanese: の自動車労連, Jidosharoren) was a trade union representing vehicle workers in Japan.

The All Japan Auto Workers' Union was founded in 1948 and engaged heavily in industrial action, but it dissolved in 1954. The following year, 29 surviving local unions formed Jidosharoren, a more conservative federation which focused on working in partnership with management. The new union was centered on workers at Nissan. It was affiliated with the All-Japan Trade Union Congress, and although it initially had only 9,000 members, it grew steadily and by 1967, it had 118,174 members.

In 1964, the union was affiliated with the new Japanese Confederation of Labour. The following year, encouraged by the International Metalworkers' Federation, it formed the Council of Japan Automobile Workers' Unions, a forum to discuss matters of mutual interest with the rival Zenkoku Jidosha. In 1972, the council was succeeded by the Confederation of Japan Automobile Workers' Unions, into which Jidosharoren merged.
