= National Forest Workers' Union of Japan =

Trade union in Japan

The National Forest Workers' Union of Japan (Japanese: 全国山林労働組合, Zenrinya) was a trade union representing workers in the forestry and timber industries in Japan.

The union was founded in 1959, and affiliated to the General Council of Trade Unions of Japan. By 1967, it had 64,911 members. In 1989, it merged with a rival union, to form the Japanese Federation of Forest and Wood Workers' Union.
