= National Federation of Rubber Industry Workers' Unions =

Trade union in Japan

The National Federation of Rubber Industry Workers' Unions (Japanese: ゴム労連, Gomu Roren) was a trade union representing workers in the rubber industry, principally the manufacture of tyres and footwear, in Japan.

The union was founded in 1965, as a split from the Japanese Federation of Chemical Industry Workers' Unions. It affiliated to the General Council of Trade Unions of Japan, and by 1970 it had 23,460 members. It transferred to the Japanese Trade Union Confederation in 1989, and in 1992 it merged into the new Japanese Rubber Workers' Union Confederation.
