= Japan Federation of Service and Distributive Workers' Unions =

Trade union in Japan

The Japan Federation of Service and Distributive Workers' Unions (JSD, Japanese: 日本サービス・流通労働組合連合) was a trade union representing workers in retail and related sectors in Japan.

The union was established on 4 July 2001, with the merger of the Japan Federation of Commercial Workers' Unions, the Chain Store Labor Unions Council, and the Seven Department Store Unions' Council. On formation, it had around 180,000 members. Like its three larger predecessors, it was affiliated with the Japanese Trade Union Confederation. On 9 November 2012, it merged with Japanese Federation of Textile, Chemical, Food, Commercial, Service and General Workers' Unions to form the Japanese Federation of Textile, Chemical, Commerce, Food and General Services Workers' Unions.
