= All Japan Garrison Forces Labor Union =

Trade union in Japan

The All Japan Garrison Forces Labour Union (GFLU; Japanese: 全駐留軍労働組合, Zenchuro) is a trade union representing civilian workers for the United States Armed Forces in Okinawa.

The union was founded on 1 September 1946, and in 1950 it was a founding affiliate of the General Council of Trade Unions of Japan. By 1958, it had 81,753 members. It undertook industrial action for pensions in 1954, a fairer wage system in 1963, against redundancies in 1964, and for higher pensions in 1968. With declining employment in the area, by 1970 the union had only 25,320 members.

From the late 1980s, the union was affiliated to the Japanese Trade Union Confederation, and by 1996 its membership had fallen to 14,314. In 2001, it joined the new Japan Public Sector Union, while maintaining its organisation.
