= The Federation of Electric Power Related Industry Workers' Unions of Japan =

Trade union in Japan

The Federation of Electric Power Related Industry Workers' Unions of Japan (Japanese: 全国電力関連産業労働組合総連合, Denryoku Soren) is a trade union representing workers in the electric power industry in Japan.

The Council of Electric Power Related Industry Workers' Union of Japan was established in 1969, bringing together nine regional unions, which themselves comprised a total of 108 local unions, and 178,742 members. The most important of these was the Federation of Electrical Workers' Unions of Japan. In 1981, the council was replaced by Denryoku Soren, a more centralised organisation, which by this time had 209,523 members.

The union was a founding member of the Japanese Private Sector Trade Union Confederation in 1987, by which point it had 218,000 members. It was then a founder of the Japanese Trade Union Confederation, in 1989. In 1996, it absorbed the small National Council of Japanese Electric Powers Workers. By 2020, its membership had fallen slightly, to 208,996.
