= National Federation of Consumers' Cooperatives Workers' Unions =

Trade union in Japan

The National Federation of Consumers' Cooperatives Workers' Unions (Japanese: 全国生協労働組合連合会, Seikyororen) is a trade union representing workers in consumer co-operatives in Japan.

The union was established in 1956, and by 1970 it had 74,013 members, then grew to a peak of 93,955 in 1983. Long unaffiliated, in 1990 it joined the new National Confederation of Trade Unions (Zenroren). By 1970, it had 65,646 members, rising to 144,161 in 1985. In 2019, it had 63,135 members, making it Zenroren's fourth largest affiliate.
