= All Japan Federation of Metal Miners' Unions =

Trade union in Japan

The All Japan Federation of Metal Miners' Unions (Japanese: 全日本金属鉱山労働組合連合会, Zenko) was a trade union representing ore miners in Japan.

The union was founded in 1947, and it later affiliated to the General Council of Trade Unions of Japan. By 1958, it had 57,000 members, although membership fell to 31,984 by 1970, and only 10,290 in 1980, in line with a decline in employment in the industry. In 1982, it merged into the new All Japan Federation of Non-Ferrous Metal Workers' Unions.
