= Justice Ministry Employees' Union =

Trade union in Japan

The Justice Ministry Workers' Union (Japanese: 全法務省労働組合, Zenhomu) is a trade union representing workers at the Ministry of Justice in Japan.

The union was founded in 1947, and was soon affiliated with the National Council of Government and Public Workers' Unions, and later with the General Council of Trade Unions of Japan (Sohyo). In 1975, it became part of the new Japan Federation of National Public Service Employees' Unions, while retaining its separate identity. In 1980, the union had 10,298 members, but by 2021 this had fallen to around 5,000.
