= All Japan Federative Council of Bank Labours' Unions =

Trade union in Japan

The All Japan Federative Council of Bank Labours' Unions (Japanese: 全国銀行員組合連合会議, ZENGIN RENGO) is a trade union representing workers at affiliates of the Second Association of Regional Banks in Japan.

The union was founded in 1967 as the National Federation of Mutual Bank Employees' Unions, and by 1970 it had 11,700 members. It was long independent, but in 1989 it renamed itself Zengin Rengo, and became affiliated with the new Japanese Trade Union Confederation. By 2020, the union had 15,008 members.
