= All Judiciary Administration Employees' Union =

Trade union in Japan

The All Judiciary Administration Employees' Union (Japanese: 全司法労働組合, Zenshiho) is a trade union representing workers in the Japanese judicial system.

The union was founded on 25 January 1947, and was affiliated with the National Council of Government and Public Workers' Unions. It later joined the General Council of Trade Unions of Japan, and by 1958, it had 16,630 members, which fell to 12,564 in 1970. In 1975, it joined the new Japan Federation of National Public Service Employees' Unions, while retaining its separate identity. By 1990, it had 14,725 members.
