= National Council of Paper and Pulp Workers' Unions =

Trade union in Japan

The National Council of Paper and Pulp Workers' Unions (Japanese: 全日本紙パルプ紙加工産業労働組合総連合, Domei Kamipa Kyogikai) was a trade union representing workers in the paper making industry in Japan.

The union was established in 1973 and affiliated to the Japanese Confederation of Labour. In 1973, it had 9,926 members. In 1988, it merged with the National Federation of Paper and Pulp Industry Workers' Unions, the General Federation of Paper and Pulp Processing Workers' Unions, and the Paper and Pulp Industry Workers Unions Consultative Council, to form the Japanese Federation of Pulp and Paper Workers' Unions.
