= National Organization of All Chemical Workers =

Trade union in Japan

The National Organization of All Chemical Workers (Japanese: 全化学産業労働組合連合, Shin Kagaku) was a trade union representing workers in the chemical industry in Japan.

The union was founded in 1950, and soon after was a founding affiliate of the National Federation Of Industrial Organisations. By 1958 it had 7,049 members, growing to 12,265 members in 1970. From the late 1987, it was affiliated to the Japanese Trade Union Confederation, but by 1996, its membership had declined to 8,313. In 2002, it merged with the Japanese Federation of Chemistry Workers' Unions, the Japan Confederation of Petroleum Industry Workers' Unions, and the National Federation of Cement Workers' Unions of Japan, to form the Japan Federation of Energy and Chemistry Workers' Unions.
