= Japanese Federation of Construction Industry Workers =

Trade union in Japan

The Japanese Federation of Construction Industry Workers (Japanese: 建設産業労働組合同盟, KENSETSU DOMEI) was a trade union representing workers in the building industry in Japan.

The union was founded in 1978 and became affiliated with the Japanese Confederation of Labour. By 1985, it had 12,601 members. At the end of the decade, it moved to the Japanese Trade Union Confederation. In 1990, it merged with the Construction Ministry Workers' Unions, to form the Japan Construction Trade Union Confederation.
