= National Union of Coal Mine Workers =

Trade union in Japan

The National Union of Coal Mine Workers (Zentanko) was a trade union representing coal miners in Japan.

The union was founded in 1952, with the merger of a union which had split from the Japan Coal Miners' Union in 1949 with another dissident faction of that union. It was a founding affiliate of the Japanese Confederation of Labour, and by 1967, it had 31,799 members. It transferred to the Japanese Trade Union Confederation at the end of the 1980s, but lost members as the industry declined, and by 1996 was down to 1,750 members.
