= All Japan Federation of Ceramics Industry Workers =

Trade union in Japan

The All Japan Federation of Ceramics Industry Workers (JCW, Japanese: セラミックス産業労働組合連合会, Ceramics Rengo) is a trade union representing workers in the ceramics industry in Japan.

The union was founded on 12 December 1995, when the National Federation of Ceramic Industry Workers' Unions merged with several smaller unions. Like its largest predecessor, it has been affiliated with the Japanese Trade Union Confederation. On formation, it had 30,000 members, which by 2020 had fallen to 19,610.
