= National Federation of Food Industry Workers' Unions =

Trade union in Japan

The National Federation of Food Industry Workers' Unions (Japanese: 全国食品産業労働組合同盟, Zenshokuhin Domei) was a trade union representing workers in the food processing industry of Japan.

The union was founded in 1947 and affiliated to the Japanese Federation of Labour, then to the Japanese Confederation of Labour. By 1967, it had 24,272 members, and by 1990, it had grown to 38,913 members. By then, it was affiliated to the Japanese Trade Union Confederation. In 1995, it merged with the Japan Tobacco and Allied Workers' Union and the All Japan Federation of Food Industries Workers' Unions, to form the Japan Federation of Foods and Tobacco Workers' Unions.
