= All Japan Federation of Automobile Transport Workers' Unions =

Trade union in Japan

The All Japan Federation of Automobile Transport Workers' Unions (Japanese: 全国自動車交通労働組合総連合会, Jikosoren) is a trade union representing transport workers in Japan.

The union was established in 1978, and by 1980 it had 32,369 members. In 1989, it became affiliated with the new National Confederation of Trade Unions, and by 1990, its membership had grown to 37,465. However, by 2019, it had only 12,068 members.
