= National Federation Of Industrial Organisations =

Japanese national trade union federation

The National Federation Of Industrial Organisations (FIO, Japanese: 全国産業別労働組合連合, Shinsanbetsu) was a national trade union federation in Japan.

The federation was a split from Sanbetsu, which took place in 1952. Always a small organisation, by 1967 it had only three affiliates and a total of 69,839 members. By 1978, it had 61,000 members, and that year, it formed a loose association with the Federation of Independent Unions (Churitsuroren), intending to merge in the future. In 1987, it merged with both Churitsuroren and the larger Japanese Confederation of Labour, to form the Japanese Trade Union Confederation.

== Affiliates ==
The following unions were affiliated:

Union	Abbreviation	Founded	Left	Reason left	Membership (1958)	Membership (1970)	Membership (1985)
All National Railways Permanent Way and Construction Labor Union	Zenshiro	1971	1987		N/A	N/A	2,050
Japan Drivers' Union	Shinunten	1959	1987	Transferred to Rengo	N/A	4,200	5,194
Kyoto Workers' Federation	Kyotochiren				N/A	14,486	
National Federation of Construction Industry Workers' Unions	Zenkenro		1960	Merged into Zenkensoren	5,955	N/A	N/A
National Machinery and Metal Workers' Union	Zenkikin	1950	1987	Transferred to Rengo	19,822	33,283	30,250
National Organization of All Chemical Workers	Shinkagaku	1950	1987	Transferred to Rengo	7,049	12,265	11,433
