= All Construction Ministry Workers' Union =

Trade union in Japan

The All Construction Ministry Workers' Union (Japanese: 国土交通省全建設労働組合, Zenkenro) was a trade union representing workers at the Ministry of Construction in Japan.

The union was founded in 1949, and affiliated to the National Council of Government and Public Workers' Unions. It later also joined the General Council of Trade Unions of Japan, and by 1970, it had 12,564 members. In 1975, it joined the new Japan Federation of National Public Service Employees' Unions, while retaining its separate identity. By 1990, it had 10,681 members. On 11 September 2011, the union merged with the All Transportation Workers' Union, the All Weather Bureau Workers' Union, the Union of Employees of the Harbour Construction Board, and two small independent trade unions, to form the Labour Union of MLIT, JMA and Affiliates.
