= National Federation of Ceramic Industry Workers' Unions =

Trade union in Japan

The National Federation of Ceramic Industry Workers' Unions (Japanese: 全国窯業労働組合連合会, Zenyoren) was a trade union representing workers in the ceramic industry in Japan.

The union was established in 1949, and later affiliated to the Federation of Independent Unions. By 1970, it had 40,777 members. In 1989, it affiliated to the Japanese Trade Union Confederation. In 1995, it merged with several smaller unions to form the All Japan Federation of Ceramics Industry Workers.
