= Japan Construction Trade Union Confederation =

Trade union in Japan

The Japan Construction Trade Union Confederation (JCTUC; Japanese: 日本建設組合連合, Kensetsu Rengo) was a trade union representing workers in the building industry in Japan.

The union was founded in 1990, with the merger of the Japanese Federation of Construction Industry Workers and the Construction Ministry Workers' Unions. Like both of its predecessors, it was affiliated with the Japanese Trade Union Confederation. On formation, it had 14,091 members, while in 1996 its membership was 13,413. In 2014, it merged into the Japan Federation of Basic Industry Workers' Unions.
