= All Japan Postal Labour Union =

Trade union in Japan

- Formation: 1965
- Dissolved: 2007
- Merger of: Japan Postal Group Union
- Type: Trade Union
- Members: 84,000 members. (2007)
- Official language: Japanese

The All Japan Postal Labour Union (JPLU, Japanese: 全日本郵政労働組合, Zenyusei) was a trade union representing employees at Japan Post.

The union was established in 1965, as a more right-wing alternative to the Japan Postal Workers' Union (JPU). It was affiliated with the Japanese Confederation of Labour, and by 1967 had 29,426 members. In 1989, it became affiliated with the Japanese Trade Union Confederation, and also to the Postal, Telegraph and Telephone International.

By 2007, the union had 84,000 members. Inspired by the impending privatisation of Japan Post, it merged with the JPU on 1 October, to form the Japan Postal Group Union.
