= Japan Public Sector Union =

Trade union in Japan

The Japan Public Sector Union (JPSU; Japanese: 国公関連労働組合連合会, Kokko Rengo) is a trade union representing public sector workers in Japan.

== History ==
The union was established in October 2001, bringing together several affiliates, including the Japan Central Federation of National Public Service Employees' Unions (Kokko Soren). In 2011, Kokko Soren dissolved, and its own affiliates then became direct members of Kokko Rengo. Its largest current affiliates are:

- All Hokkaido Development Bureau Employees' Union
- All Japan Finance Bureau Labour Union
- All Japan Garrison Forces Labor Union
- Federation of Japanese Customs Personnel Labour Unions
- Japan Agriculture and Forestry Ministry Workers' Unions
- Japanese Confederation of National Tax Unions
- Labor Federation of Government Related Organizations
- Okinawa Public Service Workers' Union

Like all its predecessors, the union became affiliated with the Japanese Trade Union Confederation. In 2004, it created the National Public Union as a new affiliate, which accepts members from any area of the public sector not covered by its other affiliates. Its membership was 110,766 in 2009, but had fallen to 79,621 by 2020.
