= Japan Confederation of Petroleum Industry Workers' Unions =

Trade union in Japan

The Japan Confederation of Petroleum Industry Workers' Unions (Japanese: 全国石油産業労働組合連合会, Sekiyu Roren) was a trade union representing workers in the oil industry in Japan.

The union was founded on 11 April 1947 as a loose council and became a more centralised federation in 1953. It was initially known as the All Japan Oil Workers' Union (Zensekiyu). It was a founding affiliate of the Federation of Independent Unions (Churitsuroren), and by 1967, it had 24,611 members. In the late 1980s, it became affiliated with the Japanese Trade Union Confederation, and by 1996 it had 29,505 members. In 2002, it merged with the Japanese Federation of Chemistry Workers' Unions, the National Organization of All Chemical Workers, and the National Federation of Cement Workers' Unions of Japan to form the Japan Federation of Energy and Chemistry Workers' Unions.
