= Japan Metal Manufacturing, Information and Telecommunication Workers' Union =

Trade union in Japan

The Japan Metal Manufacturing, Information and Telecommunication Workers' Union (Japanese: 日本金属製造情報通信労働組合, JMITU) is a trade union representing workers in the engineering and telecommunications industries in Japan.

The union was founded on 31 January 2016, when the All Japan Metal and Machinery Information Workers' Union merged with the Telecommunication Workers' Union. Like both its predecessors, it was affiliated with the National Confederation of Trade Unions, and by 2019 it had 5,397 members.

== See also ==
- IBM and unions § Japan
