= Federation of Printing Information Media Workers' Unions =

Trade union in Japan

The Federation of Printing Information Media Workers' Unions (PIMW, Japanese: 印刷情報メディア産業労働組合連合会, Insatsu Roren) is a trade union representing workers in the printing industry in Japan.

The union was founded on 25 August 1989 and affiliated with the Japanese Trade Union Confederation. In 1996, it had 22,887 members, which by 2020 had fallen to 20,730.
