= National Federation of Cement Workers' Unions of Japan =

Trade union in Japan

The National Federation of Cement Workers' Unions of Japan (Japanese: 全国セメント労働組合連合会, Zenkoku Semento) was a trade union representing workers involved in manufacturing cement in Japan.

The union was founded in 1947, and was later a founding affiliate of the Federation of Independent Unions (Churitsuroren). By 1967, it had 26,855 members. In the late 1980s, it affiliated to the Japanese Trade Union Confederation, but by 1996 it had only 7,263 members remaining. In 2002, it merged with the Japanese Federation of Chemistry Workers' Unions, the National Organization of All Chemical Workers and the Japan Confederation of Petroleum Industry Workers' Unions, to form the Japan Federation of Energy and Chemistry Workers' Unions.
