= National Confederation of Beer Brewery Workers' Unions =

Trade union in Japan

The National Confederation of Beer Brewery Workers' Unions (Zenkoku Biiru) was a trade union representing workers in the brewing industry of Japan.

The union was founded in 1949, and later affiliated to the Federation of Independent Unions (Churitsuroren). By 1970, it had 15,046 members. In 1980, the union disaffiliated from Churitsuroren and became independent. By 1990, its membership stood at 13,395.
