= Japan Federation of Newspaper Workers' Unions =

Trade union in Japan

The Japan Federation of Newspaper Workers' Unions (Japanese: 日本新聞労働組合連合), better known by its Japanese abbreviation Shinbun Rōren, is a trade union representing newspaper journalists in Japan.

== History ==
Shinbun Rōren was founded on 30 June 1950. It was affiliated with the General Council of Trade Unions of Japan (Sōhyō), and by 1958 it had 27,056 members.. In 1960, Shinbun Rōren played an active role in the massive Anpo protests against renewal of the US-Japan Security Treaty, with journalists reporting on the protests as part of their job, and then joining the protests after they got off of work. By 1970, membership had grown to 38,057 and reached 41,961 by 1985.

In 1989, Sōhyō merged into the RENGO trade federation, but Shinbun Rōren decided instead to become independent. As of 2019, it had 21,876 members.
