= Japanese Metal Mine Workers' Union =

Trade union in Japan

The Japanese Metal Mine Workers' Union (Japanese: 非鉄連合, Hitetsu Rengo) was a trade union representing workers in the ore mining industry in Japan.

The union was founded in 1964 as the Federation of Japanese Metal Resource Workers' Unions (Shigenroren), and affiliated to Japanese Confederation of Labour the following year. By 1967, it had 13,411 members. It was affiliated to the Japanese Trade Union Confederation from the late 1980s, and by 1996 had 23,500 members.

On 9 September 2003, the union merged with the Japanese Federation of Iron and Steel Workers' Unions and the Japan Confederation of Shipbuilding and Engineering Workers' Unions, to form the Japan Federation of Basic Industry Workers' Unions.
