= Japanese Federation of Labour =

Japanese trade union federation (1946–1964)

Nihon Rōdō Kumiai Sōdōmei
- Japanese Federation of Labour
- 日本労働組合総同盟
- Predecessor: Sōdōmei
- Successor: Dōmei
- Formation: 1946
- Dissolved: 1964
- Type: Trade union federation
- Headquarters: Tokyo, Japan
- Members: 924,302 (1948)
- Affiliations: Japan Socialist Party

The Japanese Federation of Labour (日本労働組合総同盟, Nihon Rōdō Kumiai Sōdōmei), or Sōdōmei for short, was a national trade union federation in Japan during the early post-World War II era. Re-established in 1946 based on its pre-war predecessor founded in 1919, Sōdōmei represented the cooperative wing of the Japanese labor movement. In contrast to more radical federations, Sōdōmei's ideology was built on accepting the framework of a capitalist society and seeking to defend workers' interests through negotiation and partnership with management, a model that resembled the mainstream unionism of the United States. From its inception, it was dominated by the Japan Socialist Party.

Despite its cooperative philosophy, Sōdōmei was not passive and engaged in militant tactics when it deemed them necessary. It played a central role in the major labor conflicts and initiatives of the immediate post-war years, including the planned 1947 general strike and the creation of the Economic Recovery Council. With the support of the occupation authorities, it sponsored the creation of anti-communist Democratization Leagues (Mindo) to counter leftist influence in rival unions. Following the rise of the more confrontational Sōhyō federation in 1950, Sōdōmei became a leading force on the "right wing" of the labor movement, aligning with US-backed anti-communist initiatives like the Japan Productivity Center. The traditions and political alignment of Sōdōmei were later inherited by the Dōmei federation, and its cooperative principles, though initially a minority view, became foundational to the system of enterprise unionism that would dominate Japan in the following decades.

== History ==
=== Background and post-war revival ===
The original Sōdōmei was founded in 1919 and was the primary federation for trade unions in pre-war Japan. At its peak in 1936, it had fewer than 500,000 members out of an estimated national workforce of over 17 million. Like most independent unions, it was crushed during the wartime period, with all trade unions being officially abolished in 1940 and replaced by the government-controlled Industrial Patriotic Association (Sangyō Hōkokukai, or Sampo).

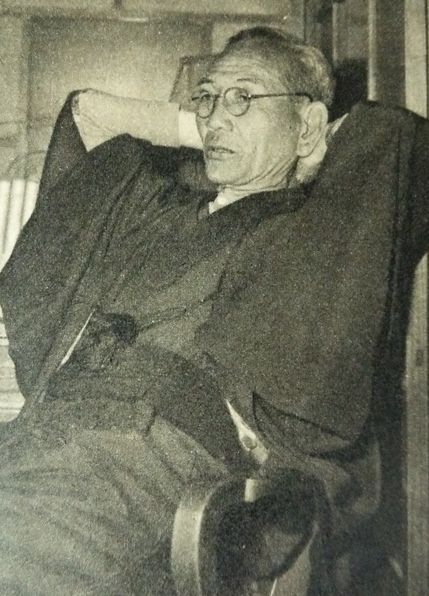
Komakichi Matsuoka

Following Japan's surrender in 1945 and the subsequent encouragement of unionization by the Allied occupation authorities, labor organizing revived rapidly. Veterans of the pre-war Sōdōmei were active in this process, with some, for instance, helping to establish new unions in Kawasaki by January 1946. The revived federation carried the cooperative message of its predecessor into the post-war era. From its post-war inception, Sōdōmei was dominated by the Japan Socialist Party. Its first president was Komakichi Matsuoka, a conservative pre-war labor leader who was also a Socialist Party member of the post-war Diet. Many other Sōdōmei officials were likewise active Socialist Party members.

=== Early post-war activism ===
By the end of 1948, the Sōdōmei had 924,302 members, making it the second-largest federation after the National Congress of Industrial Unions (Sanbetsu). The federation's backbone was the conservative Textile Workers' Union. Sōdōmei consistently rejected Sanbetsu's proposals for a merger.

In the spring of 1946, Sōdōmei advocated for a "Movement for Industrial Recovery to Overcome the Production Crisis," which proposed that unions should participate directly in corporate and national economic planning. This initiative was aimed at "democratizing industry" and achieving a "planned economy." Sōdōmei subsequently joined with the Keizai Dōyūkai, a new organization of reform-oriented capitalists, to form an Economic Recovery Council to pursue these goals.

Despite its cooperative platform, Sōdōmei joined with its rival Sanbetsu to plan a massive general strike scheduled for 1 February 1947. Amid popular anger over economic collapse, a Sanbetsu-Sōdōmei Joint Struggle Committee was formed to coordinate the action, which was expected to involve about 6 million public and private sector workers. However, at the last moment on January 31, General Douglas MacArthur ordered the strike to be called off. Realizing the rank and file would not defy the Supreme Commander, the organizers complied with the ban. The Economic Recovery Council, which had brought the two rival federations together, also collapsed after just over a year, as the two organizations were, in a popular idiom of the time, "sleeping together but dreaming separately."

Sōdōmei was also a key player in the anti-communist movement within the labor world. With the support of occupation authorities, it helped sponsor the creation of Democratization Leagues (Mindo) inside unions influenced by the Japan Communist Party. In February 1949, under Sōdōmei's leadership, these groups convened to form a new National Trade Union Congress (Zenkoku Rōdō Kumiai Kaigi) to intensify the anti-communist offensive in all unions and campaign for the Social Democratic Party.

=== Rivalry with Sōhyō and the 1950s ===
The landscape of the Japanese labor movement shifted significantly with the establishment of the General Council of Trade Unions of Japan (Sōhyō) in 1950. Sōhyō was initially founded with American encouragement as a non-communist alternative to Sanbetsu, but it soon adopted an aggressive platform of class-struggle unionism, supporting the left wing of the socialist party and militant workplace activism.

This development positioned Sōdōmei as a leading voice on the "right" of the labor movement, in opposition to the more powerful Sōhyō. In 1954, several industrial federations broke away from Sōhyō to form the new Zenrō federation, which shared Sōdōmei's cooperative stance. Throughout the 1950s, Sōdōmei and Zenrō allied with corporate leaders and the state. In 1955, Sōdōmei pledged its support for the Japan Productivity Center (JPC), a US-backed initiative to promote labor-management cooperation to increase industrial productivity, in exchange for promises that the resulting economic gains would be shared with workers. This alignment also attracted support from American diplomatic and labor officials, who cultivated ties with Sōdōmei and Zenrō leaders as part of a Cold War strategy to counter leftist influence in Japan. Despite this support, Sōdōmei and Zenrō remained a minority force; in 1955, they accounted for just 10 percent of organized workers in Japan, while Sōhyō represented about 50 percent. In 1964, Sōdōmei merged with Zenrō and the National Council of Government and Public Workers' Unions (Zenkankō) to form the Japanese Confederation of Labour (Dōmei).

== Ideology and political stance ==
Sōdōmei's core ideology was cooperative unionism, a position that set it apart from other major post-war labor federations. It accepted the basic framework of a capitalist society and saw its primary role as defending workers within that system. Sōdōmei's leaders argued that labor and management had a common interest in ensuring the viability of capitalism, even as they acknowledged that predictable differences between the two sides would arise. They believed these differences could normally be settled through good-faith bargaining.

However, Sōdōmei's cooperative stance did not preclude industrial action. The federation maintained that its tactics could be militant, even if its ultimate goals were not revolutionary. This approach was described as "cooperation backed by strength and a willingness to strike." A notable example occurred in October 1946, when the Sōdōmei-affiliated union at the Nippon Kokan Kawasaki steel mill, despite proclaiming its belief in the "mutual prosperity of labor and capital," launched a successful week-long strike. The action secured a contract giving the union a veto over management decisions related to transfers and dismissals, a significant gain in authority for the union.

== Presidents ==
- 1946–1952: Komakichi Matsuoka
- 1952–1959: Yonekichi Kim
- 1959–1964: Masashichi Motoi

== Affiliates ==
The following unions were affiliated in 1945:

Union	Abbreviation
National Textile Industry Labor Union Alliance	Zensendomei
National Metal Industry Labor Union Alliance	Zenkindomei
National Chemical Industry Labor Union Alliance	Kagakudomei
National Timber Industry Labor Union Alliance	
National Food Industry Trade Union Alliance	Zenkoku Shokuhin
National Armed Forces Labor Union Alliance	Zenchuro
Kanto Transport Labor Union Alliance	
Japan Mining Labor Union	Nikko
National Monopoly Bureau Labor Union	Zensenbai
Japan Medical Corps Staff Union General Union	
Japan Urban Transportation Labor Union Federation	Toshiko
National Printing Industry Labor Union Alliance	Zeninsatsu
National Federation of Labor Unions	Zenkokudoken

The following unions were later affiliates:

Abbreviation	Union	Founded	Left	Reason left	Membership (1958)
Zenka Domei	National Federation of Chemical Workers	1951	1964	Transferred to Domei	31,801
Zen Doken Domei	National Federation of Construction Workers' Unions				1,462
Zen Shokuhin Domei	National Federation of Food Industry Workers' Unions	1947	1964	Transferred to Domei	13,800
Kowan Jyunbikai	Preparatory Committee of National Federation of Harbour Workers' Unions			Transferred to Domei	1,916
Shin Mitsubishi Jyuko	Shin Mitsubishi Heavy Industry Workers' Union		1964	Transferred to Domei	22,314
Zenkin Domei	National Federation of Metal Industry Workers' Unions	1951	1964	Transferred to Domei	64,043
Zen Tanko	National Coal Mine Workers' Union	1952	1964	Transferred to Domei	44,604
Sodomei Ken Rengokai	Prefectural Associations of Sodomei				35,574
Zosen Soren	National Federation of Shipbuilding Workers' Unions	1951	1964	Transferred to Domei	28,462
Zen Koun Domei	National Federation of Transport Workers' Unions		1964	Merged into Kotsuroren	6,059

== Legacy ==
The social democratic tradition of Sōdōmei was carried on by the Dōmei federation, which emerged as a major national labor center. The cooperative unionism that Sōdōmei had championed in the early post-war years, though initially a minority position, eventually became the dominant model for labor-management relations in Japan. However, the form of "ultra-cooperative" unionism that became hegemonic from the 1960s onward was more extreme in its cooperation with management than the Sōdōmei model, which had always retained a willingness to engage in militant struggle as a last resort.

== Works cited ==
- Gordon, Andrew (1998). The Wages of Affluence: Labor and Management in Postwar Japan. Cambridge, Massachusetts: Harvard University Press. ISBN 0-674-80577-1.
- Moran, William T. (19 October 1949). "Labor Unions in Postwar Japan". Far Eastern Survey. 18 (21). Institute of Pacific Relations: 241–248. doi:10.2307/3024155. JSTOR 3024155.
