= Japan Postal Group Union =

Trade union in Japan

- Formation: 2007
- Type: Trade union
- Members: 243,754 (2020)
- Website: www.jprouso.or.jp/system/servlet/yusei.UserTop

The Japan Postal Group Union (JPGU, Japanese: 日本郵政グループ労働組合) is a trade union representing employees of Japan Post Holdings.

The union was founded on 1 October 2007, with the merger of the Japan Postal Workers' Union and the All Japan Postal Labor Union, inspired by the privatisation of Japan Post. Like both its predecessors, it became affiliated with the Japanese Trade Union Confederation. It grew from 216,186 members in 2009, to 243,754 in 2020.
