= All Japan Federation of Transport Workers' Unions =

Trade union in Japan

The All Japan Federation of Transport Workers' Unions (Japanese: 全日本運輸産業労働組合連合会, Unyu Roren) is a trade union representing workers in the distribution sector, particularly in road goods transportation, in Japan.

The union was established in 1968, and remained independent until 1989, when it joined the new Japanese Trade Union Confederation. By that point, it had 118,000 members and was one of the 20 largest unions in the country. By 2020, it had grown to 128,095 members.
