= All Monopoly Corporation Workers' Union =

Trade union in Japan

The All Monopoly Corporation Workers' Union (Zensenbai) was a trade union representing workers in the tobacco and salt industries in Japan.

The union was founded in 1949, and was a founding affiliate of the General Council of Trade Unions of Japan. By 1967, it had 39,426 members. In 1985, the tobacco industry was privatised, leading the tobacco section of the union to split away as the Japan Tobacco and Allied Workers' Union. The union dissolved in 1987.
