= JAM (trade union) =

Trade union in Japan

JAM is a trade union representing manufacturing workers in Japan.

The union was founded on 9 September 1999, when the Japanese Metal Industrial Workers' Union merged with the National Metal and Machinery Workers' Union. Like both its predecessors, it affiliated to RENGO. The union initially represented about 500,000 members, in 2,200 local or company unions. Its name is derived from an English language description, the Japanese Association of Metal, Machinery and Manufacturing Workers.
