= Japan Confederation of Shipbuilding and Engineering Workers' Unions =

Trade union in Japan

The Japan Confederation of Shipbuilding and Engineering Workers' Unions (Japanese: 造船重機労連, Zosenjukiroren) was a trade union representing workers in manufacturing industries in Japan.

The union was founded in 1972 on the initiative of the General Federation of Ship Building Workers' Unions. The union initially included 74 company unions, and it affiliated to the Japanese Confederation of Labour. By 1987, the union had 127,000 members. That year, it joined the new Japanese Trade Union Confederation.

In 2003, the union merged with the Japanese Federation of Iron and Steel Workers' Unions and the Japanese Metal Mine Workers' Union, to form the Japan Federation of Basic Industry Workers' Unions.
