= All-Japan Prefectural and Municipal Workers' Union =

Trade union in Japan

The All-Japan Prefectural and Municipal Workers' Union (Japanese: 全日本自治団体労働組合, Jichiro) is a trade union representing local government workers in Japan.

The union was established in January 1954, with the merger of two smaller unions of local government workers. It was affiliated with the General Council of Trade Unions of Japan and grew rapidly, attaining 559,397 members by 1967. By 1987, it was the largest union in the country, with 1,257,000 members. In 1989, it became affiliated with the Japanese Trade Union Confederation. Members who objected to this affiliation left and formed the rival Japan Federation of Prefectural and Municipal Workers' Unions.

The union absorbed the National Union of General Workers in 2006 and the All Japan Municipal Transport Workers' Union in 2013. Despite this, by 2020, its membership had declined to 785,445, though it was still Japan's second-largest union.
