= Japan Coal Miners' Union =

Trade union in Japan

The Japan Coal Miners' Union (Japanese: 日本炭鉱労働組合, Tanro), was a trade union representing coal miners in Japan.

The union was established in 1950, initially with about 290,000 members. It affiliated to the General Council of Trade Unions of Japan, and later to its successor, RENGO. It was perhaps the most powerful union in Japan during the 1950s. In 2002, the last coal mine in Japan closed, and this led the union to dissolve in November 2004.
