= Japan Federation of Energy and Chemistry Workers' Unions =

Trade union in Japan

The Japan Federation of Energy and Chemistry Workers' Unions (Japanese: 日本化学エネルギー産業労働組合連合会, JEC RENGO) is a trade union representing workers in various related industries in Japan.

The union was founded in October 2002, with the merger of the Japanese Federation of Chemistry Workers' Unions, the National Organization of All Chemical Workers, the Japan Confederation of Petroleum Industry Workers' Unions, and the National Federation of Cement Workers' Unions of Japan. Like all of its predecessors, it has been affiliated with the Japanese Trade Union Confederation. In 2009, it had 158,958 members, but by 2020 this had fallen to 104,038.
