= Labor Ministry Workers' Union =

Trade union in Japan

The Labor Ministry Workers' Union (Japanese: 全労働省労働組合, Zenrodo) is a trade union representing workers at the Japanese Ministry of Health, Labour and Welfare.

The union was founded in 1949, and it affiliated to the General Council of Trade Unions of Japan. By 1958, it had 13,255 members, growing to 19,732 in 1970. In 1975, it merged into the Japan Federation of National Public Service Employees' Unions, while retaining its own identity. By 1990, it had 19,605 members.
