= National Tax Collectors' Union =

Trade union in Japan

The National Tax Collectors' Union (Japanese: 全国税労働組合, Zenkokuzei) is a trade union representing tax agency workers in Japan.

The union was established in 1946, and affiliated to the General Council of Trade Unions of Japan. By 1958, it had 31,986 members, but that year, it suffered a major split, as the right wing of the union left to form the Japanese Confederation of National Tax Unions. By 1970, it was down to only 3,209 members, and in 1975 it merged into the Japan Federation of National Public Service Employees' Unions, while retaining its own identity. By 1990, its membership had fallen further, to just 1,309.
