= National Metal and Machinery Workers' Union =

Trade union in Japan

The National Metal and Machinery Workers' Union (MMU, Japanese: 全国金属機械労働組合, Kinzokukikai) was a trade union representing workers in small and medium-sized engineering works in Japan.

The union was founded in 1989, when the National Trade Union of Metal and Engineering Workers merged with the National Machinery and Metal Workers' Union. It affiliated to the Japanese Trade Union Confederation. On 9 September 1999, it merged with the Japanese Metal Industrial Workers' Union to form JAM.
