= Japan Postal Workers' Union =

Trade union in Japan

- Formation: 1946
- Dissolved: 2007
- Location: Japan

The Japan Postal Workers' Union (JPU, Japanese: 日本郵政公社労働組合, Zentei) was a trade union representing workers at Japan Post.

The union was founded in 1946 and soon became affiliated with the General Council of Trade Unions of Japan (Sōhyō). One of the first major unions founded in the country after World War II, it was also considered one of the most influential unions in the post-war period. By 1967, it had 245,302 members. In 1990, Sōhyō merged into the Japanese Trade Union Confederation, with which the JPU then became affiliated.

On 1 October 2007, inspired by the planned privatization of Japan Post, it merged with the All Japan Postal Labor Union, to form the Japan Postal Group Union.
