= All Printing Bureau Labour Union =

Trade union in Japan

The All Printing Bureau Labour Union (PLU, Japanese: 全印刷局労働組合, Zen Insatsu) is a trade union representing workers in the printing industry in Japan.

The union was founded on 1 April 1947, with the merger of several recently founded company unions. It was later affiliated with the General Council of Trade Unions of Japan, and by 1958 it had 7,340 members, all working at what became the National Printing Bureau. By the late 1980s, it became affiliated with the Japanese Trade Union Confederation, but by 2020 its membership had fallen to 4,060.
