= Japanese Federation of Iron and Steel Workers' Unions =

Trade union in Japan

The Japanese Federation of Iron and Steel Workers' Unions (Japanese: 鉄鋼労連造船重機労連非鉄連合, Tekkororen) was a trade union representing workers in the iron and steel industries in Japan.

The union was established in 1951, with the merger of unions representing workers at Yahata Steel Works, NKK, Fuji Iron & Steel, Sumitomo Metal Industries, and Kobe Steel. In 1952, the union became affiliated with the General Council of Trade Unions of Japan (Sohyo), and by 1967, it had 192,956 members.

The union rapidly centralized, and it undertook frequent strikes during the 1950s, which led to wage increases, and by 1960, iron and steel workers were the highest-paid industrial workers in the country. It struck deals to regulate pay throughout the 1960s, but by the end of the decade, the industry was seeing widespread job losses, with which the union generally co-operated. The union was later a founding constituent of Rengo, and by 1996 still had 193,472 members.

In 2003, the union merged with the Japan Confederation of Shipbuilding and Engineering Workers' Unions and the Japanese Metal Mine Workers' Union, to form the Japan Federation of Basic Industry Workers' Unions.
