= All Japan Water Supply Workers' Union =

Trade union in Japan

The All-Japan Water Supply Workers' Union (Japanese: 全日本水道労働組合, Zensuido) is a trade union representing workers in the water industry in Japan.

The union was founded in 1951 by municipal workers involved in water supply and sewerage. The union affiliated to the General Council of Trade Unions of Japan, and by 1967, it had 31,699 members. It has been affiliated to the Japanese Trade Union Confederation since the late 1980s. By 2020, its membership had fallen to 16,281.
