= Food Industry Workers' Unions Council =

Trade union in Japan

The Food Industry Workers' Unions Council (Shokuhin Rokyo) was a trade union representing workers in the food processing industry of Japan.

The union was founded in 1989, and affiliated with the Japanese Trade Union Confederation the following year. It had 13,600 members on formation, which by 1996 had increased to 21,826. In 2000, it merged with the Japan Federation of Foods and Tobacco Workers' Unions, to form the Japan Federation of Foods and Tobacco Workers' Unions.
