= National Federation of Life Insurance Workers' Unions =

Trade union in Japan

The National Federation of Life Insurance Workers' Unions (Japanese: 全国生命保険労働組合連合会, Seiho Roren) is a trade union representing workers in the life insurance industry in Japan.

The union was founded in 1969, when the National Federation of Life Insurance Brokers' Unions merged with the National Federation of Life Insurance Salesmen's Unions, reflecting the merger of many company unions for brokers and salespeople. In 1987, it affiliated to the new Japanese Trade Union Confederation, and by the following year, it had 406,000 members. As of 2020, its membership had fallen to 233,614.
