= Japan Federation of Media, Advertising, Motion Picture, and Theater Labor Unions =

Trade union in Japan

The Japan Federation of Media, Advertising, Motion Picture, and Theater Labor Unions (Japanese: メディア・広告・映画演劇労働組合連合会, MEDIA ROREN) is a trade union representing workers in the media, advertising and entertainment industries in Japan.

The union was founded in October 2017, with the merger of the Federation of All-NHK Labour Unions, and the National Cinema and Theater Workers' Union. Like both its predecessors, it affiliated to the Japanese Trade Union Confederation. By 2020, it had 9,577 members.
