= Japanese Confederation of Labour =

Japanese national trade union federation

The Japanese Confederation of Labour (Dōmei; Japanese: 全日本労働総同盟) was a national trade union federation in Japan.

The federation was founded in 1964, with the merger of the All-Japan Trade Union Congress, the National Council of Government and Public Workers' Unions, and the Japanese Federation of Labour. By 1967, it had 23 affiliates, and was the largest trade union federation in the country, just ahead of General Council of Trade Unions of Japan. Like its rival, it sponsored candidates for the National Diet, closely linked to the Democratic Socialist Party.

In 1987, the federation merged with the Federation of Independent Unions, and the National Federation Of Industrial Organisations, to form the Japanese Trade Union Confederation.

== Affiliates ==
In 1967, the following unions were affiliated:

Name	Abbreviation	Founded	Left	Reason not affiliated	Membership (1967)	Membership (1985)
All-Japan Seamen's Union	Kaiin	1945	1987	Transferred to RENGO	142,935	130,991
All Japan Postal Labour Union	Zenyusei	1965	1987	Transferred to RENGO	29,426	65,381
Council of Oil Industry Workers Unions	Sekiyudomei	1978	1987	Merged into Sekiyuroren	N/A	3,630
Federation of Electrical Workers' Unions of Japan	Denroren	1954	1987	Transferred to RENGO	128,939	134,284
Federation of Japan Automobile Workers' Unions	Jidosharoren	1955	1987	Transferred to RENGO	118,174	221,641
Federation of Japanese Customs Personnel Labour Unions	Zeikanroren	1965	1987	Transferred to RENGO	5,652	5,193
Federation of Japanese Metal Resource Workers' Unions	Shigenroren	1965	1987	Transferred to RENGO	13,411	8,037
General Federation of Ship Building Workers' Unions	Zosensoren	1951	1972	Merged into Zosenjukiroren	58,344	N/A
Inland Revenue Employees' Union	Kokuzeiroso	1958	1987	Transferred to RENGO	10,275	
Japanese Confederation of Aviation Labour	Kokudomei	1974	1987	Transferred to RENGO	N/A	16,377
Japan Confederation of Shipbuilding and Engineering Workers' Unions	Zosenjukiroren	1972	1987	Transferred to RENGO	N/A	165,779
Japanese Federation of Chemical and General Workers' Unions	Zenkadomei	1951	1987	Transferred to RENGO	88,233	104,740
Japanese Federation of Construction Industry Workers	Kensetsudomei	1978	1987	Transferred to RENGO	N/A	12,601
Japan Federation of Dockworkers' Unions	Nihonkowan	1971	1987	Transferred to RENGO	N/A	3,617
Japanese Federation of National Railway Workers' Unions	Shinkokuro	1962	1968	Merged into Tetsuro	74,755	N/A
Japanese Federation of Textile Workers' Unions	Zensendomei	1946	1987	Transferred to RENGO	505,461	492,827
Japan Federation of Transport Workers' Unions	Kotsuroren	1964	1987	Transferred to RENGO	75,786	109,790
Japanese Metal Industrial Workers' Union	Zenkindomei	1951	1987	Transferred to RENGO	220,044	287,349
Japan Railway Workers' Union	Tetsuro	1968	1987	Merged into JR-Soren	N/A	31,814
Mitsubishi Heavy Industries Workers' Unions	Domei-Mitsubishikyogikai		1987	Transferred to RENGO	40,158	23,373
National Council of Paper and Pulp Workers' Unions	Domei Kamipa Kyogikai	1973	1987	Transferred to RENGO	N/A	
National Democratic Union of Casual Workers	Zenminro	1955	1987		15,973	5,428
National Federation of Food Industry Workers' Unions	Zenshokuhindomei	1947	1987	Transferred to RENGO	24,272	41,125
National Federation of General Workers' Unions	Ippandomei	1966	1987	Transferred to RENGO	84,617	116,964
National Federation of Prefectural Municipal Workers' Unions	Jichiroren	1970	1987	Transferred to RENGO	4,394	7,225
National Forestry Workers' Union of Japan	Nichirinro	1965	1987	Transferred to RENGO	10,252	7,693
National Movie and Theater Workers' Union	Zeneien	1947	1987	Transferred to RENGO	3,220	929
National Union of Coal Mine Workers	Zentanko	1954	1987	Transferred to RENGO	31,799	4,993
New Japan Teachers' Union	Shinkyoso	1968			N/A	4,611
Social Insurance Fee Payment Fund Labour Union	Kikinroso	1964	1987	Transferred to RENGO	3,906	5,374
Statistics Labor Union-management and Coordination Agency	Tokeiroso	1962	1987	Transferred to RENGO	1,700	1,017

== Presidents ==
1964: Yutaka Nabasama
1968: Minoru Takita
1972: Seiji Amaike
1980: Tadanobu Usami
