= Zenroren =

Japanese national trade union center

National Confederation of Trade Unions
- National Confederation of Trade Unions
- 全労連
- Founded: November 21, 1989
- Headquarters: 4F, 2-4-4, Yushima, Bunkyo, Tokyo
- Location: Japan
- Members: 1.2 million
- Website: www.zenroren.gr.jp/jp/index.html

The National Confederation of Trade Unions (全国労働組合総連合, Zenkoku Rōdōkumiai sōrengō), commonly known in Japanese as Zenroren (全労連), is a national trade union center.

== Founding and history ==
Zenroren was founded on November 21, 1989.

== Party affiliation ==
Zenroren is not affiliated to any political party, but is generally aligned with the Japan Communist Party.

== Affiliated unions ==
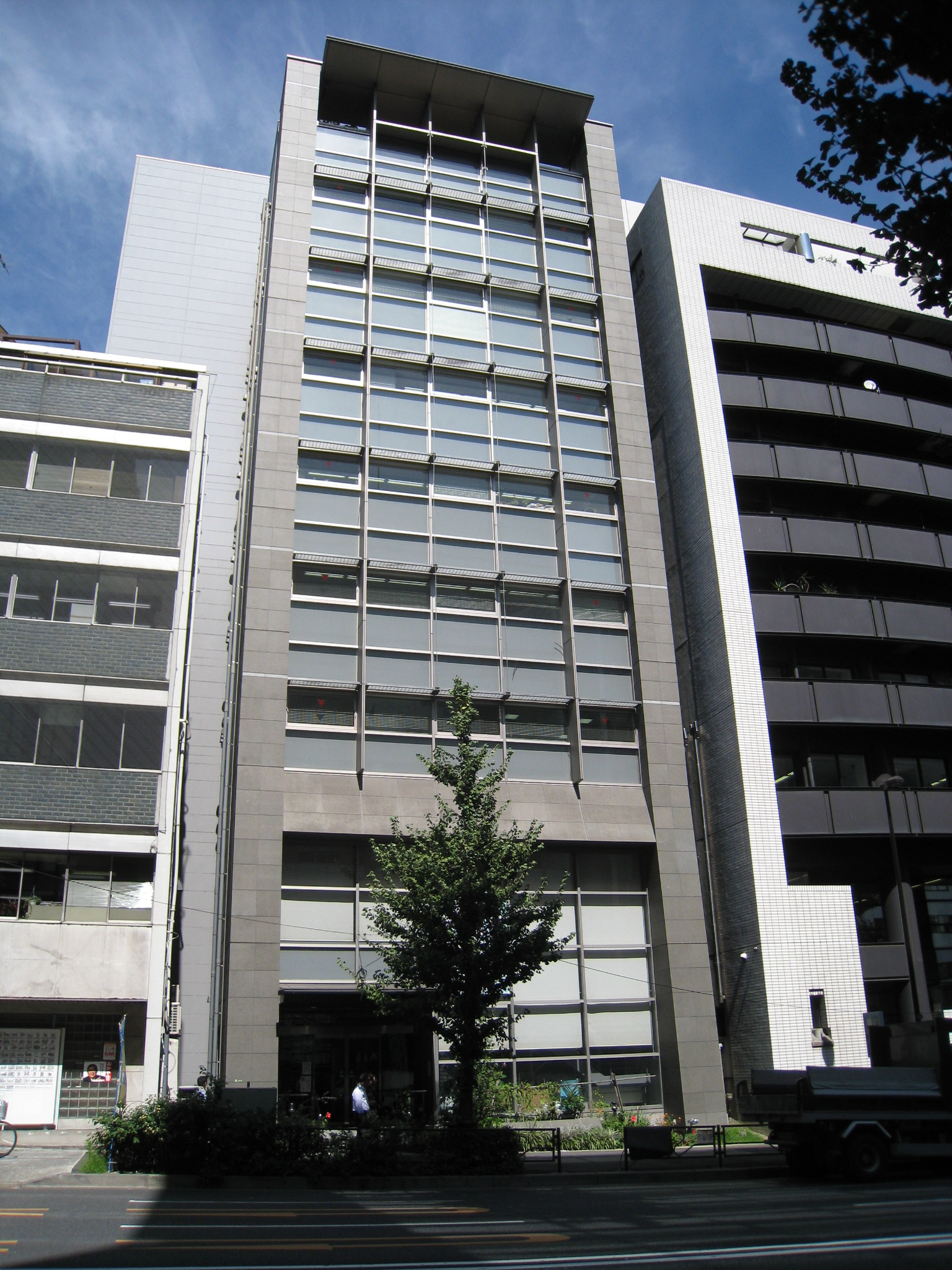
Zenroren headquarters in Yushima, Bunkyo Ward, Tokyo

=== Current affiliates ===
The following unions are affiliated:

Union	Abbreviation	Founded	Membership (2019)
All Japan Construction, Transport and General Workers' Union	Kenkoro	1999	19,578
All Japan Federation of Automobile Transport Workers' Unions	Jikosoren	1978	12,068
All Japan Federation of Teachers' and Staff Unions	Zenkyo	1991	63,349
All Japan Pensioners' Union	Nenkinsha-kumia	1989	
Film and Allied Industry Workers' Unions	Eisanro		
General Federation of Cinema and Theatrical Workers' Unions of Japan	Eiensoren	1952	1,275
General Federation of Japan Printing and Publishing Workers' Unions	Zeninsoren	1953	3,286
Japan Federation of Commercial Broadcasting Workers' Unions	Minpororen	1953	
Japan Federation of Medical Workers' Unions	Nihoniroren	1957	154,379
Japan Federation of National Public Service Employees' Unions	Kokkororen	1975	60,454
Japan Federation of Prefectural and Municipal Workers' Unions	Jichiroren	1989	138,655
Japan Metal Manufacturing, Information and Telecommunication Workers' Union	JMITU	2016	5,397
Liaison Council of Labor Unions in Public Corporations	Tokushuhojin-roren		992
National Federation of Consumers' Cooperatives Workers' Unions	Seikyororen	1968	63,135
National Federation of Finance Workers' Unions	Kinyuroren	2006	3,921
National Federation of Ship Cargo Checkers' Unions	Kensuroren		1,042
National Union of Welfare and Childcare Workers	Fukushi-hoikuro		10,920
Postal Industry Workers' Union	Yusanro	2012	2,466
Textile and Clothing Industries Workers' Union	Seni-sanro		216
Zenroren National Union of General Workers	Zenroren Zenkoku-ippan	1989	22,052

There are also prefectural Federations in all 47 prefectures of Japan.

=== Former affiliates ===
Union	Abbreviation	Founded	Left	Reason not affiliated	Membership (1990)
All Japan Metal and Machinery Information Workers' Union	JMIU	1989	2016	Merged into JMITU	11,098
All Japan National Railway Locomotive Engineers' Union	Zendoro	1974	1999	Merged into Kenkoro	1,401
All Japan Transport and General Workers' Union	Unyuippan	1946	1999	Merged into Kenkoro	16,176
Construction and Rural and General Workers' Union	Zennichijiro	1947	1999	Merged into Kenkoro	38,495
Federation of Rolling Stock Industry Workers' Unions	Sharyorokyo	1972			10,000
National Federation of Agricultural Mutual Aid Societies Employees' Unions	Zennokyororen	1956	1991	Merged into Zennichijiro	68,423
National Federation of Credit Association Workers' Unions	Zenshinro	1954	2006	Merged into Kinyuroren	13,098
National Federation of Local Bank Employees' Unions	Chiginren	1956	2006	Merged into Kinyuroren	471
Telecommunication Workers' Union	Tsushinroso	1989	2016	Merged into JMITU	1,086

== Leadership ==
=== General Secretaries ===
1989: Kanemichi Kumagai
1998: Mitsuo Bannai
2006: Sakuji Daikoku
Hisashi Inoue
2017: Yukihiro Nomura
2020: Kurosawa Koichi

=== Presidents ===
1989: Matsumoto Michihiro
Takeshi Ooe
Mitsuru Mikami
Kanemichi Kumagai
Kobayashi Yoji
2006: Mitsuo Bannai
2008: Yoshikazu Odagawa
2020: Obata Masako

== See also ==
- Labor unions in Japan
