= Japanese Federation of Synthetic Chemistry Workers' Unions =

Trade union in Japan

- Type: Trade union

The Japanese Federation of Synthetic Chemistry Workers' Unions (Japanese: 合成化学産業労働組合連合, Gokaroren) was a trade union representing workers in the chemical industry in Japan.

The union was founded in 1950, with the merger of two unions representing ammonium sulfate and phosphate workers. The same year, it was a founding affiliate of the General Council of Trade Unions of Japan (Sohyo). From 1953 until 1957, it was chaired by Ōta Kaoru. By 1967, it had 121,324 members.

The union was affiliated with the Japanese Trade Union Confederation from the late 1980s, and by 1996, it had 91,242 members. The All Japan Chemistry Workers' Union split away in 1987, but merged with Goka Roren in 1998 to form the Japanese Federation of Chemistry Workers' Unions.
