= National Federation of General Workers' Unions =

Trade union in Japan

The National Federation of General Workers' Unions (Japanese: 全国一般労働組合同盟, Ippan Domei) was a general union representing workers in Japan.

The union was established in 1966, and affiliated to the Japanese Confederation of Labour. By 1967, it had 84,617 members. It was a later a founding affiliate of the Japanese Trade Union Confederation. In 1995, it merged with the Japanese Federation of Chemical and General Workers' Unions to form the Japanese Federation of Chemical, Service and General Trade Unions.
