= Sōhyō =

Former Japanese union confederation

On 11 July 1950, the founding convention of the General Council of Trade Unions of Japan (Sōhyō) was held at the Tōkō Kaikan in Minato, Tokyo. Socialist politician Inejirō Asanuma delivers a speech.

The General Council of Trade Unions of Japan (日本労働組合総評議会, Nihon Rōdōkumiai Sōhyōgikai), often abbreviated to Sōhyō (総評), was a left-leaning union confederation. Founded in 1950, it was the largest labor federation in Japan for several decades. It merged with other Japanese labor federations to form RENGO in 1989.

== Origins ==
In the immediate aftermath of Japan's defeat in World War II, the United States-led Allied Occupation of Japan issued directives legalizing labor unions, which were then protected by the new Constitution of Japan promulgated in 1947. In the early postwar years, numerous labor unions formed in industries throughout Japan, many of which were under the influence of the Japan Communist Party. However, in 1950, following the advent of the global Cold War, and taking advantage of the sense of crisis precipitated by the sudden outbreak of the Korean War, conservative Japanese government and business leaders launched, with the tacit approval of US Occupation authorities, a "Red Purge" to remove communists and suspected communists from government and private-sector jobs. As part of the purge, Japanese conservatives fomented "democracy cells" within the established, Communist Party-dominated labor unions. As these unions collapsed amid the purge, the cells emerged and joined with some affiliates of the Japanese Federation of Labour to form a new labor federation, the General Council of Trade Unions of Japan, or Sōhyō.

== Early militancy ==
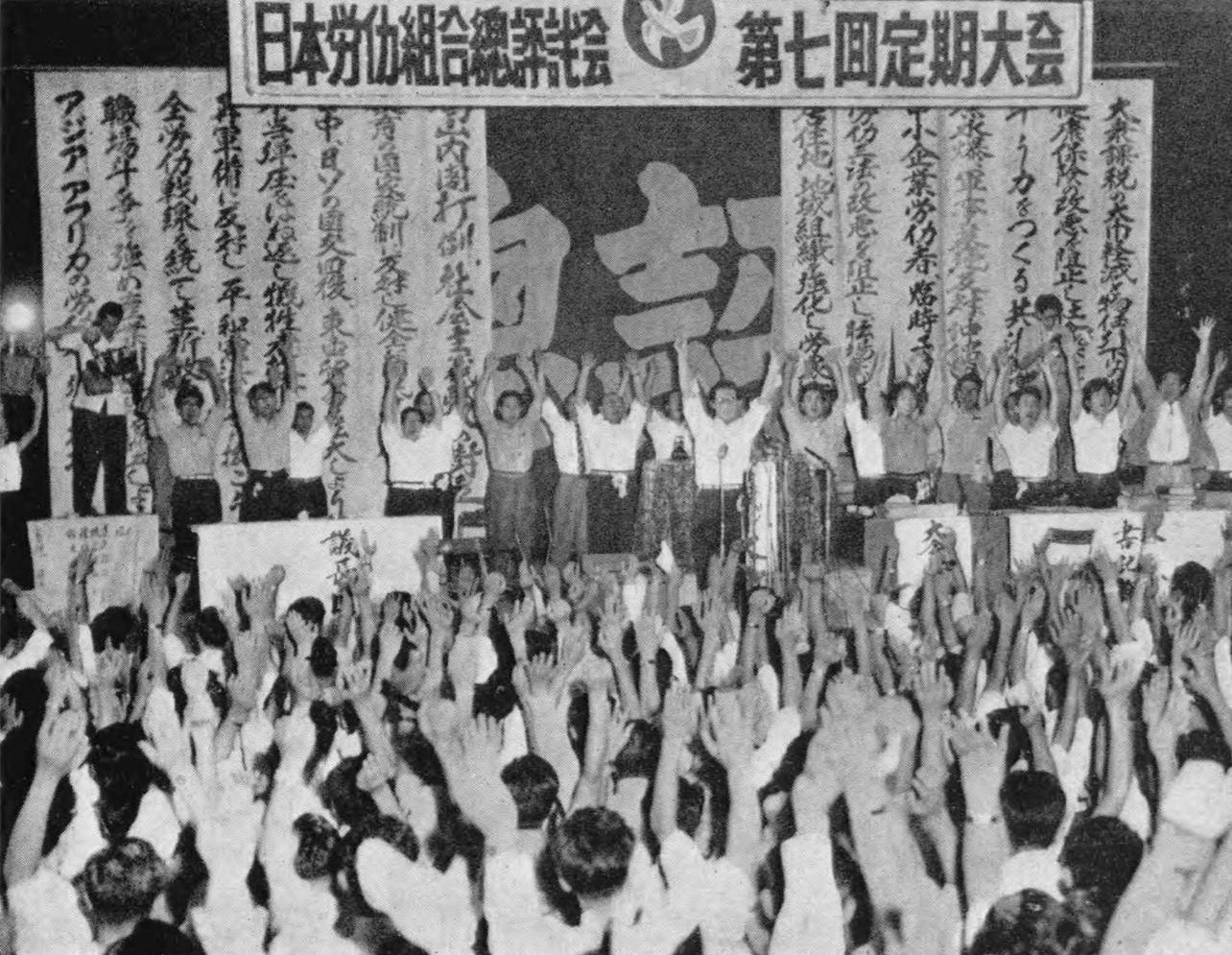
Sōhyō's 7th National Convention, 1956

Conservatives hoped that the new federation would be more moderate than the federations controlled by the Communist Party, which had been extremely militant. However, Sōhyō rapidly fell under the sway of the Japan Socialist Party and took the lead in organizing an escalating series of increasingly large and contentious labor actions over the course of the 1950s, and increasingly became involved in political protests as well.

On May 1, 1952, Sōhyō spearheaded a nationwide day of protest against the perceived one-sided nature of the Peace Treaty ending the Occupation of Japan. Although most of these activities were peaceful, a violent clash between protesters and police outside the Imperial Palace in Tokyo led to several deaths and injuries and became remembered as "Bloody May Day."

Over the rest of the 1950s, Sōhyō became actively involved in a number of political and social movements, including movements to ban nuclear weapons and against US military bases in Japan. It also led a large number of strikes for higher wages across many different industries. Sōhyō's period of militancy culminated in 1960 when it took a leading role in the massive Anpo protests against revision of the US Japan Security Treaty, as well as the large-scale strike at the Miike Coal Mine in northern Kyushu. As part of the anti-Security Treaty Struggle, Sōhyō organized a nationwide general strike that involved 6.4 million workers and remains the largest recorded strike in Japanese history. However, both these efforts ended in disastrous defeats, and thereafter Sōhyō increasingly retreated from contentious strikes in favor of more moderate workplace actions.

== Merger to form Rengo ==
A large portion of Sōhyō merged with the more conservative Japanese Confederation of Labor (Domei) and other unions to form Rengo in 1987. Rengo was formally launched in 1989. Some elements of Sōhyō instead joined one of two new federations: the National Confederation of Trade Unions (Zenroren), and the National Trade Union Council (Zenrokyo).

== Affiliates ==
The following unions were affiliated:

Union	Abbreviation	Founded	Left	Reason not affiliated	Membership (1958)	Membership (1970)	Membership (1985)
Alcohol Monopoly Workers' Union	Arukorusenbai	1952			1,278	1,056	443
All Finance Bureau Labour Union	Zenzaimu	1954	1975	Merged into Kokkororen	N/A	5,339	N/A
All Hokkaido Development Bureau Employees' Union	Zenkaihatsu	1951	1975	Merged into Kokkororen	N/A	11,050	N/A
All International Trade and Industry Ministry Workers' Union	Zenshoko	1946	1975	Merged into Kokkororen	8,803	10,791	N/A
All Japan Construction Industry Workers' Union		1971	1989	Disaffiliated	N/A	N/A	3,000
All Japan Day Workers' Union	Zennichijiro	1947	1989	Transferred to Zenroren	150,339	153,068	67,386
All-Japan Express Workers' Union	Zennitsu	1946	1968	Merged into Unyuroren	67,920	69,489	N/A
All Japan Federation of Hotel Workers' Unions	Hoteruroren	1948	1989	Transferred to Rengo	N/A	N/A	12,383
All Japan Federation of Metal Miners' Unions	Zenko	1947	1982	Merged into Hitetsukinzokuroren	57,000	31,984	N/A
All-Japan Federation of Municipal Traffic Workers' Unions	Toshikotsu	1947	1989	Transferred to Rengo	46,601	66,237	48,028
All Japan Federation of Non-Ferrous Metal Workers' Unions	Hitetsukinzokuroren	1982	1989	Transferred to Rengo	N/A	N/A	16,477
All Japan Federation of Water Transport Workers' Unions	Zenkairen	1947	1989	Transferred to Rengo	4,931	8,505	7,949
All Japan Garrison Forces Labour Union	Zenchuro	1946	1989	Transferred to Rengo	81,753	25,320	
All Japan Glass and Bottle Makers' Union	Zenshoro		1972	Merged into Kagakudomei	N/A	9,668	N/A
All Japan Harbour Workers' Union	Zenkowan	1946	1989	Disaffiliated	20,261	28,214	22,124
All Japan National Hospital Workers' Union	Zeniro	1948	1957	Merged into Irokyo	24,159	N/A	N/A
All-Japan Prefectural and Municipal Workers' Union	Jichiro	1954	1989	Transferred to Sohyo	437,931	836,090	1,267,021
All-Japan Telecommunication Workers' Union	Zendentsu	1950	1989	Transferred to Sohyo	152,039	232,519	276,686
All Japan Transport and General Workers' Union	Unyuippan	1950	1989	Transferred to Zenroren	12,655	14,409	16,267
All Judiciary Administration Employees' Union	Zenshiho	1947	1975	Merged into Kokkororen	16,630	12,564	N/A
All Kyushu Electric Power Workers' Union	Zenkyuden				N/A	3,212	
All Labour Ministry Workers' Union	Zenrodo	1949	1975	Merged into Kokkororen	13,255	19,732	N/A
All Minting Bureau Workers' Union	Zenzohei	1946	1989	Transferred to Rengo	1,597	1,790	1,444
All Monopoly Corporation Workers' Union	Zensenbai	1949	1987	Dissolved	39,729	37,938	30,219
All Radio Wave Control Agency Workers' Union	Zendempa	1951	1975	Merged into Kokkororen	2,800	2,456	N/A
All Transportation Workers' Union	Zenunyu	1962	1975	Merged into Kokkororen	N/A	5,790	N/A
Audit Board Employees' Union	Kaikenro	1946	1989	Disaffiliated	N/A	1,120	1,055
Construction Ministry Workers' Union	Zenkenro	1949	1975	Merged into Kokkororen	N/A	12,564	N/A
Council of Special Governmental Corporations Workers' Unions	Seirokyo	1960	1989	Transferred to Rengo	N/A	10,161	21,479
Education Ministry Employees' Union	Monbushokuso		1975	Merged into Kokkororen	1,635	1,914	N/A
Finance Ministry Employees' Union	Okurashokuso				1,800	1,985	
General Federation of Private Railway Workers' Unions of Japan	Shitetsusroren	1947	1989	Transferred to Rengo	134,374	253,259	197,045
Government Printing Bureau Workers' Union	Zeninsatsu	1947	1989	Transferred to Rengo	7,340	7,499	6,215
International Telecommunications Corporation Workers' Union	Kokusai Den-Den	1953			3,063	3,212	4,637
Japan Agriculture and Forestry Ministry Workers' Unions	Zennorin	1958	1975	Merged into Kokkororen	106,000	50,613	N/A
Japan Broadcasting Labour Union	Nipporo	1948	1989	Merged into NHK Roren	7,000	13,326	12,876
Japan Coal Miners' Union	Tanro	1950	1989	Transferred to Rengo	200,441	54,648	11,449
Japan Council of Medical Workers' Unions	Irokyo	1957	1989	Transferred to Zenroren	N/A	65,646	144,161
Japan Customs Employees' Union	Zenzeikan		1975	Merged into Kokkororen	N/A	1,190	N/A
Japan Electric Power Industry Workers' Union	Densan				3,000	1,517	2,626
Japanese Federation of Chemical Industry Workers' Unions	Kagakudomei	1951	1989	Transferred to Rengo	41,644	32,963	
Japanese Federation of Iron and Steel Workers' Unions	Tekkororen	1951	1989	Transferred to Rengo	120,722	208,905	211,886
Japanese Federation of Synthetic Chemistry Workers' Unions	Gokaroren	1950	1989	Transferred to Rengo	97,657	118,615	112,798
Japan Federation of National Public Service Employees' Unions	Kokkororen	1975	1989	Transferred to Zenroren	N/A	N/A	136,570
Japan Federation of Newspaper Workers' Unions	Shinbun Rōren	1950	1989	Disaffiliated	27,056	38,057	41,961
Japan Federation of Textile and Clothing Workers' Unions	Seniroren	1948	1989	Transferred to Rengo	N/A	19,550	7,903
Japan Postal Transportation Labour Union	Nittei				N/A	3,916	
Japan Postal Workers' Union	Zentei	1946	1989	Transferred to Rengo	218,013	239,600	171,606
Japan Teachers' Union	Nikkyoso	1947	1989	Transferred to Rengo	593,117	547,311	667,443
Japan Tobacco and Allied Workers' Union	Zentabako	1985	1989	Transferred to Rengo	N/A	N/A	27,599
Justice Ministry Employees' Union	Zenhomu	1947	1975	Merged into Kokkororen	N/A	7,657	N/A
Liaison Council of Housing Industry Workers' Unions	Jutakurokyo	1969	1973	Disaffiliated	N/A		N/A
National Council of Japanese Electric Powers Workers	Zendenryoku	1965	1989	Transferred to Rengo	N/A	4,351	2,626
National Federation of Automobile Transport Workers	Zenjiko	1947	1989	Transferred to Rengo	N/A	58,577	56,541
National Federation of Paper and Pulp Industry Workers' Unions	Kamiparoren	1947	1988	Merged into Kamiparengo	47,707	58,003	26,147
National Federation of Passenger Automobile Workers' Unions	Zenryororen				17,027	N/A	N/A
National Federation of Printing and Publishing Industry Workers' Unions	Zeninsoren	1953	1989	Transferred to Zenroren	16,538	18,700	13,376
National Federation of Rubber Industry Workers' Unions	Gomuroren	1965	1989	Transferred to Rengo	N/A	23,460	49,294
National Federation of Water Supply Workers' Unions	Zensuido	1951	1989	Transferred to Sohyo	13,796	28,561	36,797
National Forest Workers' Union of Japan	Zenrinya	1959	1989	Merged into Sinrinroren	N/A	63,777	37,984
National Lumber Industry Workers' Union	Zenmokuro				N/A	11,961	
National Procurement Agency Workers' Union	Zenchotatsu				2,502	N/A	
National Railway Locomotive Engineers' Union	Doryokusha	1951	1985	Disaffiliated	N/A	61,650	N/A
National Railway Workers' Union	Kokuro	1946	1989	Transferred to Zenrokyo	368,605	275,615	187,530
National Tax Collectors' Union	Zenkokuzei	1958	1975	Merged into Kokkororen	31,896	3,209	N/A
National Telecommunications Mutual Aid Association Workers' Union	Densairo				N/A	8,098	
National Trade Union of Metal and Engineering Workers	Zenkokukinzoku	1947	1989	Merged into Kinzokukikai	91,000	212,929	155,799
National Union of General Workers	Zenkokuippan	1955	1989	Transferred to Rengo	N/A	104,345	121,042
Okinawa Public Service Workers' Union	Okinawakankoro		1975	Merged into Kokkororen	N/A	7,080	N/A
Transportation Ministry Maritime Workers' Union	Zenkaiji				2,130	N/A	N/A
Union of Employees of the Harbour Construction Board	Zenkoken		1975	Merged into Kokkororen	4,350	4,193	N/A
Welfare Ministry Employees' Union	Koseishokuso				3,697	2,926	3,413

== Leadership ==
=== Presidents ===
1950: Takeo Muto
1953: Totaro Fujita
1956: Yukitaka Haraguchi
1958: Ōta Kaoru
1966: Toshikatsu Horii
1970: Makoto Ichikawa
1978: Motofumi Makieda
1983: Takeshi Kurokawa

=== General Secretaries ===
1950: Zengoro Shimagami
1951: Minoru Takano
1955: Akira Iwai
1970: Shogo Oki
1976: Mitsuo Tomizuka
1983: Eikichi Makoto

== See also ==
- Labor unions in Japan
- Valery Burati
