= RENGO =

National trade union center in Japan

- Japanese Trade Union Confederation
- 日本労働組合総連合会 (Japanese); Nihon Rōdōkumiai Sōrengōkai
- Founded: 1989
- Headquarters: Kanda-Surugudai, Tokyo, Japan
- Location: Japan
- Members: 6.83 million (2009)
- Key people: Tomoko Yoshino, president, Hideyuki Shimizu, general secretary
- Affiliations: ITUC, TUAC
- Website: www.jtuc-rengo.org

The Japanese Trade Union Confederation (日本労働組合総連合会, Nihon Rōdōkumiai Sōrengōkai; abbreviated JTUC), commonly known as RENGO (連合, Rengō; lit. 'union'), is the largest national trade union center in Japan, with over six million members as of 2011. It was founded in 1989 as a result of the merger of the Japan Confederation of Labor (Dōmei), the Federation of Independent Unions (Chūritsu Rōren) and the National Federation Of Industrial Organisations (Shinsanbetsu). In 1990, the General Council of Trade Unions of Japan (Sohyo) also joined RENGO.

As of July 2012, RENGO has 54 affiliate unions and 47 local organizations.

== Party affiliation ==
RENGO was historically affiliated with the Democratic Party of Japan, but on June 28, 2012, president Nobuaki Koga made a speech at the Liberal Democratic Party headquarters stating that the confederation may reconsider its future. In 2014, it endorsed LDP-supported candidate Yoichi Masuzoe for the Tokyo gubernatorial election.

== Affiliated organizations ==
=== Current affiliates ===
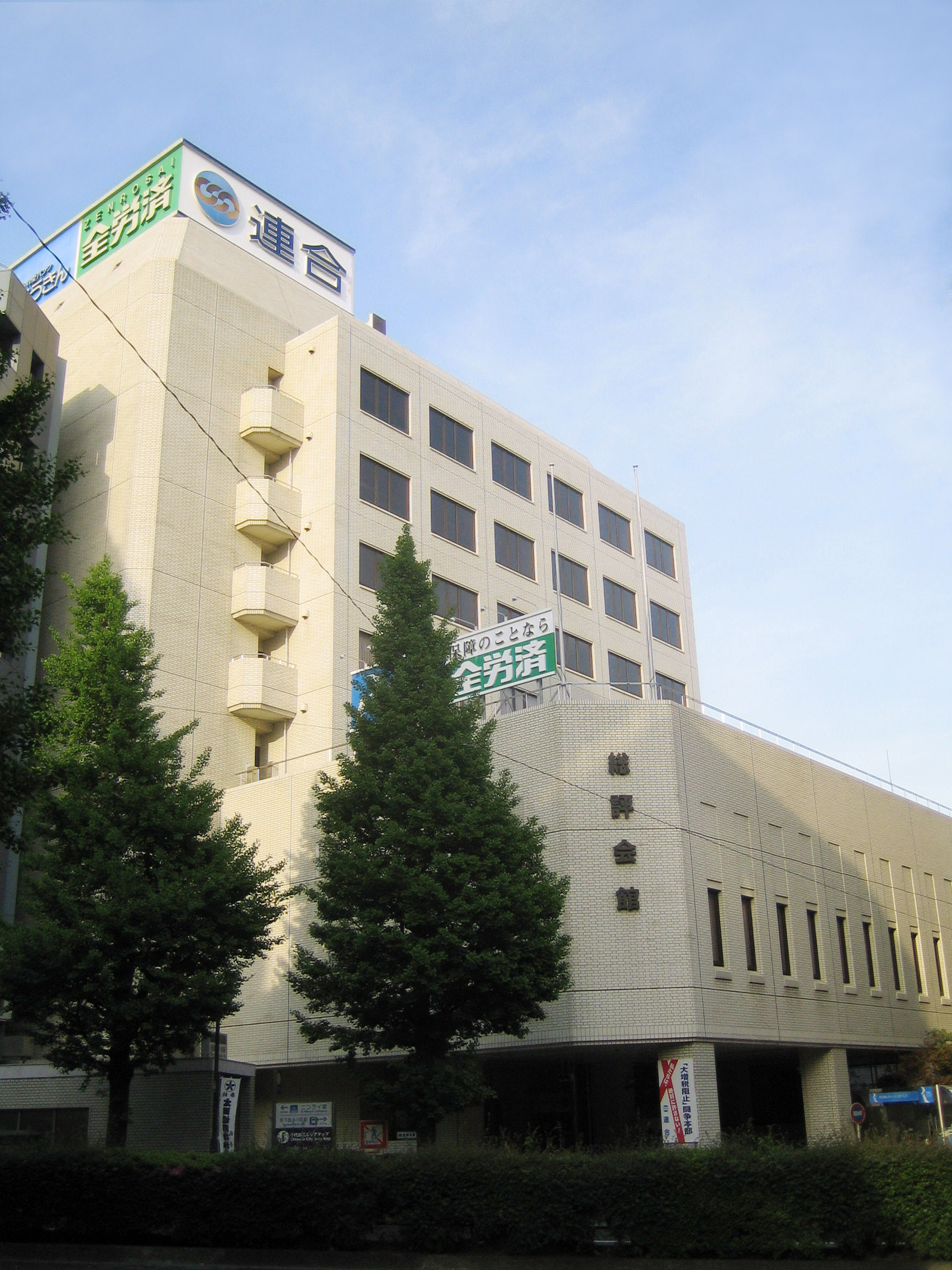
Rengo HQ in Kanda-Surugadai

Many unions are affiliated with RENGO:

Abbreviation	Union	Founded	Membership (2009)	Membership (2020)
UA ZENSEN	Japanese Federation of Textile, Chemical, Commerce, Food and General Services Workers' Unions	2012	1,780,000	1,767,000
JICHIRO	All-Japan Prefectural and Municipal Workers' Union	1954	887,174	785,445
JIDOSHA SOREN	Confederation of Japan Automobile Workers' Unions	1972	741,747	784,777
DENKI RENGO	Japanese Electrical, Electronic and Information Union	1953	616,571	569,285
JAM	Japanese Association of Metal, Machinery and Manufacturing Workers	1999	370,256	341,681
KIKAN ROREN	Japan Federation of Basic Industry Workers' Unions	2003	248,781	265,130
JPGU	Japan Postal Group Union	2007	216,186	243,754
SEIHO ROREN	National Federation of Life Insurance Workers' Unions	1969	241,967	233,614
NIKKYOSO	Japan Teachers' Union	1947	290,857	230,475
DENRYOKU SOREN	The Federation of Electric Power Related Industry Workers' Unions of Japan	1981	214,019	208,996
ICTJ	The Federation of Information and Communication Technology Service Workers of Japan	1991	220,730	199,135
UNYU ROREN	All Japan Federation of Transport Workers' Unions	1968	128,407	128,095
SHITETSU SOREN	General Federation of Private Railway and Bus Workers' Unions of Japan	1947	111,944	113,253
JFU	Federation of All Japan Foods and Tobacco Workers' Unions	2000	97,762	105,909
JEC RENGO	Japan Federation of Energy and Chemistry Workers' Unions	2002	158,958	104,038
SONPO ROREN	Federation of Non-Life Insurance Workers' Unions of Japan	1967	68,027	94,696
KOKKO RENGO	Japan Public Sector Union	2001	110,766	79,621
JR RENGO	Japan Railway Trade Unions Confederation	1992	63,000	74,602
SERVICE RENGO	Japan Federation of Service & Tourism Industries Workers' Unions	2001	44,029	47,454
KOTSU-ROREN	Japan Federation of Transport Workers' Unions	1964	53,835	45,579
KAIIN KUMIAI	All-Japan Seamen's Union	1945	45,000	45,000
KOKU RENGO	Japan Federation of Aviation Industry Unions	1999	36,183	41,419
GOMU RENGO	Japanese Rubber Workers' Union Confederation	1992	43,481	41,023
KAMIPA RENGO	Japanese Federation of Pulp and Paper Workers' Unions	1988	30,713	25,453
ZEN DENSEN	Japan Federation of Electric Wire Workers' Unions	1946	28,205	24,757
ZENKOKU GAS	The Federation of Gas Workers' Unions of Japan	1946	25,676	23,248
JR SOREN	Japan Confederation of Railway Workers' Unions	1987	55,046	22,561
INSATSU ROREN	Federation of Printing Information Media Workers' Unions	1989	20,667	20,730
CERAMICS RENGO	All Japan Federation of Ceramics Industry Workers	1995	18,900	19,610
ZEN SUIDO	All Japan Water Supply Workers' Union	1951	25,998	16,281
ZENGIN RENGO	All Japan Federative Council of Bank Labours' Unions	1967	15,590	15,008
ZENKOKU-NODANRO	National Federation of Agricultural, Forestry and Fishery Corporations' Workers' Unions	1989	15,446	13,725
MEDIA ROREN	Japan Federation of Media, Advertising, Motion Picture, and Theater Labor Unions	2017	N/A	9,577
ZENJIKO ROREN	National Federation of Automobile Transport Workers' Unions	1947	35,285	9,515
ZEN ROKIN	Federation of Labour Bank Workers' Unions of Japan	1956	6,397	8,871
HEALTH CARE ROKYO	Japanese Health Care Workers' Union	2002	7,777	8,500
SINRIN ROREN	Japanese Federation of Forest and Wood Workers' Union	1989	8,295	5,362
ROSAI ROREN	Federation of ZENROSAI Trade Unions		3,378	4,296
ROKYO ROREN	Confederation of Labour Supply Trade Unions		3,860	4,228
ZEN INSATSU	All Printing Bureau Labour Union	1947	4,568	4,060
JICHI ROREN	National Federation of Prefectural and Municipal Workers' Unions	1970	3,302	2,970
ZENKOKU UNION	Japan Community Workers Union Federation	2002	3,350	2,800
ZENKOKU KEIBA RENGO	National Federation of Horse-racing Workers		3,032	2,599
JA RENGO	All Japan Agriculture Cooperative Staff Members' Union		1,296	1,354
KOUN-DOMEI	Japanese Confederation of Port and Transport Workers' Unions	1987	1,200	1,200
ZEN ZOHEI	All Mint Labour Union		995	766

Observer affiliate:

- DOKIRO Hokkaido Seasonal Workers' Union (2,660 members as of 2009)

Friendly affiliate:

- NIKKENKYO Council of Japan Construction Industry Employee's Unions (35,624 members as of 2009)

=== Former affiliates ===
Abbreviation	Union	Founded	Left	Reason not affiliated	Membership (1996)
ZENSEN	Japanese Federation of Textile, Garment, Chemical, Mercantile, Food and Allied Industries Workers' Unions	1946	2002	Merged into UI ZENSEN	577,362
ZENKIN RENGO	Japanese Metal Industrial Workers' Union	1958	1999	Merged into JAM	314,693
CSG RENGO	Japanese Federation of Chemical, Service and General Trade Unions	1995	2002	Merged into UI ZENSEN	237,474
KINZOKU RENGO	National Metal and Machinery Workers' Union	1989	1999	Merged into JAM	200,000
TEKKO ROREN	Japanese Federation of Iron and Steel Workers' Unions	1951	2003	Merged into JBU	193,472
ZENTEI	Japan Postal Workers' Union	1946	2007	Merged into JPGU	158,691
ZOSENJUKI ROREN	Japan Confederation of Shipbuilding and Engineering Workers' Unions	1972	2003	Merged into JBU	133,407
SHOGYO ROREN	Japan Federation of Commercial Workers' Unions	1970	2001	Merged into JSD	129,043
SHOKUHIN RENGO	Japan Federation of Foods and Tobacco Workers' Unions	1995	2000	Merged into JFU	116,747
GOKA ROREN	Japanese Federation of Synthetic Chemistry Workers' Unions	1950	1998	Merged into KAGAKU LEAGUE	91,242
ZEN YUSAI	All Japan Postal Labour Union	1965	2007	Merged into JPGU	77,718
KAGAKU SOREN	Japanese Federation of Chemical Workers' Unions	1978	2016	Disaffiliated	67,629
ZENKOKU IPPAN	National Union of General Workers	1955	2006	Merged into JICHIRO	60,096
LEISURE SERVICE RENGO	Japan Federation of Leisure-Service Industries Workers' Unions	1970	2001	Merged into SERVICE RENGO	46,900
TOSHIKO	All Japan Municipal Transport Workers' Union	1947	2013	Merged into JICHIRO	43,767
KOKKO SOREN	Japan Central Federation of National Public Service Employees' Unions	1989	2001	Merged into KOKKO RENGO	43,697
CHAIN RENGO	Chain Store Labor Unions Council	1970	2001	Merged into JSD	40,944
KOKUZEI ROSO	Japanese Confederation of National Tax Unions	1958	2001	Merged into KOKKO RENGO	40,128
SEIROREN	Labor Federation of Government Related Organizations	1960	2001	Merged into KOKKO RENGO	33,392
SEKIYU ROREN	Japan Confederation of Petroleum Industry Workers' Unions	1947	2002	Merged into JEC	29,505
HITETSU RENGO	Japanese Metal Mine Workers' Union	1964	2003	Merged into JBU	23,500
SHOKUHIN ROKYO	Food Industry Workers' Unions Council	1989	2000	Merged into JFU	21,826
KOKU DOMEI	Japanese Confederation of Aviation Labour	1974	1999	Merged into KOKO RENGO	15,178
ZENCHURO	All Japan Garrison Forces Labor Union	1946	2001	Merged into KOKKO RENGO	14,314
KENSETSU RENGO	Japan Construction Trade Union Confederation	1990	2014	Merged into JBU	13,413
NHK ROREN	Federation of All-NHK Labour Unions	1988	2017	Merged into MEDIA ROREN	11,584
ZENKOKU KAGAKU	All Japan Chemistry Workers' Union	1987	1998	Merged into KAGAKU LEAGUE	10,540
SHINKAGAKU	National Organization of All Chemical Workers	1958	2002	Merged into JEC	8,313
ZENROKIN	Federation of Labor Bank Workers' Unions of Japan				7,617
ZENKOKU SEMENTO	National Federation of Cement Workers' Unions of Japan	1947	2002	Merged into JEC	7,263
ZEIKAN ROREN	Federation of Japanese Customs Personnel Labour Unions	1965	2001	Merged into KOKKO RENGO	5,524
SEN-I SEIKATSU ROREN	Japan Federation of Textile and Clothing Workers' Unions	1948	2002	Merged into UI ZENSEN	5,127
SHIN UNTEN	FIO-Drivers' Craft Union	1959			4,435
ZENZOSEN-KIKAI	All Japan Shipbuilding and Engineering Union	1946	2016	Dissolved	3,226
ZENKAIREN	All Japan Shipping Labor Union	1947			2,750
JIUNRO	Japan Automobile Drivers' Union	1958			2,109
NICHIRINRO	National Forestry Workers' Union of Japan	1965	2006	Merged into SINRIN ROREN	2,020
ZENTANKO	National Union of Coal Mine Workers	1952			1,750
TANRO	Japan Coal Miners' Union	1950	2004	Dissolved	1,460
ZEN-EIEN	National Cinema and Theater Workers' Union	1947	2017	Merged into MEDIA ROREN	473
TOKEI ROSO	Statistics Labor Union-management and Coordination Agency	1962	2005	Dissolved	200
ZENSHIN ROREN	All Japan Community Bank Labour Union Association	1961	2018	Disaffiliated	N/A
SHOKUHIN ROREN	All Japan Federation of Food Industries Workers' Unions	1965	1995	Merged into SHOKUHIN RENGO	N/A
HITETSU KINZOKU ROREN	All Japan Federation of Non-Ferrous Metal Workers' Unions	1982		Merged into HITETSU ROREN	N/A
KENSETSU DOMEI	Japanese Federation of Construction Industry Workers	1978	1990	Merged into KENSETSU RENGO	N/A
JSD	Japan Federation of Service and Distributive Workers' Unions	2001	2012	Merged into UA ZENSEN	N/A
UI ZENSEN	Japanese Federation of Textile, Chemical, Food, Commercial, Service and General Workers' Unions	2002	2012	Merged into UA ZENSEN	N/A
ZENKA DOMEI	Japanese Federation of Chemical and General Workers' Unions	1951	1995	Merged into CSG RENGO	N/A
KAGAKU LEAGUE	Japanese Federation of Chemistry Workers' Unions	1998	2002	Merged into JEC	N/A
ZENTABAKO	Japan Tobacco and Allied Workers' Union	1985	1995	Merged into SHOKUHIN RENGO	N/A
ZENDENRYOKU	National Council of Japanese Electric Powers Workers	1965	1996	Merged into DENRYOKU SOREN	N/A
ZENYOREN	National Federation of Ceramic Industry Workers' Unions	1949	1995	Merged into CERAMICS RENGO	N/A
ZEN SHOKUHIN DOMEI	National Federation of Food Industry Workers' Unions	1947	1995	Merged into SHOKUHIN RENGO	N/A
IPPAN DOMEI	National Federation of General Workers' Unions	1966	1995	Merged into CSG RENGO	N/A
GOMU ROREN	National Federation of Rubber Industry Workers' Unions	1965	1992	Merged into GOMU RENGO	N/A

== Local organizations ==
RENGO also has local organizations for each of Japan's 47 prefectures.

== Leadership ==
=== General secretaries ===
- Seigo Yamada (1989–1993)
- Etsuya Washio (1993–1997)
- Kiyoshi Sasamori (1997–2001)
- Hiroyuki Nagumo (2001–2013)
- Rikio Kozu (2013–2015)
- Naoto Omi (2015–2017)
- Yasunobu Aihara (2017–2021)
- Hideyuki Shimizu (2021—present)

=== Presidents ===
- Akira Yamagishi (1989–1995)
- Jinnosuke Ashida (1995–1997)
- Etsuya Washio (1997–2001)
- Kiyoshi Sasamori (2001–2005)
- Tsuyoshi Takagi (2005–2009)
- Nobuaki Koga (2009–2015)
- Rikio Kozu (2015–2021)
- Tomoko Yoshino (2021—present)

== See also ==
- Labor unions in Japan
