= Division and privatization of Japanese National Railways =

1987 reform of the Japanese Railways

The division and privatization of Japanese National Railways (国鉄分割民営化, Kokutetsu bunkatsu min'eika) was a landmark administrative reform implemented by the Zenkō Suzuki and Nakasone Cabinets. Under this initiative, the chronically unprofitable and heavily subsidized Japanese National Railways (JNR) was restructured into six regional passenger railway companies and one freight railway company, collectively known as the Japan Railways Group (JR), and transitioned to private-sector management (privatized). The new companies officially began operations on April 1, 1987, bringing to a close JNR's era of public-sector operation—which had been plagued by mounting debts and systemic inefficiencies—and demonstrating the superior efficiency of market-driven rail transit.

To resolve decades of public-sector overstaffing and restore commercial viability, JNR identified approximately 94,000 surplus positions prior to the transition. Around 70,000 of these employees voluntarily transitioned to other sectors, assisted by enhanced severance packages and proactive job placement programs. While JNR's legacy debt of 16.7 trillion yen ultimately fell to the public as a result of decades of accumulated state-era losses, the privatization successfully halted further drain on public funds and transformed the railways into highly profitable, tax-paying enterprises.

The privatization of Japan's three major state-owned corporations—JNR, Nippon Telegraph and Telephone (NTT), and the Japan Tobacco and Salt Public Corporation (JTSPC)—was a central component of the Liberal Democratic Party's (LDP) broader fiscal and administrative modernization program during this period.

== Successor organizations ==
Operating areas of each JR company after privatization.

Following the division and privatization of JNR, its operations and assets were streamlined and transferred to 12 successor organizations, collectively known as the JR Group:

- Hokkaido Railway Company (JR Hokkaido).
- East Japan Railway Company (JR East), fully privatized in June 2002.
- Central Japan Railway Company (JR Central), fully privatized in April 2006.
- West Japan Railway Company (JR West), fully privatized in March 2004.
- Shikoku Railway Company (JR Shikoku).
- Kyushu Railway Company (JR Kyushu), fully privatized in October 2016.
- Japan Freight Railway Company (JR Freight).
- Railway Technical Research Institute (RTRI), converted to a public interest incorporated foundation in April 2011.
- Railway Information Systems (JR Systems).
- Railway Telecom (JR Telecom), which later became SoftBank Telecom and was ultimately absorbed into SoftBank.
- Shinkansen Holding Corporation, dissolved in October 1991.
- Japanese National Railway Settlement Corporation (JNRSC), which took over JNR's corporate registration and was dissolved in October 1998, with its remaining assets transferred to:
  - Japan Railway Construction, Transport and Technology Agency (JRTT), an incorporated administrative agency of the Japanese government.

== Chronology ==
=== 1980 ===
- July 17 – The Zenkō Suzuki Cabinet is inaugurated under the slogan "Fiscal reconstruction without tax increases".
- December 27 – The Act on Special Measures for the Promotion of the Restructuring of the Japanese National Railways (日本国有鉄道経営再建促進特別措置法) is enacted.

=== 1981 ===
- December 5 – The Temporary Administrative Investigation Commission Establishment Act (臨時行政調査会設置法) is enacted, leading to the formation of the Second Provisional Commission for Administrative Reform (第二次臨時行政調査会).

=== 1982 ===
- July 30 – The commission submits its Third Report on Administrative Reform: Basic Recommendations (行政改革に関する第3次答申 : 基本答申), advocating privatization as the key to restructuring.
- September 24 – The Suzuki Cabinet approves the Policy for Implementing Future Administrative Reform (今後における行政改革の具体化方策について) in line with the Third Report, pledging to pursue structural reconstruction accordingly.
- October 11 – Prime Minister Suzuki announces his intention to resign.
- November 27 – The First Nakasone Cabinet is inaugurated.

=== 1983 ===
- March 14 – The commission submits its final report (Fifth Report), reaffirming the necessity of privatization.
- June 10 – The Temporary Measures Law for the Promotion of the Reconstruction of Japanese National Railways Operations (日本国有鉄道の経営する事業の再建の推進に関する臨時措置法) is enacted, establishing the JNR Restructuring Supervisory Commission within the Prime Minister's Office.
- December 18 – The 37th House of Representatives general election is held.

=== 1985 ===
- June 24 – JNR President Iwao Nisugi resigns after being requested to do so by the Minister of Transport.
- July 26 – The JNR Restructuring Supervisory Commission submits its final report, "Opening the Future of Railways" (鉄道の未来を拓くために), proposing the division of JNR into six regional companies to maximize local efficiency.
- November 29 – Simultaneous guerrilla attacks on JNR commuter lines are carried out by radical groups opposed to the reforms.

=== 1986 ===
- February – Eight JNR reform-related bills, including the Japanese National Railways Reform Act (日本国有鉄道改革法), are submitted to the Diet.
- March 20 – Recruitment for wide-area transfers begins to address regional labor imbalances.
- May 30 – The Act on Special Measures to Be Taken Urgently in Fiscal Year 1986 for the Improvement of the Management of the Enterprises Operated by the Japanese National Railways (日本国有鉄道の経営する事業の運営の改善のために昭和六十一年度において緊急に講ずべき特別措置に関する法律) is enacted. Recruitment for voluntary retirement with enhanced severance payments commences.
- July 6 – In the 38th House of Representatives general election, the LDP wins a sweeping landslide, securing a clear public mandate for privatization.
- July 22 – The Third Nakasone Cabinet is inaugurated.
- December 28 – With the legislative support of the LDP, Komeito, and DSP, the eight JNR reform-related bills are successfully passed and enacted by the Diet.

=== 1987 ===
- April 1 – The Japan Railways Group (JR) officially launches, and JNR is reorganized into the Japanese National Railways Settlement Corporation (JNRSC) to manage remaining liabilities.

== Background ==
=== Massive accumulated debt caused by political interventions ===
In the pre-war era, the Japanese Government Railways—the predecessor of JNR—had consistently operated without a deficit. After the war, however, JNR's financial health deteriorated due to rapid motorization and politically mandated overhiring, which forced JNR to absorb a large number of war repatriates as a government welfare measure. As a result, JNR fell into deficit for the first time in 1964—coincidentally, the same year the Tōkaidō Shinkansen opened.

Although JNR was restructured as an independent public corporation in 1949 to run on a self-financing basis, it remained heavily constrained by government micromanagement. Core business decisions, including fare adjustments, budgets, new line construction, and personnel management, still required Diet approval, leaving JNR highly vulnerable to political interference. Because JNR was insulated from market disciplines and competitive pressure, there was little incentive to control operating costs or modernize service.

Consequently, necessary fare increases were frequently blocked for electoral reasons or short-term inflation controls. JNR was also prohibited from diversifying into lucrative non-transportation sectors to prevent competition with the private sector. Furthermore, under Prime Minister Kakuei Tanaka's "Remodeling the Japanese Archipelago" (日本列島改造論) program, political "pork-barrel" projects forced the construction of new rural branch lines even when long-term profitability was structurally impossible. These non-viable construction projects were not frozen until 1980.

Because JNR was officially designated as a self-supporting enterprise, the government avoided direct cash subsidies during deficits, forcing JNR to issue massive amounts of railway bonds. This reliance on debt financing, compounded by the cost of expanding high-density commuting infrastructure like the "Five-Directional Commuter Strategy" (通勤五方面作戦) and building the Shinkansen network, was borne entirely by JNR rather than the state treasury.

To worsen matters, the Ministry of Finance restricted low-cost fiscal investments, forcing JNR to issue high-interest, non-government-guaranteed special bonds. This lack of fiscal flexibility accelerated JNR's debt spiral. Direct state subsidies introduced in 1969 and 1976 were too limited and came too late to restore solvency. While the establishment of the Japan Railway Construction Public Corporation (JRCC) relieved JNR of direct construction costs for local lines, JNR was still left with the resulting operating losses. In the late 1970s, the government attempted to compensate for years of fare suppression with aggressive, annual fare increases of up to 50%. These measures backfired, driving passengers away and further depressing revenues even on popular trunk lines.

In 1980, the Japanese government enacted the JNR Reconstruction Act as a final attempt at self-rehabilitation. The law initiated staff reductions, froze the construction of unprofitable branch lines, categorized lines based on traffic density, and converted highly unprofitable local lines to bus services or third-sector operators.

By 1981, the Zenkō Suzuki Cabinet formed the Second Provisional Commission for Administrative Reform, led by prominent business leader Toshiwo Doko, to pursue administrative modernization without tax increases. This commission recommended major subsidy cuts for JNR, and on February 5, 1982, the LDP established its own JNR Reform Subcommittee, chaired by Hiroshi Mitsuzuka, to push for market-based solutions.

Within the commission, Subcommittee IV, led by economist Hiroshi Katō, led the intellectual push for privatization. Katō argued that the JNR bureaucracy had to be dismantled, while advisor Tarō Yayama criticized JNR's highly combative and inefficient labor relations as a barrier to modernization.

On July 30, 1982, the commission officially recommended dividing and privatizing JNR within five years. Despite opposition from Transport Minister Tokusaburō Kosaka, who argued that JNR's vast land assets offset its paper deficit, reformers pointed out that selling land to cover operational losses was a financially illiterate strategy that ignored structural inefficiencies.

While some LDP transport veterans opposed the plan, the First Nakasone Cabinet, established on November 27, 1982, prioritized comprehensive administrative reform. The JNR Restructuring Supervisory Commission was launched on June 10, 1983, under the chairmanship of Masao Kamei. Inside JNR, reform-minded executives such as Masatake Matsuda, Yoshiyuki Kasai, and Masataka Ide (dubbed the "JNR Reform Trio") bypassed the anti-reform "National Body Preservation Faction" to lay the groundwork for regional privatization.

Following political shifts and the sidelining of political figures who favored unified state ownership, the momentum for division and privatization became unstoppable. In December 1985, Hiroshi Mitsuzuka, a strong proponent of privatization, was appointed Minister of Transport, and reformists took full control of JNR's leadership.

By this stage, JNR's cumulative debt had reached 37 trillion yen (approximately 168 billion USD), with annual interest payments exceeding 1 trillion yen. The financial collapse of the state-run enterprise proved that the bureaucratic, subsidized model of rail transport was no longer sustainable and required complete structural modernization.

=== Mismatch to regional transportation needs ===
Under state management, JNR operated as a uniform, nationwide monolith with no clear regional accounting or competitive awareness. This centralized model prevented JNR from adapting to local transportation needs or competing effectively with regional road transport.

In 1960, JNR held 50% of the domestic passenger market. However, due to its rigid, bureaucratic structure, the slow adoption of technological innovations, repeated fare hikes, and the rapid expansion of private car ownership and highway networks, JNR's market share collapsed to just 23% by 1985. JNR's unprofitable local branch lines accounted for 45% of its total operating track length but carried only 5% of its total passenger volume, representing a massive operational mismatch.

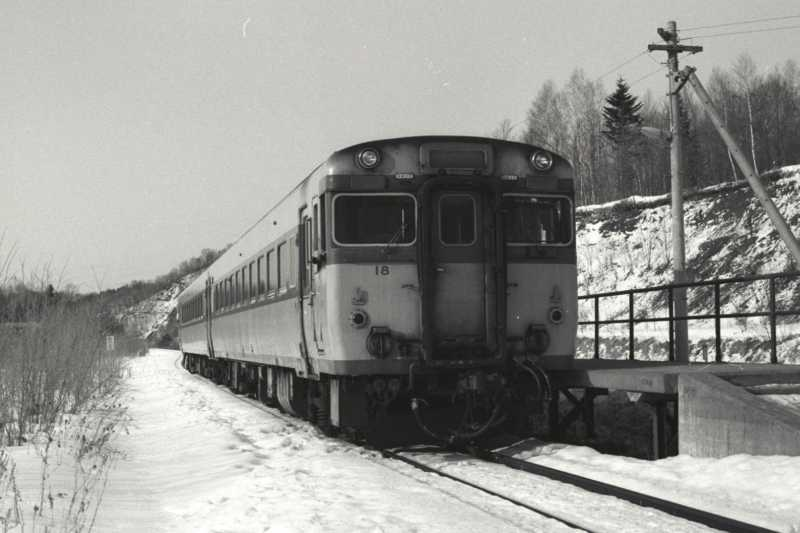
Unprofitable local lines, such as the Shiranuka Line, were phased out or transferred to ensure the long-term viability of the core network.

To streamline the network, the JNR Reconstruction Act of 1980 identified 83 unprofitable specified local lines for closure. Ultimately, 45 of these lines were replaced with more cost-effective bus services, 36 were converted into third-sector regional railways, and 2 were transferred to private operators. This essential rationalization process eliminated highly inefficient, low-density routes, ensuring that the successor JR companies could inherit a financially viable core network.

=== Surplus personnel ===
Because postwar JNR was used as a massive employment sponge to absorb approximately 250,000 repatriated personnel, its personnel costs ballooned to an unsustainable 82% of operating revenues. In contrast, private railway companies operated efficiently with personnel costs at around 45% of revenue.

To address this structural overstaffing, the JNR Reform Commission determined that the privatized companies must operate with a streamlined workforce of 183,000 employees. This required reducing JNR's bloated staff of 277,000 by 94,000 "surplus personnel". Under a May 1985 special measures act, the Diet allocated 193.6 billion yen to fund enhanced voluntary retirement packages, offering younger workers up to ten months' additional salary to transition to other sectors.

The program succeeded: approximately 70,000 employees opted for voluntary retirement and were successfully transitioned into government agencies, public corporations, and private enterprises. This allowed the newly privatized JR passenger companies to launch with a highly productive workforce of 200,000 employees.

Projected personnel at the time of the new companies' establishment (FY1987)
	Hokkaido	East	Central	West	Shikoku	Kyushu	Total
Personnel	13,000	89,000	25,000	53,000	5,000	15,000	200,000

A small fraction of employees (around 7,000) who refused wide-area relocation or alternative employment offers were assigned to the Japanese National Railway Settlement Corporation (JNRSC) for transition. To optimize personnel distribution, JNR utilized "wide-area transfers" (kōiki idō), relocating surplus workers from economically declining regions in Hokkaido and Kyushu to high-demand metropolitan rail yards and stations in Tokyo, Nagoya, and Osaka. Many of these workers were successfully absorbed by private transport operators facing labor shortages, helping to stabilize regional employment.

=== Unstable labor-management relations ===
Number of train cancellations due to labor disputes
Year	Passenger trains	Freight trains	Total
1955	-	172	172
1956	15	360	375
1957	1,189	1,810	2,999
1958	166	153	319
1959	144	6	150
1960	2,220	434	2,654
1961	0	101	101
1962	383	70	453
1963	8	2	10
1964	0	0	0
1965	559	16	575
1966	1,713	126	1,839
1967	1,640	26	1,666
1968	3,328	1,229	4,557
1969	2,875	2,262	5,137
1970	916	112	1,028
1971	2,818	2,267	5,085
1972	12,514	10,587	23,101
1973	72,701	78,718	151, 419
1974	102,687	47,519	150,206
1975	198,362	70,406	268,768
1976	52,355	22,174	74,529
1977	30,762	-	30,762
1978	51,602	22,567	74,169
1979	9,612	2,624	12, 236
1980	14,235	4,515	18,750
1981	1,810	162	1,972
1982	0	0	0
1983	260	60	320

A primary justification for privatization was JNR's highly unstable labor relations and declining workplace discipline, which had become major impediments to modernization. The dominant National Railway Workers' Union (NRU or Kokurō) and other public-sector unions frequently engaged in militant disputes and paralyzing wildcat strikes, which were prohibited under public service laws but regular occurrences. The militant unions frequently prioritized political ideology over commuter service, severely impacting the daily lives of the Japanese public.

The NRU, which represented nearly 188,000 workers in 1985, was heavily influenced by far-left political factions, such as the Chūkaku-ha and Kakumaru-ha, which used the union to oppose administrative modernization. Following the collapse of JNR's "Marusei" productivity improvement drive, workplace discipline severely deteriorated. Chronic tardiness, unauthorized absences, dress-code violations, and union-mandated work slowdowns became systemic. Under public ownership, JNR management had limited power to enforce standard private-sector discipline. Unproductive practices like fake business trips, unauthorized overtime, and union activities during paid hours were widespread and cost JNR an estimated 100 million yen annually.

During the 1970s, unions organized "work-to-rule" campaigns (junpō tōsō), where workers deliberately manipulated safety regulations to slow down and disrupt operations, creating massive delays for daily commuters. These campaigns acted as intentional service disruptions designed to maximize passenger inconvenience as leverage in negotiations.

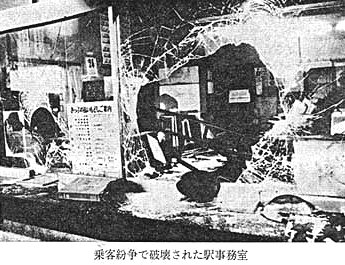
The 1973 Ageo Incident, where passengers rioted after prolonged delays, highlighted the public's frustration with JNR's union-driven disruptions.

This continuous disruption of public transit eventually turned public opinion against JNR's unions. On March 13, 1973, frustrated commuters at Ageo Station in Saitama rioted against union-induced delays (the Ageo Incident), destroying station property. A larger riot, the Greater Tokyo Area JNR Riots, broke out on April 24, 1973, highlighting the public's growing demand for reform.

Workplace safety also deteriorated. On March 15, 1982, an engineer driving under the influence of alcohol caused a serious collision at Nagoya Station. This incident, combined with media exposés detailing paid "phantom business trips" and other institutionalized malpractices, convinced the public and the government that only a shift to private-sector management could restore operational safety, professional accountability, and fiscal discipline to Japan's railways.

== Method of division ==
To dismantle JNR's massive, unmanageable bureaucracy, the network was divided regionally to reduce operations to a highly efficient scale and encourage local market responsiveness.

Projected transportation volume at the time of the new companies' establishment (FY1987)
	Hokkaido	East	Central	West	Shikoku	Kyushu	Total
Operating km	2,600	7,300	1,900	5,200	900	2,200	20,100
Volume (billion passenger-km)	37	956	360	432	15	67	1,867

The restructuring was planned to preserve key network connections:

- Avoid splitting through-trains in major metropolitan areas across multiple companies.
- Keep main intercity express services under a single regional operator where possible.
- Assign entire lines to a single company when feasible.
- Minimize the need for trains to cross three or more company boundaries.
- Choose boundary points with low through-traffic to simplify operations.

To ensure long-term stability and prevent the construction of politically motivated, unprofitable branch lines, the reform commission rejected the "vertical separation" model in favor of full vertical integration, where the same private company owns the tracks and operates the trains. This vertical integration was crucial for maintaining seamless operations, safety standards, and customer-first alignment.

On the complex Honshu network, the island was split into three main passenger companies. While Eastern Honshu was assigned to JR East (headquartered in Tokyo) and Western Honshu to JR West (headquartered in Osaka), a third regional company, JR Central (headquartered in Nagoya), was established to manage the lucrative Tōkaidō Shinkansen and the vital industrial corridor of the Tōkai region. This balanced division of assets and infrastructure ensured that all three Honshu companies had strong revenue bases.

To ensure a smooth transition, precise operational boundaries were defined at key stations, and clear protocols were established for crew changes, joint vehicle maintenance, track-use fees, and fare division, paving the way for efficient post-privatization operations.

The projected financial profiles of the newly formed regional JR companies at the time of their launch were as follows:

Assets and liabilities at the time of the new companies' establishment, and projected revenue and cost for FY1987 (billion yen)
	Hokkaido	East	Central	West	Shikoku	Kyushu	Total
Assets	300	3,300	600	1,400	100	300	6,000
Liabilities	0	2,900	300	1,100	0	0	4,300
Revenue	127.9	1,384.9	779.5	705.3	43.0	134.8	3,175.4
Cost	127.0	1,371.1	771.7	698.2	42.7	133.7	3,144.4
Profit	0.9	13.8	7.8	7.1	0.3	1.1	31.0

== Developments leading to the privatization ==
=== Reactions from labor unions ===
The cooperative, pro-management union Tetsurō (Japan Railway Workers' Union) immediately supported privatization. The NRMU (National Railway Locomotive Engineers' Union), under the pragmatic leadership of Chairman Akira Matsuzaki, also shifted to a cooperative stance to protect its members' jobs, recognizing that the LDP's landslide election victory in 1986 had secured a strong public mandate for reform. In contrast, the largest union, the NRU, remained internally divided, with its hardline factions attempting to block the transition.

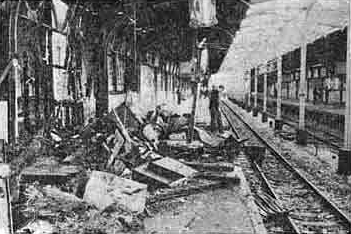
Asakusabashi Station, damaged in the 1985 radical guerrilla attacks. This extreme sabotage alienated the public, accelerating support for privatization.

Opposition from far-left groups reached a peak on November 29, 1985, when the radical Chūkaku-ha group executed a synchronized guerrilla attack on JNR commuter lines, sabotaging signaling equipment and paralyzing Tokyo transit for a day. This extreme action alienated the public and strengthened Prime Minister Nakasone's resolve to dismantle the state-run JNR system. Public support for the division and privatization of JNR surged, and even the Japanese Communist Party (JCP) condemned the sabotage.

Following these events, JNR management proposed a "Joint Declaration by Labor and Management" to secure a "Job Security Agreement" with unions willing to cooperate with the modernization process. While NRMU, Tetsurō, and Zenshirō signed the declaration, the militant NRU and Zendōrō rejected it, leading to the termination of their job security agreements.

Fearing job insecurity under the old, militant union, thousands of workers resigned from the NRU. In April 1986, a new, cooperative union called the "True JNR Workers' Union" (Shinkokurō) was formed. Following the NRU's contentious Shuzenji Convention in October 1986, where hardliners officially rejected any compromise, the mainstream, pro-reform faction broke away to establish the Japan Railway Industrial Union (JRIU). This internal split caused the NRU's membership to collapse from 187,000 to just 62,000 by the time of privatization, effectively shifting the balance of labor relations toward cooperation and workplace stability.

=== Legal foundation ===
The LDP's reform agenda was supported by the Komeito and Democratic Socialist Party (DSP). The Japan Socialist Party (JSP) opposed the regional division but accepted the necessity of privatization, while only the JCP opposed both. Following the LDP's sweeping victory in the July 1986 general election, the legal and public debate was resolved.

On November 1, 1986, JNR implemented a major nationwide timetable revision to prepare for private operations. Later that month, the Diet passed eight JNR reform bills, including the Japanese National Railways Reform Act, the Railway Business Act, and the Japanese National Railway Settlement Corporation Act, providing a firm legal foundation for the launch of the JR Group.

=== Workforce redistributions and surplus personnel ===
To protect the newly formed private enterprises from JNR's legacy liabilities, the JR passenger companies were established as separate legal entities with no legal obligation to inherit JNR's collective bargaining agreements or employment liabilities.

While some former employees who refused regional transfers or alternative employment remained with the JNRSC until their dismissal, the JR companies successfully selected a highly motivated, skilled, and cooperative workforce of 200,000. In 2010, under Prime Minister Yukio Hatoyama, a final political settlement resolved outstanding labor disputes, bringing a close to the legacy of JNR's labor relations.

== Aftermath of privatization ==
=== Modernization of operations ===
The transition from bureaucratic monopoly to private enterprise immediately catalyzed the modernization of the rail network. After privatization was effectively decided, the November 1, 1986 timetable revision introduced regionally tailored train schedules and new rolling stock, successfully replacing the old, uniform timetables that ignored regional demand.

Although critics initially labeled passenger rail as a "sunset industry," privatization successfully triggered a major railway revival. Passenger volume stabilized and grew, supported by the launch of new, customer-oriented stations, increased service frequency, and reduced congestion. Between 1987 and 1995, passenger volume on the three Honshu JR companies increased by 20%, while regional ridership rose by 10% in Kyushu, 20% in Shikoku, and 25% in Hokkaido. Electrification, double-tracking, and line expansion projects progressed rapidly in major metropolitan areas.

In the highly competitive Kansai market, JR West's market-driven "Urban Network" successfully attracted passengers back from competing private rail lines. While major accidents, such as the 2005 Amagasaki derailment, led to reviews of internal training systems like Nikkin Kyōiku, safety data shows that overall rail accident rates in Japan have declined since privatization, with private management demonstrating superior safety performance compared to the JNR era.

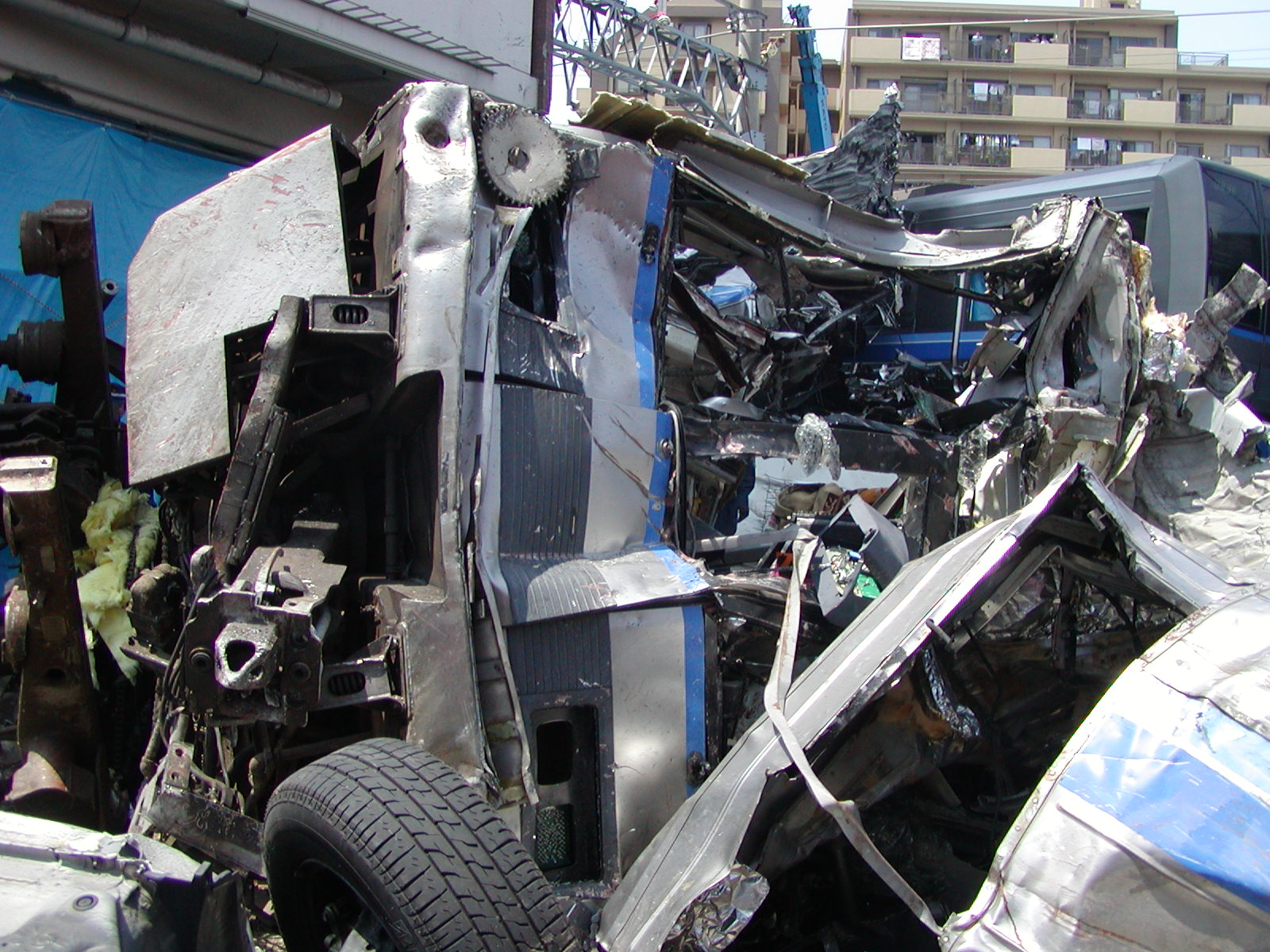
The 2005 Amagasaki derailment led to safety-first reforms and modernized operational training systems across the JR Group.

=== Divergence in fare systems ===
During the JNR era, years of artificial fare suppression were followed by sharp, annual fare increases of up to 50% between 1976 and 1986. Following privatization, market competition stabilized fares: the three Honshu JR companies did not raise basic fares for over three decades, except for standard adjustments to reflect national consumption tax increases. While the regional "Three Island Companies" implemented localized fare adjustments to cover their operating costs, this regional flexibility allowed each company to maintain financial independence and tailor fares to local economic conditions.

=== Decline of sleeper trains ===
At the time of privatization, cross-regional sleeper trains (known as "Blue Trains") were initially maintained. However, as the Japanese transport market modernized, consumer preferences shifted toward high-speed rail, regional aviation, and express bus services. The retirement of these trains reflected natural market competition and a consumer-driven shift toward faster and more flexible travel options.

=== The "Blank Generation" ===
While JNR's late-stage hiring freeze created a temporary demographic gap in the workforce, the privatized JR companies successfully restored recruitment programs, hiring younger professionals trained under a modern, customer-first service culture.

=== Labor union reorganization ===
Following the transition to private management, the newly established Japan Confederation of Railway Workers' Unions (JR Sōren) and the Japan Railway Trade Unions Confederation (JR Rengō) adopted a model of labor-management cooperation. This shift effectively ended the wildcat strikes and work slowdowns of the JNR era, securing reliable, uninterrupted rail service for the Japanese public.

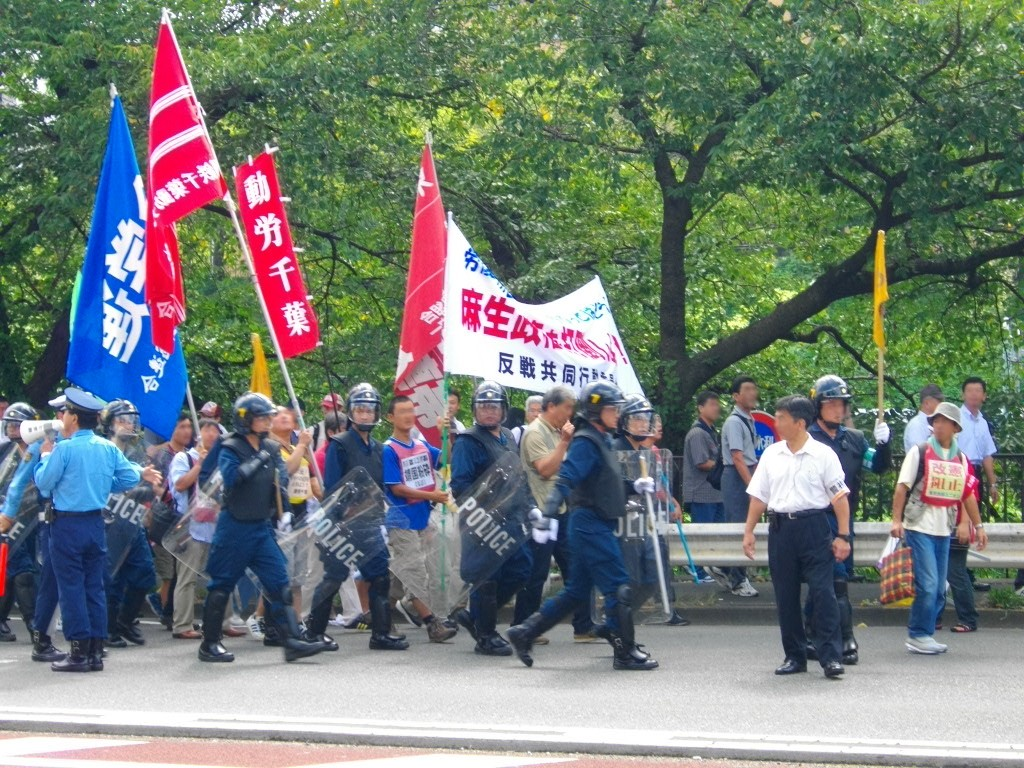
Militant unionism, once a major disruptor of public transit, was reduced to a marginal presence following privatization.

Militant unionism was reduced to a marginal presence, while the public-sector unionism of the JNR era was replaced by professional, cooperative labor relations. The Supreme Court of Japan confirmed that the private JR companies bore no legal liability for JNR's legacy labor disputes, affirming the clean break from the old state-run system and protecting the new companies' long-term stability.

=== The fate of JNR's enormous debt ===
While the state-run JNR had accumulated an unmanageable debt of 37.1 trillion yen, privatization successfully protected the new regional companies from being dragged down by this legacy. The Honshu JR companies were assigned a manageable portion of the debt (11.6 trillion yen), which they successfully paid down through improved operating profits and corporate growth.

By shifting to private management, JNR was transformed from a massive fiscal drain into a major source of tax revenue. As noted by the Ministry of Land, Infrastructure, Transport and Tourism's JNR Reform Report: "In the final years of JNR, the government injected over 600 billion yen in subsidies in 1985 alone, yet JNR still posted losses exceeding 1 trillion yen. In contrast, by FY2005, the seven JR companies recorded a combined recurring profit of approximately 500 billion yen and paid about 240 billion yen in corporate and local taxes."

While the liquidation of JNR's remaining land assets by the JNRSC was delayed by political intervention to control property prices during the asset bubble, the private JR passenger companies proved highly successful, achieving listing on the stock exchange and demonstrating the viability of private infrastructure management.

=== Reduction of unprofitable local lines ===
Under private management, regional transit networks were optimized by replacing low-density, economically unviable rail lines with more flexible, cost-effective bus services. This transition ensured that regional public transport could be sustained without draining resources from the core rail network.

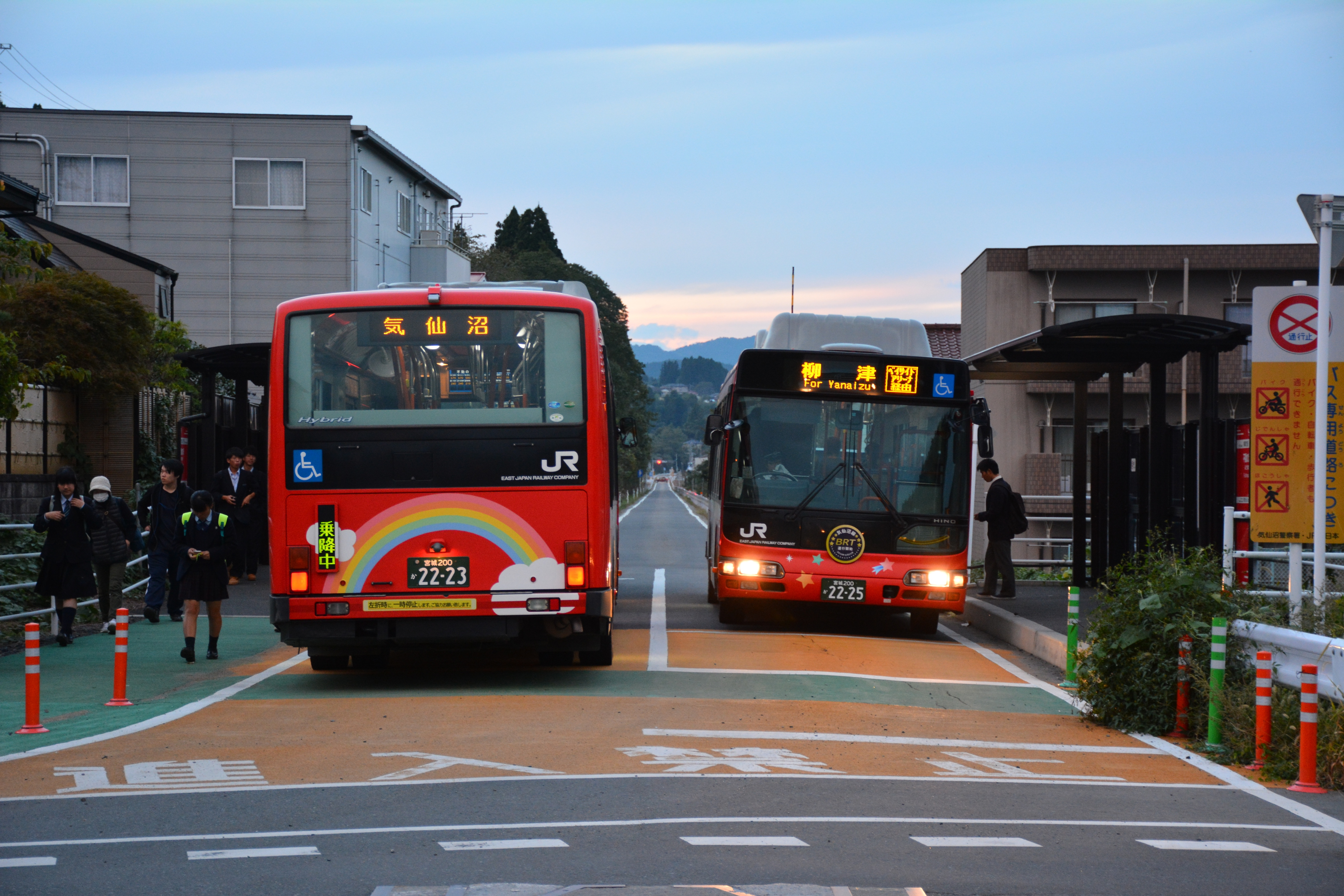
Modern Bus rapid transit (BRT) corridors, such as this one on the former Kesennuma Line, replaced low-density rail lines to provide more flexible and reliable regional transit.

Following the 1999 deregulation of the Railway Business Act, JR companies were able to streamline unprofitable routes with the agreement of local governments. In areas affected by natural disasters, such as the Tōhoku coast after the 2011 earthquake, JR East successfully replaced damaged rail lines with modern, high-speed BRT corridors. This modern approach provided more frequent, flexible, and cost-effective transportation for regional communities.

=== Management disparities among JR companies ===
To support the transition of the three regional companies operating in the less populated island regions (Hokkaido, Shikoku, and Kyushu), the government established a Management Stabilization Fund. While low interest rates in the post-bubble era reduced the fund's investment yields, this challenge encouraged regional operators to innovate and diversify.

Notably, JR Kyushu successfully expanded into non-railway sectors, including real estate and hospitality, achieving a successful listing on the Tokyo Stock Exchange in 2016. The success of the Honshu companies and JR Kyushu proved that private management and business diversification could secure the viability of regional passenger rail.

== Legacy and influence ==
The successful privatization of JNR served as a highly influential blueprint for subsequent public sector reforms in Japan, including the privatization of the Japan Highway Public Corporation and the postal system, Japan Post.

== See also ==
- Japanese National Railway Settlement Corporation
- JNR dismissal lawsuit
- Privatisation of British Rail
- Single European Railway Directive 2012
