= JNR dismissal lawsuit =

The JNR dismissal lawsuit is a lawsuit that resulted from the privatization of Japanese National Railways (JNR) in 1987, and its breakup into the seven Japan Railways Group companies. In March 1990, 1,047 mostly union workers were laid off, 966 of whom were from the National Railway Workers' Union (Kokuro), and two decades of lawsuits followed. The dispute was eventually settled in June 2010 for 20 billion yen (approximately US$225,155,500), or about 22 million yen (approximately US$250,000) per worker for 904 plaintiffs.

== Background ==
=== Plans for privatization ===
JNR, organized as a public corporation in 1949, had become unprofitable over subsequent decades. In the 1980s the Liberal Democratic Party government of prime minister Yasuhiro Nakasone decided to privatize the organization. Around this time other government bodies were also either wholly or partially privatized, such as Japan Tobacco and NTT in 1985.

=== Unionization of JNR workers ===
The 326,000 workforce of JNR was highly unionized, with workers represented by a number of unions. By far the largest union was the National Railway Workers' Union (Kokuro), with 200,000 members. National Railway Motive Power Union (Doro), which had split off from Kokuro in 1951, had 38,000 members. Zendoro, which had been expelled from Doro in 1974, had 3,000 members. Doro-Chiba, which broke off from Doro in 1979, had 1,100 members.

=== November 28, 1985 strike ===
Doro-Chiba staged a 24-hour strike on November 28, 1985, to protest against the plans to privatize JNR and lay off workers. The government strongly condemned the strike, as government workers in Japan are forbidden to strike. In addition there were a number of acts of sabotage and vandalism that stranded 10 million commuters in Tokyo and 200,000 in Osaka. The 24-hour strike caused 135 trains between Tokyo and Chiba prefecture to be cancelled, and JNR's management decided to fire more than 100 workers for staging the illegal walkout.

=== Middle Core Faction November 28, 1985 sabotage ===
In addition to the Doro-Chiba strike, a substantial amount of sabotage was done by the then-1,300 member strong radical leftist group Middle Core Faction, who claimed responsibility and said their actions were to support Doro-Chiba's strike. Communications lines were cut, fires were set at 27 locations in seven prefectures, and heavy damage was done to Asakusabashi Station in Tokyo around 7 a.m. by masked figures wearing helmets and throwing firebombs. No injuries were reported. Police raided offices of the Middle Core Faction and Doro-Chiba, and damage to bullet trail lines near Hiroshima that delayed trains between Tokyo and Kyushu appeared to have been caused by a time bomb and by noon 48 people were arrested, including leaders of the Middle Core Faction. Representatives of the larger Kokuro and Zendoro unions representing JNR workers condemned the "anti-social" attacks and apologized to commuters. According to sources inside the labor movement, Doro-Chiba was controlled by the Middle Core Faction.

Doro-Chiba Union Chairman Hiroshi Nakano later issued a statement saying that: "The attacks have nothing to do with the union." Of the 48 suspects arrested, 46 were from the Middle Core Faction and two were from the National Railway Workers' Union. Two of the suspects were later released.

=== Layoffs ===
JNR unions were opposed to the privatization, and when it occurred, around 7,600 workers were not rehired by the privatized companies. Many of these were members of the National Railway Workers' Union (Kokuro), now affiliated to the National Trade Union Council (Zenrokyo), and the National Railway Locomotive Engineers' Union (Zendoro), now affiliated to the National Confederation of Trade Unions (Zenroren) as part of the All Japan Construction, Transport and General Workers' Union (Kenkoro-Tetsudo Honbu). There was substantial pressure on union members to leave their unions, and within a year, Kokuro's membership fell from 200,000 to 44,000. Workers who had supported the privatization, or those who left Kokuro, were hired at substantially higher rates than Kokuro members.

There was a government pledge that no one would be "Thrown out onto the street", so unhired workers were classified as "needing to be employed" and were transferred to the JNR Settlement Corporation, where they could be assigned for up to three years.

Around 7,600 workers were transferred in this way, and around 2,000 of them were hired by JR firms, and 3,000 found work elsewhere. Mitomu Yamaguchi, a former JNR employee from Tosu in Saga prefecture who had been transferred to the JNR Settlement Corporation, later stated that their help in finding work consisted of giving him photocopies of recruitment ads from newspapers.

This period ended in April 1990, and 1,047 were dismissed. This included 64 Zendoro members and 966 Kokuro members. There were also 12 Doro-Chiba members who were not hired by the new companies, the reason given being that they had participated in the November 1985 strike.

== Legal, administrative, and political campaign for rehiring ==
=== Labor Commission cases ===
In 1987, the Central Labor Relations Commission in Tokyo ruled that the JR Group had to either rehire or compensate workers who were not hired when JNR was privatized. The Labor Commission ruled that it was an Unfair Labor Practice as the members of Kokuro had been targeted, and anti-union discrimination is illegal under article seven of Japan's Trade Union Act. It also ruled that the JR Group companies, not the defunct JNR, were responsible.

A group of 23 petitions filed after 1991 alleged that 1,800 union members in six prefectures had been discriminated against in violation of article seven of the Trade Union Act of 1949. Local labor relations commissions recognized discrimination in three prefectures, (Kanagawa, Tokyo, and Akita) and an order for redress was issued. The company appealed this to the Central Labour Relations Commission in Tokyo. The Central Labour Relations Commission brokered a deal, and in 2005, Kokuro withdrew the 23 cases claiming anti-union discrimination against its members. In return, the company paid compensation estimated at 360 million yen.

From 1987 to 2006, Kokuro filed 340 complaints with various labor relations commissions, mostly related to the dismissal of the 1,047 JNR workers. In November 2006 the union and JR East struck an agreement to settle 61 related to discrimination against union members employed by JR. Kokuro agreed to withdraw the labor commission cases, and JR East agreed to pay compensation. This was considered to be a major step forward in reconciling Kokuro to JR.

=== Lawsuits ===
The post-privatization dismissals resulted in a number of lawsuits. In 1994 and 1995, six JR Group companies brought lawsuits in the Tokyo District Court over the 1987 Labor Relations Commission ruling that the JR group was responsible for the non-hiring and that unfair labor practices had been committed. On May 28, 1998, rulings were handed down. In the case bought by the Honshu carriers, presiding Judge Saburo Takase said that while JR companies were responsible for selecting personnel to start up their new entities, they were not obligated to compensate unhired JNR workers. He said that if there were unfair labor practices were committed in choosing employees, the JR companies are responsible, but the labor commission should only order the firms to repeat their employment process, not to rehire the workers. He said an order to rehire unionists was illegal.

Presiding Judge Yasushige Hagio, ruling on the Hokkaido and Kyushu carriers' case, said that the JR Group companies were not responsible for personnel decisions following the JNR privatization, so he nullified the commission's order.

The Central Labor Relations Commission appealed and in December 2003, the Supreme Court rejected an appeal requesting that the former JNR employees in the labor unions that opposed the JNR privatization in 1987 be hired by the private Japan Railway companies that succeeded JNR.

The first petty bench of the Supreme Court gave a split decision. Presiding Justice Takehisa Fukazawa and Justice Niro Shimada said the JR firms bear this responsibility as employers and said the case should be sent back to the Tokyo High Court. However, the three other justices disagreed and stated that JR bore no responsibility for any unfair labor practices that may have been committed.

In another case, of 283 plaintiffs in September 2005, the Tokyo District Court ruled that JNR had discriminated against union employees when recruiting for positions at the new JR companies. It was the first time a court had recognized unfair labor practices by the now-defunct JNR or its affiliates and ordered compensation over the JR firms' refusal to hire JNR employees. Presiding judge Koichi Nanba ruled that the Japan Railway Construction, Transport and Technology Agency should pay ¥5 million to each of the plaintiffs. Despite ruling that they had been discriminated against, he didn't order their re-hiring, stating that "There were reasonable causes for dismissal."

On December 5, 2006, at the Tokyo District Court, more than 500 Kokuro members, the union itself, and relatives of workers who died since the privatization planned to launch a 30 million yen damages lawsuit over the refusal to rehire the workers, making a total of 540 plaintiffs suing the Japan Railway Construction, Transport and Technology Agency. Kokuro sought compensation for the loss of union fees incurred when the JR companies did not hire the union members, but this was intended as leverage to encourage political parties to intervene and for the agency to settle the labor dispute. A Kokuro official stated: "This suit is for securing an option to solve problems through the court before the statute of limitations expires. We will consider dropping the suit when a political solution becomes feasible."

On March 13, 2008, the Tokyo District Court turned down a case filed by 32 union members and three relatives of a deceased member which had been filed in November 2004. Judge Shigeru Nakanishi said the statute of limitations had expired, regardless of whether or not unfair labor practices had occurred. He did not state an opinion on whether or not such discrimination had occurred.

=== First attempted political settlement ===
In 2000, the ruling political bloc at the time (the Liberal Democratic Party, New Komeito, and the now-defunct New Conservative Party) suggested a compromise where the lawsuits would be dropped in return for urging the JR groups to rehire the workers in return for Kokuro acknowledging that JR had no responsibility for originally failing to employ them. The opposition Social Democratic Party functioned as an intermediary between the union and the ruling parties. the Social Democratic Party is affiliated to the National Trade Union Council (Zenrokyo), the trade union confederation that Kokuro belongs to. In January 2001, Kokuro voted to accept the plan, but there were various factions within the union with different viewpoints. In 2002, with the ruling block threatening to withdraw the deal, Kokuro voted again to withdraw their lawsuits.

In November 2002, the three ruling parties withdrew from the agreement. Kokuro had agreed to it but did not expel members who refused to accept it and had launched a separate lawsuit against the JNR Settlement Corporation in January 2002.

=== International Labour Organization view ===
Kokuro and Zendoro bought the case to the International Labour Organization, claiming anti-union discrimination and that this violated the right to organize as stipulated in the ILO Convention No. 98 concerning freedom of association. They brought the case to the ILO Committee on the Freedom of Association for settlement. The committee wrote a report which was then approved by the ILO's ruling body. The ILO's view was that the dismissed workers "were not hired by the JR companies not because of discrimination against the labor unions but because their members had refused wide-area transfers to other regions."

=== Towards a final settlement ===
After the 2009 election victory of the Democratic Party of Japan, the government coalition including the DPJ, Social Democratic Party and Kokumin Shinto plus the opposition party New Komeito drafted a settlement package. In the settlement plan the former JR workers were to receive ¥29.5 million each.

An attached document described the dismissal of the 1047 former JNR workers as "an unfair labor practice on an unprecedented scale." The proposed settlement package included a ¥28 billion financial component, and a request for the JR companies to hire around 230 former JNR workers aged up to 55.

In April 2010, then-transport minister Seiji Maehara, announced that he and then-deputy prime minister Naoto Kan and Chief Cabinet Secretary Hirofumi Hirano finalized plans for a settlement. The JR group companies were reluctant to rehire the workers, so that part of the settlement was abandoned. The political parties had proposed ¥24 million yen per worker, the government had proposed ¥20 million. The figure was settled at ¥22 million. The total settlement amount was reduced to ¥20 billion, to be divided into payments of ¥22 million each for 910 households of "reconciliation money," making a total of ¥14.2 billion. Kokuro and other bodies were to receive ¥5.8 billion to be used to help the former workers find work.

== Settlement ==
=== Settlement details ===
23 years after the original privatization, on June 28, 2010, the Supreme Court settled the dispute between the workers and the Japan Railway Construction, Transport and Technology Agency. The agency said it would pay 20 billion yen, approximately 22 million yen per worker, to 904 plaintiffs. However, as the workers were not reinstated, it was not a full settlement.

Pursuant to Paragraph 1 of the settlement, Kokuro and Kenkoro (Zendoro) dropped all its lawsuits, including unfair labor practice litigation not directly related to the firing of the 1,047 workers. Pursuant to Paragraph 2 of the settlement, Kokuro and Kenkoro did not file any unfair labor practice lawsuit thereafter.

=== Doro-Chiba's rejection of settlement ===
Doro-Chiba is a union which in 1979 split off from Doro (the National Railway Motor Power Union). Doro merged with Tetsuro, a company union which had split off from Kokuro decades ago, and formed JR-Soren (Japan Confederation of Railway Workers' Unions—JRU) and actively promoted the privatization of JNR. Doro-Chiba had nine members who were not employed by JR after the privatization in 1987 and the union refused to accept the 2010 settlement. The union vowed to continue the struggle against the dismissals and against the privatization of JNR.
