= Private railway =

Railway run by a private business entity

A private railway is a railroad run by a private business entity (usually a corporation but not need be), as opposed to a railroad run by a public sector.

== Japan ==
=== Etymology ===
In Japan, railway operators are traditionally classified into three sectors:

- First-sector railways: This group includes all government-operated enterprises, such as the former Japanese National Railways (JNR).
  - All six of the Japan Railways Group (JR) of companies have each been converted to a Japanese joint-stock company (株式会社, kabushiki gaisha (KK); lit. 'share company'). Further, 4 of the 6 JR companies have been subsequently privatized and listed as publicly traded companies. Despite this restructuring, they are generally classified as "first-sector" given they are successor companies to the former government-owned JNR.
- Second-sector railways: This group includes all private sector railway companies (私鉄 or 民鉄, Shitetsu or Mintetsu; a.k.a. private railway) operating a public transit railway. Private railways are almost always organized as a KK, but may be any type of private business entity. While structured as a private corporation, these private corporations may still include government shareholders.
  - For example, the Osaka Metro operator Osaka Metro Co., Ltd was privatized on April 1, 2018, but is still 100% owned by the Osaka Municipal Government.
- Third-sector railways: This group includes all railways operated by corporations jointly financed by public and private interests, and often have a prior history of full government ownership.
  - For example, the Aoimori Railway Company operates the Aoimori Railway Line, a privatization of former JR East track along the Tōhoku Main Line. The Aoimori Railway Company is majority owned by Aomori Prefecture, with minority ownership stakes by both other levels of government and private sector investors.

=== The "major 16" private operators ===
Among private railways in Japan, the Japan Private Railway Association categorizes 16 companies as "major" operators. The "major 16" include:

- Kantō region
  - Keikyu Corporation
  - Keio Corporation
  - Keisei Electric Railway
  - Odakyu Electric Railway
  - Sagami Railway (Sōtetsu)
  - Seibu Railway
  - Tobu Railway
  - Tokyo Metro
  - Tokyu Corporation
- Chūbu region
  - Nagoya Railroad (Meitetsu)
- Kinki region
  - Hankyu Corporation
  - Hanshin Electric Railway
  - Keihan Electric Railway
  - Kintetsu Railway (operates primarily in the Kinki region, with service to Nagoya in Chūbu)
  - Nankai Electric Railway
- Kyūshū region
  - Nishi-Nippon Railroad (Nishitetsu)

They are often profitable and tend to be less expensive per passenger-kilometer than JR trains that also run less dense regional routes. Private railways corporations in Japan also run and generate profits from a variety of other businesses that depend on the traffic generated through their transit systems: hotels, department stores, supermarkets, resorts, and real estate development and leasing.

=== Regulations ===
Japanese railways, whether government run, semi-public, or private business, are subject to the regulations enforced by the Railway Bureau of the Ministry of Land, Infrastructure, Transport and Tourism. They may join unions such as National Railway Workers' Union and General Federation of Private Railway and Bus Workers' Unions of Japan, but their abilities to call a strike is severely limited by government legislation; there is very little tolerance for railway work stoppage. Employees of private railways may legally strike but it’s unheard of in Japan. There have only been two notable railroad strikes in Japanese history, both by employees of government run entities (government employees are legally barred from striking): One in 1973, and a major strike protesting the breakup (and layoffs of tens of thousands of employees) of JNR in 1985.

Though private railways such as industrial railways have existed in Japan they are not deemed shitetsu nor mintetsu in Japanese, as their purpose is not public transit.

Tokyo Metro is a member of Japan Private Railway Association but is under special laws and its stock is owned by the Japanese Government and the Tokyo Metropolitan Government (pending privatization). The Japan Private Railway Association counts Tokyo Metro as one of the 16 major private railways.

== United States ==
In the United States, a private railroad is a railroad owned by a company and serves only that company, and does not hold itself out as a "common carrier" (i.e., it does not provide rail transport services for the general public).

== See also ==
- Industrial railway
- Railway nationalization
- National Rail (UK)
