= MARS (ticket reservation system) =

Electronic ticketing system used by JR Group, Japan

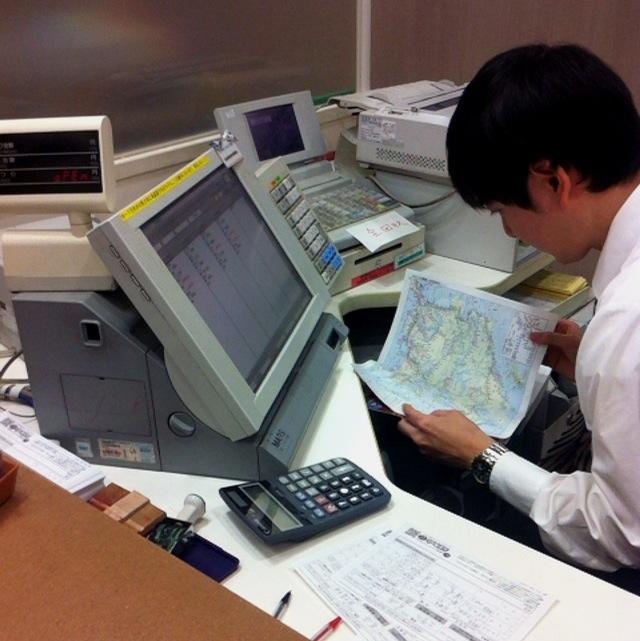
A MR32-type MARS terminal at a JR ticket office in 2015

MARS (Japanese: マルス, Hepburn: Marusu) is the train ticket reservation system used by the Japan Railways Group (JR Group) companies and travel agencies in Japan. It was developed jointly by Hitachi Rail and the former Japanese National Railways (JNR), and was later inherited by Railway Information Systems (JR Systems), which is jointly owned by the seven JR Group companies. Staffed station ticket offices equipped with MARS terminals are known as Midori no Madoguchi (みどりの窓口; lit. 'Green Window').

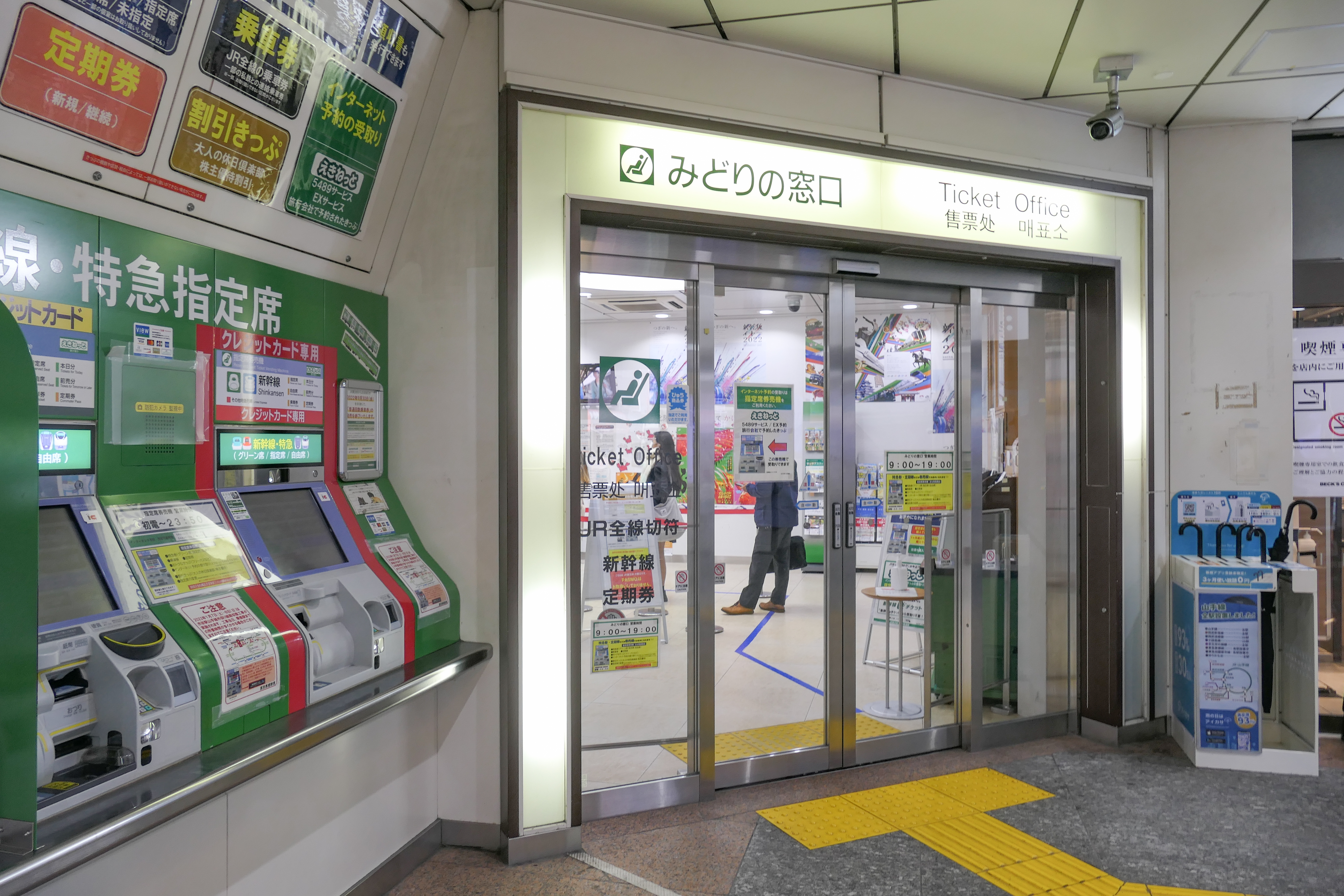
A Midori no Madoguchi ticket office at Takadanobaba Station in 2022

Originally an acronym for Magnetic-electronic Automatic Reservation System, the name was later reinterpreted as Multi Access Reservation System, before being reverted to its original meaning.

MARS is Japan's largest online real-time reservation network, providing year-round availability of 99.999%. While the system was originally created for ticket sales and seat reservations for trains, it has since expanded to cover a range of services, including reservations for express buses, hotels, rental cars, and ferries; sales of tickets for amusement parks and exhibitions; and fare calculations for base-fare tickets, commuter passes, and express tickets.

The system currently consists of about 10,000 terminals at JR ticket offices and travel agencies, in addition to ticket vending machines and the online systems operated by the individual JR companies. It is accessed about eight million times daily, with an average of more than 1.9 million tickets sold per day.

== Outline ==
The host computer for MARS was originally located in Kokubunji, Tokyo, until 2013, when it was relocated to an undisclosed site in the northern Kantō region. Management of the system has been handled by JR Systems since 1 April 1987, following the division and privatization of JNR. In 2025, MARS received recognition as an IEEE Milestone.

JR station ticket offices equipped with MARS terminals are known as Midori no Madoguchi, selling tickets for all JR Group trains as well as selected bus routes and ferries. Passengers can reserve train and bus tickets up to one month in advance. In the JR Central region, these offices are instead referred to as kippu uriba (きっぷうりば; lit. 'ticket sales counter').

== History ==
=== MARS-1 ===
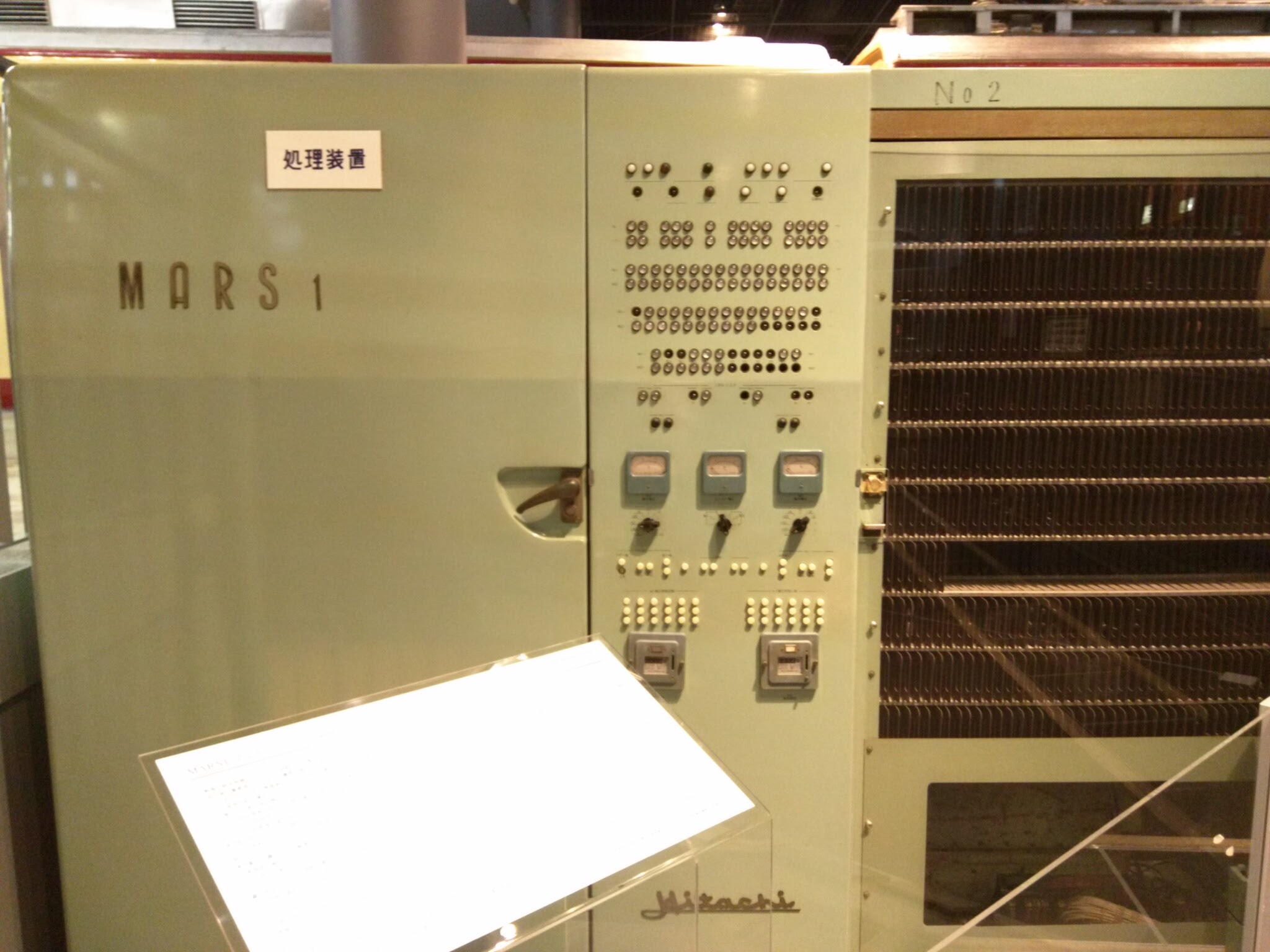
Preserved MARS-1 mainframe at Railway Museum, Saitama

The MARS-1 system was created by Mamoru Hosaka, Yutaka Ohno, and others at the Japanese National Railways' R&D Institute (now the Railway Technical Research Institute), and was built in 1958. It was the world's first seat reservation system for trains, and entered service in February 1960, initially only providing bookings for the Kodama and Tsubame limited express services. The MARS-1 was capable of reserving seat positions, and was controlled by a Hitachi mainframe transistor computer with a central processing unit consisting of a thousand transistors and a magnetic drum memory unit for data storage, which was where the MARS acronym originated from.

In 2008, the MARS-1 system received a "One Step on Electro Technology -Look Back to the Future-" commemorative plaque from the Institute of Electrical Engineers of Japan.

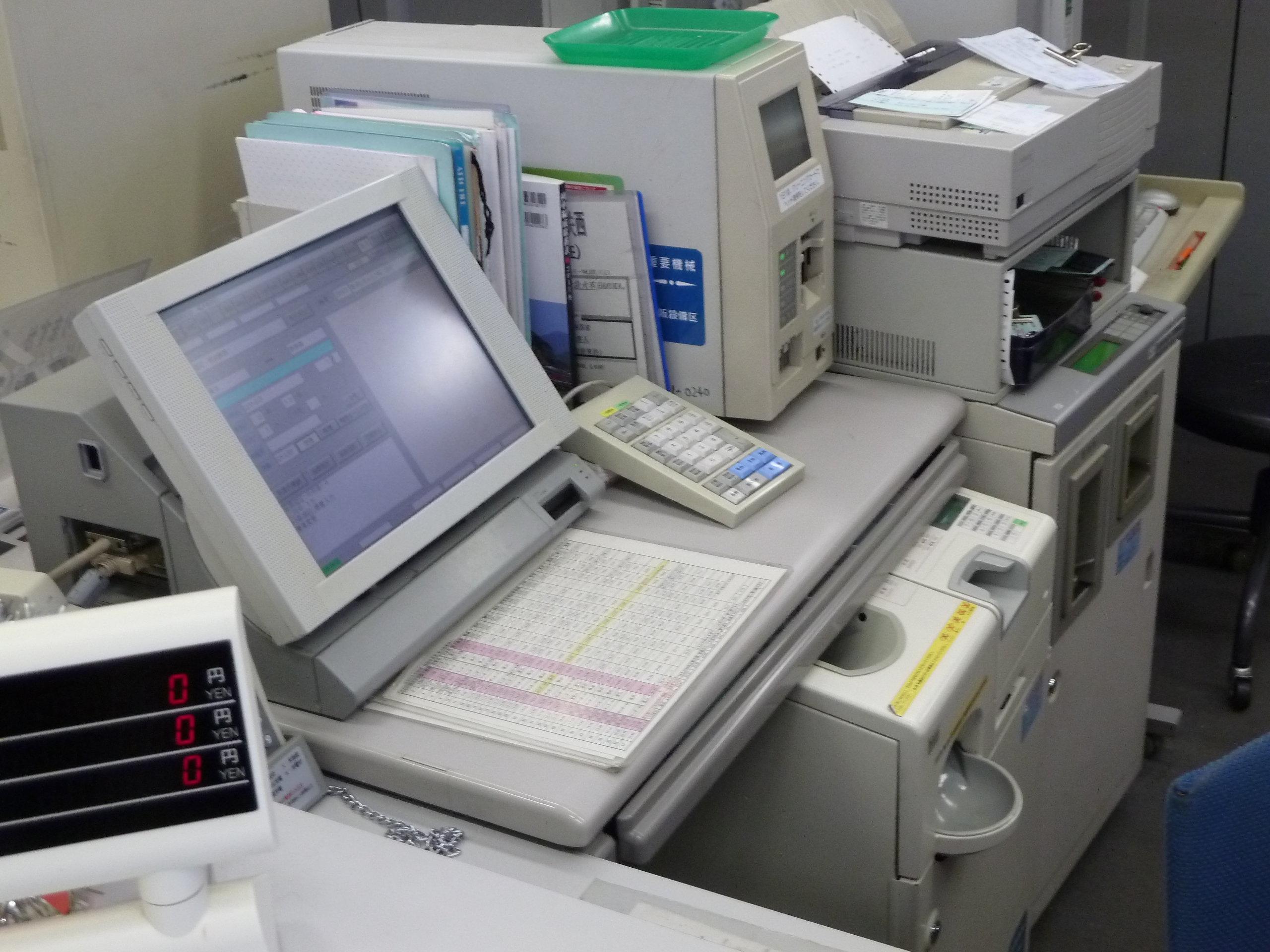
MR12W-type touchscreen terminal computer with thermal paper printer

=== MARS 500 ===
==== MARS 501 ====
Introduced in stages between 2002 and 2004, the MARS 501 introduced the concept of an Ethernet-based client–server model. Also, the ticket paper type was changed to thermal paper.

==== MARS 505 ====
The latest version of MARS uses the MARS 505 system which was introduced in April 2020, which expanded on contactless, and ticketless boarding and booking capabilities brought along by the rise of mobile apps on smartphones and tablets.
