= Japanese Federation of National Railway Workers' Unions =

Trade union in Japan

The Japanese Federation of National Railway Workers' Unions (Japanese: 新国鉄労働組合連合, Shinkokuro) was a trade union representing workers on the Japanese National Railways.

The union was founded in 1962, with the merger of the Federation of National Railway Workers' Unions by Crafts and the General Federation of National Railway Workers' Unions, both of which originated from the dissolution of the National Railway Workers' Union. It became affiliated with the All-Japan Trade Union Congress, and then with its successor, the Japanese Confederation of Labour. By 1967, it had 74,755 members.

On 20 October 1968, the federation's various affiliates unified, to form the Japan Railway Workers' Union.
