= Railway Information Systems =

Japan Railways group information technology company

Railway Information Systems Co., Ltd.
- Native name: 鉄道情報システム株式会社
- Romanized name: Tetsudō Jōhō Shisutemu Kabushiki Gaisha
- Type: Joint venture
- Industry: Information technology
- Predecessor: Japanese National Railways (JNR)
- Founded: 9 December 1986; 39 years ago
- Headquarters: 2-2-2 Yoyogi, Shibuya, Tokyo, Japan
- Key people: Hirotaka Honda (Chairman); Takayuki Ikeda (President)
- Revenue: ¥35.4 billion (JFY2024)
- Operating income: ¥1.2 billion (JFY2024)
- Net income: ¥1 billion (JFY2024)
- Total assets: ¥41.6 billion (JFY2024)
- Total equity: ¥14.6 billion (JFY2024)
- Owner: JR Central (21.8%); JR East; JR Freight; JR Hokkaido; JR Kyushu; JR Shikoku; JR West (24.1%)
- Number of employees: 720 (as of July 2025)
- Website: www.jrs.co.jp/english
- Footnotes; Financials as of Japanese fiscal year (JFY) ended 31 March 2025. References

Railway Information Systems Co., Ltd. (Japanese: 鉄道情報システム株式会社, Hepburn: Tetsudō Jōhō Shisutemu Kabushiki Gaisha) is a Japanese information and communications technology company. It is commonly known as JR Systems (JRシステム, Jei-Āru Shisutemu), and its corporate color is maroon.

On 1 April 1987, the company succeeded to the operation and management of computer systems—including the MARS ticket reservation system—from the Japanese National Railways (JNR), and became part of the Japan Railways Group (JR Group). Its head office is located in Shibuya, Tokyo, inside the JR East headquarters building.

The company's core business is the development, operation, and management of information systems for the JR Group companies, including the MARS system used at Midori no Madoguchi (ticket offices) and ticket vending machines. The company is a joint venture owned by the six passenger rail companies of the JR Group and the Japan Freight Railway Company (JR Freight).

== Business overview ==
JR Systems' core business is the development, operation, and management of information systems for the JR Group. Its primary system, MARS, is Japan's largest real-time online reservation network, originally created for train ticket sales and seat reservations but now also supporting express bus, hotel, rental car, and ferry bookings; amusement park and exhibition tickets; and fare calculations for base-fare tickets, commuter passes, and express tickets. MARS can be accessed via staff-operated terminals at Midori no Madoguchi ticket offices, web-based portals, and ticket vending machines. The company's Revenue Settlement System allocates and settles passenger revenue among JR companies.

Other systems include IT-FRENS & TRACE, the core container freight management system at JR Freight and Raku-Tsū With (らく通with; lit. 'Easy-Communication With'), a hotel terminal for managing reservations from travel agencies and online booking sites.

It also operates JR-NET, a nationwide optical fiber communications network that underpins MARS and CYBER STATION, an internet service provider using JR-NET.

The company also provides IT consulting and system solutions for hotel operations, workforce shift management, planning, vehicle allocation, delivery routing, and cloud-based services, many adapted from its internal systems.

== History ==
As the Japanese government prepared to divide and privatize the Japanese National Railways (JNR), it established the provisionally named System Company (システム会社, Shisutemu-gaisha) on 9 December 1986, along with a Railway Telecommunication company (which later became SoftBank Telecom and is now part of SoftBank). These companies were created to take over the JNR Information Systems Department, the Central Information Systems Management Center, the Tokyo Systems Development Construction Bureau, the Kunitachi Systems Construction Office, the Passenger Department Central Sales Center, and the information divisions of certain railway management bureaus. On 12 December 1986, it was designated as a successor corporation of JNR by the Minister of Transport. Following the division and privatization of JNR on 1 April 1987, the company commenced operations.

The company was established several months earlier than the six JR passenger companies and JR Freight, which were formally established on 1 April 1987, because prior procedures were required to transfer operations from JNR. At the time of its establishment, the company had 280 employees and inherited assets with a book value of ¥17 billion. It also assumed ¥17 billion in debt in the form of private borrowings carried over from JNR. In its early years, it handled EPOCS (エポックス, Epokkusu), a system for managing JR Freight containers, and FOCS (フォックス, Fokkusu), a system for managing wagonload freight.

In April 1992, the company released the first MARS terminal update since privatization, the MR-2. In February 1993, it introduced the first customer-operated MARS terminal, the MV-1 ticket vending machine. On 1 June 1997, it launched the internet service provider "CYBER STATION". In October 2002, the MARS 501 system was placed into operation. In April 2020, the MARS 505 system entered operation.
