= Japan Railways Group =

Group of companies that replaced Japanese National Railways

- Industry: Rail transport
- Predecessor: Japan National Railways
- Founded: 1 April 1987; 39 years ago
- Subsidiaries: See list of companies

JR Group service regions

The Japan Railways Group, commonly known as the JR Group (Jei Āru Gurūpu) or simply JR, is a network of railway companies in Japan formed after the division and privatization of the government-owned Japanese National Railways (JNR) on 1 April 1987. The group comprises six regional passenger railway companies, one freight railway company, and two non-service entities. The JNR Settlement Corporation assumed much of the debt of the former JNR.

The companies of the JR Group operates a significant portion of Japan’s rail services, including intercity routes, commuter lines, and the Shinkansen high-speed rail network.

JR Hokkaido, JR Shikoku, and JR Freight (JRF) are governed by the Act for the Passenger Railway Companies and Japan Freight Railway Company, also known as the JR Companies Act, and are overseen by the public Japan Railway Construction, Transport, and Technology Agency (JRTT). In contrast, JR East, JR Central, JR West, and JR Kyushu are fully privatized and publicly traded.

Due to JR’s origins as a government-run entity, Japanese rail users often distinguish JR lines (including some now operated by third-sector entities) from other private railways. This distinction is typically reflected in the way JR and other private railways are labeled on maps.

== Background ==
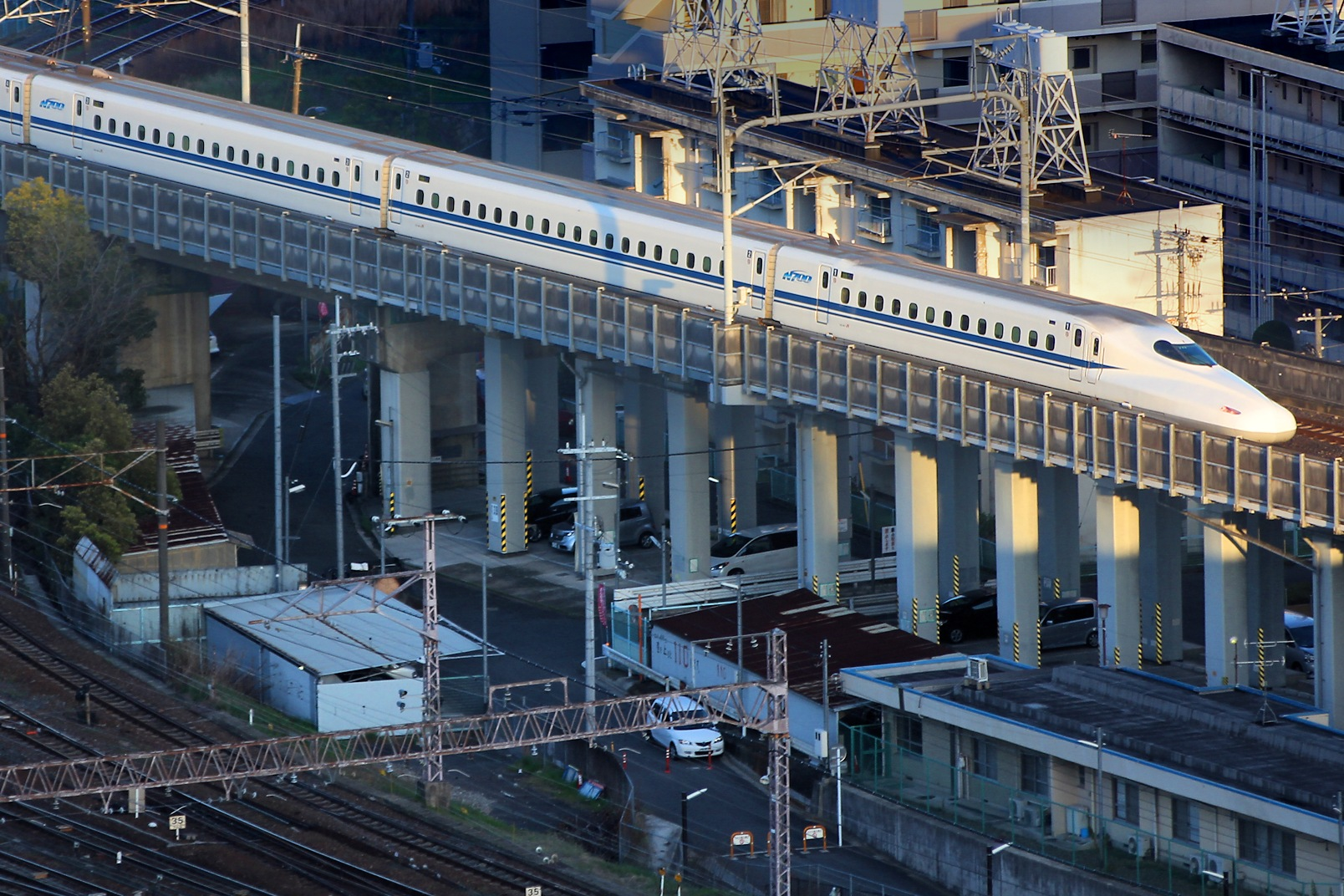
JR Central Tōkaidō Shinkansen arriving at Kyoto Station

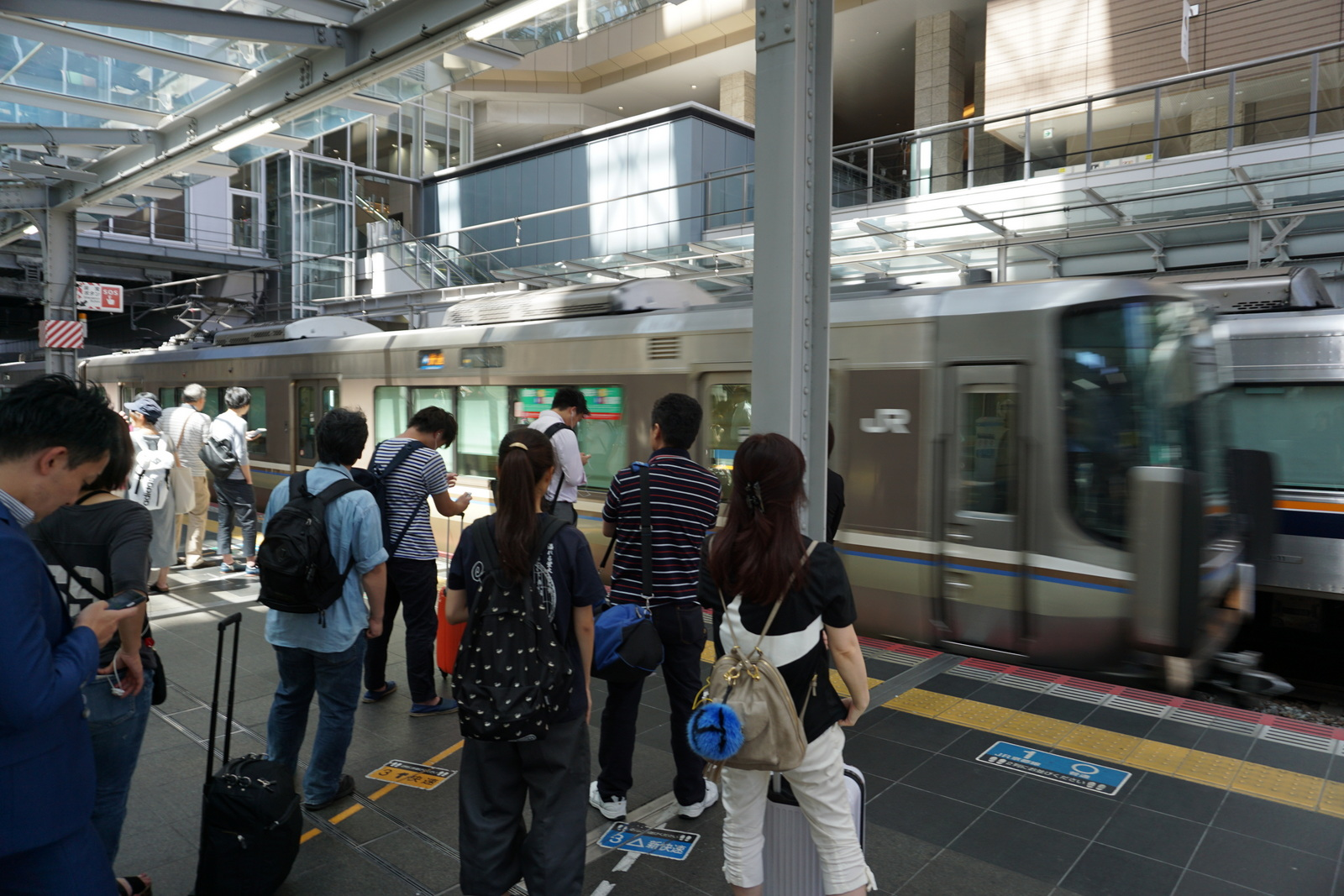
A JR West 223 series train arriving in Osaka station

The COVID-19 pandemic in Japan abruptly reduced passenger railway ridership in 2020, which has been increasing since 1960.

By the 1970s, passenger and freight business had declined, and fare increases had failed to keep up with higher labor costs.

The JR Group companies were formed out of the privatization of the Japanese National Railways in 1987.

The seven JR companies recorded a total profit of ¥ 88.9 million in 1988.

== Ownership ==
In 1987, the government of Japan took steps to divide and privatize JNR. While division of operations began in April of that year, privatization was not immediate: initially, the government retained ownership of the companies. Privatization of some of the companies began in the early 1990s. By October 2016, all of the shares of JR East, JR Central, JR West and JR Kyushu had been offered to the market and they are now publicly traded. On the other hand, all of the shares of JR Hokkaido, JR Shikoku and JR Freight are still owned by Japan Railway Construction, Transport and Technology Agency, an independent administrative institution of the state.

All the JR Group companies operating in the Honshū region are constituents of the Nikkei 225 and TOPIX 100 indexes.

== Companies ==
JR Group's main offices and branch offices:

Hokkaido East Central
West Shikoku Kyushu

(JR Freight, RTRI, and JR Systems are omitted)

The Japan Railways Group consists of seven operating companies and two non-operating companies. The operating companies include six passenger railways and a nationwide freight operator. Unlike some other corporate groups, the JR Group comprises independent companies and does not have a group headquarters or a holding company to set overall business policy.

The six passenger railways are organized by region, and most of their services operate within their designated areas. Some long-distance services, however, extend beyond regional boundaries. For example, the Shirasagi service between Nagoya and Kanazawa uses JR West rolling stock, but the section of track between Nagoya and Maibara is owned by JR Central, whose crew operate the train on that segment.

Japan Freight Railway Company operates all freight services on the network formerly owned by JNR.

The group also includes two non-operating companies: the Railway Technical Research Institute (RTRI) and Railway Information Systems (JR Systems).

Business	Logo and color	Company	Type	Fully privatized	Traded as	Region(s) of operation	Note
Passenger	Hokkaido	Hokkaido Railway Company (JR Hokkaido)	State-owned via JRTT	—N/a	—N/a	Hokkaidō	Operates Hokkaidō Shinkansen
Passenger	East	East Japan Railway Company (JR East)	Public	2002	TYO: 9020	Tōhoku, Kantō, Hokuriku, Kōshin'etsu	Operates Akita, Hokuriku (with JR West), Jōetsu, Tōhoku and Yamagata Shinkansen
Passenger	Central	Central Japan Railway Company (JR Central)	Public	2006	TYO: 9022; NAG: 9022	Chūbu	Operates Tōkaidō Shinkansen
Passenger	West	West Japan Railway Company (JR West)	Public	2004	TYO: 9021	Hokuriku, Kansai, Chūgoku, Kyūshū	Operates Hokuriku (with JR East) and San'yō Shinkansen
Passenger	Shikoku	Shikoku Railway Company (JR Shikoku)	State-owned via JRTT	—N/a	—N/a	Shikoku	
Passenger	Kyushu	Kyushu Railway Company (JR Kyushu)	Public	2016	TYO: 9142; FSE: 9142	Kyūshū	Operates Kyūshū and Nishi Kyūshū Shinkansen
Freight	Freight	Japan Freight Railway Company (JR Freight)	State-owned via JRTT	—N/a	—N/a	Nationwide	
IT Services		Railway Information Systems (JR Systems)	Joint venture	—N/a	—N/a	Nationwide	Develops, operates and manages computer systems, including MARS (ticket reservation system). Jointly owned by the railway operating companies.
Research & Development		Railway Technical Research Institute (RTRI)	Non-profit foundation	—N/a	—N/a	Nationwide	Conducts research and development of railway-related technologies, such as SCMaglev. Non-profit organization funded by the railway operating companies.

== Network ==
JR maintains a nationwide railway network as well as common ticketing rules that it inherited from JNR. Passengers may travel across several JR companies without changing trains and without purchasing separate tickets. However, trains running across the boundaries of JR companies have been reduced.

JR maintains the same ticketing rules based on the JNR rules and has an integrated reservation system known as MARS (jointly developed with Hitachi). Some types of tickets (passes), such as Japan Rail Pass and Seishun 18 Ticket, are issued as "valid for all JR lines" and accepted by all passenger JR companies.

== Unions ==
Various unions represent workers at the different JR Group companies, such as the National Railway Workers' Union, All Japan Construction, Transport and General Workers' Union, Doro-Chiba, and the Japan Confederation of Railway Workers' Unions.

== See also ==
- Rail transport in Japan
- List of railway companies in Japan
- Japan Railways locomotive numbering and classification
- SoftBank Telecom – former Japan Telecom, an affiliated company of JNR established in 1984
