= National Railway Locomotive Engineers' Union =

- Kokutetsu dōryokusha rōdōkumiai
- Successor: Japan Confederation of Railway Workers' Unions
- Founded: 1951
- Dissolved: 2 February 1987
- Location: Japan
- Members: 61,650 (1970)
- Affiliations: General Council of Trade Unions of Japan

The National Railway Locomotive Engineers' Union (国鉄動力車労働組合, Kokutetsu dōryokusha rōdōkumiai) was a Japanese trade union, which was usually referred to as Dōrō (動労) in Japanese.

== History ==
=== Foundation to 1980 ===
Dōrō (National Railway Locomotive Engineers' Union) split from the National Railway Workers' Union (Kokuro) in 1951. It was considered to be more left-leaning. Dōrō was a major union, along with Kokuro, representing workers who worked for Japanese National Railways (JNR). In the late 1960s, managers at the Japanese National Railways tried to pressurise members to defect to the more moderate Japan Railway Workers' Union (Tetsuro), but this was largely unsuccessful and instead led the union to become more militant.

In 1974, the Dōrō national leadership expelled several branches in Hokkaido area that had not supported Dōrō's political campaign for the Socialist Party' National Parliament candidates. Expelled branches formed the All Japan National Railway Locomotive Engineers' Union (Zendōrō).

In 1979 the Chiba prefecture chapter of the union split off to form an independent union, which became known as Dōrō-Chiba. Dōrō-Chiba split off after its executive committee members had been expelled by Dōrō national leadership because of their support for the struggle of farmers in Chiba Prefecture against the operation and expansion of Narita International Airport.

=== JNR privatization ===
When privatization of JNR was proposed in the mid-1980s, JNR's unions including Dōrō were strongly opposed and campaigned against it. Dōrō, however, actively supported the privatization plan. JNR was privatized in 1987, and replaced by the Japan Railways Group (JR Group). As of 1985 Dōrō had 38,000 members.

Lists of workers to be employed by the new organizations were drawn up by JNR and given to the JR companies. There was substantial pressure on union members to leave their unions, and within a year, Kokuro's membership fell from 200,000 to 44,000. Workers who had supported the privatization, or those who left Kokuro, were hired at substantially higher rates than members of Kokurō, Zenōrō and Dōrō-Chiba.

In February 1987, the union merged with Tetsuro and other right wing unions to form the Japan Confederation of Railway Workers' Unions.

== JNR dismissal lawsuit ==
=== Dismissals ===
There was a government pledge that no one would be "Thrown out onto the street", so unhired workers were classified as "needing to be employed" and were transferred to the JNR Settlement Corporation, where they could be assigned for up to three years.

Around 7,600 workers were transferred in this way, and around 2,000 of them were hired by JR firms, and 3,000 found work elsewhere. Mitomu Yamaguchi, a former JNR employee from Tosu in Saga prefecture who had been transferred to the JNR Settlement Corporation, later stated that their help in finding work consisted of giving him photocopies of recruitment ads from newspapers.

This period ended in April 1990, and 1,047 were dismissed. This included 64 Zendōrō members and 966 Kokuro members.

=== Settlement ===
Many lawsuits and labor commission cases were filed over the decades from the privatization in 1987. 23 years after the original privatization, on June 28, 2010, the Supreme Court settled the dispute between the workers and the Japan Railway Construction, Transport and Technology Agency, the successor body to the JNR Settlement Corporation. The agency said it would pay 20 billion yen, approximately 22 million yen per worker, to 904 plaintiffs. However, as the workers were not reinstated, it was not a full settlement.
