= Japan Railway Construction Public Corporation =

Japanese public corporation responsible for railway construction

Japan Railway Construction Public Corporation (日本鉄道建設公団, Nihon Tetsudō Kensetsu Kōdan) (JRCC) was a public corporation responsible for the construction of railway lines in Japan.

The JRCC was established in 1964 as the successor to JNR's railway line construction division. Kakuei Tanaka, then an influential member of the House of Representatives, was said to have been involved in its creation. Since by 1964 the existing railway network had been largely completed, the JRCC's primary responsibility was the planning and construction of the new Shinkansen lines, urban railway lines, and third-sector lines.

The opening of the Tōkaidō Shinkansen and Seikan Tunnel and the planning of the Honshu-Shikoku Bridge Project all proved beneficial to JRCC's bottom line. However, in spite of debate over JNR's plan to eliminate little-used local lines and become profitable again, JRCC was forced to build new local lines in response to pressure from Diet politicians. Ultimately construction of new lines continued to ensure "balanced development of the nation."

In September 1979, it was revealed that JRCC had used money intended for overtime and other expenses for personal vacations, and it became the target of the Board of Audit of Japan. As a result, six people (including the director, Hiromori Kawashima) were forced to step down and 352 had their salary reduced, received warnings, or were otherwise reprimanded. A special accounting committee was also formed to return the mis-spent funds and pay taxes as was deemed necessary.

In 1998 JRCC assumed the assets and liabilities of the Japanese National Railway Settlement Corporation (JNRSC); JNRSC's existing long-term debts were incorporated into the national government's general debt. The JRCC was dissolved on October 1, 2003 and its responsibilities were passed to the Japan Railway Construction, Transport and Technology Agency (JRTT).
