= Japan Railway Workers' Union =

Trade union in Japan

The Japan Railway Workers' Union (Japanese: 鉄道労働組合, Tetsuro) was a trade union representing workers on the Japanese National Railways (JNR).

The union was founded on 20 October 1968, with the merger of the various affiliates of the Japanese Federation of National Railway Workers' Unions. Like that federation, it affiliated to the Japanese Confederation of Labour, and by 1970, it had 73,064 members. The union was considered to be on the right wing of the movement, opposing political activism and working closely with management. Initially, managers at JNR attempted to pressurise members of rival unions to join the more compliant Tetsuro, but this was largely unsuccessful and led the other unions to become more militant.

In response to the privatisation of JNR, on 2 February 1987, Tetsuro merged with the National Railway Locomotive Engineers' Union (Doro), to form the Japan Confederation of Railway Workers' Unions. Many former members of Tetsuro split away in 1992, to form the Japan Railway Trade Unions Confederation.
