= All Japan Day Workers' Union =

Trade union in Japan

The All-Japan Day Workers' Union (Japanese: 建設一般全日自劳, Zennichijiro) was a trade union representing construction workers on daily contracts in Japan.

The union was founded in 1947 and was a founding affiliate of the General Council of Trade Unions of Japan. It initially represented all construction workers, but the craft workers' section of the union split away in 1952. By 1967, the union had 158,728 members. It was a founding affiliate of Zenroren in 1989.

In 1991, the union absorbed the National Federation of Rural Labor Unions, becoming known as the Construction and Rural and General Workers' Union. In 1999, it merged with the All Japan Transport and General Workers' Union and the All Japan National Railway Locomotive Engineers' Union, to form the All Japan Construction, Transport and General Workers' Union.
