= All Japan National Railway Locomotive Engineers' Union =

Trade union in Japan

The All Japan National Railway Locomotive Engineers' Union (Japanese: 全国鉄動力車労働組合, Zendōrō) was a trade union representing railway workers in Japan.

The union's origins lay in the National Railway Locomotive Engineers' Union (Dōrō). In 1973, Dōrō's leadership called for votes for the Socialist Party of Japan, but a minority group preferred to back the Communist Party of Japan (KPJ). This group was expelled, and in 1974 founded Zendoro. By 1975, the new union had 3,500 members, but this steadily declined, and by 1990, membership was down to only 1,401. It remained unaffiliated until 1989, when it joined the new National Confederation of Trade Unions. In 1999, it merged with the Construction and Rural and General Workers' Union and the All Japan Transport and General Workers' Union, to form the All Japan Construction, Transport and General Workers' Union.
