= Transit privatization =

To move transit from government to corporate control

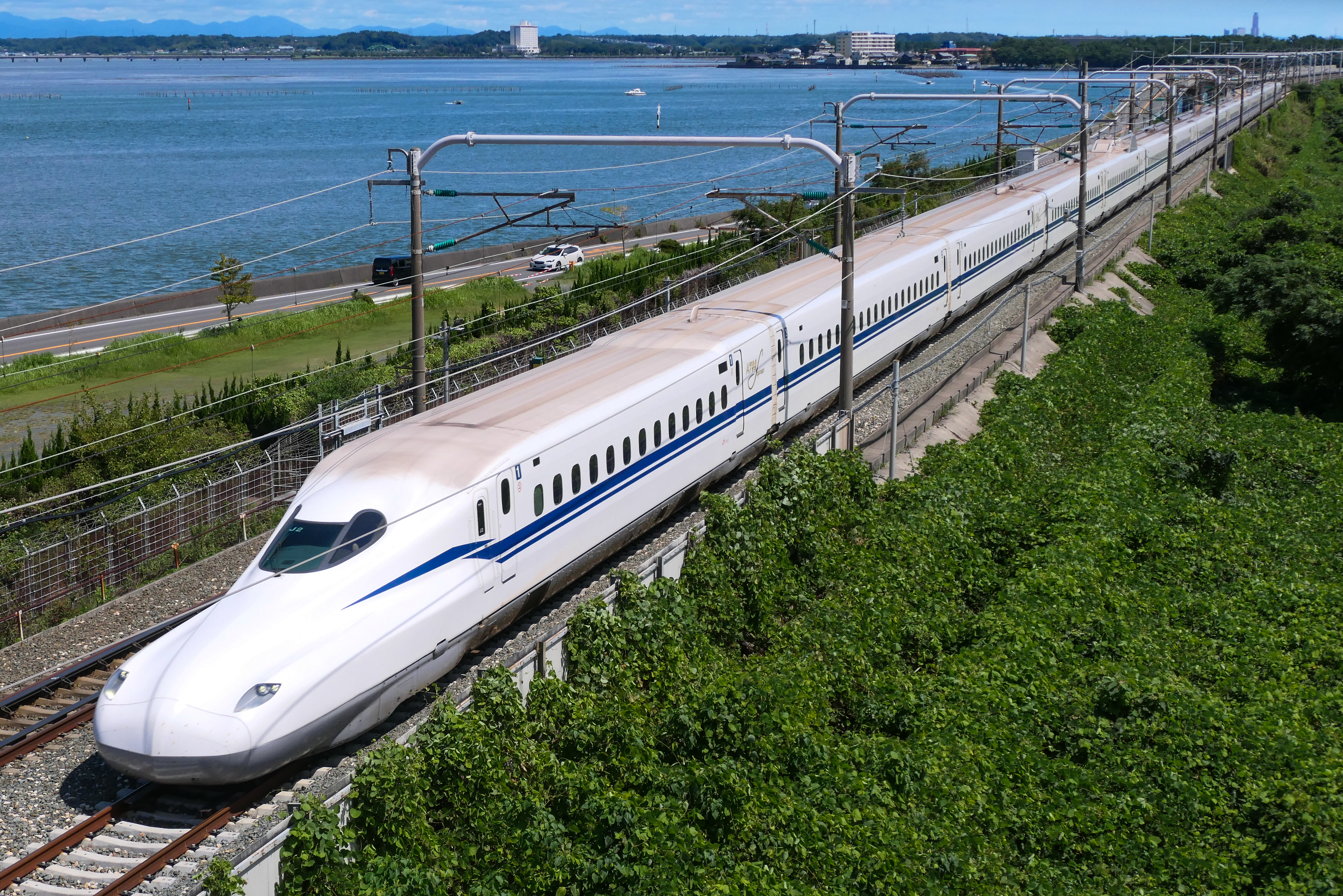
A Japanese Shinkansen train. Japan's rail system was privatized in 1989

Transit privatization is the process of shifting the provider of public transportation from governments to privately held companies. It became common during the 1980s and 1990s as a result of rising costs and bureaucracy, and declines in service quality. Privatization efforts have had mixed results, typically achieving the goal of reducing public debt and expenditure, however often resulting in reduced service and financial issues.

== See also ==
- Deregulation
- Staggers Rail Act (act that deregulated rail in the US)
- Privatisation of British Rail
- Division and privatization of Japanese National Railways
- Bus deregulation in Great Britain
- Airline deregulation
- Railway nationalisation
