= All Japan Transport and General Workers' Union =

Trade union in Japan

The All Japan Transport and General Workers' Union (Japanese: 全日本運輸一般労働組合, Unyuippan) was a trade union representing workers in the transport sector in Japan.

The union was established in 1946 as the National Trade Union of Automobile Transport Workers (Zenjiun), with a focus on truck drivers, and was affiliated with the General Council of Trade Unions of Japan (Sohyo). By 1958, it had 12,655 members. It became Unyuippan in 1977, and by 1985 its membership had grown to 16,267.

In 1989, Sohyo merged with the new Japanese Trade Union Confederation, but Unyuippan instead opted to join the new National Confederation of Trade Unions. In 1999, it merged with the Construction and Rural and General Workers' Union and the All Japan National Railway Locomotive Engineers' Union, to form the All Japan Construction, Transport and General Workers' Union.
