= National Railway Chiba Motive Power Union =

Japanese trade union

Doro-Chiba
- Kokutetsu-chiba-dōryokusha-rōdōkumiai
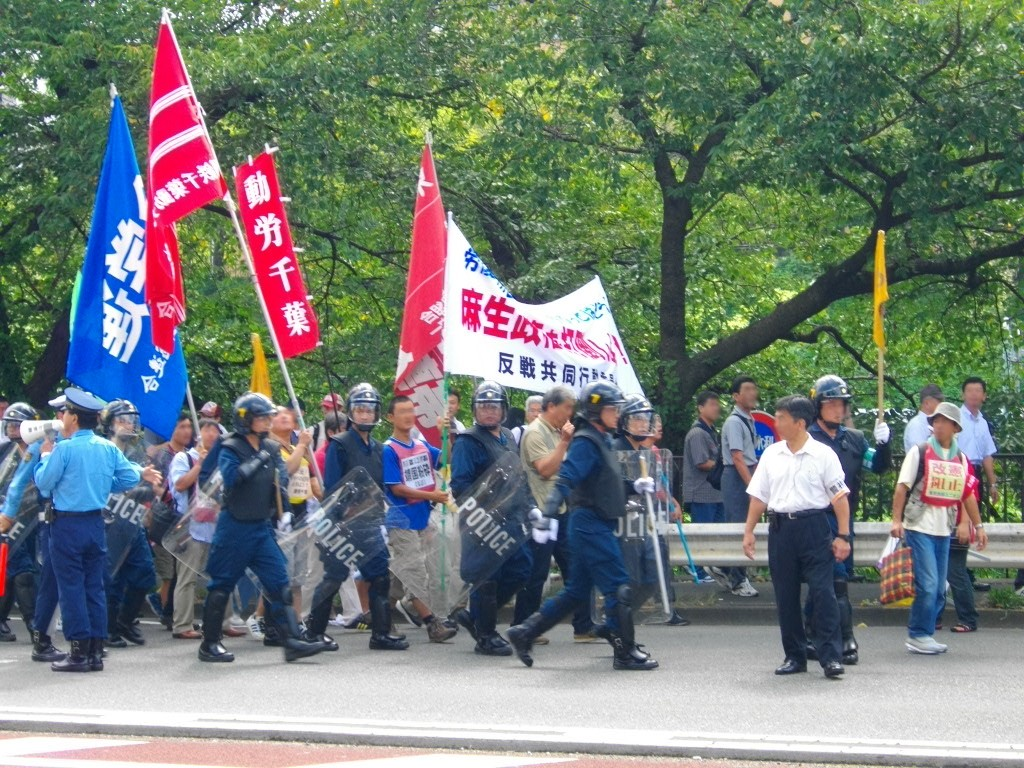
- Founded: March 30, 1979
- Location: Japan
- Website: www.doro-chiba.org

National Railway Chiba Motive Power Union (国鉄千葉動力車労働組合, Kokutetsu-chiba-dōryokusha-rōdōkumiai) is a Japanese trade union, which is usually referred to as Doro-Chiba (動労千葉, Dōrō-chiba). It has also been referred to as the Chiba Motormen's Union in English. It split from the National Railway Motive Power Union (Doro) in 1979.

== History ==
=== Doro founding ===
Doro split from the National Railway Workers' Union (Kokuro) in 1951, and was considered to be more left-leaning. It was a major union, along with Kokuro, representing workers who worked for Japanese National Railways (JNR).

=== Doro-Chiba split from Doro ===
In 1979, the Chiba Prefecture chapter of Doro split off to form an independent union, which became known as Doro-Chiba. It split off after its executive committee members had been expelled from Doro because of their support for Sanrizuka-Shibayama Union to Oppose the Airport.

=== November 28, 1985 strike ===
As of 1985, the union had 1,100 members, and on November 28, 1985, it staged a strike to protest against the plans of the Prime Minister Yasuhiro Nakasone's government to privatize JNR and lay off workers. The government strongly condemned the strike, as government workers in Japan are forbidden to strike. In addition there were a number of acts of sabotage and vandalism that stranded 10 million commuters in Tokyo and 200,000 in Osaka. The 24-hour strike caused 135 trains between Tokyo and Chiba prefecture to be cancelled, and JNR's management decided to fire more than 100 workers for staging the illegal walkout.

=== Middle Core Faction November 28, 1985 sabotage ===
In addition to the Doro-Chiba strike, a substantial amount of sabotage was done by the then-1,300 member strong radical leftist group Middle Core Faction, who claimed responsibility and said their actions were to support Doro-Chiba's strike. Communications lines were cut, fires were set at 27 locations in seven prefectures, and heavy damage was done to Asakusabashi Station in Tokyo around 7 a.m. by masked figures wearing helmets and throwing firebombs. No injuries were reported. Police raided offices of the Middle Core Faction and Doro-Chiba, and damage to bullet trail lines near Hiroshima that delayed trains between Tokyo and Kyushu appeared to have been caused by a time bomb and by noon 48 people were arrested, including leaders of the Middle Core Faction. Representatives of the larger Kokuro and Doro unions representing JNR workers condemned the "anti-social" attacks and apologized to commuters. According to sources inside the labor movement, Doro-Chiba was controlled by the Middle Core Faction.

Doro-Chiba Union Chairman Hiroshi Nakano later issued a statement saying that: "The attacks have nothing to do with the union." Of the 48 suspects arrested, 46 were from the Middle Core Faction and two were from the National Railway Workers' Union. Two of the suspects were later released.

=== Doro-Chiba rejection of JNR settlement ===
After JNR was privatized in 1987, 1,047 workers were laid off. Unions including Kokuro, Zendoro, and Doro-Chiba waged a two-decade struggle for reinstatement of the workers. A ¥20 billion settlement was eventually paid in 2010 to 904 plaintiffs, but without the workers being reinstated.

Doro-Chiba had nine members who were not employed by JR after the privatization in 1987 and the union refused to accept the 2010 settlement. It vowed to continue the struggle against the dismissals and against the privatization of JNR.
