= Railway Technical Research Institute =

Railway research institute in Japan

Railway Technical Research Institute 財団法人鉄道総合技術研究所
- Abbreviation: RTRI
- Formation: 10 December 1986; 39 years ago
- Legal status: Public Interest Incorporated Foundation
- Purpose: Railway technology research and consulting
- Headquarters: 2-8-38, Hikaricho, Kokubunji-shi, Tokyo
- Region served: Japan
- Leader: Masao Mukaidono (chair)
- Affiliations: Japan Railways Group
- Budget: ¥15.3 billion (FY 2009)
- Staff: 512 (as of 1 October 2008)
- Website: rtri.or.jp

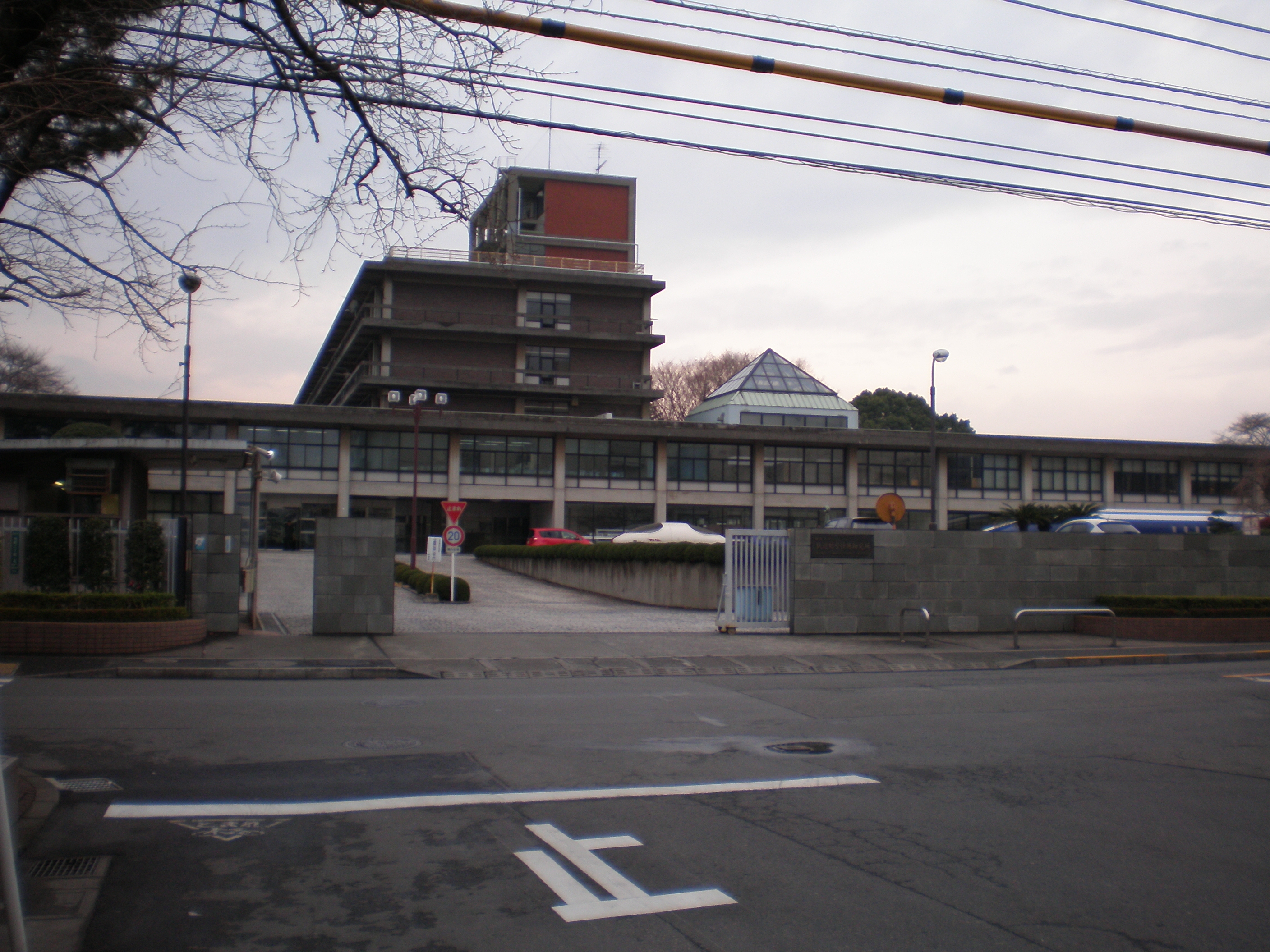
Railway Technical Research Institute in Kokubunji, Tokyo

Railway Technical Research Institute (鉄道総合技術研究所, Tetsudō Sōgō Gijutsu Kenkyūsho), or RTRI (鉄道総研, Tetsudō Sōken), is the technical research company under the Japan Railways group of companies.

== Overview ==
RTRI was established in its current form in 1986 just before Japanese National Railways (JNR) was privatised and split into separate JR group companies. It conducts research on everything related to trains, railways and their operation. It is funded by the government and private rail companies. It works both on developing new railway technology, such as magnetic levitation, and on improving the safety and economy of current technology.

Its research areas include earthquake detection and alarm systems, obstacle detection on level crossings, improving adhesion between train wheels and tracks, reducing energy usage, noise barriers and preventing vibrations.

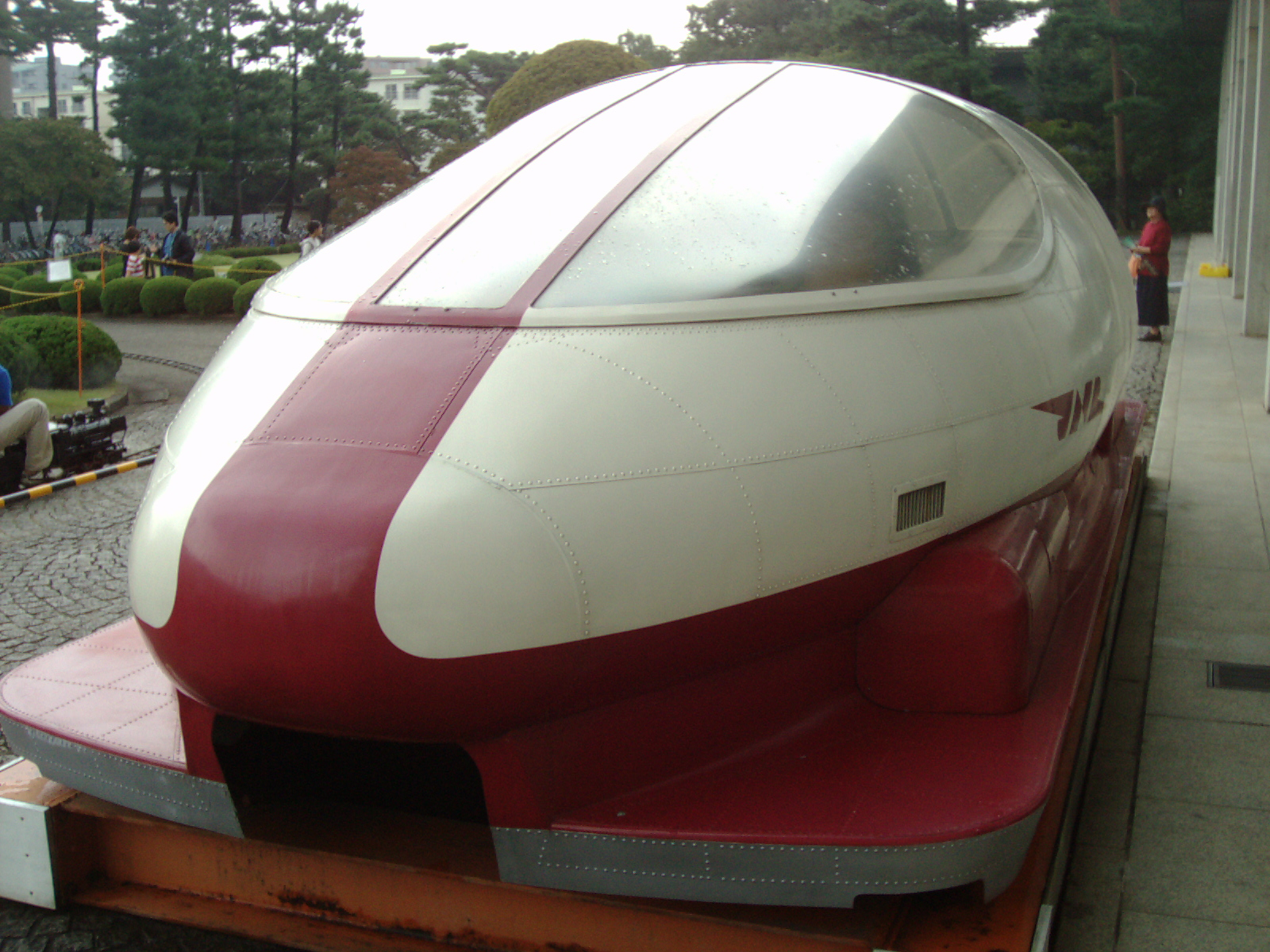
JR's first experimental magnetic levitation train, ML100, on display outside RTRI

RTRI is the main developer in the Japanese SCMaglev program.

== Offices and test facilities ==
RTRI
Research facilities Office

=== Main office ===
- 844 Shin-Kokusai Bldg. – 3-4-1 Marunouchi, Chiyoda, Tokyo

=== Research facilities ===
- Kunitachi Institute – 2-8-38 Hikari-cho, Kokubunji, Tokyo
- Wind Tunnel Technical Center – Maibara, Shiga
- Shiozawa Snow Testing Station – Minami-Uonuma, Niigata
- Hino Civil Engineering Testing Station – Hino, Tokyo
- Gatsugi Anti-Salt Testing Station – Sanpoku, Niigata

== Gauge Change Train ==
The RTRI is developing a variable gauge system, called the "Gauge Change Train", to allow 1,435 mm (4 ft 8 1/2 in) Shinkansen trains to access 1,067 mm (3 ft 6 in) lines of the original rail network.

== Publications ==
- Japan Railway & Technical Review
- Quarterly Report of RTRI - Print: ISSN 0033-9008 Online: ISSN 1880-1765

== See also ==
- British Rail Research Division
- German Centre for Rail Traffic Research
- Hydrail
