= Japan Railway Trade Unions Confederation =

Trade union in Japan

The Japan Railway Trade Unions Confederation (JRTU; Japanese: 日本鉄道労働組合連合会, JR Rengo) is a trade union representing workers at the Japan Railways Group.

The union was founded on 18 May 1992 by former members of the Japan Railway Workers' Union who left the recently founded Japan Confederation of Railway Workers' Unions, on the grounds that they were opposed to it considering the possibility of strike action. It was promoted by the Japan Railways Group, and by September it had 74,900 members. It became affiliated with the Japanese Trade Union Confederation. As of 2020, the union had 74,602 members.
