= SoftBank Telecom =

Japanese telephone company

SoftBank Telecom Corporation
- Native name: ソフトバンクテレコム株式会社
- Formerly: Japanese Telecom Telegraph (1984-2002); Japan Telecom Co. Ltd. (2002-2006)
- Type: Subsidiary
- Industry: Telecommunications
- Founded: October 1984; 41 years ago
- Defunct: April 1, 2015
- Fate: Merged into sister company Softbank Mobile Corp. (50% economic, 50% voting)
- Parent: SoftBank

SoftBank Telecom Corporation (Japanese: ソフトバンクテレコム株式会社, Hepburn: Sofuto Banku Terekomu Kabushiki-gaisha) was a Japanese telephone company and part of the SoftBank group. It provided services to both businesses and consumers in Japan, including long-distance telephone service, international calling, and direct connection fixed-line voice service. The company also engaged in billing and fee collection for telephony services, consulting, development and establishment of telecommunication systems, as well as information processing and related services. On 1 April 2015, SoftBank Telecom Corporation merged into SoftBank Mobile Corporation and ceased to exist as a separate entity.

The company's history traces back to October 1984, when Japanese Telecom Telegraph was founded. In August 1986, it launched leased circuit services.

In December 1986, as the Japanese government prepared to divide and privatize the Japanese National Railways (JNR), it established a Railway Telecommunication company (JR Telecom) to take over telecommunications related systems owned by JNR. Following the division and privatization of JNR on 1 April 1987, the company commenced operations.

In May 1989, Japanese Telecom Telegraph merged with JR Telecom. In August 2002, the company changed its name to Japan Telecom Holdings, separating its fixed-line telecommunications business to form a new Japan Telecom. The company was renamed SoftBank Telecom Corporation in October 2006. Following its merger into SoftBank Mobile Corporation in April 2015, the company effectively ceased operations under the SoftBank Telecom name. In December 2018, the company went public through an initial public offering.
