= Japan Confederation of Railway Workers' Unions =

Japan Confederation of Railway Workers' Unions (JRU)
- 全日本鉄道労働組合総連合会
- Founded: February 2, 1987
- Location: Japan
- Members: 22,561 (as of 2020)
- Affiliations: RENGO
- Website: jr-souren.com/en/

The Japan Confederation of Railway Workers' Unions (JRU) (全日本鉄道労働組合総連合会, Zen-nihon tetsudō-rōdō-kumiai) is a Japanese trade union, which is usually referred to as JR-Soren (JR総連) in Japanese.

== History ==
The union was founded on 2 February 1987, with the merger of the National Railway Locomotive Engineers' Union (Doro) and the Japan Railway Workers' Union (Tetsuro). The merger was in response to the privatisation of Japanese National Railways, of which both unions were broadly supportive. It affiliated to the Japanese Trade Union Confederation. In 1992, many former Tetsuro members split away, in protest at the union considering the possibility of strikes, and formed the rival Japan Railway Trade Unions Confederation. In 1996, the union had 70,710 members, but by 2020, this had fallen to only 22,561.

In 2010, a complaint was lodged in the Diet that JR-Soren was being financially controlled by the Japan Revolutionary Communist League (Revolutionary Marxist Faction). JR-Soren denied the charges. The charge was repeated by Kansei Nakano and confirmed by several weekly magazines.

== Composition ==
JR-Soren consists of 11 unions and has 62,300 members.

== Overseas activities ==
JR-Soren has assisted with construction of elementary schools in China, and in 2002, established an office in Kabul to support the people of Afghanistan.
