= National Railway Workers' Union =

Japanese trade union

- Kokutetsu-rōdō-kumiai
- Founded: 1946
- Location: Japan
- Members: 9,000 (as of 2016)
- Affiliations: National Trade Union Council
- Website: kokurohonbu.com

The National Railway Workers' Union (NRU) (国鉄労働組合, Kokutetsu-rōdō-kumiai) is a Japanese trade union, which is usually referred to as Kokurō (国労) in Japanese. Historically, Kokurō represented many of the workers who worked for Japanese National Railways (JNR), from which the union derived its name. For several decades in the postwar period, Kokurō was one of the most powerful unions in Japan, with a membership in the hundreds of thousands, before falling into decline. As of 2016, Kokurō had just 9,000 members.

== History ==
Kokurō was established in February 1946 in preparation for the establishment of the nationwide, state-run railway Japan National Railways (JNR), organizing more than 96% of JNR employees. Originally a confederation of local and regional unions, Kokurō was reorganized into a single organization in June 1946. In early 1946, the newly legalized Japan Communist Party sought to establish a rival labor movement to the more conservative Sōdōmei federation. To this end, it began to infiltrate the upper ranks of major labor unions, including Kokurō. In August 1946, Kokurō became one of the founding member unions of the new, JCP-backed Sanbetsu labor federation. In these early phases, the American Occupation authorities even encouraged the formation of Sanbetsu, believing it to be a necessary counterweight to Sōdōmei, which they viewed as having been too compliant with the militarist Japanese government's demands in the prewar period.

However, in the late 1940s, with advent of the global Cold War, Occupation authorities began to view the activities of the militant Sanbetsu-affiliated labor unions with increasing alarm. With the open encouragement of Occupation authorities, more conservative elements within the Sanbetsu-affiliated labor unions began to form “democracy cells” (mindō). The first of these mindō was formed within Kokurō, with other unions rapidly following suit and forming their own mindō thereafter. Amidst the collapse of Sanbetsu during the Red Purge of 1950, these mindō rose to the fore and merged with some elements of Sōdōmei to form the new Sōhyō labor federation, with Kokurō as a leading member.

In 1959, Kokurō's dissatisfaction with Sōhyō's seeming lack of militancy was a factor in driving Sōhyō's leadership to pursue an activist role in the massive 1960 Anpo protests against the U.S.-Japan Security Treaty. However, an Occupation-era law prohibiting public-sector unions such as Kokurō from carrying out strikes limited Kokurō's own militancy and forced it to rely on the broader Sōhyō federation (which including many private-sector unions as well) to advance its militant agenda. Kokurō finally tried to resolve this situation by carrying out a “Strike for the Right to Strike” (sutoken suto) in 1975, but the strike ended in failure and shattered the power of Kokurō, leading to a decline in membership and ending its days as an effective organizing force for labor militancy.

By the 1980s, Kokurō was a shadow of its former self. When the privatization of JNR was proposed in the mid-1980s, Kokurō was strongly opposed and campaigned against it, but to no avail. JNR was privatized in 1987, and replaced by the Japan Railways Group (JR Group). Lists of workers to be employed by the new organizations were drawn up by JNR and given to the JR companies. There was substantial pressure on union members to leave their unions, and within a year, Kokurō's membership fell from 200,000 to 44,000. Workers who had supported the privatization, or those who left Kokurō, were hired at substantially higher rates than Kokurō members. The main trade unions representing railway workers in Japan are now the Japan Railway Trade Unions Confederation and the Japan Confederation of Railway Workers' Unions.

== JNR dismissal lawsuit ==
=== Dismissals ===
Kokurō and the National Railway Locomotive Engineers' Union (Zendoro), both prominent Japanese railway unions, represented a number of the JNR workers. There was a government pledge that no one would be "Thrown out onto the street", so unhired workers were classified as "needing to be employed" and were transferred to the JNR Settlement Corporation, where they could be assigned for up to three years.

Around 7,600 workers were transferred in this way, and around 2,000 of them were hired by JR firms, and 3,000 found work elsewhere. Mitomu Yamaguchi, a former JNR employee from Tosu in Saga prefecture who had been transferred to the JNR Settlement Corporation, later stated that their help in finding work consisted of giving him photocopies of recruitment ads from newspapers.

This period ended in April 1990, and 1,047 were dismissed. This included 64 Zendoro members and 966 Kokurō members.

=== Settlement ===
Many lawsuits and labor commission cases were filed over the decades from the privatization in 1987. 23 years after the original privatization, on June 28, 2010, the Supreme Court settled the dispute between the workers and the Japan Railway Construction, Transport and Technology Agency, the successor body to the JNR Settlement Corporation. The agency said it would pay 20 billion yen, approximately 22 million yen per worker, to 904 plaintiffs. However, as the workers were not reinstated, it was not a full settlement.
