= All Japan Construction, Transport and General Workers' Union =

Trade union in Japan

- Japanese: 全日本建設交運一般労働組合, romanized: Zen-nihon kensetsukōun ippan rōdō-kumai
- Founded: 1999
- Headquarters: 4-7-2 Hyakunin-cho, Shinjuku, Tokyo 169-0073
- Location: Japan
- Members: 60,000
- Key people: Kenya Sakai (President)
- Affiliations: Zenroren
- Website: www.kenkourou.or.jp/topmenu/topmenu.php

The All Japan Construction, Transport and General Workers' Union (全日本建設交運一般労働組合, Zen-nihon kensetsukōun ippan rōdō-kumai) is a Japanese trade union group, which is usually referred to as Kenkōrō (建交労) in Japanese. It is affiliated to Zenroren (the National Confederation of Trade Unions), the second largest of Japan's three main trade union confederations.

== History ==
Kenkoro was established in 1999, with the merger of the Construction and Rural and General Workers' Union, the All Japan Transport and General Workers' Union, and the All Japan National Railway Locomotive Engineers' Union.
