= Japanese National Railway Settlement Corporation =

Holding company for privatisation of Japanese National Railways

The Japanese National Railway Settlement Corporation (日本国有鉄道清算事業団, Nihon Kokuyū Tetsudō Seisan Jigyōdan), or JNRSC, was a temporary holding company created to distribute the assets of the former Japanese National Railways (JNR) after its privatization in the mid-1980s. On October 22, 1998, the JNRSC was disbanded and placed under the Japan Railway Construction Public Corporation, JRCC, and its assets were transferred. Currently, the Japan Railway Construction, Transport and Technology Agency holds the liabilities and assets of the JNRSC.

The goal of disbanding the JNR was to privatize the newly created JR satellite companies, known collectively as the JR Group. Each of the seven companies was created as a kabushiki gaisha with the Japanese government as sole shareholder. Currently, JR East, JR West, JR Central and JR Kyushu are entirely privatized. JNRSC still holds titles to the remaining three JR Group companies, Hokkaido Railway Company (JR Hokkaido), Shikoku Railway Company (JR Shikoku), and the Japan Freight Railway Company (JR Freight).

== Debt ==
In 1987, when the privatization of Japanese National Railways took place, JNR debt totaled over ¥37 trillion. Upon passage of the 1987 Railway Reform Law, the debt of JNR was split, with 60% of the responsibility falling directly on the JNR Settlement Corporation, and 40% falling on three of the JR Group railway companies, JR East, JR Central, and JR West. While the smaller portion was expected to be repaid, the three JR Group railway companies were not held liable for failed earnings, and only made significant profit through sale of stock. JNR dignitaries staggered interest payments on the large existing debt to keep the JNRSC from paying back the debts that it was expected to. During its tenure, the debt increased, leaving taxpayers to pay off nearly ¥24 trillion as of 2009.

== Worker controversy ==
When JNR was disbanded, many workers were left without jobs. The National Railway Workers' Union (Kokuro), and Japan Railway Motive Power Union, both prominent Japanese railway unions, represented a number of the JNR workers. JNR-provided lists contained workers' names for hire at the seven JR Group railway companies. Members of Kokuro and the Japan Railway Motive Power Union were left off this list after being instructed to leave the union or face being laid off. After the restructuring, some 7,600 former JNR workers, mostly Kokuro members, were left without jobs. JNRSC, after acquiring many of them, proceeded to fire more than 1,000. This controversy was cited as example of unfair labor practice by a number of union commissions, and litigation was brought up to fight against the anti-labor acts of JNR and its JR Group successors.

On December 22, 2003, the Supreme Court of Japan ruled in favor of the JR Group companies, saying that unfair labor practices by JNR were not the responsibility of the JR Group companies, and as independently operating agencies, they were not legally obligated to hire back the dismissed workers. Litigation on the matter after 1998 rests on the Japan Railway Construction, Transport and Technology Agency, which now holds the majority sum of the JNRSC's liability and assets.

On June 28, 2010, 23 years after the original privatization, the Supreme Court settled the dispute between the workers and the Japan Railway Construction, Transport and Technology Agency, the successor body to the JNR Settlement Corporation. The agency said it would pay 20 billion yen, approximately 22 million yen per worker, to 904 plaintiffs. However, as the workers were not reinstated, it was not a full settlement.
