= Japan Railway Construction, Transport and Technology Agency =

Japanese railway construction public corporation

- Native name: 鉄道建設・運輸施設整備支援機構
- Company type: State-owned
- Industry: Transportation
- Predecessor: Japan Railway Construction Public Corporation; Corporation for Advanced Transport and Technology
- Founded: 1 October 2003; 22 years ago
- Subsidiaries: Hokkaido Railway Company; Japan Freight Railway Company; Shikoku Railway Company
- Website: www.jrtt.go.jp

The Japan Railway Construction, Transport and Technology Agency (Japanese: 鉄道建設・運輸施設整備支援機構, Hepburn: Tetsudō Kensetsu Un’yu Shisetsu Seibi Shien Kikō), or JRTT, is an independent administrative institution of the Japanese government. It is responsible for developing, constructing and supporting railway infrastructure and railway-related technology.

== History ==
The Japan Railway Construction, Transport and Technology Agency was established on 1 October 2003 by an act of the National Diet through the merger of two public corporations: the Japan Railway Construction Public Corporation (JRCC) and the Corporation for Advanced Transport and Technology (CATT).

The JRCC had been established in March 1964 to oversee the construction of Shinkansen and other railway lines. In October 1998, the Japanese National Railway Settlement Corporation was merged into JRCC, following the completion of its role in liquidating the remaining assets of Japanese National Railways (JNR) after its division and privatization in April 1987.

CATT was formed in October 1997 through the merger of the Maritime Credit Corporation, which managed joint-ownership shipbuilding projects, and the Railway Development Fund, which provided subsidies for railway construction. The Railway Development Fund itself had been established in October 1991 from the remnants of the Shinkansen Holding Corporation, which had been responsible for holding the ownership of Shinkansen lines still under construction at the time of JNR’s privatization. In March 2001, the Association for Structural Improvement of the Shipbuilding Industry was merged into CATT.

== Lines of business ==
As its name implies, JRTT is involved in construction and technical support for railway and other transportation projects throughout Japan. JRTT has undertaken numerous railway construction projects during its existence,

As its name suggests, the Japan Railway Construction, Transport and Technology Agency is engaged in the construction and technical support of railway and other transportation infrastructure projects throughout Japan. Since its establishment, JRTT has overseen or supported the construction of numerous major railway lines, including the Nagoya Municipal Subway Meijō Line (opened 2004), the Kyushu Shinkansen (2004), the Meitetsu Airport Line (2005), the Tsukuba Express (2005), the Osaka Higashi Line (2008), the Tokyo Metro Fukutoshin Line (2009), the Narita Sky Access Line (2010), and the Hokkaido Shinkansen (2016). More recently, JRTT completed the Eastern Kanagawa Rail Link, which opened in stages beginning in 2023. The agency is currently responsible for ongoing construction of Phase 2 of the Hokkaido Shinkansen.

JRTT owns the lines it constructs and leases access to their respective railway operators.

In addition to railway construction, JRTT supports maritime transportation and research activities, including sponsorship of vessels such as the current ship used by the JR Miyajima Ferry. The agency also performs administrative functions related to the liquidation of JNR, including management of pension obligations for former employees.

== Subsidiaries ==
JRTT serves as the parent organization of the companies within the JR Group that have not been fully privatized, including the Hokkaido Railway Company, the Shikoku Railway Company, and the Japan Freight Railway Company.

JRTT was previously the parent organization of the West Japan Railway Company, Central Japan Railway Company, and Kyushu Railway Company, before its shares were later offered to the public as part of their privatization processes.

Under legislation passed by the National Diet in 2011, JRTT is required to allocate retained earnings from its non-railway businesses toward Shinkansen construction projects and capital investment in its subsidiary railway companies.
