= ITF Seafarers' Trust =

UK charitable maritime trust

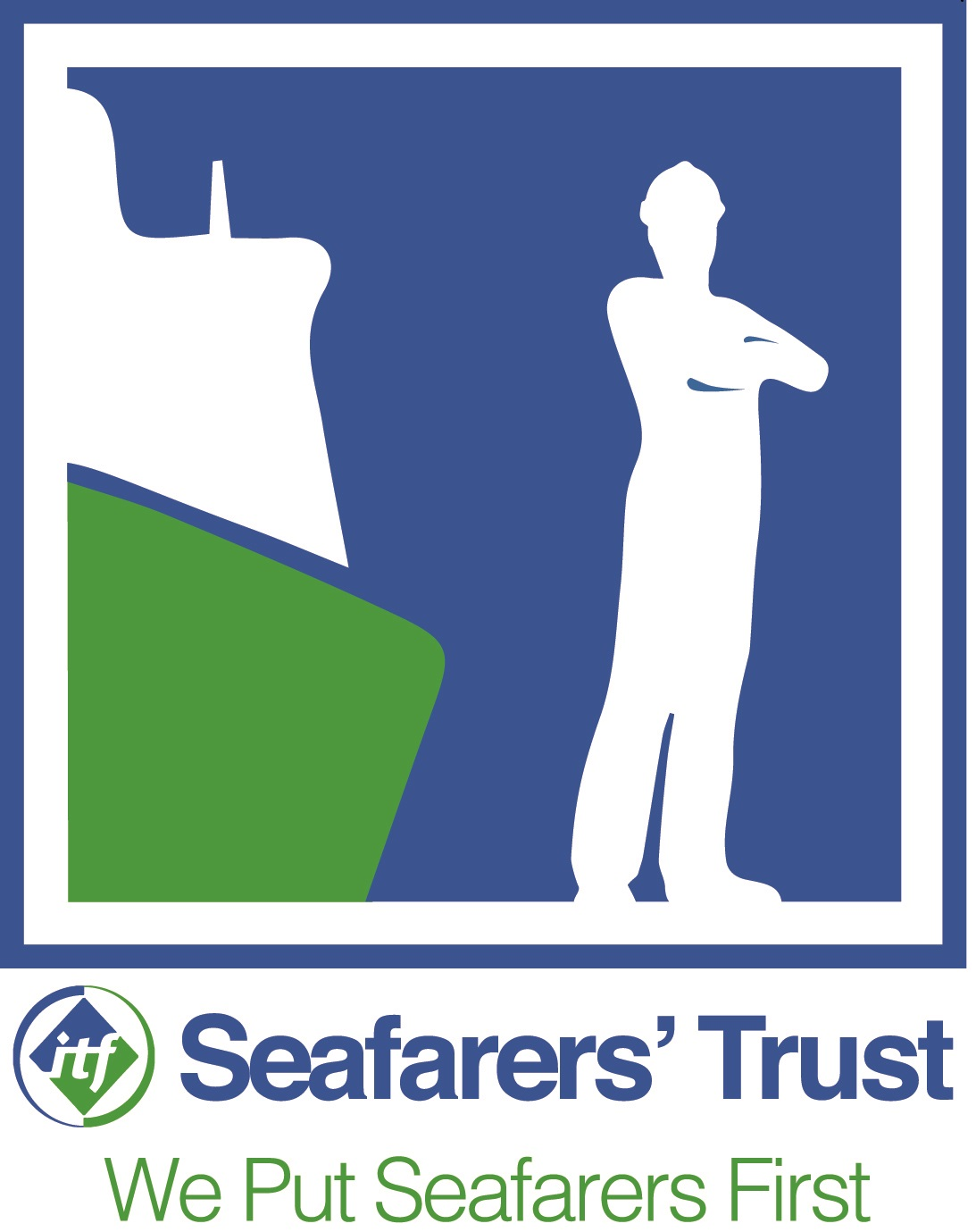
- Founded: 1981
- Type: Charity
- Registration no.: 281936
- Headquarters: ITF House, 49-60 Borough Road, London, SE1 1DR
- Location: London, UK
- Region served: Worldwide
- Key people: Dave Heindel, SIU, Chair of Trustees; Katie Higginbottom, Head of the ITF Seafarers' Trust
- Staff: 5
- Website: www.seafarerstrust.org

The ITF Seafarers' Trust is a charitable maritime trust located in London, United Kingdom. It was established in 1981 by the executive board of the International Transport Workers' Federation (ITF), a global federation of transport workers' unions with over 4.6 million worker members. The stated mission of the Trust is to assist with "the moral, spiritual and physical welfare of seafarers regardless of nationality, race or creed."

The Trust receives funds from both the Trust's own capital funds and by the investment income of the ITF Seafarers' International Assistance, Welfare and Protection Fund, more commonly known as the "Welfare Fund". That fund is used to provide a wide range of trade union services to seafarers. The Trust is limited to supporting projects which directly benefit individual seafarers' spiritual, moral or physical welfare.

== History ==
The ITF Seafarers' Trust was established by the ITF Executive Board in 1981 as a body with charitable status under UK law. The Trust financially supports organisations that directly provide welfare services to seafarers, acting as a lobbyist for change in the maritime community, and support long-term programmes that improve maritime workers’ health and welfare. Its funding comes from the investment income of the ITF Seafarers' International Welfare Assistance and Protection Fund and from capital funds held by the Trust itself.

Since its launch in 1981, the Trust has provided some US$200m to support seafarers' welfare around the world.

== Finances ==
One of the Trust's main areas of funding is providing seafarers’ centres/ships visitors with the means of transporting themselves and seafarers to and from ships by granting service providers funds to purchase appropriate vehicles. The Trust has provided over £2.5 million for this purpose over the last 34 years.

Total grants awarded in 2015 totalled £1,988,062.00. The majority of grants were awarded to projects relating to operational support for maritime charities as well as vehicle purchase and replacement programmes.

During 2021, the Trust's income was £1,263,859 (including almost £1m in donations), while their expenditure was £5,629,898, including 1.1% spent on fundraising.

== Governance ==
The Seafarers' Trust is governed by a Board of Trustees, that are responsible for setting the Trust's strategy, ensuring it fulfils its objectives, and that good governance is carried out. The Head of Trust is responsible for the daily operation of the Trust and is assisted by a full-time secretariat who undertake various administrative, project and programme management activities.

=== Trustees ===
The Trust Deed makes provision for a minimum of five Trustees and a maximum of nine. At present there are six Trustees:

- David Heindel, Chair of the ITF Seafarers’ Trust, Chair of the ITF Seafarers’ Section and Secretary-Treasurer of Seafarers’ International Union (SIU).
- Stephen Cotton, ITF General Secretary.
- Paddy Crumlin, ITF President, Chair of the ITF Dockers’ Section and National Secretary of Maritime Union of Australia (MUA).
- Jacqueline Smith, Maritime Coordinator of the ITF, former President of the Norwegian Seafarers' Union (NSU).
- Brian Orrell, former General Secretary of Nautilus UK and former Chairperson of the ITF Seafarers’ Section and the Trust.
- Maya Schwiegershausen-Guth, Co-Head of Aviation & Maritime Section and Secretary at Vereinte Dienstleistungsgewerkschaft

=== Head of the ITF Seafarers' Trust ===
Katie Higginbottom, serves as the Head of the ITF Seafarers' Trust.

== Activities ==
=== Maritime Piracy Humanitarian Response Programme (MPHRP) ===
MPHRP is a programme to help seafarers and families cope with the trauma caused by torture and abuse during incidents of maritime piracy, funded by the ITF Seafarers' Trust and run by The International Seafarers' Welfare and Assistance Network.

=== Seafarers' Emergency Fund (SEF) ===
The Seafarers Emergency Fund (SEF) has been set up by both The TK Foundation and the ITF Seafarers' Trust, administered by ISWAN. The Fund provides aid to seafarers and families of seafarers, who are directly involved in sudden and unforeseen crises. This Fund is available to seafarer welfare organizations and other welfare organizations to provide the means to purchase goods and/or services for seafarers and/or the spouse or children of seafarers to relieve the need(s) brought on in relation with a sudden and unforeseen crisis.

=== Shore Leave ===
Shore Leave is an offline smartphone app that allows seafarers to contact the nearest seafarers’ centre for assistance or the SeafarerHelp assistance service for more serious issues.

=== Seafarers' Rights International ===
Seafarer's Rights International (SRI) is an independent centre dedicated to advancing the rights of seafarers through research, education and training in issues concerning seafarers and the law. SRI aims to promote, implement, enforce, and advance all seafarers’ and fishers’ rights and remedies, including human rights and the rights of other persons on board vessels. The ITF Seafarers’ Trust are the sole funders of Seafarers’ Rights International (SRI).

=== Fellowships at the World Maritime University ===
The Trust supports up to five students per year to study at the World Maritime University in Sweden, mainly in the areas of Law and the Humanities.

=== Seafarers' Help ===
Hosted by the International Seafarers' Welfare and Assistance Network (ISWAN) and supported by the Seafarers’ Trust, SeafarerHelp is a 24/7, 365 days per year assistance service available to seafarers. SeafarerHelp is a help and advice service for problems relating to life aboard the ship or concerns about health.

=== Other works ===
The Trust partners with ICMA and NAMMA for several programmes around the world, including providing data SIM cards and Christmas care packages during COVID-19 and publishing a book, Out of Sight, Not Out of Mind: 40 Portraits of Seafarers by Seafarers. ICMA and NAMMA are both Christian associations which represent the great majority of seafarers’ centres around the world.
