= International Seafarers' Welfare and Assistance Network =

Non-governmental organisation and UK registered charity

The International Seafarers' Welfare and Assistance Network (ISWAN) is an international NGO and UK registered charity that aims to assist seafarers and their families. ISWAN is the result of a merger between two organisations: the International Committee on Seafarers' Welfare (ICSW) and the International Seafarers' Assistance Network (ISAN). ICSW was formed in 1973 and ISAN was established in the late 1990s. The two welfare bodies merged in April 2013 to form ISWAN. ISWAN's headquarters are in Croydon, Greater London.

ISWAN promotes seafarers' welfare worldwide. It is a membership organisation with the International Chamber of Shipping (ICS), the International Transport Workers' Federation (ITF) and the International Christian Maritime Association (ICMA) as core members. Any maritime organisation that is involved with setting standards for welfare for seafarers is eligible to join.

ISWAN runs a welfare service called SeafarerHelp. ISWAN also runs the Seafarer Emergency Welfare Fund, produces health information for seafarers, and provides information on the location of seafarer centres. ISWAN works with its members for the implementation of the ILO Maritime Labour Convention 2006, which is designed to provide workers' rights and standards in the maritime industry. In August 2015, ISWAN merged with the Maritime Piracy Humanitarian Response Program (MPHRP) and this is now a program under the ISWAN banner. There is an emergency fund for survivors of piracy and their families that is co-ordinated by the MPHRP.

== Funding ==
ISWAN is funded by membership subscriptions, grants from foundations, sponsorship, and earned income.

== Research and projects ==
ISWAN engages in studies, research and projects related to seafarer welfare, including conditions on board ships, health and gender issues. These include:

- Women Seafarers' Health and Welfare survey was conducted with the International Maritime Health Association, the ITF, and the Seafarers Hospital Society in 2015
- HIV/AIDS pilot project
- Port Levies and Sustainable Welfare conducted in 2013
- International Port Welfare Partnership project in conjunction with the International Transport Workers' Federation Seafarers' Trust (ITFST) and managed by the Merchant Navy Welfare Board (MNWB).

== Events and activities ==
ISWAN runs events during Seafarer Awareness Week as part of the International Maritime Organization's (IMO) Day of the Seafarer day which is recognised by the United Nations as an official international day.

The International Seafarers' Welfare Awards are an annual event funded by the ITF Seafarers' Trust. Other supporters involved include the IMO, the International Chamber of Shipping, and the International Labour Organization, amongst other maritime bodies. The awards have four main categories: Seafarer Centre of the Year, Port of the Year, Shipping Company of the Year and the Dierk Lindemann Welfare Personality of the Year. The awards are designed to recognise good practice in seafarer welfare.

The Day of the Seafarer is a 2016 event for Filipino seafarers and families, and was held in Manila. The previous Day of the Seafarer event was called 'Party in the Park', and was held in Manila, Philippines, in 2010.
