= Jacqueline Smith (trade unionist) =

Norwegian labor leader

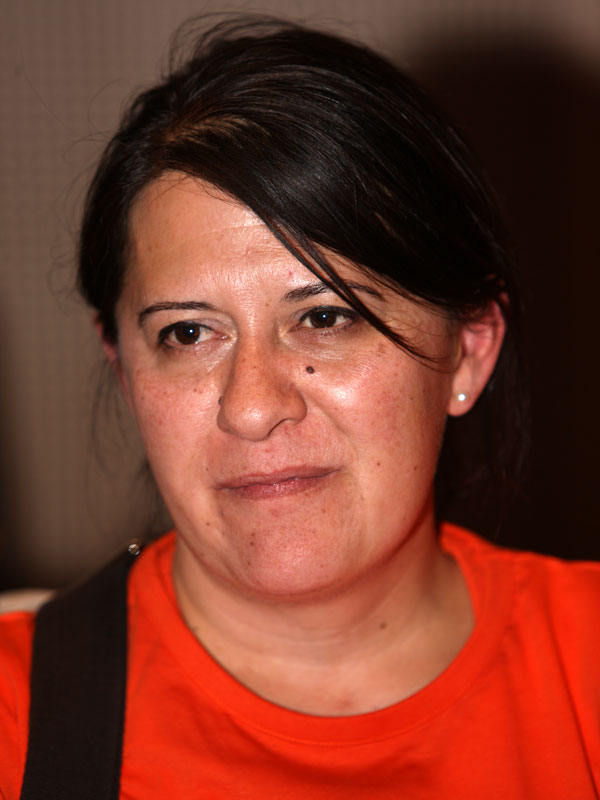
- Born: February 20, 1971 (age 55); Wyoming, United States
- Occupation: Trade unionist

Jacqueline Smith (born 20 February 1971) is a Norwegian trade unionist.

== Biography ==
Jaqueline Smith was born in Wyoming, United States to a Vietnamese American mother and a Norwegian father. The family moved to Norway when she was nine years old. She grew up in Stavanger, where her father worked at Ekofisk oil field, and attended Norwegian-language classes designed for foreign students integrating into the Norwegian education system. The family moved to Asker when Smith was a teenager.

After completing her upper secondary education, Smith enrolled in law school but dropped out a year later because she was “tired of studying.” Instead, she responded to Color Line’s advertisement for a croupier training course. For the next eight years, Smith worked in the gaming department of cruise ships sailing between Oslo and Kiel, and Kristiansand and Hirtshals.

In 1992, Smith, an active member of the Norwegian Seafarers' Union (NSU), secured the organization’s first collective bargaining agreement for concessionaries. Smith was elected as the union’s delegate to congress, and then as the deputy of the NSU national board in 1998. In 1999, she worked in Miami, training Norwegian and international seafarers aboard 53 cruise ships between Miami, Oslo and Setesdal. Speaking to Dagbladet about her experience, Smith explained that, at the time, seafarers were largely unaware about their rights with regards to work and rest hours.

In 2002, Smith returned to Norway and was elected as the union secretary at the NSU national convention. Smith credits her time working as a union secretary for teaching her about how a trade union works. Four years later, in 2006, she became NSU’s first female president and the youngest ever to hold the position. She was re-elected in 2010. During the final year of her second term, the International Transport Workers' Federation (ITF) invited her to take over as a maritime coordinator in London. In October 2014, after Stephen Cotton was elected as the new leader of ITF in Sofia, Smith officially joined the organization and became ITF’s first female maritime coordinator.

At ITF, Smith ensures that seafarers internationally are covered by collective agreements, and the said agreements are upheld and enforced. In 2025, she spoke against the growing instances of seafarer criminalisation, wherein seafarers accused of illegal drug trade, or complicity in maritime accidents are treated as prime suspects even in absence of clear evidence. According to Smith, ITF has recorded 33 cases of unfair treatment and criminalisation of seafarers since 2023 despite the adoption of Guidelines on the Fair Treatment of Seafarers in 2006.

Through ITF, Smith advocates for workers across maritime industries, including dockworkers and deep-sea fishermen. During the Covid-19 pandemic, hundreds of thousands of ship operators were unable or unwilling to allow their crew ashore owing to the lockdown restrictions. Smith called for the shipping companies to use their leverage with the governments to ensure safe and timely repatriation of shipping crews.

In 2021, Smith joined the executive board of World Maritime University.
