= Randall Howard =

South African syndicalist (born 1961)

Randall Howard (born 1961) is a former South African trade unionist.

Born in the Bonteheuwel area of Cape Town, Howard was the second-oldest of fourteen children. After completing school, he worked to support his family. From 1986, he worked at South African Container Depots (SACD), where he clandestinely operated as a shop steward for the Transport and General Workers' Union (TGWU). He soon became the chair of the shop stewards' committee, and organised events such as long union meetings on Friday, intended to disrupt port activities and encourage employers to engage with the union's demands.

Howard's success led him to win election as chair of the TGWU's Western Cape branch. In 1988, he was sacked by SACD, and began working full-time for the union, serving as deputy general secretary, then from 1994 as the union's general secretary. He took it into a merger which formed the South African Transport and Allied Workers' Union, winning election as the new union's general secretary.

In 2006, Howard was elected as the president of the International Transport Workers' Federation. He stood down from his union positions in 2009, when he became an advisor to Richard Baloyi, the Minister of Public Services.

Trade union offices
Preceded by Nkosinathi Nhleko	General Secretary of the Transport and General Workers' Union; 1994–2000	Succeeded by Union merged
Preceded by New position	General Secretary of the South African Transport and Allied Workers' Union; 2000–2009	Succeeded by Zenzo Mahlangu
Preceded by Umraomal Purohit	President of the International Transport Workers' Federation; 2006–2010	Succeeded by Paddy Crumlin
