= Monika Puskeppeleit =

German physician (born 1955)

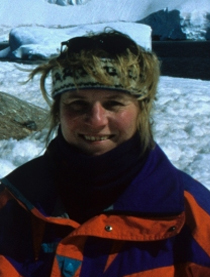
- Monika Puskeppeleit
- Born: April 4, 1955 (age 71)
- Education: Heidelberg University; Goethe University Frankfurt
- Organization: IMHA

Monika Petra Puskeppeleit (born 1955) is a German physician, public health manager and scientific researcher with special interest in medicine of remote areas, especially polar regions. She is the first German medical doctor and station leader of the first all-woman team to overwinter in Antarctica.

== Early life and education ==
Puskeppeleit was born April 4, 1955, her father was a construction engineer, her mother a ballet dancer. Since her early childhood Puskeppeleit was fascinated by the Norwegian polar explorer Fridtjof Nansen. She spent her school days in Frankfurt am Main and Mannheim, where she graduated in 1974 from the humanistically oriented Johann-Sebastian-Bach-Gymnasium, with a focus on natural sciences. In the early eighties Puskeppeleit decided to overwinter as female expedition doctor in the Antarctic and gave first scientific lectures on polar medicine in 1986. She studied medicine at the Johann Wolfgang von Goethe University of Frankfurt, as well as at the Ruprecht-Karls-Universität medical university of Heidelberg, Germany from 1982 to 1984. This was followed by a diploma of tropical medicine from the Berhard Nocht Institute for Tropical Medicine (Hamburg, Germany) in 2003. In 2005, she began a Masters program and obtained a Master of Public Health (MPH) in Public Health Management from the Nordic School of Public Health (Gothenborg, Sweden) in 2008.

The title of her MSc dissertation was ‘Improving telemedicine onboard Norwegian ships and drilling platforms – A study of intersectoral co-operation in Maritime Medicine’. She is also certified in travel and emergency medicine, with OLF certification as seamen's, ship's, and offshore physician. She is fluent in German, her mother tongue, while also being proficient in English, French, Norwegian, Swedish and Basic Italian.

== Career and impact ==
Since 1984 she is a qualified medical doctor with a doctorate in surgery from the Medical School, Heidelberg University (Ph.D.1991). Puskeppeleit is a specialist in general practice and occupational health medicine, certified in emergency medicine, medical quality management, travel and tropical medicine, as well as seamen's, ship's, offshore and expedition physician, with many years of international hands-on medical experience working in both Polar Regions, as well as in Australia, Central Asia, Europe, India and in West - and South Africa. Her research interests focus on maritime and offshore telemedicine, cruise ship medicine, maritime education issues, inter- sectorial healthcare management, lifestyle epidemiology, occupational health, medical quality management, and the education of international ship's doctors. Puskeppeleit's Masters dissertation has contributed to today's understanding and standardization of maritime medicine and has contributed to the Textbook of Maritime Medicine, a comprehensive volume to maritime medicine free of charge from the Norwegian Centre for Maritime Medicine.

Puskeppeleit has volunteered as a coordinator and medical physician at HUMEDICA, an international NGO providing healthcare across the globe, worked as an offshore physician in 2012 at Statoil in Bergen (Norway). Puskeppeleit has contributed towards short-courses on maritime medicine with the goal of addressing the shortage of maritime physicians. The Compact Course Maritime Medicine of the German Schiffarztbörse [Medical Ship Management] and Expeditionsarztbörse provides essential information on maritime medicine within a 40-hour format. She has lectured and published on polar and maritime medicine since 1986, also contributing to a number of books and textbooks. Puskeppeleit is a current member of the German Society of Polar Research (DGP), German Institute for Aero and Space Medicine (DLR), International Maritime Health Association (IMHA), German Society for Tropical Medicine and International Health DTG .

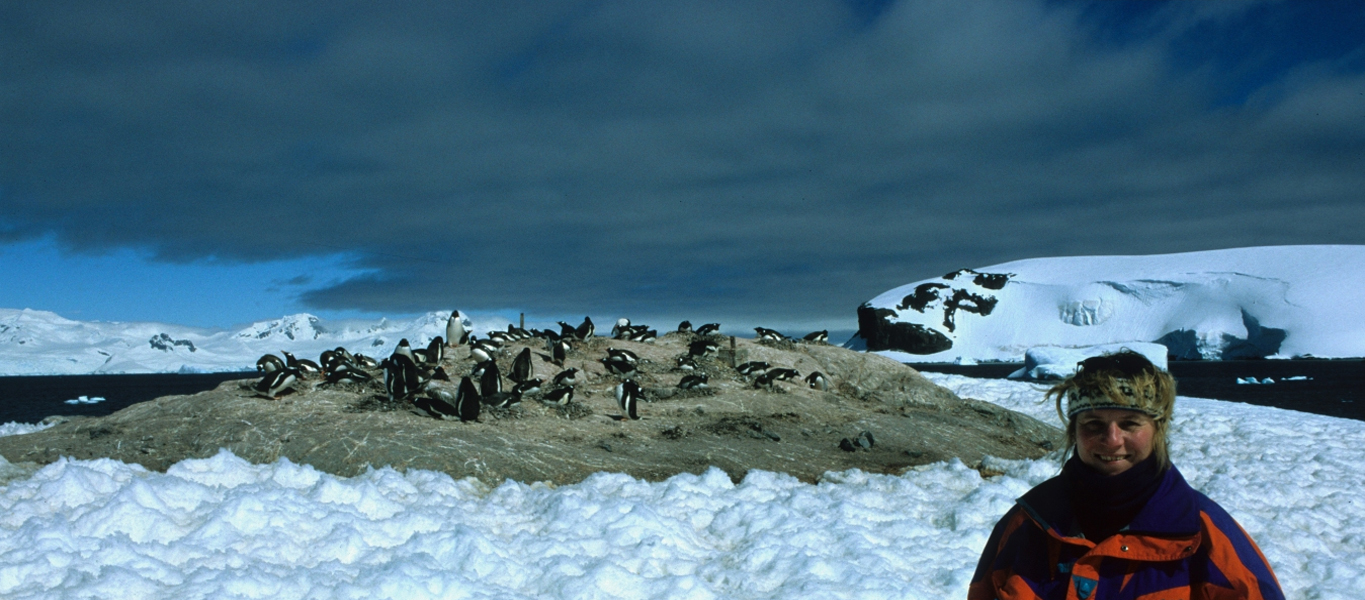
Puskeppeleit at Mikkelsen Bay

Puskeppeleit approached the Alfred Wegener Institute for Polar and Marine Research (AWI) in 1984, wanting to join a German overwintering team to the Antarctic. This goal was achieved in 1989. Puskeppeleit was the first German female doctor to overwinter at the Georg-von-Neumayer Station at Atka Bay (Ekstrøm Shelfeis), Antarctica, during 1989–1991. During this time she was also a member and team leader of the world first female-only team to overwinter in Antarctica. As the first German female station leader, overwintering physician and ship's doctor onboard SA Agulhas S. A. Agulhas Puskeppeleit substantially contributed to changing the perception of women during the time when Antarctica was a male dominated research area. In 2017 she founded the DocShip International e.V. which should act as an interactive international platform for ship's doctor. During her overwintering, Puskeppeleit initiated the first polar- and biomedical research at the German Antarctic overwinter station. She started the “UV–B radiation related biological climate change research project” in cooperation with the German Institute for Aero and Space Medicine (DLR). Other pilot-projects like “testing of wind energy plants as an alternative energy source in the Antarctic” or the “Establishment of an alternative waste disposal system at the German Antarctic station” had been also carried out successfully by the female overwintering team. In 1990 as a contemporary witness, Puskeppeleit made in her function as station leader together with the all-female team a unique sociopolitical contribution to the East-West German reunification on the ice. Through regular contact by radio to the former DDR station Georg Forster (70° 46′ S, 11 50 E) for the first time it was possible to information exchange concerning polar research issues. But also in social interaction the all - female team was able to support their East - German overwintering colleagues by German “bridge building” on the ice.

In addition to Puskeppeleit's south polar challenges, she gained experiences as expedition doctor and researcher also in the Arctic. In 1992, she led a medical aid for Igarka in Siberia in cooperation with the German polar explorer Arved Fuchs and HELP e.V. Later on, she went to other Arctic regions like Kotzebue, Alaska (1994), to Spitsbergen (1996, 2017 and 2022) in collaboration with SINTEF, and Qaanaaq, Greenland (2000) where she travelled together with the last polar Inuit in North West Greenland. In 1997 Puskeppeleit organized the polar medicine part of the "Arktis - Antarktis Exhibition" of the German Art and Exhibition Hall, Bonn, Germany. In addition she gave medical and management advice to various Antarctic expeditions (e. g. the Norwegian expeditions "NAE 2000/2001" with Rolf Bae and Erik Soenneland, Troll Base and "The longest March - 2005/06" Rune Gjeldnes. In 2005 she was the responsible expedition physician for the German ZDF / TV Expedition " Die Karawane" in Mongolia. In 2003 / 2004, Puskeppeleit returned to the Antarctic and worked as scientific lecturer on board a passenger vessel. In the Antarctic season 2019 /2020 she went back to Antarctica on board the Norwegian MS ROALD AMUNDSEN (https://de.wikipedia.org/wiki/Hurtigruten) and joined the journey as expedition team member and scientific lecturer.

== Filmography & TV performance (selection) ==
Eiskalt vereint- die letzte Antarktis Expedition der DDR. (Servus TV, NTV 2011); Transantarctic Expedition- Sir Vivian Ernest Fuchs & 40 Jahre British Commonwealth, together with Reinhold Messner, (German TV -3SAT, 1997); Rund um den Michel- TV Portrait Monika Puskeppeleit- polar expeditions. (German TV /NDR 1994); Medical Aid for Igarka, Siberia, together with Arved Fuchs, (German TV / RTL, 1993); Gender on Ice - Women in a Man's World, (Australian TV, Interview, 1993) and various other national and international TV work and radio interviews.

== Publications & lectures (selection) ==
- Puskeppeleit has published several papers, book chapters, proceedings and lectures concerning the female overwintering in Antarctica and maritime medicine and medicine in remote areas.
- Puskeppeleit M Is the human immune system changing while staying at a polar region? –Antarctica as an example. German Society of Polar Research, Congress proceedings, 14 th International Polar Meeting, Bremerhaven, Germany (1986)
- Puskeppeleit M. Experiences during 14 months overwintering with respect to potential habitation on other planets. A 92–55688, IAF Paper 92–0249, 7p, International Astronautical Congress, 43 rd., Washington, (1992)
- Puskeppeleit M, Quintern L.E., El Naggar S., Schott J.-U-, Eschweiler U., Horneck G Bücker H. Long –term dosimetry of solar UV - radiation in Antarctica with spores of Bacillus subtilis. Appl. Environ.Microbiol. 58: 2355-2359 (1992)
- Puskeppeleit, M. The all-female expedition: Personal perspective. International Conference on Women in Antarctica, Australian Antarctic Foundation, in Edwards K., Graham, R., (eds.) Gender on Ice, Proceedings of a Conference on Women in Antarctica; p 75 - 81, ISBN 0 - 644-35009-1, Hobart Tasmania (1993)
- Puskeppeleit, M. The untold story: The German all-female overwintering. International Conference on Women in Antarctica, Australian Antarctic Foundation, in Edwards K., Graham, R., (eds.) Gender on Ice, Proceedings of a Conference on Women in Antarctica; p 49 - 52, ISBN 0 - 644-35009-1, Hobart Tasmania (1993)
- Puskeppeleit M Medical results during a 14 months all- female overwintering in Antarctica. Arctic History Symposium.IX International Cobgress on Circumpolar Health. Proceedings –Poster . Reykjavik, Iceland (1993)
- Quintern L.E., Puskeppeleit M., Rainer P., El Naggar S., Eschweiler U., Horneck G., Continuous dosimetry of the biologically harmful UV-radiation in Antarctica with the biofilm- technique. J. Photochem Photobiol B: Biol 22: 59-6 (1994)
- Puskeppeleit, M. Die wahren Abenteuer sind im Kopf. In Sobiesiak, M. Korhammer, S. (eds.) Neun Forscherinnen im ewigen Eis. p 125 -146; Birkhäuser Basel, Schweiz ISBN 3- 7643-2991-2 (1994)
- Puskeppeleit, M. The international polar medical research – Organisation and main areas of research. Journal for Flight and Travel Medicine, No. 1, p 43 - 45 (1998)
- Puskeppeleit, M. Ultraviolet International Research Centre - Challenge for Interdisciplinary Human Health Research in the Arctic. Final Workshop of the IASC Project Group on Effects of Increased Ultraviolet Radiation in the Arctic. SCOPE, Paris, France, 1996
- Puskeppeleit, M. Grenzzone Eis-Polarmedizin in Arktis und Antarktis. In Ausstellungskatalog Arktis . Antarktis, 123 Medizin, Kunst und Ausstellungshalle Bonn (1998)
- Puskeppeleit M. Borderline Ice. Polarmedicine in the Arctic and Antarctic. Journal for Flight and Travel Medicine No.2 - 4 (2006)
- Puskeppeleit M. Der lokale Kälteschaden. In Ottomann C & Seidenstücker K, Maritime Medizin, Springer, Heidelberg 43, p 409-416 (2015)
- Puskeppeleit M. Medizin im Offshorebereich. In Ottomann C & Seidenstücker K, Maritime Medizin, Springer, Heidelberg,4, p 35- 46 (2015)
- Puskeppeleit M. TMAS- Telemedical Maritime Assistance Service. In Ottomann C & Seidenstücker K, Maritime Medizin, Springer, Heidelberg,20, p 159- 169 (2015)

== Awards and honors ==
General recognition as the first German medical doctor and station leader of the first all-female team to overwinter in the Antarctic.
