= Swedish Transport Workers' Union =

Trade union in Sweden

Transport
- Swedish Transport Worker's Union
- Svenska Transportarbetareförbundet
- Founded: April 1897; 129 years ago
- Headquarters: Stockholm, Sweden
- Location: Sweden
- Members: 57,000
- Key people: Tommy Wreeth
- Affiliations: LO, ITF, UNI
- Website: www.transport.se

The Swedish Transport Workers' Union (Swedish: Svenska Transportarbetareförbundet, Transport) is a trade union representing workers in the transport industry in Sweden.

== History ==
The union was created in April 1897 in Stockholm, as a split from the Swedish Heavy and Factory Workers' Union. It was organised by Charles Lindley. In 1900, it affiliated to the Swedish Trade Union Confederation.

The union's membership reached 12,300 in 1907, then dropped back. The Swedish Firemen's Union and Swedish Seamen's Union both split away in 1914, and its membership then began growing. The Third Machinists' Union joined in 1923, and although the Swedish Automobile Drivers' Union left in 1924, it rejoined in 1927. The Port Workers' Union split away in 1972, and the Swedish Aviation Engineers' Union left in 1974. Despite this, membership reached an all-time high of 68,128 in 2005. It has since declined, and in 2019 stood at 48,694.

The union's motto is: "The collective agreement defends you if you defend the collective agreement!" (Kollektivavtalet försvarar dig om du försvarar kollektivavtalet!).

There are 30 local chapters of the union around Sweden that assist members. The headquarters are located on Olof Palmes street 29, right across from the so-called LO-castle around Norra Bantorget in Stockholm.

== Membership ==
The union has today (as of 2020) 57 000 members who work in many different fields, such as:

- Surveillance and security (Security guards, Airport security personnel, Parking attendants)
- Dockyard workers
- Newspaper delivery
- Advertisement distributors
- Automobile towing
- Tire shops
- Gas stations
- Airport personnel (Loaders, mechanics)
- Road transport

== International cooperation ==
The union also support an active international union cooperation and is a member of several international labor organizations:

- Nordic Transport Workers Federation (NTF)
- European Transport Workers Federation (ETF)
- Union Network International (UNI)
- International Transport Workers' Federation (ITF)

== Presidents ==
1897: Charles Lindley
1937: Ragnar Helgesson
1953: Sigurd Klinga
1961: Helge Pettersson
1968: Hans Ericson
1980: Bertil Gustavsson
1983: Johnny Grönberg
1990s: Hans Wahlström
2002: Per Winberg
2009: Lars Lindgren
2017: Tommy Wreeth
