= Robert Williams (trade union leader) =

British trade union organiser

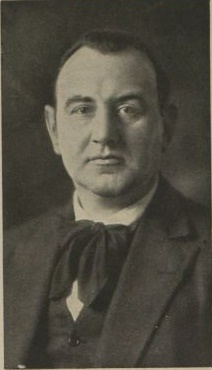
Williams in 1920

Robert Williams (1881 – 1 February 1936) was a British trade union organiser.

He was born in Swansea, Wales, and began his working life as a coal trimmer at the docks. He became active in his union, the National Amalgamated Labourers' Union, at the age of 16 and eventually became its president. He also served as a Labour Party councillor in Swansea from 1910 to 1912.

In 1912, Williams was elected as the first secretary of the National Transport Workers' Federation. In this role, he unsuccessfully campaigned for its affiliates to amalgamate into a single union. He opposed World War I, and was a leading member of the Union of Democratic Control. An active member of the Labour Party, he stood in Aberavon at the 1918 general election, but as a supporter of the October Revolution, he joined the Communist Party of Great Britain in 1920.

In 1920 he was part of a deputation of British trade unionists who travelled to Moscow for talks on the founding of a new trade union international, which was formed the following year as the Red International of Labour Unions. That year, he was elected as President of the International Transport Workers' Federation, and served five years in that position.

Although the Transport Workers were signatories to the Triple Alliance, allying them with the Miners' Federation of Great Britain (MFGB) and the National Union of Railwaymen, on 15 April 1921 Williams decided not to support strike action in support of miners who had seen their wages cut, a decision which became known as "Black Friday". He was expelled from the Communist Party, and renewed his membership of the Labour Party the following year.

Williams stood unsuccessfully for Labour in Coventry at the 1923 and 1924 general elections, but was elected to the National Executive Committee of the party, serving as its chair in 1925. However, after criticising the attitude of the miners during the 1926 general strike, he was de-selected. He also stood down from his National Transport Workers' Federation post, the organisation having become increasingly irrelevant with the establishment of the Transport and General Workers' Union.

Williams also played a prominent role in establishing the Amalgamated Marine Workers' Union in 1922 as an NTWF-sponsored rival to Havelock Wilson's shipowner-friendly National Union of Seamen. From 1922 until 1930, Williams was General Manager of the Daily Herald.

Following his removal from all his labour movement posts, Williams supported Ramsay MacDonald's National Labour Party split. Unable to find regular work, he committed suicide in 1936.

Trade union offices
Preceded by James Anderson	Secretary of the National Transport Workers' Federation; 1912–1925	Succeeded by Frederick James Maynard
Preceded by Hermann Jochade	President of the International Transport Workers' Federation; 1920–1925	Succeeded by Charlie Cramp
Party political offices
Preceded by Charlie Cramp	Chair of the Labour Party; 1925–1926	Succeeded by Frederick Roberts
