= Rob Johnston =

British trade union official

Robert Dan Johnston

Assistant general secretary of the International Transport Workers' Federation
- Incumbent
- Assumed office 2016

Personal details
- Occupation: Union Leader

Rob Johnston is the assistant general secretary of the International Transport Workers’ Federation - a global union federation of trade unions in the seafaring, port, road, rail, tourism and aviation industries.

== Career ==
He was formerly a research and policy officer for Amicus the Union, now Unite, in the UK. At Amicus, Johnston focused on the aerospace sector, helping secure funding for major aerospace projects and acting as an expert on UK Government's Department of Trade & Industry Aerospace Innovation and Growth team.

Between 2004 and 2009, Rob served as director - steel, shipbuilding and occupational health & safety and International Metalworkers Federation, which is now IndustriALL, in Geneva. He then served as an executive director at IndustriALL between 2009 and 2012, before becoming the global union's executive director - industrial and TNC policies, based in Sydney, serving in that role until 2013.

Johnston returned to the UK in 2013 to work as Community's industrial strategy director, which he did until 2016. Johnston joined the ITF in 2016 as the assistant general secretary.

As an international industrial relations expert, he negotiated the ArcelorMittal Global Agreement on Health and Safety on which he also acted as the co-chair. He also served as the TUAC chair on the Steel and Shipbuilding Committee of the Organisation for Economic Co-operation and Development (OECD) 2005–2012.

== Articles ==
- "ITF welcomes new assistant general secretary - International Transport Workers' Federation". itfglobal.org.
- "Parliamentlive.tv - Automated and Electric Vehicles Bill Committee". parliamentlive.tv.
- "*ITFfutureofwork - What is the ITF's position in regards to automation and workers' rights?". YouTube. 31 October 2017.
- "*ITFfutureofwork- What is the Unions' position on automation?". YouTube. 22 August 2017.
- "*ITFfutureofwork - What sort of regulatory bodies should unions be influencing?". YouTube. 14 August 2017.
