= Ingvald Haugen =

Norwegian trade unionist and politician

Ingvald Haugen (16 October 1894 – 20 June 1958) was a Norwegian trade union leader and politician for the Labour Party.

He was born in Hadsel Municipality in Vesterålen, Norway.

President of the Norwegian Seafarers' Union (NSU) 1936 – 1958.

Under his leadership the NSU was the only Norwegian trade union that had escape plans for a situation where Norway could be drawn into World War II. The union leadership managed to escape the German occupation 9 April 1940 and did their part to persuade the majority of the Norwegian merchant fleet to go to Allied war service under the Norwegian government in exile as the world largest shipowning company Nortraship.

In 1945, he attended the World Trade Union Conference in London alongside many renowned trade unionists.

Haugen was elected to the Norwegian Parliament from Oslo in 1945, but did not stand for re-election in 1949.

Haugen started his career barely 14 years old as fisherman (1908 – 1914) and seaman until he was recruited as full-time Union Officer in 1919, first at the NSU Haugesund branch before being transferred to the NSU Cardiff branch office in United Kingdom the year after. He came back to Norway when he was elected Union Vice President in 1926.

Member of the Norwegian Labour Party Executive Board 1936 – 1957.
