= Marine Transport Workers' Trade Union of Ukraine =

Trade Union in Ukraine

- Профессиональный союз работников морского транспорта Украины
- Abbreviation: MTWTU, ПPMTУ
- Predecessor: Black Sea Basin Trade Union Committee
- Established: 1992; 34 years ago
- Type: Trade union
- Location: Ukraine
- Field: Seafarers & port workers
- Members: 78,000 (2022)
- Official language: Ukrainian
- Affiliations: FPU, ITF
- Website: mtwtu.org.ua
- Formerly called: Maritime Trade Union Federation of Ukraine

The Marine Transport Workers' Trade Union of Ukraine, MTWTU (Ukrainian: Профессиональный союз работников морского транспорта Украины, ПPMTУ) is a trade union representing seafarers, port workers and those in related trades in Ukraine.

The union was established in 1992 as the Maritime Trade Union Federation of Ukraine, bringing together the Black Sea Basin Trade Union Committee with workers based around the Sea of Azov and the basin of the River Danube. In 1993, it became the first Ukrainian union to join the International Transport Workers' Federation. By the end of the century, it had about 35,000 members.

In 2002, Michael Kirieiev became the leader of the union. Under his leadership, it grew to about 78,000 members by 2022.
