= Mohammed Saeme =

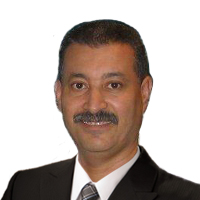

Mohammed Saeme (born 9 December 1956) is founder of the International Maritime Health Association. He has founded various maritime health and wellness companies and is a medical adviser for major cruise lines.

== Early life and career ==
Saeme was born in Fez, Morocco. He studied in Morocco and was licensed as a medical doctor in 1981 and received his doctorate in 1983. He then resided in Oslo, Norway from 1983 to 1999, and became a Norwegian citizen in 1991. Saeme currently resides in Monte Carlo, Monaco, since 1999.

From 1983 to 1999, he practised medicine in Norway, serving as a seaman's doctor. He was also a private general practitioner in Oslo as well as a part-time emergency physician. In 1986, he started his involvement in the maritime industry when he became the ship doctor for the cruise ship Sea Goddess.

== International Maritime Health ==
Saeme has worked around the world, controlling health, hygiene and sanitation on-board commercial and passenger ships and oil platforms. He has also participated in the preparation of new regulations on ship hygiene, sanitation, pharmacy, and minimum standards for cruise ship medical facilities, as well as the updating of the standards for pre-employment medical examinations for seafarers. In 1997, Saeme founded the International Maritime Health Organization, and became its first president from 1997 to 2001. He has also served as consultant and adviser to various cruise lines.

== Businesses ==
In 1996, he established the Maritime Clinic for International Seafarers, Inc. in the Philippines, catering to pre-employment medical exam of seafarers. He also founded Universal Maritime Services, Inc. in 1998 at Nassau, Bahamas as a management company that provides consultation on medical facilities and staffing for cruise lines and shipping companies.
