= Australian Institute of Marine and Power Engineers =

AIMPE
- Australian Institute of Marine and Power Engineers
- Founded: 1881 (as the Australasian Institution of Marine Engineers)
- Headquarters: Sydney, NSW, Australia
- Location: Australia
- Members: ▼1,550 (as at 31 December 2024)
- Key people: Martin Byrne; Ian McAllister
- Affiliations: ACTU, ITF
- Website: www.aimpe.asn.au
- Logo motto reads "Not for one but for all"

The Australian Institute of Marine and Power Engineers (AIMPE) is both an Australian professional association and a trade union. They are registered with the Australian Industrial Relations Commission and are affiliated with the Australian Council of Trade Unions. The AIMPE represents engineers in coastal shipping, the offshore oil and gas industries, towing and dredging.

They cover, in the maritime industry, employed and unemployed marine engineers, engineers or electricians on ships, people in training to be a marine engineer, officers of AIMPE, (when holding appropriate certification) power plant engineers, and (when holding appropriate certification) Charge Engineers and Assistant Charge Engineers employed in New South Wales by Caltex Refining. AIMPE also cover independent contractors who meet the criteria listed. According to the AIMPE's rules, the maritime industry is an operation on any sea going vessel. It excludes shore based operations in the maritime industry outside of shore based training.

Their membership is $1,800 per annum.

The AIMPE is very concerned with the use of flags of convenience by employers as a way of avoiding occupational health and safety conditions and employment conditions.

Even with the demise of the Australian maritime industry, there are now more members registered with the Institute than at any other time. This being due to the offshore industry requiring rigorously trained and certified engineering staff.

Their federal president is Martin Byrne.

== History ==
The AIMPE official website recognises the conflict of interest it has, that marine engineers have, "endeavoured to find a commonality of interest with their employers" in "a world where capitalist efficiency could lead to excesses against which workers felt it necessary to protect themselves by combining for fair wages and conditions." The AIMPE has historically been divided between a professional organisation supporting the bosses (much like APESMA), while also having the anti-boss "Not for one but for all" mentality of a trade union.

The AIMPE began as a craft union, using a monopoly on skill to bargain with employers. The general increase in the level of skill over the 20th century has broken this skill monopoly.

== See also ==
- English, Scottish and Australian Bank, The Rocks
