= James Anderson (trade unionist) =

British trade union leader

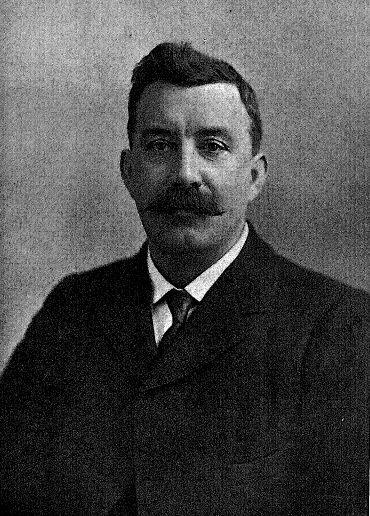
- Anderson in 1909
- Died: 13 May 1917
- Occupation: Trade union leader
- Organization(s): Amalgamated Stevedores' Labour Protection League, National Transport Workers' Federation
- Known for: General secretary of the National Transport Workers' Federation (1910–1912)

James Anderson (died 13 May 1917) was a British trade union leader.

Anderson worked in London as a docker, and he became active in the Amalgamated Stevedores' Labour Protection League. He took part in the London dock strike of 1889, and gained recognition as an able leader. He was soon elected as secretary of the union's Branch 5, one of its largest branches, and also won election to the union's executive council.

In the 1890s, Anderson was elected as general secretary of the union. Under his leadership, the union affiliated to the Labour Party and to the General Federation of Trade Unions, and became increasingly supportive of other port-based unions. He became prominent in local politics, winning election to the Poplar Board of Guardians, also becoming a founding member of the Port of London Authority, and serving on the London Board of Arbitration.

Anderson was involved in the creation of the National Transport Workers' Federation, in 1910, and became its first general secretary. However, its London members rejected a deal it made in 1911, and when in 1912 it attempted to call a national docks strike, it was a failure, and Anderson chose to stand down. He remained in his post with the stevedores until his death in 1917.

Trade union offices
Preceded by ?	General Secretary of the Amalgamated Stevedores' Labour Protection League; 1890s–1917	Succeeded by J. Wood
Preceded by New position	General Secretary of the National Transport Workers' Federation; 1910–1912	Succeeded by Robert Williams
