= Hermann Jochade =

German trade union leader (1876–1939)

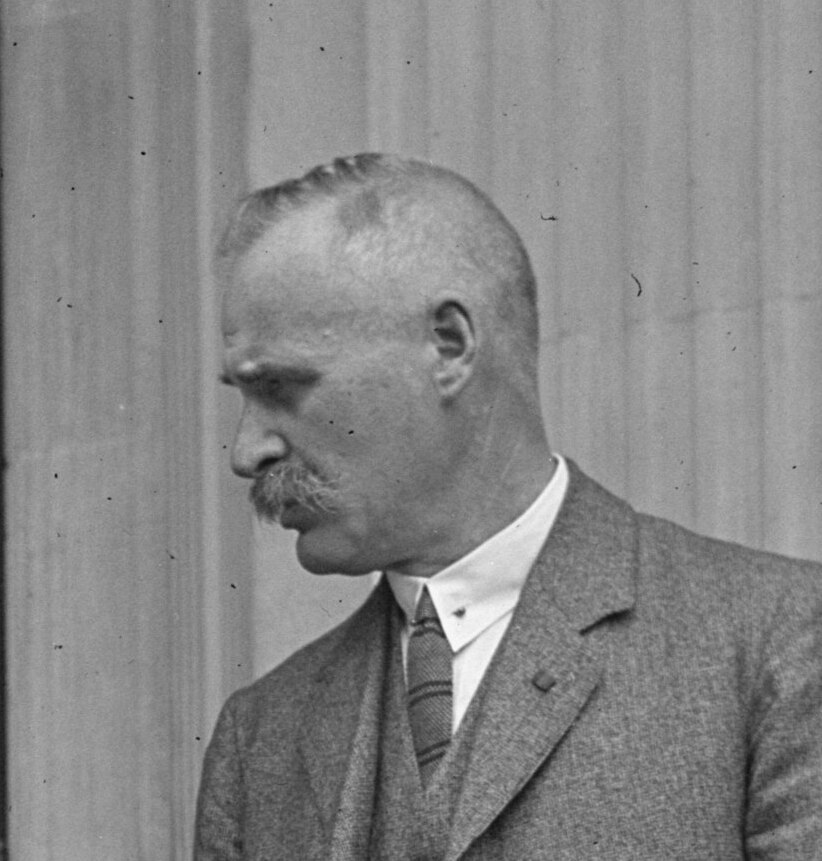
Hermann Jochade, 9-29-25 LCCN2016840839 (cropped).jpg

Hermann Jochade (7 July 1876 – September 1939) was a German trade union leader who was murdered by the Nazis.

Born in Neuhaus im Solling, Jochade was the oldest of twelve siblings, and moved around as his father found work in railway construction. From 1888, the family lived in Lüneburg. Jochade began working for his uncle, building new railway lines, then in 1891 worked in the local iron foundry, and while there joined the Social Democratic Party of Germany.

In 1895, Jochade joined the military, and proved successful despite being denounced for his socialist politics. He left to work in an iron foundry in Kiel, but was fired in 1899 for participating in a strike. He travelled to find work, and for the first time won office in his union. In 1901, it merged to become part of the German Metal Workers' Union, and Jochade lost his position. Instead, he found work editing the journal of the German Railwaymen's Association, regularly facing fines and imprisonment for his writing. The following year, he became the chair of the small union, and led it into the International Transport Workers' Federation (ITF).

The leadership of the ITF was attracting criticism in the early 1900s, in contrast with Jochade's reputation as a well-organised, moderate but fearless leader. In October 1904, he was elected as the part-time general secretary of the federation, immediately drafting a new constitution, launching a journal, and made contact with unions which had left the federation, and by 1913, affiliated membership reached 700,000.

Jochade supported German participation in World War I, and in 1915 was drafted into the army, serving on the Western Front. After the war, he returned to trade unionism, and served on the council of the ITF, though no longer as secretary. He also served on the executive of the German Transport Workers' Federation, and headed its literature department, but resigned in 1933, due to his steadfast opposition to the Nazis.

Jochade was arrested and sent to Sachsenhausen concentration camp, where he was killed in September 1939.

Trade union offices
Preceded by Ben Tillett	General Secretary of the International Transport Workers' Federation; 1904–1916	Succeeded by Edo Fimmen
Preceded by Ben Tillett	President of the International Transport Workers' Federation; 1904–1916	Succeeded by Robert Williams
