= Maritime Union of Australia =

Maritime union organisation in Australia

Maritime Union of Australia (MUA)
- Maritime Union of Australia
- Merged into: CFMMEU
- Founded: 1993
- Headquarters: Sydney, NSW
- Location: Australia
- Members: 16,000 (2017)
- Key people: National Secretary; Paddy Crumlin; 2000–present Warren Smith, Deputy National Secretary; Adrian Evans and Jamie Newlyn Assistant National Secretaries; Mick Doleman Maritime International Federation Executive Officer
- Affiliations: ACTU, ALP, ITF
- Website: www.mua.org.au

The Maritime Union of Australia (MUA) is a division of the Construction, Forestry and Maritime Employees Union (CFMEU) that represents stevedores, seafarers, offshore oil and gas workers, professional divers and shore staff associated with these industries. The MUA was formed in 1993 following the merger of the Seamen's Union of Australia and the Waterside Workers' Federation of Australia.

In 2017, the MUA had approximately 16,000 members. It is affiliated with the Australian Council of Trade Unions, the Australian Labor Party and the International Transport Workers' Federation. From 2000 until its merger in 2018, Paddy Crumlin was National Secretary of the MUA and since 2010 he has been President of the International Transport Workers' Federation (ITF). He also holds the position of chair of the Dockers Section.

In late 2015, the MUA and the Construction, Forestry, Mining and Energy Union (CFMEU) commenced merger talks. On 29 February 2016, at the MUA’s National Conference, delegates voted unanimously in favour of the proposed merger. The Fair Work Commission approved the merger in March 2018. The amalgamated union was named the Construction, Forestry, Maritime, Mining and Energy Union, although the MUA continues to exist as a constituent division and retains the name "Maritime Union of Australia".

== History ==
=== Waterside Workers' Federation ===
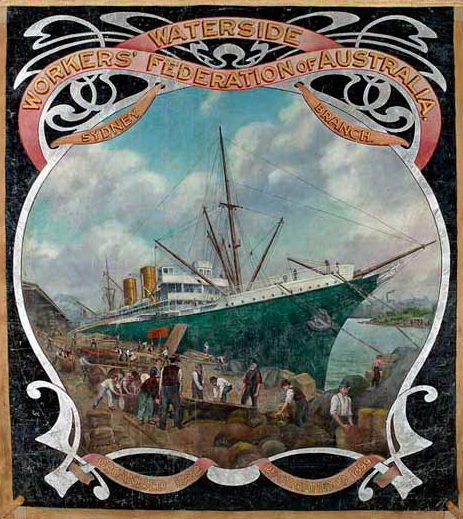
An early banner of the Sydney Branch of the Waterside Workers' Federation.

The Waterside Workers' Federation of Australia traces its roots to the formation on the Australian waterfront in September 1872 of two unions in Sydney, the Labouring Men's Union of Circular Quay and the West Sydney Labouring Men's Association, which merged ten years later to form the Sydney Wharf Labourers' Union. In 1884 the Melbourne Wharf Labourers' Union was formed with the support of Melbourne Trades Hall representatives, after shipowners refused to allow waterfront workers to attend Eight-hour Day celebrations. With Federation in 1901 and the impending introduction of an arbitration system, the national Waterside Workers' Federation of Australia was formed in 1902 under the leadership of Billy Hughes.

The Communist Party of Australia was formed in October 1920, and achieved some influence in the trade union movement, especially in New South Wales. Though its influence had dwindled to an insignificant sect by the mid-1920s, it kept positions in particular trade unions, including the Waterside Workers' Federation. The union was regarded as militant and disruptive to the economy, and has suffered numerous attempts to suppress its activities. In 1928, the Nationalist government of Stanley Bruce enacted the Transport Workers Act 1928 requiring workers to have a licence, known as the "dog collar", to work on the wharves. Employment of non-union labour and members of the Permanent & Casual Wharf Labourers Union almost killed off the Waterside Workers' Federation.

In 1950 the WWF absorbed its industrial opposition the Permanent & Casual Wharf Labourers Union of Australia and in 1991 it amalgamated with the Australian Foremen Stevedore Association but retained the name Waterside Workers' Federation of Australia.

=== Seamen's Union ===
The Federated Seamens Union of Australasia (SUA) was formed in 1876 by the amalgamation of the Sydney Seamen's Union and the Melbourne Seamen's Union, adopting the name Seamen's Union of Australia in 1906.

From December 1935 to February 1936 there was a long strike against an unsatisfactory award and poor working conditions. The strike failed, and the union was left divided and crippled.

== Major modern day disputes ==
=== 1998 waterfront dispute ===
In 1998 the Maritime Union of Australia was involved in a waterfront dispute when Patrick Corporation attempted to sack 1400 waterfront workers across Australia and introduce non-union contract labour.

==== 2015 Hutchison Ports dispute ====
On 6 August 2015, just before midnight, Hutchison Ports, located in Sydney and Brisbane, sacked 97 workers by text message and email – 57 in Sydney and 40 in Brisbane. This led to one of the longest running community assemblies in modern times.

== Politics ==
=== Influence with the Rudd government ===
In 2009 the union ran a campaign entitled Time for a Sea Change in Australian Shipping calling on the government to revitalise Australian shipping by giving tax incentives for the industry to invest in new ships, providing training for new seafarers, and introducing pro-union laws. According to Glenn Milne, a Union Strategy document which was leaked in March 2008 reveals the union also wants a return to pattern bargaining.

At the same time, in April 2008 the union began pushing for access to Howard government strategy documents, which it believes will show ministers conspired with Patrick Corporation to smash the union. The timing of this move was potentially damaging for the union as Julia Gillard was in the process of talking to employers, in an attempt to rewrite the Howard government's workplace relations system. One editorial in the Australian Financial Review said that Paddy Crumlin had done the workplace relations debate a "big favour" by trying to "revive the ghosts of the [1998 waterfront dispute]" because the union's power could show Labor that industries such as cafes, restaurants and accommodation needed flexibility but were being "shut out of consideration because their lobbies are less powerful".

== Merger with CFMEU (2016) ==
In late 2015, the MUA and CFMEU entered into merger talks to create "Australia's most powerful union".

On 29 February 2016, at the MUA national conference, delegates voted unanimously in favour of a merger with the CFMEU.

The Fair Work Commission approved the merger in March 2018.

== Notable officials ==
Notable officials include:

- Billy Hughes – Secretary, Sydney Wharf Labourers Union and Waterside Workers' Federation
- Big Jim Healy – General Secretary, Waterside Workers' Federation 1937–1961
- Eliot V. Elliott – Federal Secretary, Seamens Union of Australia 1941–1978
- John Coombs – National Secretary, Maritime Union of Australia 1993–2000
- Paddy Crumlin – National Secretary, Maritime Union of Australia 2000–present / President, International Transport Workers' Federation – 2010–present

== Blake Prize for Human Justice ==
From 2009 to 2014, the MUA sponsored the Blake Prize for Human Justice.
