= Norwegian Seafarers' Union =

Norwegian trade union

- Norsk Sjømannsforbund
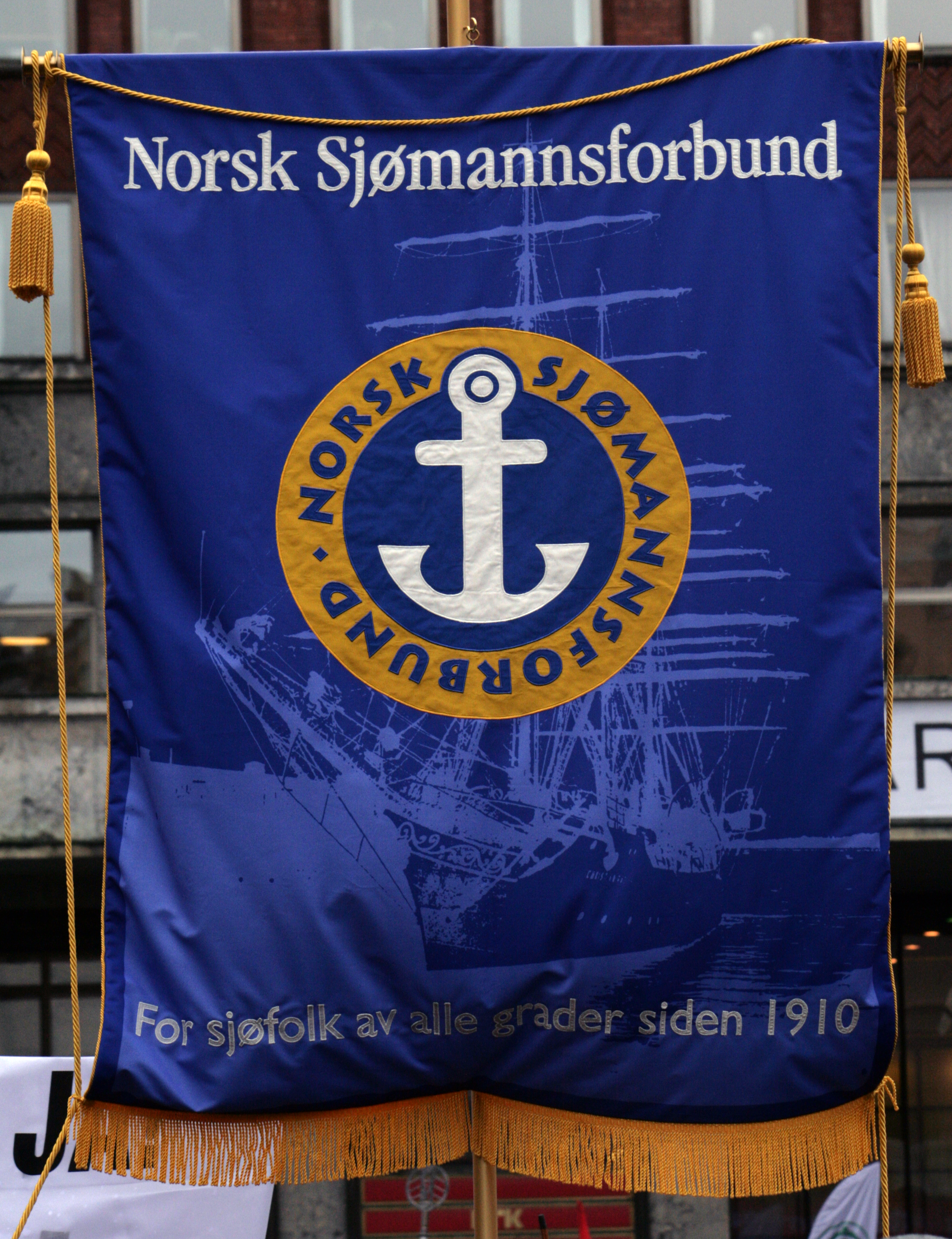
- Abbreviation: NSU; NSF
- Founded: 25 September 1910
- Headquarters: Oslo, Norway
- Location: Norway
- Members: 10,500
- Affiliations: LO, ITF
- Website: http://www.sjomannsforbundet.no (Norwegian language), http://www.nsu.org/ (English language)

The Norwegian Seafarers' Union, NSU, (Norwegian: Norsk Sjømannsforbund, NSF) is a trade union representing sailors in Norway.

The union was established 25 September 1910, as the Norwegian Sailors' and Firemen's Union (Norsk Matros- og Fyrbøter-Union), and immediately affiliated to the Norwegian Confederation of Trade Unions. In 1933, it merged with the Norwegian Stewards' and Cooks' Union, and adopted its current name. The English translation was gradually changed over several years around 2000 from Norwegian Seamen's Union. The change came in order to emphasise NSU's international work for equal opportunities regardless of gender.

The NSU is open for all categories of seafarers from Apprentice Seafarer to Master, but mainly organize all groups of ratings both on deck and in engine, the catering personnel, and some groups of officers like the Steward and the Chief Electrician. The NSU has members sailing both worldwide and domestic, amongst others in cruise, ferries, oil-related offshore/supply, aboard the deep sea fishing fleet and aboard local freighters. The union has 10,500 members, of which 9,000 are working members.

Additional 35,000 non-domicile seafarers are covered by collective bargaining agreements (CBA) negotiated with NSU as either the only employee part or being employee part as one of several cooperating unions. When cooperating internationally with other unions on CBAs the NSU operates through formalized partnerships with other seafarers' unions affiliated with the International Transport Workers' Federation (ITF), usually the national seafarers' union(s) of the concerned seafarers' home country. These international CBAs are usually covering seafarers working on ships under Flag of convenience (FOC) as defined by the ITF, or on ships in the Norwegian International Ship Register (NIS), where Norwegian law allows for non-domicile seafarers employed on local employment conditions (usually with much lower wages) of the seafarers' home country.

Internationally, the NSU is affiliated with the Nordic Transport Workers' Federation, the European Transport Workers' Federation and the ITF. The NSU shares its headquarters with the Norwegian Maritime Officers' Association and the Norwegian Union of Marine Engineers in Oslo. The three unions jointly publish the Maritim Logg magazine, and operate closely together, as the Norwegian Maritime Unions (Sjømannsorganisasjonene i Norge).

== Presidents ==
- 1910–1920 Gerhardt Gulbrandsen
- 1920–1936 Anders Birkeland
- 1936–1958 Ingvald Haugen
- 1958–1966 Gunvald Hauge
- 1966–1972 Olaf Karling
- 1972–1988 Henrik Aasarød
- 1988–1993 Edvin Ramsvik
- 1993–1994 Olav Bjørklund
- 1994–2006 Erik Bratvold
- 2006–2014 Jacqueline Smith
- 2014–2022 Johnny Hansen
- 2022- Kurt Inge Angell
