= Norwegian Maritime Officers' Union =

Norwegian trade union

The Norwegian Maritime Officers' Union (Norwegian: Norsk Sjøoffisersforbund, NSOF) is a trade union representing navigators and those in similar roles in Norway.

The union was founded in 1995, when the Norwegian Naval Officers' Association merged with the Norwegian Shipowners' Union. By 2016, it had more than 8,000 members, and it was focused on improving the pay and welfare of its members, and improving safety at sea.

In 2017, the union affiliated to the Norwegian Confederation of Trade Unions. It shares its headquarters, and publishes a magazine, Maritim Logg, jointly with the Norwegian Seafarers' Union and the Norwegian Union of Marine Engineers.
