= Charles Lindley =

Swedish Social Democrat and trade union activist

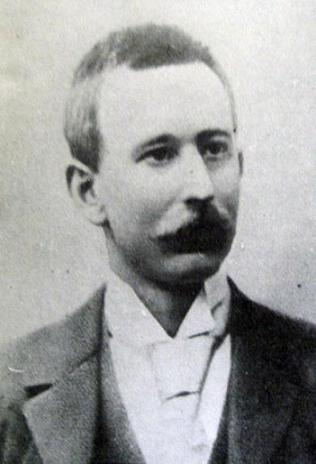
Charles Lindley

Charles Lindley (1865–1957), born Carl Gustaf Lindgren, was a Swedish Social Democrat and trade union activist.

Today, there is a small statue of Charles Lindley in Gothenburg.

== Life ==
Born into a wealthy family, Lindley became a merchant seaman working on English seagoing vessels. He became very active in the British workers' movement, working closely with Havelock Wilson. It was from his British comrades that he received his English-sounding nickname "Charles" (or "Charlie"), which he kept upon his return to Sweden.

Lindley returned to Sweden in 1895, founded the Swedish Transport Workers' Union in 1897 and co-founded the International Transport Workers' Federation. He continued to work closely with Wilson, but unlike his mentor, he increasingly identified as a socialist.

In 1900, Lindley married the Swedish feminist Elin Jonsson, a close friend of the Bolshevik Alexandra Kollontay.

In 1933, Lindley was elected as President of the International Transport Workers' Federation, and served in that position until 1946.

Trade union offices
Preceded by Charlie Cramp	President of the International Transport Workers' Federation; 1933–1946	Succeeded by John Benstead
