= Merchant Navy Welfare Board =

UK charity

The Merchant Navy Welfare Board (MNWB) is a registered charity located in Southampton, England, that acts as the welfare umbrella for the United Kingdom Merchant Navy and fishing fleet charity sector. The organisation describes its mission as "Improving the lives of seafarers and fishers by raising welfare standards in collaboration with our stakeholders".

MNWB's key objectives are to:

- Help improve the effectiveness of all those charities caring for merchant seafarers, fishermen and their dependants and this is done irrespective of nationality, religion or ethnic background.
- Strive to ensure that all welfare needs are met through the most effective deployment of resources.
- Facilitate the work of Constituent organisations through the provision of grants and specialist support services.
- Provide a dedicated welfare support and referral service for UK seafarers and their dependants.
- Manage and support Port Welfare Committees to develop local welfare services.
- Encourage and enable closer collaboration amongst both Constituent organisations and Port Welfare Committees.
- Represent and raise awareness of seafarers' welfare issues at national level.

In May 2021, MNWB was appointed as the UK's National Seafarers' Welfare Board by the UK Government although it has been fulfilling this role since its foundation in 1948. It has signed a Memorandum of Understanding with the Maritime and Coastguard Agency setting out the objectives of this role. The benefits of National Seafarers' Welfare Boards and Port Welfare Committees are enshrined within the International Labour Organization's (ILO) Maritime Labour Convention 2006, Regulation 4.4. The Board is the world's oldest established Seafarers' Welfare Board and the ILO has used it as a template for the appropriate parts of this Convention. Today the Board has over 40 member organisations subscribing to its Constitution, with which it works in close collaboration to provide support services. There are also fifteen Port Welfare Committees (PWCs) within the UK with another in Gibraltar. The PWCs are strategic partnerships dealing with local seafarers' welfare issues, needs, projects and grant funding. Membership is open to all organisations directly concerned with the welfare of seafarers.

== Council ==
The Board's Council (the directors) consists of trustees appointed by the ship owners or ship managers (via the UK Chamber of Shipping), the two UK maritime trade unions (Nautilus International and National Union of Rail, Maritime and Transport Workers), the maritime charity sector and also persons able to make a particular contribution to the work of the charity.

== Finance ==
The Board's primary source of funding is investment income. Whilst it does not proactively fundraise, it accepts donations and legacies, which are used to support its work.

== Principal activities ==
=== Welfare support ===
Welfare support is provided using the Board's knowledge of the UK maritime charity sector, together with a network of industry contacts. It aims to place those from a seafaring background and their families who are seeking practical or financial assistance in touch with maritime charities and other organisations able to help. The Board also operates the Seafarer Support Helpline for the UK maritime charity sector, including the Merchant Navy, Royal Navy, Royal Marines and fishing fleet. This referral service is aimed at directing enquirers to maritime welfare organisations able to provide assistance.

=== Port Welfare Committees ===
The Board manages 16 Port Welfare Committees covering the entire United Kingdom coastline and also Gibraltar. These collaborative committees promote partnerships that co-ordinate and support welfare services for seafarers at a local level.

=== Grants ===
Whilst the Board does not provide grants to individuals, it regularly provides capital and start-up grants to its Constituent Member charities.

=== Training ===
The Board provides a range of training packages for its Constituent Members and Port Welfare Committee members. Its Ship Welfare Visitor Course is used by maritime welfare charities internationally to support welfare provision.

=== Projects ===
The Board undertakes collaborative projects on behalf of its Constituent Members. These include the Mobile Broadband (MiFi) project, Vehicle Replacement Programme, Equality, Diversity & Inclusion project and Port Welfare Accreditation initiative. It also undertakes research, evaluation and feasibility studies, such as the UK Port Welfare Provision study.

=== Publications and information ===
The Board publishes online and in hard copy:

- Port Information Leaflets for the use of all seafarers visiting many UK ports and Gibraltar.
- Work in Fishing Convention (C188) Guide.
- UK Port Welfare Provision study – a report setting out the findings of research conducted by the MNWB into the cost of port welfare provision in UK ports.
- A practical guide for seafarers and their families dealing with loss of a close family member.
- In preparation is a guide covering the responsibilities of the various organisations dealing with vessels that have been detained or arrested. This is aimed at matters that have an effect on crew welfare.

=== Collaboration with international agencies ===
The Board's constitution allows it to support maritime welfare in the UK and Crown Dependencies. It also collaborates, in an advisory capacity, with international agencies involved with seafarers' welfare. The Board has been contracted and funded, by the International Seafarers Welfare and Advice Network (ISWAN), to conduct a pilot project to encourage the establishment of welfare boards, in other parts of the world, in accordance with ILO's Maritime Labour Convention, 2006.

== History ==
The Merchant Navy Welfare Board was established in 1948 following a review initiated, five years earlier, by the Government. As a consequence it took over and enhanced the role of its predecessor, the Seamen's Welfare Board which, in 1938, had taken over the work of the British Council for the Welfare of Mercantile Marine dating back to 1927. The membership of its Council, as now, came from ship owners, seafarers' trade unions and nautical charities, but also Government. Originally, funding was provided by the Government via levies imposed on British ship owners employing the many non-domiciled seamen. These companies were required to contribute the equivalent of the employer's national insurance contribution for each overseas seafarer they employed. Fifty per cent of the income was given to the Board, the remainder to another maritime charity.

At that time (1948) the Board inherited a number of hotels and clubs from the Seamen's Welfare Board, most of which were refurbished, although a few were sold. The Port Welfare Committees were also transferred and most charities caring for merchant seafarers and fishermen became Constituent members. Changes in merchant shipping and the reduction of the UK fleet from the 1970s onwards had a major impact on the need for hotels. Over a comparatively short period, all but one in central London became redundant, whilst the two remaining clubs were transferred to the seafarers' 'missions'. With the demise of the UK fleet Government support and direct involvement was also withdrawn. The sale of the hotels provided working capital that was invested to provide the primary income source for the Board's continuing work. In 2002, the Board took the view that the London hotel was no longer serving its original purpose and this was sold for redevelopment. The capital raised was added to its investment portfolio, increasing the Board's income. This enabled it to provide additional support to its Constituent Members and indirectly, via them, to seafarers and their families. This includes the work outlined above.

The United Kingdom ratified the ILO's Maritime Labour Convention 2006 in August 2013. The Maritime and Coastguard Agency, responsible for implementing this Convention in the UK, publicly recognises the importance of the Board's role within this. In turn the Board's Council sees its role, work and importance in supporting seafarers' welfare increasing in the future.
