= International Transport Workers' Federation =

Global federation of transport workers' trade unions

- Abbreviation: ITF
- Formation: 1896
- Type: Global union federation
- Headquarters: London, England
- Members: 19.7 million in 677 unions
- President: Paddy Crumlin
- General secretary: Stephen Cotton
- Assistant general secretary: Rob Johnston
- Website: itfglobal.org

The International Transport Workers' Federation (ITF) is a democratic global union federation of transport workers' trade unions, founded in 1896. In 2017 the ITF had 677 member organizations in 149 countries, representing a combined membership of 19.7 million transport workers in all industrial transport sectors: civil aviation, dockers, inland navigation, seafarers, road transport, railways, fisheries, urban transport and tourism. The ITF represents the interests of transport workers' unions in bodies that take decisions affecting jobs, employment conditions or safety in the transport industry.

== Organisation ==
The ITF works to improve the lives of transport workers globally, encouraging and organising international solidarity among its network of affiliates.

The ITF is allied with the International Trade Union Confederation (ITUC). Any independent trade union with members in the transport industry is eligible for membership of the organization.

The ITF represents the interests of transport workers' unions in bodies such as the International Labour Organization (ILO), the International Maritime Organization (IMO) and the International Civil Aviation Organization (ICAO). The organization also informs and advises unions about developments in the transport industry in other countries or regions of the world, and organises international solidarity actions when member unions in one country are in conflict with employers or government.

The ITF's headquarters is located in London and it has offices in Abidjan, Amman, Brussels, Singapore, Montreal, Hong Kong, Nairobi, New Delhi, Rio de Janeiro, Sydney and Tokyo.

The International Transport Workers' Federation is governed by its constitution. The Constitution states that ITF is run by an elected executive board meeting twice a year.

The ITF executive is highly concerned about the effects of globalisation, the increased concentration of ownership of international transport companies, global warming, public service improvement, the privatisation of large formerly state-run transport enterprises and automation and the future of work. It notes that the World Trade Organization (WTO) plays a central role in this process and considers it necessary for unions to exert what pressure they can on the WTO to respect social and labour standards in its agreements. It is particularly concerned about the effect that the WTO's General Agreement on Trade in Services (GATS) could have on transport workers by breaking down national transport regulations. It considers it important to oppose the inclusion of transport-related services in the GATS. It considers that the major international finance organisations, including the World Bank and regional development banks, have had a "serious negative impact both on the quality of transport services and on the employment and working conditions of transport workers." It also sees the neoliberal economic policies being promoted by regional blocks including the EU, MERCOSUR, ASEAN, NAFTA, and SADC as being generally injurious to transport workers. It believes it is necessary to create solidarity networks between trade unions, and to improve the coordination between ITF sections, so that effective responses can be made to large multinational business entities which span several regions and many sectors of workers.

== History ==
The 1896 Rotterdam dock strike in May 1896 proved to be the turning point that prompted recognition of what an international union of seafarers and dockers could achieve. The ITF was founded in 1896 at a meeting in London, organised by Havelock Wilson, Ben Tillett, Tom Mann and Charles Lindley. Initially named the International Federation of Ship, Dock and River Workers, in 1898, it absorbed the International Commission for Railwaymen, and so renamed itself as the "International Transport Workers' Federation". In 1904, its headquarters moved to Germany, then in 1919 to Amsterdam, where it grew, under the leadership of Edo Fimmen. By 1939, with World War II imminent, its headquarters moved to Bedford in England, then to London, where they remain.

The federation's first post-war conference was held in 1946 in Zurich, where a new constitution was adopted. In 1949, it established a section for civil aviation workers, and in 1974 one for workers in tourism. It has campaigned heavily against flags of convenience, and in the late 1990s, the ITF operated a floating museum, the MV Global Mariner, which sailed around the world. The vessel was originally built in England in 1979 as the MV Ruddbank, and sank in 2000 off the Venezuelan coast after colliding with a container ship.

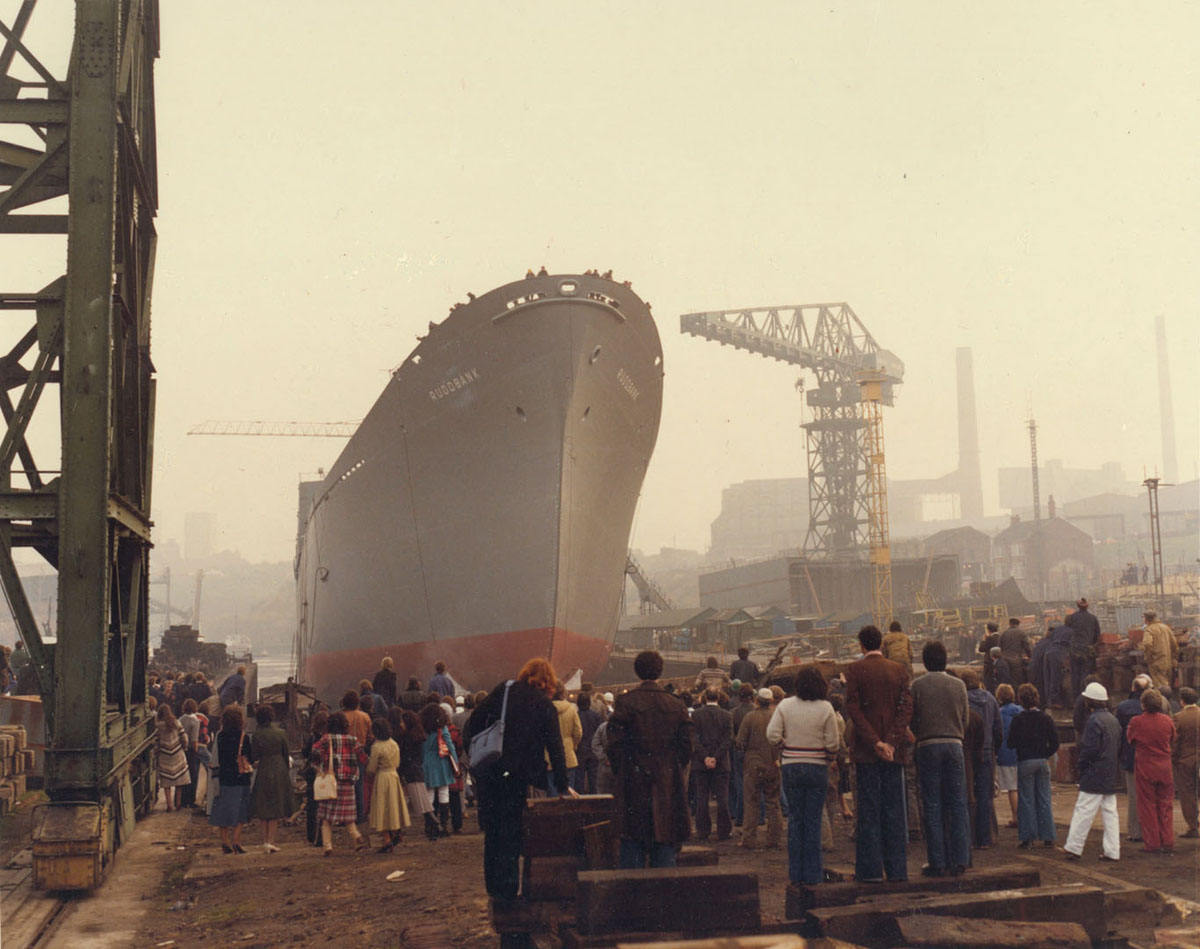
The MV Global Mariner, launched as MV Ruddbank in 1978

The ITF holds a congress every five years in accordance with the ITF Constitution, Rule IV. The congress has supreme authority within the ITF. The 40th Congress was held in Vancouver, Canada, from 14 to 21 August 2002. The 41st Congress was held in Durban, South Africa in August, 2006. The 42nd Congress was held in Mexico City from 5–12 August 2010. The 43d Congress - from 10–16 August 2014 in Sofia, Bulgaria. The 44th Congress was held in Singapore from 14–20 October 2018.

The ITF set up an Arab world and Iran network to deal with, amongst other matters, what it described as the "cancer" of abandonment of ships. Following the 2013 abandonment of MV Rhosus in Beirut, Lebanon, the unloading and storing for years of its explosive cargo, and the ensuing catastrophic explosion on 4 August 2020, the network coordinator said "The flood of calls to ITF in the Arab region has never stopped. Since we created the network and seafarers [became] aware of us, the numbers of calls are going up and up".

In September 2023, Russian authorities designated the Federation as an "undesirable" organisation.

== Misogyny ==
In October 2025, Novara Media reported allegations that Cotton had presided over a longstanding culture of misogyny at the ITF, and had personally engaged in sexually threatening behaviour towards female staff members. Rail union RMT called for his immediate suspension.

== Affiliates ==
In January 2020, the following unions were affiliated to the ITF:

Union	Country
ACOD/CGSP Telecom Vliegwezen/Aviation	Belgium
ACV - Openbare Diensten	Belgium
ACV Puls	Belgium
Air Transport Services Senior Staff Association (ATSSSAN)	Nigeria
Airports of Mauritius Ltd Employees Union (AMLEU)	Mauritius
Airports of Thailand Public Company Limited State Enterprise Worker Union (AOT-SWU)	Thailand
Alianza de Tranviarios de México	Mexico
All India Railwaymen's Federation	India
All Pakistan Civil Transport Workers' Union	Pakistan
All Japan Federation of Transport Workers' Unions (UNYU-ROREN)	Japan
All-Japan Prefectural and Municipal Workers Union (JICHIRO)	Japan
All-Japan Seamen's Union (JSU)	Japan
Amalgamated Transit Union	United States
Amalgamated Transport and General Workers' Union (ATGWU)	Uganda
Amalgamated Union of Seafarers, Hong Kong	Hong Kong
American Maritime Officers (AMO)	United States
Amigos Irmãos dos Homens do Mar	Guinea Bissau
Antigua & Barbuda Workers' Union	Antigua and Barbuda
Asociación Argentina de Aeronavegantes	Argentina
Asociacion Argentina De Capitanes Pilotos y Patrones de Pesca (AACPyPP)	Argentina
Asociación Argentina de Empleados de la Marina Mercante	Argentina
Asociación Civil de Pilotos de Línea Aérea	Uruguay
Asociación Colombiana de Auxiliares de Vuelo y demás Trabajadores de la Industría del Sector Aéreo Colombiano (ACAV)	Colombia
Asociación Colombiana de Aviadores Civiles	Colombia
Asociación Colombiana de Controladores de Tránsito Aéreo	Colombia
Asociacion Colombiana De Mecanicos De Aviaiton (ACMA)	Colombia
Asociacion de Controladores de Transito Aereo del Uruguay (ACTAU)	Uruguay
Asociación de Personal Aeronáutico	Argentina
Asociación de Pilotos de Líneas Aéreas (Air Line Pilots Association)	Argentina
Asociación de Señaleros Ferroviarios Argentinos	Argentina
Asociación Dominicana de Controladores de Tránsito Aéreo (ADCA)	Dominican Republic
Asociación Nacional de Funcionarios de la Dirección General de Aeronáutica Civil	Chile
Asociacion Panamena de Controladores de Transito Aereo (APACTA)	Panama
Asociación Sindical de Oficiales de Máquinas de la Marina Mercante Nacional	Mexico
Asociación Sindical de Pilotos Aviadores	Mexico
Asociación Sindical de Sobrecargos de Aviación de México	Mexico
Asociación Técnicos y Empleados de Protección y Seguridad a la Aeronavegación	Argentina
Associated Labor Unions	Philippines
Associated Marine Officers' and Seamen's Union of the Philippines	Philippines
Association of Employees, Technicians and Managers	Belgium
Associated Philippine Seafarers' Union, APSU (ALU-TUCP)	Philippines
Associated Society of Locomotive Engineers and Firemen	United Kingdom
Association of Flight Attendants – Communications Workers of America (CWA)	United States
Association of Professional Flight Attendants	United States
Australian Institute of Marine and Power Engineers	Australia
Australian Licensed Aircraft Engineers' Association	Australia
Australian Maritime Officers Union	Australia
Australian Services Union	Australia
Australian Rail, Tram and Bus Industry Union	Australia
Australian Workers' Union	Australia
Auto, Taxi & Private Sector Transport Workers HMS Federation	India
Aviation & Airports Services Workers Union (Kenya)	Kenya
Aviation & Marine Engineers Association Incorporated	New Zealand
Aviation Industry Employees' Guild	India
Aviation Radar, Radionavigation and Communication Workers' Union of Russia	Russia
Aviation Workers' Trade Union of Uzbekistan	Uzbekistan
B C Ferry & Marine Workers' Union	Canada
Bambai Mazdoor Union	India
Bangladesh Biman Cabin Crew Union	Bangladesh
Bangladesh Biman Employees' Union	Bangladesh
Bangladesh Biman Officers' Association	Bangladesh
Bangladesh Inland Water Transport Corporation Workers' Union	Bangladesh
Bangladesh Merchant Marine Officers' Association	Bangladesh
Bangladesh Noujan Sramik Federation	Bangladesh
Bangladesh Railway Employees' League (BREL)	Bangladesh
Bangladesh Railway Sramik League	Bangladesh
Bangladesh Road Transport Workers' Federation	Bangladesh
Bangladesh Seamen's Association	Bangladesh
Batumi Seaport's Trade Union	Georgia
Belarusian Independent Trade Union	Belarus
Belarusian Trade Union of Transport and Communications' Workers	Belarus
Belgian Union of Transport Workers	Belgium
Bermuda Industrial Union	Bermuda
Biman Sramik League	Bangladesh
Birlesik Tasimacilik Çalisanlari Sendikasi (BTS) (United Transport Workers' Union)	Turkey
Bond van Personeel in Dienst van Havenbeheer (BPHB)	Suriname
Botswana Transport & General Workers Union	Botswana
British Airline Pilots' Association	United Kingdom
British Airways Hong Kong International Cabin Crew Association	Hong Kong
Bulgarian Seafarers' Trade Union	Bulgaria
Bustamante Industrial Trade Union	Jamaica
Cabin Union Denmark	Denmark
Calcutta Port Shramik Union	India
Cambodian Transportation Workers' Federation (CTWF)	Cambodia
Canadian Merchant Service Guild	Canada
Canadian Union of Postal Workers	Canada
Canadian Union of Public Employees (Syndicat des débardeurs de Montréal)	Canada
Cathay Pacific Airways Flight Attendants' Union	Hong Kong
Centrale des Travailleurs du Transport et Communications - CSC	Democratic Republic of the Congo
Centralorganisationen Søfart	Denmark
Centro de Capitanes de Ultramar y Oficiales de la Marina Mercante	Argentina
Centro de Jefes y Oficiales Maquinistas Navales	Argentina
Centro de Jefes y Oficiales Navales de Radiocomunicaciones	Argentina
Centro de Maquinistas Navales (CMN)	Paraguay
Centro de Patrones y Oficiales Fluviales, de Pesca y Cabotaje Marítimo	Argentina
Chennai Container Terminal Employees Union (CCTEU)	India
Civil Aviation Labor Union	Kuwait
Clerical and Commercial Workers' Union	Guyana
Collectif National des Dockers et Dockers Transit pour la Defense de Leurs Droits (CNDD)	Côte d'Ivoire
Communication & Transport Workers' Union of Tanzania - COTWU (T)	Tanzania
Communication and Transport Workers' Union of Zanzibar (COTWU ZNZ)	Tanzania
Communication Workers' Union of Russia	Russia
Confederacao Nacional dos Trabalhadores em Transportes e Logistica (CNTTL)	Brazil
Confederação Nacional dos Trabalhadores em Transportes Terrestres	Brazil
Confederación Dominicana de Taxistas Turísticos Inc	Dominican Republic
Confederación Sindical de Trabajadores Ferroviarios, LAB, AASANA y Jubilados Ferroviarios de Bolivia	Bolivia
Confédération Camerounaise du Travail (CCT)	Cameroon
Confédération des Syndicats du Secteur Pétrolier Offshore et Onshore (COSYSPOO)	Côte d'Ivoire
CUPE National Airline Division	Canada
Czech Trade Union of Seafarers	Czechia
D.T.C. Employees Congress	India
Danish Aviation and Railway Federation (BLJ)	Denmark
Danish Union of Metalworkers	Denmark
Deniz Çalisanlari Dayanisma Dernegi (DAD-DER) Marine Employees' Solidarity Association (MESA)	Turkey
DHL Employees Union	India
DHL World Wide Express (I) Pvt. Ltd. Employees' Union	India
Dock Workers' Union of Liberia	Liberia
Dock, Maritime, Shipyard and Warehouse Workers' Union of Turkey (LİMAN-İŞ)	Turkey
Dockers' Union of Russia	Russia
Dockworkers' Union Kenya	Kenya
Dominica Public Service Union	Dominica
E tū	New Zealand
Eesti Transpordi- Ja Teetöötajate Ametiühing (Estonian Transport & Road Workers Trade Union)	Estonia
Eisenbahn- und Verkehrsgewerkschaft	Germany
ELA-Zerbitzuak	Spain
Employees and Workers Syndicate of Yemen Airways	Yemen
Estonian Seamen's Independent Union	Estonia
Executive Association - SriLankan Airlines (EASLA)	Sri Lanka
GS	Sweden
Norwegian Union of Municipal and General Employees	Norway
Federacao dos Trabalhadores em Transportes Rodoviarios do Estado do Parana (FETROPAR)	Brazil
Federação Nacional dos Trabalhadores em Aviação Civil	Brazil
Federação Nacional dos Trabalhadores Ferroviários	Brazil
Federación Bolivariana de los Trabajadores y Trabajadoras de Transporte Afines y Conexos (FBTTT)	Venezuela
Federation of Citizens' Services	Spain
Federación de Sindicatos de Trabajadores de los Puertos y Similares	Nicaragua
Federación de Tripulantes de la Marina Mercante de Chile	Chile
Federación Dominicana de Trabajadores de Zonas Francas, Industrias Diversas y de Servicios	Dominican Republic
Federación Dominicana de Trabajadores Portuarios	Dominican Republic
Federación Estatal de Servicios, Movilidad y Consumo de la Unión General de Trabajadores (FeSMC-UGT)	Spain
Federación Nacional de Empresa e Interempresas de Trabajadores del Holding Latin American - Network LAN	Chile
Federación Nacional de Sindicatos de Conductores de Buses, Camiones, Actividades Afines y Conexas de Chile	Chile
Federación Nacional de Trabajadores Camioneros y Obreros del Transporte Automotor de Cargas, Logística y Servicios	Argentina
Federacion Nacional de Transporte Ferroviario de Pasajeros, Carga, Afines y Conexas (FNTF)	Chile
Federación Nacional de Transporte Liviano Mixto y Mediano del Ecuador	Ecuador
Federal Union of Air Traffic Controllers of Russia	Russia
Federasi Buruh Transportasi Dan Pelabuhan Indonesia (FBTPI)	Indonesia
Federasi Pekerja Pelabuhan Indonesia (FPPI)	Indonesia
Federated Airline Staff Association	Fiji
Federatia Nationala a Sindicatelor Portuare (FNSP)	Romania
Federatie Nederlandse Vakbeweging	Netherlands
Fédération Chrétienne du Personnel des Transports	Luxembourg
Fédération des Officiers de la Marine Marchande UGICT CGT	France
Federation des Syndicats des Travailleurs de l'Asecna	Benin
Fédération des Syndicats des Travailleurs et Auxiliaires du Transport du Burkina (FESYTRAT-B)	Burkina Faso
Fédération des Transports de l'UDTS	Senegal
Fédération FO de l'Equipement, de l'Environnement, des Transports et des Services (FEETS-FO)	France
Fédération Général des Chemins de Fer Tunisiens	Tunisia
Federation Generale des Ports et Dockers	Tunisia
Fédération Générale des Transports et de l’Environnement - CFDT	France
Federation National des Chauffeurs Professionnels du Cameroun (FNSCPC)	Cameroon
Fédération National des Cheminots (FNC)	Algeria
Federation National des Taximen et des Travailleurs du Secteur des Transports du Burkina (FNTT/STB)	Burkina Faso
Fédération Nationale des Cheminots, Travailleurs du Transport, Fonctionnaires et Employés, Luxembourg	Luxembourg
Fédération Nationale des Dockers Port	Mauritania
Fédération Nationale des Transports	Tunisia
Fédération Nationale des Transports et de la Logistique Force Ouvrière	France
Fédération Nationale des Transports Postes et Télécommunications (FNTPT)	Niger
Fédération Nationale des Travailleurs des Transports (FNTT)	Mali
Fédération Nationale des Travailleurs des Transports - Union Générale des Travailleurs Algériens	Algeria
Fédération Nationale des Travailleurs des Transports, du Social et de l'Informel (FNTT-SI)	Burundi
Fédération Nationale des Travailleurs du Pétrole et du Gaz, de la Chimie	Algeria
Federation Nationale Travailleurs Ports Algériens -UGTA	Algeria
Federation of All India Aviation	India
Federation of Hong Kong Transport Workers' Organizations	Hong Kong
Federation of Korean Seafarers' Unions (FKSU)	South Korea
Federation of Korean Taxi Transport Workers' Unions	South Korea
Federation of Mongolian Railway Workers Trade Union	Mongolia
Federation of Oil Unions in Iraq	Iraq
Federation of Special Service and Clerical Employees	Finland
Federation of Transport Trade Unions in Bulgaria	Bulgaria
Federation of Transport Workers - PODKREPA	Bulgaria
Federation of Transport, Petroleum and Agricultural Workers	Cyprus
Federation of Transport, Transloc and Public Services - ATU Romania	Romania
Fédération Syndicale des Professionnels de Transport du Congo	Republic of the Congo
Fédération Syndicale des Travailleurs des Transports du Togo (FESYTRAT)	Togo
Fédération Syndicale Libre des Travailleurs du Transport et Entretien Mécanique de Guinée	Guinea
Fédération Syndicale Professionnelle Nationale des Transports et Mécaniques Générales (FSPNTMG-CNTG)	Guinea
Fédération Syndicaliste FO des Cheminots	France
Italian Federation of Transport Workers	Italy
Federazione Italiana Sindacati Terziario (FIST-CISL)	Italy
Italian Transport Federation	Italy
Félag íslenskra atvinnuflugmanna (Icelandic Airline Pilots Association)	Iceland
Félag skipstjórnarmanna	Iceland
Fellesforbundet	Norway
FETROPASSAGEIROS - Federação dos Trabalhadores nas Empresas Transporte Passageiros do Estado do Paraná	Brazil
Fiji Longshoremen & Staff Association	Fiji
Fiji Public Service Association	Fiji
Finnish Aviation Union	Finland
Finnish Seamen's Union	Finland
Finnish Transport Workers' Union	Finland
First Union New Zealand	New Zealand
Flight Attendants Union (Cabin Crew Welfare Society)	Sri Lanka
Flight Attendants' Association of Australia - International Division	Australia
Flight Attendants' Association of Australia - National Division	Australia
Food and Allied Workers Union	South Africa
Foreign Airlines Employees Union	Malaysia
Fórsa	Ireland
Forward Seamen's Union of India	India
Føroya Fiskimannafelag	Faroe Islands
Føroya Skipara- og Navigatørfelag	Faroe Islands
General Confederation of Drivers and Transport Workers in Lebanon (GCDTW)	Lebanon
General Egyptian Flight Attendant Union	Egypt
General Federation of Bahrain Trade Unions	Bahrain
General Federation of Oman Trade Unions (GFOTU)	Oman
General Federation of Private Railway & Bus Workers' Unions (SHITETSU-SOREN)	Japan
General Independent Trade Union of Public Transport Authority and Great Cairo Bus Network	Egypt
General Mazdoor Sabha, Thane (GMS)	India
General Professional Union Of Sudanese Seafarers (GPUSS)	Sudan
General Syndicate of Oil and Gas Workers in Basrah	Iraq
General Trade Union of Air Transport and Tourism	Jordan
General Transport, Petroleum and Chemical Workers' Union	Ghana
General Union For Transport and Transportation Workers	Yemen
General Union for Transport Workers	Palestine
General Union of Air Transport Workers	Libya
General Union Of Iraqi Air Transport (GUIAT)	Iraq
General Union of Petroleum & Chemicals	Jordan
General Union of Port Workers	Jordan
General Union of Public Services (Railway Workers' Section)	Belgium
General Union of Road and Mechanic Workers	Jordan
General Union of Transport & Telecommunication - FWUCI	Iraq
General Union of Transport Workers and Services (GUTWS)	Egypt
General Workers' Union (GWU)	Malta
Georgian Railway Workers New Trade Union	Georgia
Georgian Seafarers' Union	Georgia
Ghana Merchant Navy Officers' Association (GMNOA)	Ghana
GMB	United Kingdom
Government Services Employees Association	Mauritius
Government Transport Corporations Employees Progressive Unions' Federation	India
Guyana Labour Union	Guyana
Handel og Kontor i Norge	Norway
HK Denmark	Denmark
Hong Kong Dragon Airlines Flight Attendants Association	Hong Kong
Hong Kong International Terminal Groups Employees General Union	Hong Kong
Hong Kong Seamen's Union	Hong Kong
Hong Kong Storehouses, Transportation & Logistics Staff Association	Hong Kong
Ikatan Awak Kabin Garuda Indonesia (Garuda Indonesia Flight Attendant Association)	Indonesia
Independent Democracy of Informal Economy Association	Cambodia
Independent Dockers' Union	Lithuania
Independent Federation of Myanmar Seafarers	Myanmar
Independent Pilots' Association	United States
Independent Transport Workers' Association of Nepal	Nepal
Independent Union of Workers in Maritime Shipping Trade and Transport of Montenegro	Montenegro
Indian Federation of App-based Transport Workers	India
Indian National Port & Dock Workers' Federation	India
Indian National Transport Workers' Federation	India
Indonesia Railway Workers Union (Serikat Pekerja Kereta Api)	Indonesia
Industri Energi	Norway
International Association of Machinists and Aerospace Workers	United States
International Brotherhood of Electrical Workers (Local 2228)	Canada
International Brotherhood of Electrical Workers, Local Union 397	Dominican Republic
International Brotherhood of Teamsters	United States
International Longshore and Warehouse Union	United States
International Longshore and Warehouse Union Canada (ILWU Canada)	Canada
International Longshoremen's Association (ILA) AFL-CIO	Norway
International Organisation of Masters, Mates & Pilots	United States
International Union, United Automobile, Aerospace & Agricultural Implement Workers of America (UAW)	United States
Iranian Merchant Mariners Syndicate	Iran
Iraqi Syndicate of Marine (ISM)	Iraq
Israeli Sea Officers' Union	Israel
Japan Confederation of Railway Workers' Unions (JRU)	Japan
Japan Federation of Aviation Industry Unions (Koku-Rengo)	Japan
Japan Federation of Aviation Workers' Unions (KOHKUREN)	Japan
Japan Federation of Service & Tourism Industries Workers' Unions (Service Rengo)	Japan
Japan Federation of Transport Workers' Unions (KOTSU ROREN)	Japan
Japan Railway Trade Unions' Confederation (JR-RENGO)	Japan
Jathika Sevaka Sangamaya	Sri Lanka
Jatio Rickshaw Van Sramik League	Bangladesh
Kapers Cabin Crew Union	Switzerland
Kapisanan ng mga Manggagawa sa GOCCs at GFIs - Transport Group	Philippines
Karachi Dock Labour Board (KDLB)	Pakistan
Karachi International Container Terminal Labour Union (KICTLU)	Pakistan
Karachi Port Trust Democratic Workers Union (KPT DWU)	Pakistan
Kenya Bodaboda, Tuktuk and Taxi Workers Union	Kenya
Kenya Hotels and Allied Workers' Union (KHAWU)	Kenya
Kenya Long Distance Truck Drivers & Allied Workers Union	Kenya
Kenya Shipping, Clearing Freight Logistics and Warehouse Workers Union	Kenya
Kesatuan Pelaut Indonesia (KPI)	Indonesia
Kiribati Islands Overseas Seamen's Union (KIOSU)	Kiribati
Korea Expressway Corp. Labour Union	South Korea
Korean Air Labour Union	South Korea
Korean Automobile & Transport Workers' Federation	South Korea
Korean Construction Industry Workers Union (KCIWU)	South Korea
Korean Federation of Port & Transport Workers' Unions	South Korea
Korean Federation of Tourist & Service Industry Workers' Unions	South Korea
Korean Postal Workers' Union	South Korea
Korean Public Service and Transport Workers' Union	South Korea
Korean Railway Industry Trade Union	South Korea
Kowloon Canton Railway Workers' Union	Hong Kong
Krajowa Sekcja Pracowników Transportu Lotniczego i Obsługi Lotniskowej NSZZ Solidarność - The National Section of Air Transport Workers and Airport Workers NSZZ Solidarność	Poland
Krajowa Sekcja Transportu Drogowego NSZZ "Solidarność" (National Road Transport Section NSZZ "Solidarnosc")	Poland
Kurdistan Transport Unions	Iraq
Kuwait Ports Foundation Workers Union	Kuwait
Labor Committee of Aden Container Terminal	Yemen
Latvian Railway and Transport Industry Trade Union	Latvia
Latvian Seafarers' Union of Merchant Fleet	Latvia
Latvian Trade Union of Public Services and Transport Workers LAKRS	Latvia
Latvijas Udenstransporta darbinieku federativa arodbiedriba – Federative Water transport workers union	Latvia
Lebanese Cabin Crew Association	Lebanon
Lebanese Seaman's Syndicate	Lebanon
LEDARNA	Sweden
Lederne Soefart - Dansk Navigatoerforening - Danish Maritime Officers	Denmark
Libyan General Federation of Trade Unions	Libya
Lithuanian Seafarers' Union	Lithuania
Lithuanian Transport Workers' Federation	Lithuania
Maharashtra S.T. Workers Congress (MHSTWC)	India
Maharashtra State Transport Kamgar Sanghatana	India
Marine Engineers' Beneficial Association	United States
Marine Transport Workers' Trade Union of Ukraine	Ukraine
Maritime and Dockworkers' Union	Ghana
Maritime Union of Australia	Australia
Maritime Union of New Zealand	New Zealand
Maritime Workers' Union of Nigeria	Nigeria
Maskinmeistarafelagid	Norway
Maskinmestrenes Forening	Denmark
Matatu Workers Union	Kenya
Medium and Small Union Group for Transport Workers	Japan
Merchant Navy Officers' Guild - Hong Kong	Hong Kong
Mongolian Transport, Communication & Petroleum Workers' Union	Mongolia
Motor Transport & Road Workers' Union of Russia	Russia
Motor Transport and Road Construction Workers Union of Azerbaijan	Azerbaijan
Mumbai Port Trust, Dock and General Employees' Union	India
Namibia Transport and Allied Workers' Union	Namibia
National Air Traffic Controllers Association	United States
National Airline Employees' Association	Papua New Guinea
National Airways Workers' Unions (NAWU)	Zimbabwe
National Chinese Seamen's Union (NCSU)	Taiwan
National Confederation of Transport Workers' Union (NCTU)	Philippines
National Federation of Automobile Transport Workers (ZENJIKO-ROREN)	Japan
National Federation of Dockworkers' Unions of Japan (ZENKOKU-KOWAN)	Japan
National Federation of Indian Railwaymen	India
National Federation of Maritime Unions	France
National Maritime Section NSZZ 'Solidarnosc'	Poland
National Railway Workers' Union (KOKURO)	Japan
National Section of Port Workers NSZZ "Solidarnosc"	Poland
National Taxi Workers Alliance	United States
National Transport Workers' Union	Singapore
National Union of Air Transport Employees	Nigeria
National Union of Aviation and Allied Workers	Zambia
National Union of Flight Attendants Malaysia	Malaysia
National Union of Hospitality, Catering & Tourism Industries Employees	Fiji
National Union of Public Workers	Barbados
National Union of Rail, Maritime and Transport Workers	United Kingdom
National Union of Railway Workers - PODKREPA	Bulgaria
National Union of Road Transport Workers	Nigeria
National Union of Seafarers of India	India
National Union of Seafarers of Peninsular Malaysia	Malaysia
National Union of Seafarers Sri Lanka	Sri Lanka
National Union of Seamen of India	India
National Union of Teamsters and General Workers (NUTEG)	Ghana
National Union of Transport and Allied Workers (NUTAW)	Zambia
National Union of Transport Workers of Zimbabwe (NUTWZ)	Zimbabwe
National Workers Union	St Lucia
Nautilus International (NL)	Netherlands
Nautilus International (Switzerland)	Switzerland
Nautilus International (UK)	United Kingdom
Nepal Transport Labour Association (Nepal Yatayat Mazdoor Sangh) (NETWON)	Nepal
New Mangalore Port Staff Association	India
New Maritime & General Kamgar Sanghatana	India
Nigeria Merchant Navy Officers' and Water Transport Senior Staff Association	Nigeria
Nigeria Union of Railway Workers	Nigeria
Norwegian Union of Railway Workers	Norway
Norsk Kabinforening (Cabin Crew Union Norway)	Norway
National Union of Norwegian Locomotivemen	Norway
Norwegian Maritime Officers' Union	Norway
Norwegian Seafarers' Union	Norway
Norwegian Union of Marine Engineers (NUME)	Norway
NZ Merchant Service Guild Industrial Union of Workers	New Zealand
Odborové Sdruzeni Zeleznicáru (Czech Railway Workers' Trade Union)	Czechia
Independent Luxembourg Trade Union Confederation	Luxembourg
Orden de Capitanes y Pilotos Navales de la República Mexicana, Similares y Conexos	Mexico
Organisation des Travailleurs Unis du Congo	Democratic Republic of the Congo
Pakistan Airlines Cabin Crew Association	Pakistan
Pakistan International Container Terminal Limited Democratic Employees Union (PICT DEU)	Pakistan
Pakistan Merchant Navy Officers' Association	Pakistan
Pakistan Seamen's Union	Pakistan
Palestine Bus Drivers General Union	Palestine
Pan-Hellenic Seamen's Federation (PNO)	Greece
Panama Area Metal Trades Council (PAMTC)	Panama
Papua New Guinea Maritime and Transport Workers Union	Papua New Guinea
Paradip Port Workers' Union	India
Parat	Norway
Philippine Airline Employees' Association - PALEA - TUCP	Philippines
PISTON Land Transport Coalition	Philippines
Polish Seafarers' Union (Ogólnopolski Związek Zawodowy Oficerów I Marynarzy)	Poland
Port Officers' Union	Singapore
Port Workers' Union of the Philippines (PWUP)	Philippines
Private Motor Transport Workers' Union, U.P	India
Professional Aviation Safety Specialists (PASS)	United States
Professional Syndicate of Seafarers (PSS)	Egypt
Prospect	United Kingdom
Public and Commercial Services Union	United Kingdom
Public and Welfare Services Union	Finland
Public Transport Operators Union	Kenya
Rail & Maritime Transport Union	New Zealand
Railway and Allied Workers' Union (RAWU)	Kenya
Railway Union	Finland
Railway Workers' Trade Union of Croatia	Croatia
Railway Workers' Trade Union of Turkey (DEMİRYOL-İŞ)	Turkey
Railway Workers' Federation	France
Railway Workers' Union (Open Line)	Pakistan
Railways Workers Union of Malawi (RWUM)	Malawi
Rashtriya Mazdoor Sangh	India
Republican Committee of Maritime Transport Workers' Trade Union of Azerbaijan	Azerbaijan
Repulogep Muszakiak Fuggetlen Szakszervezete - Aircraft Technicians' Independent Trade Union	Hungary
Romanian Seafarers' Free Union	Romania
Samoa First Union (SFU)	Samoa
Swiss Union of Public Service Personnel	Switzerland
Seafarers & Maritime Workers' Union of Western Russia	Russia
Seafarers Union of Kenya	Kenya
Seafarers Union of Russia	Russia
Seafarers' International Union	United States
Seafarers' International Union of Canada	Canada
Seamen and Waterfront Workers Trade Union	Trinidad and Tobago
Seamen's & Fishermen's Trade Unions Federation	Poland
Seamen's Syndicate	Bulgaria
Sekar Sejahtera ACS (SS-ACS)	Indonesia
Seko service och kommunikationsfacket	Sweden
Serbian Cabin Crew Union (SCCU)	Serbia
Serikat Karyawan PT Garuda Indonesia Tbk (SEKARGA)	Indonesia
Serikat Pekerja Terminal Petikemas Koja	Indonesia
Service Employees International Union	United States
Services, Industrial, Professional and Technical Union	Ireland
Shipping and Customs Clearing Agents Trade Union (SCCATU)	Malawi
Shivsangram Taxi and Rickshaw Union	India
Sindicato Conductores Navales de la República Argentina	Argentina
Sindicato da Mestrança e Marinhagem da Marinha Mercante, Energia e Fogueiros de Terra (SITEMAQ)	Portugal
Sindicato da Mestrança e Marinhagem de Camaras da Marinha Mercante (SMMCMM)	Portugal
Sindicato de Capitães e Oficiais da Marinha Mercante - Sincomar	Portugal
Sindicato de Guincheros y Maquinistas de Grúas Móviles de la República Argentina	Argentina
Sindicato de los Trabajadores del Transporte Aéreo Colombiano (SINTRATAC)	Colombia
Sindicato de Maniobristas, Carretilleros, Cargadores, Abridores y Conexos de la Zona Marítima y del Comercio de la Ciudad y Puerto de Veracruz	Mexico
Sindicato de Obreros Marítimos Unidos	Argentina
Sindicato de Técnicos en Mantenimiento de Aeronaves de Panamá (SITECMAP)	Panama
Sindicato de Trabajadoras y Trabajadores de la Industria Aeroportuaria de El Salvador y Conexos (SITTEAIES)	El Salvador
Sindicato de Trabajadores de Aerolane	Ecuador
Sindicato de Trabajadores de APM Terminals Quetzal (SINTRAB-APMTQ)	Guatemala
Sindicato de Trabajadores de Empresa Portuaria Quetzal	Guatemala
Sindicato de Trabajadores de JAPDEVA y Afines Portuarios (SINTRAJAP)	Costa Rica
Sindicato de Trabajadores de la Empresa Aviam LTD (SITRAVIAM)	Dominican Republic
Sindicato de Trabajadores de la Empresa CCT (SITRACOLCONT)	Costa Rica
Sindicato de Trabajadores de la Empresa PSA Panama International Terminal, S.A. (SITRAEPSAPIT)	Panama
Sindicato de Trabajadores de la Empresa Transporte Masivo de Panamá (SITMAPA)	Panama
Sindicato de Trabajadores de la Entidad Dirección General de Transportes del Ministerio de Comunicaciones Infraestructura y Vivienda	Guatemala
Sindicato de Trabajadores de la Industria Portuaria de El Salvador (STIPES)	El Salvador
Sindicato de Trabajadores de la Industría Portuaria, Marítima y Similares	Honduras
Sindicato de Trabajadores de la Industria y Productos del Mar (SITIPMAR)	Panama
Sindicato de Trabajadores de Petrolera Transoceánica S.A. (SITPETRANSO)	Peru
Sindicato de Trabajadores de Servicios Marítimos, Remolcadores, Barcazas y Afines de Panamá	Panama
Sindicato de Trabajadores del Metro de Panama, S.A. (SITRAMEP)	Panama
Sindicato de Trabajadores Interempresas de Compañias Navieras	Chile
Sindicato De Trabajadores Oficiales De La Empresa De Transporte Del Tercer Milenio Transmilenio S.A (SINTRATRANSMILENIO)	Colombia
Sindicato de Trabajadores Unidos de Empornac	Guatemala
Sindicato de Transportes, Telecomunicações, Hotelaria e Tourismo	Cabo Verde
Sindicato de Tripulantes de Cabina de Lan Express	Chile
Sindicato de Tripulantes de Cabina de Lan Perú S.A	Peru
Sindicato de Tripulantes de Cabina, Agentes de Servicio al Pasajero e Instructores de Trans American Airlines S.A. (SINTAITRA)	Peru
Sindicato de Tripulantes de Naviera Transoceanica (SINTRI-NAVITRANSO)	Peru
Sindicato de Tripulantes de TAM - STT de la Empresa Transportes Aéreos del Mercosur SA (TAM) Paraguay	Paraguay
Sindicato del Personal de Dragado y Balizamiento (SIPEDYB)	Argentina
Sindicato dos Conferentes de Carga e Descarga nos Portos do Estado do Rio de Janeiro	Brazil
Sindicato dos Engenheiros da Marinha Mercante (SEMM)	Portugal
Sindicato dos Motoristas, Condutores de Veiculos Rodoviarios Urbanos e em Geral, Trabalhadores em Transportes Rodoviarios de Pato Branco (SINTROPAB)	Puerto Rico
Sindicato dos Trabalhadores em Transportes Rodoviarios de Santos e Regiao (Sindrod-Santos)	Brazil
Sindicato dos Trabalhadores nas Empresas de Transporte Aéreo do Município do Rio de Janeiro (SIMARJ)	Brazil
Sindicato Electricistas Electronicistas Navales	Argentina
Sindicato Encargados Apuntadores Marítimos y Afines de la República Argentina	Argentina
Sindicato Flota Petrolera e Hidrocarburifera (SUPeH FLOTA)	Argentina
Sindicato General de Trabajadores de la Industria del Transporte y Afines de El Salvador (SGTITAS)	El Salvador
Sindicato Independiente de Tripulantes de Cabina de Pasajeros de Líneas Aéreas (SITCPLA)	Spain
Sindicato Interempresa de Oficiales de Marina Mercante	Chile
Sindicato Interempresas de Oficiales Motoristas de la Marina Mercante Nacional (SIOMOT)	Chile
Sindicato Interempresas Profesional de Oficiales de la Marina Mercante (SIPROMAM)	Chile
Sindicato La Fraternidad	Argentina
Sindicato Nacional de Controladores de Tránsito Aéreo (SINACTA)	Mexico
Sindicato Nacional de Pilotos de Puerto (SNPP)	Mexico
Sindicato Nacional de Trabajadores de la Industria de la Aviación, Logística, Similares y Conexos de la República de Panamá (SIELAS)	Panama
Sindicato Nacional de Trabajadores de Rama, Servicios de la Industría del Transporte y Logística de Colombia (SNTT)	Colombia
Sindicato Nacional de Trabajadores de Transporte de Pasajeros, Carga En General Y similares De La Republica De Panama (SINTRAPACASIPA)	Panama
Sindicato Nacional de Trabajadores DHL Chile S.A. (Sindicato N ° 1)	Chile
Sindicato Nacional de Tripulantes de Cabina de la Empresa LATAM Airlines Group (STCLA)	Chile
Sindicato Nacional dos Empregados em Empresas Administradoras de Aeroportos (SINA)	Brazil
Sindicato Nacional dos Motoristas e Ciclomotorista da Administração Publica Privado e Afins (SIMAPPA)	Guinea Bissau
Sindicato Nacional dos Profissionais de Estiva e Oficicios Correlativos (SINPEOC)	Mozambique
Sindicato Nacional dos Trabalhadores da Aviacao Civil Correios e Comunicacao	Mozambique
Sindicato Nacional dos Trabalhadores da Industria Hoteleira, Turismo e Similares (SINTIHOTS)	Mozambique
Sindicato Nacional dos Trabalhadores da Marinha Mercante e Pescas (SINTMAP)	Mozambique
Sindicato Nacional dos Trabalhadores dos Portos e Caminhos de Ferro (SINPOCAF)	Mozambique
Sindicato Nacional dos Trabalhadores dos Transportes Rodoviário e Assistência Técnica (SINTRAT)	Mozambique
Sindicato Nacional Héroes y Mártires del Ministerio de Transporte e Infraestructura	Nicaragua
Sindicato Panameño de Auxiliares de Abordo (SIPANAB)	Panama
Sindicato Único de los Trabajadores de los Peajes y Afines (SUTPA)	Argentina
Sindicato Único de Técnicos Aeronáuticos de Lan Perú (SITALANPE)	Peru
Sindicato Único de Trabajadores Marítimos y Portuarios del Puerto del Callao (SUTRAMPORPC)	Peru
Sindicato Unitario de los Trabajadores de APM Terminals (SUTRAPMT)	Peru
Sindicatul National Tehnic TAROM (TAROM National Technical Trade Union)	Romania
Sindikat Pomoraca Hrvatske (Seafarers' Union of Croatia)	Croatia
Sindikat Pomorščakov Slovenije (Seamen's Union of Slovenia)	Slovenia
Sindikat strojevodij Slovenije (Locomotive Driver's Union of Slovenia)	Slovenia
Sindikat Strojovoda Hrvatske - Railroad Engineer Trade Union of Croatia (RETUC)	Croatia
Sindikat Železnicarjev Slovenije	Slovenia
Sindikatu Maritima, Energia no Transporte Timor-Leste (SMETTL)	Timor Leste
Singapore Maritime Officers' Union (SMOU)	Singapore
Singapore Organisation of Seamen (SOS)	Singapore
Singapore Port Workers' Union	Singapore
Sjöbefälsföreningen (Maritime Officers' Association)	Sweden
Sjómannafélag Island (Iceland Seaman's Union)	Iceland
Society of Aircraft Engineers of Biman (SAEB)	Bangladesh
Solidarité Syndicale des Travailleurs et Cadres du Congo - SOLIDARITE	Democratic Republic of the Congo
South African Transport and Allied Workers' Union	South Africa
South Asia Pakistan Terminal Ltd Democratic Workers Union (SAPTL - DWU)	Pakistan
Sri Lanka Nidahas Sewaka Sangamaya	Sri Lanka
St Lucia Seamen, Waterfront and General Workers' Trade Union	St Lucia
State Enterprise Labour Union of Expressway Authority of Thailand (LU-EXAT)	Thailand
State Enterprise Worker's Union of Thailand Post Co. Ltd (SEWU-THP)	Thailand
State Railway Workers' Union of Thailand (SRUT)	Thailand
Suomen Konepäällystöliitto - Finlands Maskinbefälsförbund - Finnish Engineers Association	Finland
Suomen Laivanpäällystöliitto r.y. (Finlands Skeppsbefälsförbund)	Finland
Swaziland Transport Communication & Allied Workers Union (SWATCAWU)	Eswatini
Swedish Municipal Workers' Union	Sweden
Swedish Transport Workers' Union	Sweden
Syndicat Autonome des Conducteurs Professionnels et Routier (SYACPRO-CI)	Côte d'Ivoire
Syndicat Autonome des Jeunes Transitaires Indépendants du Bénin	Benin
Syndicat Autonome des Ouvriers des Transports et des Activités Connexe du GABON (SAOTCG)	Gabon
Syndicat Démocratique des Techniciens du Sénégal-Secteur d'Activité Professionnelle/Aviation Civile (SDTS/SAP/AC)	Senegal
Syndicat Democratique des Travailleurs du Transport Routier (SDTR/3D)	Senegal
Syndicat des Agents de la Météorologie et de l’Aviation Civile (SAMAC)	Niger
Syndicat des Aiguilleurs du Ciel en Côte d'Ivoire (SYNACCI)	Côte d'Ivoire
Syndicat des Conducteurs de Taxi de Côte d'Ivoire (SCTCI)	Côte d'Ivoire
Syndicat des Dockers du Port de San Pédro (SYDOPSA)	Côte d'Ivoire
Syndicat des Marins Ivoiriens au Commerce (SYMICOM)	Côte d'Ivoire
Syndicat des Marins Pêcheurs de Côte d'Ivoire	Côte d'Ivoire
Syndicat Des Pecheurs Et Mareyeuses du Gabon (SPMG)	Gabon
Syndicat Des Travailleurs De Gabon Port Management (SYNAT-GPM)	Gabon
Syndicat des Travailleurs de l'Aéroport (SYNTAERO)	Mali
Syndicat des Travailleurs de l'Aviation Civile, de la Météorologie et de l'ASECNA et de la SALT-STAMAS	Togo
Syndicat des Travailleurs de la SOTRA (SYNTRAS)	Côte d'Ivoire
Syndicat des Travailleurs de l’Aviation Civile (SYTAC)	Democratic Republic of the Congo
Syndicat des Travailleurs de Transport et Communication (SYTRACOM)	Democratic Republic of the Congo
Syndicat des Travailleurs des Compagnies de Navigation Maritimes, Aériennes et de Transit du Togo (STRANAVITTO)	Togo
Syndicat des Travailleurs du Port Autonome de Lomé (SYNTRAPAL)	Togo
Syndicat des Travailleurs du Rail (SYNTRARAIL)	Côte d'Ivoire
Syndicat des Travailleurs du Rail (SYTRAIL)	Mali
Syndicat des Travailleurs Responsables du Congo	Democratic Republic of the Congo
Syndicat du Personnel de l'Aéroport International FHB d'Abidjan (SYNPAERIA)	Côte d'Ivoire
Syndicat du Personnel de l'ASECNA en Côte d'Ivoire (SYNPACI)	Côte d'Ivoire
Syndicat du Personnel du Port Autonome de San Pedro (SYPPASP)	Côte d'Ivoire
Syndicat Général Maritime de Madagascar	Madagascar
Syndicat Maritime Nord (SMN)	France
Syndicat National des Agents de la SODEXAM (SYNADEXAM)	Côte d'Ivoire
Syndicat Natíonal des Chauffeurs et Conducteurs Routíers (SYNACOR)	Mali
Syndicat National des Conducteurs des Mini-Bus du Niger	Niger
Syndicat National des Dockers du Togo	Togo
Syndicat National des Employes de la Securite de la Navigation Aerienne (SNESAC)	Cameroon
Syndicat National des Inscrits Maritimes et Assimiles du Cameroun (SYNIMAC)	Cameroon
Syndicat National des Marins du Bénin (SYNAMAB)	Benin
Syndicat National des Transitaires Mandataires du Togo (SYNATRAM)	Togo
Syndicat National des Travailleurs de la Marine de Pêche de Commerce et des Branches Annexes du Sénégal (SNTMPCBAS)	Senegal
Syndicat National des Travailleurs de la Marine Marchande (SNTMM)	Senegal
Syndicat National des Travailleurs des Transports Aeriens du Cameroun (STTA)	Cameroon
Syndicat National des Travailleurs du Secteur des Industries Extractives (SYNATIEX)	Gabon
Syndicat National des Travailleurs du Transport Aérien Catering et Activités Connexes du Cameroun (SNTTAAC)	Cameroon
Syndicat National des Travailleurs(euses) Autonomes de l'économie informelle	Niger
Syndicat National Libre Des Dockers Et Activities Connexes Du Cameroun (SYNALIDOAC)	Cameroon
Syndicat Uni des Travailleurs de l'Aviation Civile et de la Météorologie	Benin
Syndicat Unifie Des Chauffeurs Et Conducteurs Du Tchad (SUCCT)	Chad
Syndicat Unique de la Météorologie et de l'Aviation Civile	Niger
Syndicat Unique de la Météorologie, de l'Aviation Civile et Assimilés (SUMAC)	Burkina Faso
Syndicat Unique des Conducteurs de Taxis du Niger (SUCOTAN)	Niger
Syndicat Unique des Travailleurs des Transports Aériens et Activités Annexes du Sénégal (SUTTAAAS)	Senegal
Syndicat Unique des Travailleurs du Port Autonome d'Abidjan	Côte d'Ivoire
Syndicate of Middle East Airlines and Affiliate Companies	Lebanon
Syndicate of Workers of Tehran and Suburbs Bus Company (Sandikaye Kargarane Sherkate Vahed)	Iran
Taipei Travel Labour Union	Taiwan
Taiwan Dock Workers' Federation	Taiwan
Tamil Nadu Road Transport Workers' HMS Federation	India
Tanzania Seafarers' Union	Tanzania
Teamsters Canada	Canada
Thai Airways Employees' Association	Thailand
Thai Airways International Union	Thailand
Thai Seafarer Association	Thailand
The Artisans and General Workers' Union	Mauritius
Barbados Workers' Union	Barbados
The Ceylon Mercantile, Industrial & General Workers' Union (CMU)	Sri Lanka
Civil Air Operations Officers' Association of Australia	Australia
The Cochin Port Staff Association	India
The Ernakulam District Waterways Employees' Association	India
The Madras Port Trust Employees' Union	India
The Maharashtra Rajya Rashtriya Kamgar Sangh (MRRKS)	India
The Marine Officers Union (MOU)	Egypt
The Maritime Union of India	India
The Railwaymen's Union of Malaysia	Malaysia
The State Enterprise Electrified Train Workers' Union (SEETU)	Thailand
The Transport Industry Trade Union of Rail, Road, Air and Inland Navigation Workers of the Kazakhstan Republic	Kazakhstan
The Visakhapatnam Dock Labour Board and Dock Workers' Union	India
The Visakhapatnam Port Employees' Union	India
Trade Union of Georgian Railwaymen	Georgia
Trade Union of Jakarta International Container Terminal	Indonesia
Trade Union of Railway Workers and Transport Constructors of Ukraine	Ukraine
Trade Union of Railwaymen and Transport Construction Workers of Russia	Russia
Trade Union of Railwaymen and Transport Construction Workers Union of Kyrgyz Republic	Kyrgyzstan
Trade Union of Railwaymen of Serbia	Serbia
Trade Union of Revolutionary Land Transportation Workers of Turkey (NAKLİYAT-İŞ)	Turkey
Trade Union of Sihanoukville Port	Cambodia
Trade Union of Transport and Communications	North Macedonia
Trade Union Pro	Finland
Transcom	Belgium
Transport & Communication Workers' Unions Industrial Federation	Ethiopia
Transport & Communications Workers' Federation	Eritrea
Transport & Dock Workers' Union, Chennai	India
Transport & Dockworkers' Union, Kandla	India
Transport & Dockworkers' Union, Mumbai	India
Transport & General Workers' Union	Malawi
Transport and General Workers' Union	Zimbabwe
Transport Company Ltd State Enterprise Employees' Union (TRAN-U)	Thailand
Transport Employees Union Bihar (TEU)	India
Transport Federation	France
Transport Salaried Staffs' Association	United Kingdom
Transport Workers Union Kenya	Kenya
Transport Workers' Division of Histadrut	Israel
Transport Workers' Union (TWU)	Fiji
Transport Workers Union of America	United States
Transport Workers' Union of Australia	Australia
Transportation Communications International Union (TCU)	United States
Tüm Taşıma İşçileri Sendikası (All Transport Workers' Union of Turkey) (TÜMTİS)	Turkey
Turkish Civil Aviation Union (HAVA-Is)	Turkey
Türkiye Denizciler Sendikasi (Seafarers' Union of Turkey) (TÜRK DENİZ-İŞ)	Turkey
Tuticorin Port Mariners' and General Staff Union	India
Tuticorin PSA SICAL Container Terminal Staff Union	India
Tuvalu Overseas Seamen's Union	Tuvalu
Uganda Railway Workers' Union	Uganda
Italian Union of Transport Workers	Italy
Unia	Switzerland
Unifor	Canada
Union Committee of Suez Canal Authority in Port Said (UCSCAPS)	Egypt
Unión de Aviadores de Líneas Aérea (UALA)	Argentina
Unión de Capitanes y Oficiales de Cubierta	Spain
Unión de Capitanes y Oficiales de la Marina Mercante	Uruguay
Unión de Estibadores y Jornaleros del Puerto de Veracruz	Mexico
Unión de Ingenieros Marinos (UIM)	Colombia
Unión de Marinos Mercantes y de Pesca Colombianos	Colombia
Unión de Prácticos del Canal de Panamá (Panama Canal Pilots Union)	Panama
Unión de Trabajadores del Transporte Marítimo, Aéreo, Terrestre y Afines (UTT)	Uruguay
Unión del Personal Superior y Profesional de Empresas Aerocomerciales	Argentina
Union des Chauffeurs routiers du Burkina	Burkina Faso
Union des Routiers du Sénégal (URS)	Senegal
Union des Routiers du Togo	Togo
Union des Syndicats et des Travailleurs du Secteur Multimodal du Gabon (USYTZPOG)	Gabon
Union des Syndicats UMT des Transports	Morocco
Unión Ferroviaria (UF)	Argentina
Union Nationale des Syndicats Autonomes (UNSA Transports)	France
Union of Beirut Port Employees	Lebanon
Union of Employees of Port Ancillary Services Suppliers Port Klang (UNEPASS)	Malaysia
Union of Shop, Distributive and Allied Workers	United Kingdom
Union of Transport Workers	Switzerland
Union of Trekking, Travel, Rafting, Airlines, Archeologies, Culture and Cargo Workers, Nepal (UNITRAV)	Nepal
Unión Panameña de Aviadores Comerciales	Panama
Union pour la Solidarité Agissante (USA)	Democratic Republic of the Congo
Unión Sindical Obrera Sector Transporte Aéreo (USO-STA)	Spain
Unionen	Sweden
UNITE HERE	United States
Unite The Union	United Kingdom
United Federation of Danish Workers	Denmark
United Minibus Union (UMU)	Guyana
United Seamen, Ports and General Workers' Union of Liberia (USPOGUL)	Liberia
United Workers' Union of Liberia	Liberia
Usukana Wa Massiwa (UWM)	Comoros
Vasúti Dolgozók Szabad Szakszervezete Szolidaritás (Free Trade Union of Railway Workers Solidarity)	Hungary
ver.di	Germany
Vida	Austria
Vil'na Profspilka Mashynistiv Ukrainy (VPMU) (Ukrainian Free Trade Union of Locomotive Engineers)	Ukraine
VM - Félag vélstóra og málmtæknimanna (Icelandic Union of Marine Engineers and Metal Technicians)	Iceland
Waterfront and Allied Workers' Union	Dominica
Wingspan Workers' Union	Thailand
Workers Union & Affiliation of Iraqi Ports Company	Iraq
Workers Union in the Ministry of Transportation	Kuwait
Workers Union of Kuwait Airways & Subsidiaries	Kuwait
Workers' Union of Solomon Islands	Solomon Islands
Yemen Pilots & Flight Engineers Union	Yemen
Yemeni Aviation Engineers Syndicate	Yemen
Younion	Austria
Yrkestrafikkforbundet	Norway
Zanzibar Seafarers Union	Tanzania
Zimbabwe Amalgamated Railway Workers' Union	Zimbabwe

== Leadership ==
=== General Secretaries ===
1896: Ben Tillett
1896: Robert Peddie
1896: Tom Chambers
1904: Ben Tillett
1904: Hermann Jochade
1919: Edo Fimmen
1942: Jacobus Oldenbroek
1950: Omer Becu
1960: Pieter de Vries
1965: Hans Imhof
1968: Charles Blyth
1977: Harold Lewis
1993: David Cockcroft
2014: Stephen Cotton

=== Presidents ===
1893: Tom Mann
1901: Tom Chambers
1904: Ben Tillett
1904: Hermann Jochade
1920: Robert Williams
1925: Charlie Cramp
1933: Charles Lindley
1946: John Benstead
1947: Omer Becu
1950: Robert Bratschi
1954: Arthur Deakin
1955: Hans Jahn
1958: Frank Cousins
1960: Roger Dekeyzer
1962: Frank Cousins
1965: Hans Düby
1971: Fritz Prechtl
1986: Jim Hunter
1994: Eike Eulen
1998: Umraomal Purohit
2006: Randall Howard
2010: Paddy Crumlin

== See also ==
- ITF Seafarers' Trust
- Charles Lindley
- Flag of convenience
- M/T Haven
- Universe Tankships Inc of Monrovia v International Transport Workers' Federation [1982] 2 All ER 67
- International Transport Workers Federation v Viking Line ABP [2008] IRLR 143 (C-438/05)
