= International Maritime Health Association =

The International Maritime Health Association focuses on maritime health and safety with the objective to improve the quality of health of seafarers, fishermen, and port workers. The IMHA was founded on June 17, 1997, during the 4th ISMH in Oslo, Norway chaired by Mohammed Saeme, who was also its first president. IMHA develops standards aim to improve the maritime health practices internationally, coordinating with national maritime authorities, the maritime industry, unions, and other international organizations.

== International Symposia on Maritime Health ==
IMHA holds the International Symposium on Maritime Health for members to present their studies on international maritime health biannually. The inaugurate symposium was in Turku Finland, 1991. The 10th ISMH was held in Goa, India. The 11th and 12th ISMH was held at Odessa in 2011 and France in 2013, respectively.

== IMHA-Research 2014-2019 ==
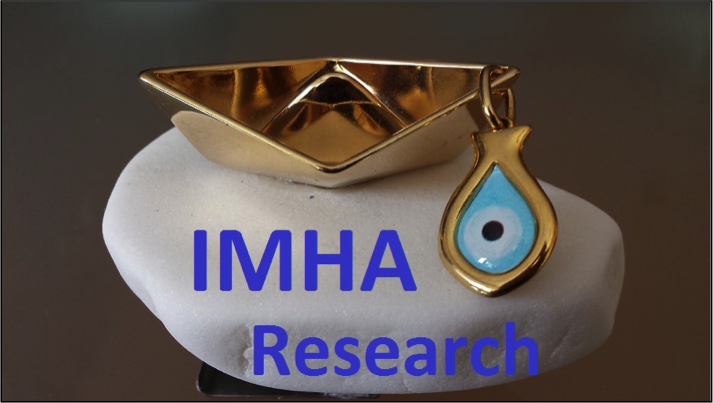
IMHA Research logo created by Luisa Canals, Chair of the IMHA-Research

IMHA Research was founded as a subgroup to IMHA in 2014 after some years of discussions and further developed especially related to the mental health and well-being promotion strategy by the European Commission The objectives were to provide a foundation safe and healthy preventive strategies within the UN Global Sustainable Goals, especially Goal 3: Good health and well-being for all workers and Goal 8: Decent Work and Economic Growth. Further, to encourage health research collaboration within and across disciplinary boundaries to establish evidence that will benefit the health of seafarers and help to improve safety and operational efficiency in the maritime sector. The activities in IMHA-Research declined over the years especially also caused by the Covid-19 Pandemic that hinders international meetings.

== Maritime Health Research and Education-Net MAHRE-Net ==
Based on friendships and discussions over thirty years during the International Maritime Symposia the MAHRE-Net was founded in Zoom meeting 3 Sep 2020 5pm CET by members of IMHA-Research as an independent, non-profit Network. The aim is to improve and further develop the maritime health research and education based on the ideas and the work in IMHA-research, and recognized by the IMHA Board of Directors. The research programs and the methodological education Diplomas are not only for the maritime areas but for all industries. The background for MAHRE-Net origines from some similar research and educative initiatives like the International Maritime Health Surveillance Project 1997–2005.

== The International Diabetes and Hypertension Research Group ==
On the 12 Jan 2022, The International Diabetes and Hypertension Research Group for fishers, seafarers and other transport workers was created in a Zoom conference by specialists in diabetes epidemiology, diabetology, occupational and maritime medicine and public health with participation from Greenland, Russia, Denmark, Spain, France, Panamá and The Filippines. The aim is to provide a foundation for safe and healthy preventive strategies within the UN Global Sustainable Goals, especially Goal 3: Good health and well-being for all, Goal 4: Quality education; Goal 8: Decent Work and Economic Growth and Goal 17: Partnerships to achieve the Goals - with the primary tasks:

1. Revision of the ILO Guidelines for medical examinations (Urine dipstick to be replaced by valid methods)
2. Screening program for T2DM and Hypertension via routine medical fit-for-duty exams (article 2022)
3. T2D and HTN Research and Education plan 2023-2032 presented 2023 Oct
4. Screening program for T2D/HTN in the medical examinations July 2023
5. The multicenter, Maritime T2/HTN intervention study from Oct 2023
6. Revision of the ILO Guidelines for medical examination for seafarers and the WHO International Medical Guide for Ships
7. Revision of the Ships Medical Chest
