= Stephen Cotton =

UK union leader

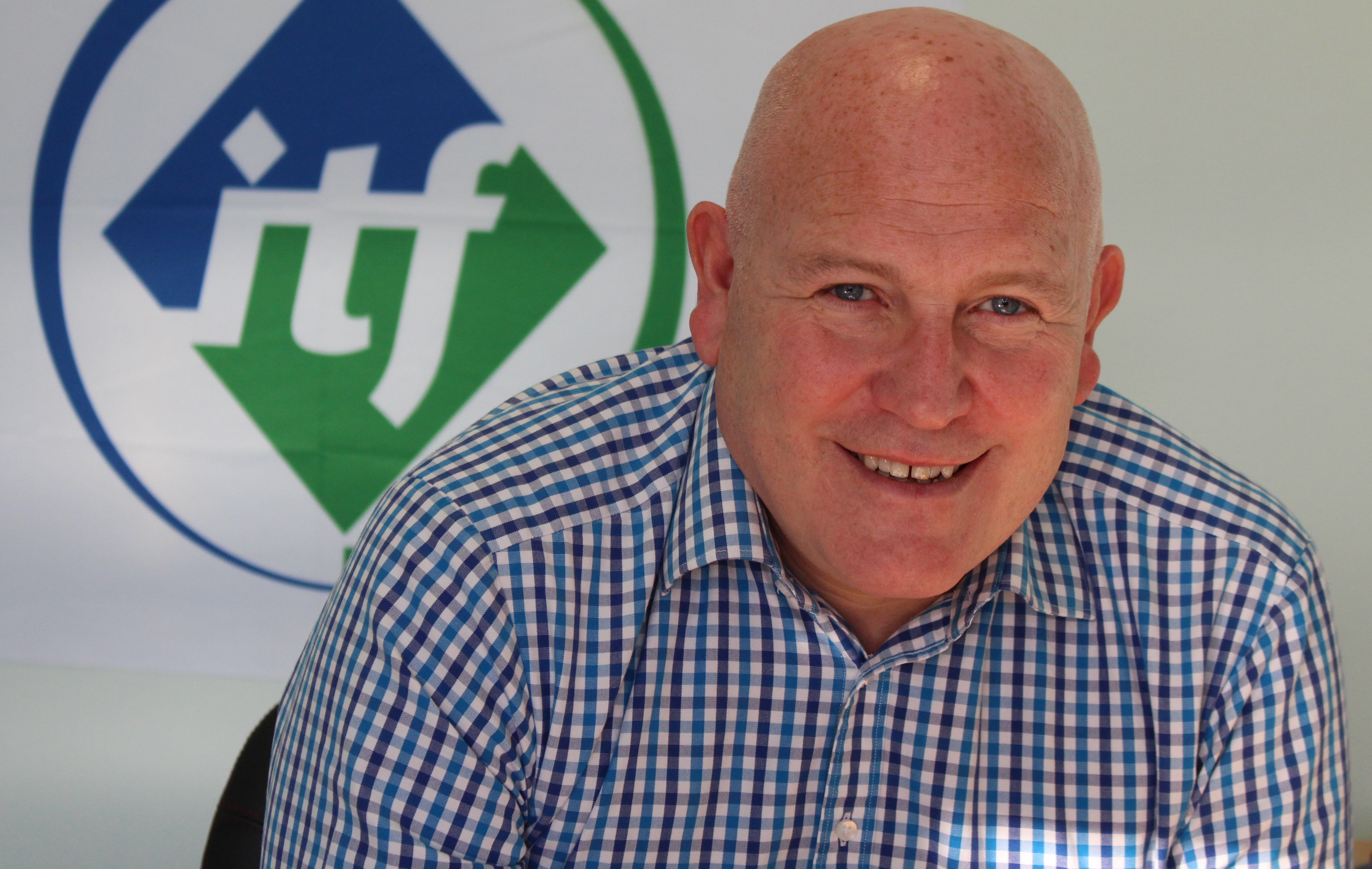
- ITF general secretary Stephen Cotton

General Secretary of the International Transport Workers' Federation
- Incumbent
- Assumed office 2014
- Preceded by: David Cockcroft

Personal details
- Occupation: Union Leader
- Awards: United Seamen's Service (USS) Admiral of the Ocean Sea Award (AOTOS)

Stephen Cotton is the general secretary of the International Transport Workers' Federation (ITF) – a global union federation of 677 trade unions representing 19.7 million workers in 149 countries in the seafaring, port, road, rail, tourism and aviation sectors. He was elected to the position at the 43rd ITF Congress held in Sofia, Bulgaria in 2014 and reelected at the 44th ITF Congress held in Singapore in 2018.

== International Transport Workers' Federation ==
Cotton joined the ITF in 1993 as the head of the agreements unit in the maritime section. He was later promoted to the position of assistant secretary of the special seafarers' department (SSD), secretary of the SSD and maritime coordinator prior to his appointment as acting general secretary in October 2012.

In 2014, Cotton received the United Seamen's Service (USS) Admiral of the Ocean Sea Award (AOTOS), the maritime industry's most prestigious award, in recognition of his work for defending the well-being and fair treatment of seafarers around the world.

Under Cotton's leadership of the ITF's maritime section, the ITF inspectorate expanded from 35 to 147 inspectors and contacts, and ships covered under ITF collective bargaining agreements increased to over 12,000 from less than 2,000. Cotton oversaw major Flags of Convenience (FOC) policy changes and led the introduction of 'Oslo to Delhi' and Mexico City policies, which laid the foundation for the landmark 2006 signing of the International Labour Organization's Maritime Labour Convention (MLC) – establishing a set of international minimum standards enforceable by international law.

Cotton is a trustee of the ITF Seafarers' Trust, the International Maritime Training Trust and serves on the United Seaman's Service governing body.

== Misogyny allegations ==
In October 2025, Novara Media reported allegations that Cotton had presided over a longstanding culture of misogyny at the ITF, and had personally engaged in sexually threatening behaviour towards female staff members.

== Union busting ==
In January 2026, Cotton oversaw the sacking of two union reps from the ITF's London office, following cuts to a third of the staff, and has since refused to comply with the union's own grievance procedures, claiming that arbitration 'has no prospect' of resolving the dispute.
