= Paddy Crumlin =

Australian trade unionist

Padraig 'Paddy' Crumlin
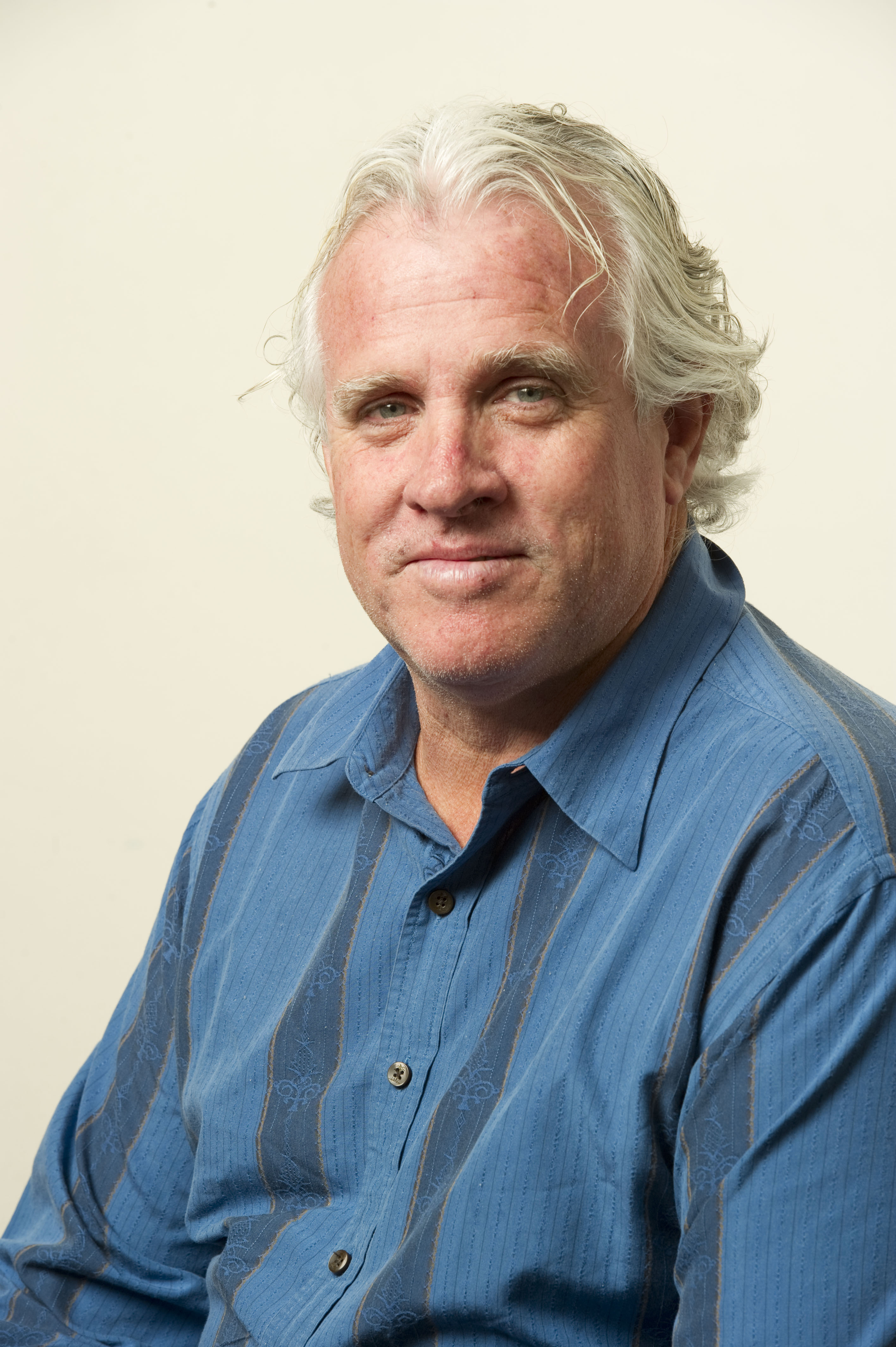
- MUA National Secretary and ITF President Paddy Crumlin

National Secretary of the Maritime Union of Australia
- In office 2000–Present

President of the International Transport Workers' Federation
- Incumbent
- Assumed office August 2010

Personal details
- Born: Riverwood, New South Wales
- Occupation: Seafarer

Padraig "Paddy" Crumlin is an Australian trade unionist. In addition to his leadership of the Maritime Union of Australia since 2000, he has been the President of the International Transport Workers' Federation (ITF) since 2010 and the National President of the Construction, Forestry and Maritime Employees Union since 2021.

Crumlin is a long-term advocate and proponent of Workers Capital; the responsible investment of workers' superannuation and pension funds and has held leadership positions with the Maritime Super fund and is the Co-Chair of the Committee on Workers Capital, a global effort to coordinate investment policies that meet Environmental, Social and Governance targets to ensure workers' retirement funds are invested ethically and responsibly.

Crumlin serves a Director of the ACTU's Centre for Workers' Capital in Australia and chairs a number of charitable and not-for-profit organisations including the Tas Bull Seafarers Foundation, Hunterlink and the ITF Seafarers Trust, as well as representing workers at the International Labor Organisation on maritime related labour governance matters.

Crumlin is also active in industry development and training, chairing Maritime Employee Training Limited and having served as a Director of Sydney Ports Corporation.

Noting his long-term support and interest in the framework of rights and support for people living with a disability and those injured at work, in 2008 Bill Shorten appointed Crumlin to the National Disability and Carer Council (NDACC), an advisory body that was consulted on during the planning and establishment of the National Disability Insurance Scheme.

In August 2023, the Australian Government appointed Crumlin to the Board of the Australian National Maritime Museum, where he will serve a three year term.

In November 2024, Crumlin was appointed to the board of Cbus, the Australian industry superannuation fund for construction workers and their families.

== Domestic union career ==
Crumlin went to sea in 1978. He has been a full-time union official since 1987 including Branch Secretary and Assistant National Secretary of the Seamen's Union of Australia and after amalgamation with the Waterside Workers' Federation of Australia in 1993, became the Deputy National Secretary and subsequently the National Secretary of the Maritime Union of Australia. Since the Maritime Union's amalgamation in 2018 with the CFMEU, Crumlin has continued to serve as the division's National Secretary. He served as the International President of the broader CFMEU from the 2018 amalgamation until May 2021 when he vacated that office to serve as National President.

Crumlin has wide involvement in the port authority, towage, shipping, hydrocarbon, diving, cruise ship and stevedoring industries in Australia and internationally.

== International Transport Workers' Federation ==
Crumlin was elected President of the International Transport Workers’ Federation (ITF) in August 2010 – a global union federation of 677 trade unions representing 19.7 million workers in 149 countries in the seafaring, port, road, rail and aviation sectors. In August 2006, he was elected as Chair of the Dockers Section of the ITF and is an Executive Member of the ITF. He has represented international seafarers at the International Labor Organisation on maritime conventions for over 15 years in a senior capacity Member of the Executive Board of the Australian Council of Trade Unions (ACTU).

In October 2024, at the ITF's 46th International Congress in Marrakech, Crumlin was elected to another term as President.
