= ITUC-Asia Pacific =

ITUC Asia Pacific
- ITUC Regional Organisation for Asia and Pacific
- Founded: 2007
- Location(s): Asia and Pacific Region
- Members: 30 million in 28 countries
- Key people: Felix Anthony, President; Shoya Yoshida, General Secretary
- Affiliations: ITUC
- Website: ituc-ap.org

The ITUC Regional Organisation for Asia and Pacific (ITUC Asia Pacific) is a regional organisation of the International Trade Union Confederation representing trade unions from countries in Asia and Oceania. It has 40 affiliated organisations in 28 countries, claiming a membership of 30 million people.

== History ==
The federation was founded in 2007, when the ICFTU-Asia Pacific Regional Organisation merged with the World Confederation of Labour's Brotherhood of Asian Trade Unions.

== Affiliates ==
The following national organisations are affiliated to ITUC Asia Pacific (ordered by country):

- Australia
  - Australian Council of Trade Unions
- Bangladesh
  - Bangladesh Free Trade Union Congress
  - Bangladesh Jatiyatabadi Sramik Dal
  - Bangladesh Labour Federation
  - Jatiya Sramik League
- Republic of China (Taiwan)
  - Chinese Federation of Labour
- Cook Islands
  - Cook Islands Workers Association Incorporated
- Fiji
  - Fiji Trades Union Congress
- French Polynesia
  - A Tia I Mua
- India
  - Confederation of Free Trade Unions of India
  - Hind Mazdoor Sabha
  - Self Employed Women's Association
  - Indian National Trade Union Congress
- Israel
  - General Federation of Labour in Israel
- Japan
  - Japanese Trade Union Confederation
- Jordan
  - The General Federation of Jordanian Trade Unions
- Kiribati
  - Kiribati Trades Union Congress
- South Korea
  - Federation of Korean Trade Unions
  - Korean Confederation of Trade Unions
- Malaysia
  - Malaysian Trades Union Congress
- Mongolia
  - Confederation of Mongolian Trade Unions
- Myanmar
  - Confederation of Trade Unions Myanmar - CTUM
- Nepal
  - Nepal Trade Union Congress
- New Caledonia
  - Union Des Syndicates des Oudriers et Employes de Nouvelle Caledonie
- New Zealand
  - New Zealand Council of Trade Unions
- Pakistan
  - All Pakistan Federation of Labour
  - All Pakistan Federation of Trade Unions
  - Pakistan National Federation of Trade Unions
- Papua New Guinea
  - Papua New Guinea Trade Union Congress
- Philippines
  - Trade Union Congress of the Philippines
  - Federation of Free Workers
- Samoa
  - Samoa Workers Congress
- Singapore
  - National Trades Union Congress
- Sri Lanka
  - Ceylon Workers' Congress
- Thailand
  - State Enterprises Workers' Relations Confederation-SERC
  - Labour Congress of Thailand
  - Thai Trade Union Congress
- Tonga
  - Friendly Islands Teachers' Association
- Turkey
  - Confederation of Revolutionary Trade Unions of Turkey
  - Confederation of Turkish Trade Unions
  - The Confederation of Turkish Real Trade Unions
  - Confederation of Public Servants Trade Unions
- Vanuatu
  - Vanuatu Council of Trade Unions

== Leadership ==
=== General Secretaries ===
2007: Noriyuki Suzuki
2017: Shoya Yoshida

=== Presidents ===
2007: Govindasamy Rajasekaran
2015: Felix Anthony
