= ICFTU Asia and Pacific Regional Organisation =

Former regional trade union organization

ITUC Asia Pacific
- ICFTU Asia and Pacific Regional Organisation
- Merged into: ITUC Regional Organisation for Asia and Pacific
- Founded: 1951
- Dissolved: 2007
- Headquarters: NTUC Centre, One Marina Boulevard, Singapore
- Location(s): Asia and Pacific Region
- Members: 30 million in 28 countries
- Affiliations: ICFTU
- Website: www.icftu-apro.org

The ICFTU Asia and Pacific Regional Organisation (APRO) was a regional organisation of the International Confederation of Free Trade Unions (ICFTU), representing trade unions from countries in Asia and Oceania.

== History ==
The federation was founded in May 1951 at a meeting in Karachi, as the Asian Regional Organisation. It was initially based in Calcutta, but moved to New Delhi in 1956, and then Singapore in 1988. In 1984 it changed its name to the ICFTU-Asia Pacific Regional Organisation. In 2007, following the merger of the ICFTU and the World Confederation of Labour (WCL), the organisation merged with the WCL's Brotherhood of Asian Trade Unions, to form the ITUC Regional Organisation for Asia and Pacific.

In 2006, the organisation described its aims thus:

The organisation seeks to bring about a just, welfare society with a higher standard of living. It believes that promoting a higher wage policy and the dignity and status of workers through a stronger trade union movement will help achieve this. Equipping workers with the skills to fight for fundamental rights, including the setting up of bona fide trade unions is perhaps its major undertaking. Under its current structure, ICFTU-APRO tackles education, information, social and economic policy, women, human and trade union rights and youth among its areas of work.

== Affiliates ==
The following national organisations were affiliated to ICFTU-APRO in 2006:

- Australia
  - Australian Council of Trade Unions
- Bangladesh
  - Bangladesh Free Trade Union Congress
  - Bangladesh Jatiyatabadi Sramik Dal
  - Bangladesh Labour Federation
  - Jatiya Sramik League
- Republic of China (Taiwan)
  - Chinese Federation of Labour
- Cook Islands
  - Cook Islands Workers Association Incorporated
- Fiji
  - Fiji Trades Union Congress
- French Polynesia
  - A Tia I Mua
- Hong Kong
  - Hong Kong Confederation of Trade Unions
  - Hong Kong & Kowloon Trades Union Council
- India
  - Hind Mazdoor Sabha
  - Indian National Trade Union Congress
- Israel
  - General Federation of Labour in Israel
- Japan
  - Japanese Trade Union Confederation
- Jordan
  - The General Federation of Jordanian Trade Unions
- Kiribati
  - Kiribati Trades Union Congress
- South Korea
  - Federation of Korean Trade Unions
  - Korean Confederation of Trade Unions
- Malaysia
  - Malaysian Trades Union Congress
- Mongolia
  - Confederation of Mongolian Trade Unions
- Nepal
  - Nepal Trade Union Congress
- New Caledonia
  - Union Des Syndicates des Oudriers et Employes de Nouvelle Caledonie
- New Zealand
  - New Zealand Council of Trade Unions
- Pakistan
  - All Pakistan Federation of Labour
  - All Pakistan Federation of Trade Unions
  - Pakistan National Federation of Trade Unions
- Papua New Guinea
  - Papua New Guinea Trade Union Congress
- Philippines
  - Trade Union Congress of Philippines
- Samoa
  - Samoa Trades Union Congress
- Singapore
  - National Trades Union Congress
- Sri Lanka
  - Ceylon Workers' Congress
- Thailand
  - Labour Congress of Thailand
  - Thai Trade Union Congress
- Tonga
  - Friendly Islands Teachers' Association
- Turkey
  - Confederation of Revolutionary Trade Unions of Turkey
  - Confederation of Turkish Trade Unions
  - The Confederation of Turkish Real Trade Unions
  - Confederation of Public Servants Trade Unions
- Vanuatu
  - Vanuatu Council of Trade Unions

== Leadership ==
=== General Secretaries ===
1951: Dhyan Mungat
1956: Govardhan Mapara
1966: V. S. Mathur
1988: Takashi Izumi
2000: Noriyuki Suzuki

=== Presidents ===
1953: Robert Edward Jayatilaka
1955: Jose J. Hernandez
1960: P. P. Narayanan
1965: Haruo Wada
1968: Minoru Takita
1969: P. P. Narayanan
1976: Devan Nair
1982: Tadanobu Usami
1988: Gopeshwar
1994: Ken Douglas
2000: Sharan Burrow
2005: Govindasamy Rajasekaran
