= Confederation of Free Trade Unions =

Confederation of Free Trade Unions may refer to:

- Confederation of Free Trade Unions (France)
- Confederation of Free Trade Unions (Mongolia)
- Confederation of Free Trade Unions of India
- Confederation of Free Trade Unions of Ukraine
- International Confederation of Free Trade Unions
