= Robert Edward Jayatilaka =

Ceylonese politician

Hon. Robert Edward Jayatilaka

Minister of Transport and Works
- In office 9 December 1959 – 20 March 1960
- Prime Minister: Wijeyananda Dahanayake
- Preceded by: Maithripala Senanayake
- Succeeded by: Montague Jayawickrama

Member of the Ceylon Parliament for Nawalapitiya
- In office 1952–1960
- Preceded by: K. Rajalingam
- Succeeded by: R. S. Pelpola

Personal details
- Born: Robert Edward Jayatilaka; 16 August 1911
- Party: Ceylon Labour Party
- Other political affiliations: Lanka Prajathanthravadi Pakshaya
- Spouse: Effie née Samarakkody
- Children: 5
- Education: Richmond College, Galle
- Occupation: politician

Robert Edward Jayatilaka (16 August 1911 – ??) was a Ceylonese politician.

== Education and teaching career ==
Robert Edward, also known as "Eric", Jayatilaka, attended Richmond College, Galle and, after qualifying as a teacher, taught for a number of years at S. Thomas' College, Mt. Lavinia. Jayatilaka was subsequently appointed as the principal of Anuruddha College, Kandy.

== Political career ==
He became a member of the Ceylon Labour Party, following which he was elected Chairman of the Nawalapitiya Urban Council.

In February 1943 he was appointed a member of the State Council, replacing N. M. Perera in the seat of Ruwanwella, after Perera and Philip Gunawardena were arrested and detained in Bombay in late 1942 and unable to fill their positions on the council. He was a supporter of C. W. W. Kannangara, the Minister of Education, in the State Council. When Kannangara moved the Free Education Bill, D. S. Senanayake, the leader of the State Council, and an avid opponent of the legislation, adjourned the House, with Jayatilaka opposing the adjournments stating:

"I am wondering why the Hon. Leader wanted the House adjourned... Sir, we have been discussing many questions. But when it comes to an important question - the education of the poor of this country - we want to put it off. I wonder and I want to know whether it is the 'old school tie brigade' trying to torpedo this scheme, because it has been said that powerful influences are trying to torpedo these Education Proposals." Hansard 1944 pp. 916-46).

The Free Education bill was ultimately passed when Senanayake was away in England negotiating for Independence.

At the first parliamentary election, held between 23 August 1947 and 20 September 1947, Jayatilake ran for parliament in the seat of Nawalapitiya, representing the Ceylon Labour Party. The result saw the election of the Ceylon India Congress candidate, K. Rajalingam, who received 7,933 votes to Jayatilaka's 6,491 votes, a margin of 1,442 votes.

He re-contested the electorate at the subsequent parliamentary elections, held between 24 May 1952 and 30 May 1952, where he was successful polling 4,995 votes (75% of the total vote) and 4,030 votes ahead of his nearest rival. He retained the seat at the 3rd parliamentary elections, held between 5 April 1956 and 10 April 1956, where he received 3,592 votes, (46% of the total vote) 631 votes ahead of the United National Party candidate, H. E. Wijesuriya.

In December 1959 Jayatilaka was appointed the Minister of Transport and Works in the Dahanayake cabinet, introducing the 'Podi Menike' express train, which ran between Hatton and Colombo. He also formed the Ceylon Chamber of Industries in Colombo, of which he was chairman for many years. He also declared open the Castlereigh Dam, which supplied water and hydro electric power to Nawalapitiya electoral district.

Following dissolution of the Ceylon Labour Party, Jayatilaka joined the Lanka Prajathanthravadi Pakshaya (Ceylon Democratic Party) but failed to win the Nawalapitiya election for a third time, at the 4th parliamentary election, held on 19 March 1960, losing to R. S. Pelpola, representing the newly created Sri Lanka Freedom Party, 4,200 votes and falling behind the United National Party candidate, T. A. Keerthinanda, 4,545 votes, only polling 2,707 votes. However, as the election left neither of the country's two major parties with a majority, another election was called. At the subsequent election, held in July that year, Jayatilaka ran again but only polled 1,731 votes (10% of the total vote) losing again to Pelpola, who received 8,600 (50% of the total vote).

He ran again at the 6th parliamentary election, held on 22 March 1965, however this time as an independent but again failing to get elected. Jayatilaka receiving 1,403 votes (5.5% of the total vote) as opposed to the successful United National Party representative, Chandra Karunaratne, he obtained 12,754 votes (50% of the total vote). In 1965, his civic rights were suspended for seven years following the enactment of the Imposition Of Civic Disabilities (Special Provisions) Act (No. 14 of 1965) based on the Thalagodapitiya Bribery Commission Report.

== Family ==
His wife, Effie née Samarakkody, (the younger sister of Lanka Sama Samaja Party leader, Edmund Samarakkody, and the former wife of Panini Ilangakoon), was elected as the Chairman of the Nawalapitiya Urban Council, the first female in the country to head an Urban Council. Anarkali Akarsha is his granddaughter.

== Legacy ==
In 2012 the President Mahinda Rajapaksa officially opened the R. E. Jayatilaka Sports Complex at Nawalapitiya in his memory.

Trade union offices
Preceded by Organisation founded	President of the ICFTU Asia and Pacific Regional Organisation; 1953–1955	Succeeded by Jose J. Hernandez
