= Johnny Tan =

Filipino trade unionist

President of the World Confederation of Labour
- In office 1981–1989

Personal details
- Born: October 10, 1922
- Died: September 8, 2005 (aged 82)
- Education: Ateneo de Manila University

Juan Cañizares Tan (October 10, 1922 – September 8, 2005), known as Johnny Tan, was a Filipino trade union leader.

Tan grew up in Manila, and attended the Ateneo de Manila High School. He began working closely with the Catholic priest Walter Hogan, and the two founded the Institute of Social Order in 1946, Tan becoming its secretary. The institute aimed to promote positive relations between workers and management. In 1950, Hogan and Tan decided to form a trade union federation, the Federation of Free Workers (FFW), with Tan becoming its president. It was soon followed by the Federation of Free Farmers.

The FFW supported a strike at the University of Santo Tomas, this leading to Hogan being exiled, and Tan becoming the leading figure in the organisation. For their role in organizing unions, Tan and his colleagues were soon tagged as communists. He regularly represented the FFW at the International Labour Organization and came to international prominence. In 1963, he became general secretary of the Brotherhood of Asian Trade Unionists, in 1974 becoming its president. In 1981, he was also elected as the president of the World Confederation of Labour, serving until 1989.

In the early 1990s, Fidel Ramos asked Tan to become Secretary of Labor and Employment, but Tan believed this would prevent him from taking an independent position. In 1994, he agreed to become chair of the Social Security System. In 1998, Tan suffered a stroke, standing down from his role in the FFW, and switching to become commissioner of the Social Security System. He remained president of the Brotherhood of Asian Trade Unionists, serving until his death in 2005.

Trade union offices
Preceded by New position	President of the Federation of Free Workers; 1950–1998	Succeeded by Ramon J. Jabar
Preceded by Tran Quoc Buu	President of the Brotherhood of Asian Trade Unions; 1974–2005	Succeeded by Anton Lodwick
Preceded by Marcel Pepin	President of the World Confederation of Labour; 1981–1989	Succeeded by Willy Peirens
