= Congress of Unions of Employees in the Public and Civil Services =

National trade union centre in Malaysia

CUEPACS
- Congress of Union of Employees in the Public and Civil Services
- Kongres Kesatuan Pekerja-Pekerja Di Dalam Perkhidmatan Awam
- Formation: 23 Oktober 1957
- Headquarters: Wisma CUEPACS, 34A, Jalan Gajah, Off Jalan Yew, Pudu, 55100 Kuala Lumpur, Malaysia
- Location: Malaysia
- Members: 1,200,000
- Key people: Adnan bin Mat, President; Abdul Rahman bin Nordin, Secretary General
- Website: www.cuepacs.my

The Congress of Union of Employees in the Public and Civil Services Malaysia (Malay: Kongres Kesatuan Pekerja-pekerja di dalam Perkhidmatan Awam Malaysia), abbreviated CUEPACS, is a national trade union centre in Malaysia. It has a membership of 1,200,000.

== Kepimpinan Semasa ==
As of 2023

- Pengerusi
  - Datuk Haji Adnan bin Mat
- Timbalan Pengerusi
  - Encik Aminuddin bin Awang
  - Puan Hjh Norhayati bt Abd Rashid
- Setiausaha Agung
  - Encik Abdul Rahman bin Nordin
- Timbalan Setiausaha Agung
  - Encik Mohd Fazli bin Mohd Noor
  - Encik Reostam bin Dzahar
  - Encik Mohd Zoo Asmani bin Mahmood
- Bendahari Agung
  - Encik Anuar bin Mamat
- Timbalan Bendahari Agung
  - Puan Rozimas binti Ismail

== Kesatuan Gabungan ==
1. Peninsular Malaysia Customs Officers Union, or Kesatuan Pegawai Kastam Semenanjung Malaysia (KPHKSM)
2. Kesatuan Penyediaan Makanan Hospital Semenanjung Malaysia
3. Kesatuan Pembantu Perangkaan Kerajaan Semenanjung Malaysia
4. Amalgamated Union of Employees in Government Clerical and Allied Services
5. Kesatuan Kakitangan Lembaga Tabung Angkatan Tentera
6. Kesatuan Pegawai-pegawai Hutan Melayu Semenanjung Malaysia
7. Kesatuan Pekerja-pekerja Perbadanan Kemajuan Negeri Selangor
8. Kesatuan Pekerja Bomba dan Penyelamat Semenanjung Malaysia
9. Kesatuan Pekerja-pekerja Jabatan Perhilitan Semenanjung Malaysia
10. Kesatuan Kakitangan Am Pusat Perubatan Universiti Malaya
11. Kesatuan Kakitangan Perkhidmatan Tadbir dan Awam Pasukan Polis Semenanjung Malaysia
12. Sarawak Medical Services Union
13. Kesatuan Pegawai-pegawai Kastam Sarawak
14. Kesatuan Juruteknologi Pergigian Malaysia
15. Kesatuan Pembantu Pembedahan Pergigian Semenanjung Malaysia
16. Kesatuan Perkhidmatan Teknik Semenanjung Malaysia
17. Kesatuan Kakitangan Lembaga Kemajuan Pertanian Kemubu
18. Malayan Nurses Union (MNU), or Kesatuan Jururawat Malaya
19. Kesatuan Pembantu Pertanian Semenanjung Malaysia
20. Kesatuan Pekerja Rendah Awam Kerajaan Negeri Perak Darul Ridzuan
21. Kesatuan Pekerja-pekerja Perdananan Kemajuan Negeri, Negeri Sembilan
22. Kesatuan Pekerja-pekerja Majlis Bandaraya Melaka Bersejarah
23. Kesatuan Pekerja-pekerja Lembaga Kemajuan Tanah Persekutuan (FELDA)
24. Kesatuan Kakitangan Am Universiti Teknologi Malaysia
25. Kesatuan Perkhidmatan Perkeranian Kerajaan Kelantan
26. Kesatuan Kakitangan Am Universiti Putra Malaysia
27. Kesatuan Penyelia Asrama Kementerian Kesihatan Semenanjung Malaysia
28. Kesatuan Pekerja-pekerja Kuasa-kuasa Tempatan Negeri Perak
29. Kesatuan Pegawai-pegawai Majlis Amanah Rakyat (MARA)
30. Persatuan Pegawai-pegawai Perkhidmatan Perhubungan Perusahaan Kementerian Sumber Manusia
31. Kesatuan Pegawai Kanan Pihak Berkuasa Kemajuan Pekebun Kecil Perusahaan Getah (RISDA)
32. Kesatuan Kakitangan Umum Universiti Teknologi MARA
33. Kesatuan Kebangsaan Pembantu Perawatan Kesihatan Semenanjung Malaysia
34. Kesatuan Kakitangan Lembaga Pemasaran Pertanian Persekutuan (FAMA)
35. Kesatuan Kebangsaan Kakitangan Majlis Amanah Rakyat (MARA)
36. Kesatuan Pembantu Veterinar Semenanjung Malaysia
37. Kesatuan Pekerja-pekerja Lembaga Kemajuan Pertanian Muda (MADA)
38. Kesatuan Pekerja-pekerja Keretapi Negeri Sabah
39. Kesatuan Pekerja-pekerja Awam Angkatan Tentera Malaysia
40. Kesatuan Buruh Majlis Bandaraya Pulau Pinang
41. Kesatuan Kakitangan Jabatan Pertanian Sarawak
42. Kesatuan Penolong Pegawai Penyediaan Makanan Kementerian Kesihatan Semenanjung Malaysia
43. Kesatuan Penolong Pegawai Kesihatan Persekitaran Sabah
44. Kesatuan Sekerja Kakitangan Majlis Agama Islam Kelantan
45. Kesatuan Kakitangan Am Institut Penyelidikan Dan Kemajuan Pertanian Malaysia (MARDI) Malaysia
46. Kesatuan Pembantu Tadbir Kesihatan Semenanjung Malaysia
47. Kesatuan Kebangsaan Pekerja-pekerja Jabatan Kerja Raya dan Air
48. Kesatuan Sekerja Kakitangan Makmal Kementerian Pendidikan Semenanjung Malaysia
49. Kesatuan Kebangsaan Pekerja-pekerja Pihak Berkuasa Tempatan Semenanjung Malaysia
50. Kesatuan Perkhidmatan Perguruan Kebangsaan Semenanjung Malaysia
51. Kesatuan Perkhidmatan Perubatan Sabah, or Sabah Medical Services Union (SMSU)
52. Kesatuan Pekerja-pekerja Kerajaan Kedah
53. Kesatuan Bidan-bidan dan Jururawat Desa Kerajaan Semenanjung Malaysia
54. Kesatuan Penyelenggara Setor Kerajaan
55. Kesatuan Pegawai Pengangkutan Jalan Semenanjung Malaysia
56. Persatuan Pengajar Jururawat Semenanjung Malaysia
57. Kesatuan Pekerja-pekerja Lembaga Getah Malaysia
58. Kesatuan Pekerja-pekerja Kerajaan Negeri Kelantan
59. Kesatuan Pembantu Operasi Perkhidmatan Awam Semenanjung Malaysia
60. Kesatuan Pekerja-pekerja Jabatan Kebajikan Masyarakat Malaysia Semenanjung Malaysia
61. Kesatuan Pekerja-pekerja Pihak Berkuasa Kemajuan Pekebun Kecil Perusahaan Getah (RISDA) Semenanjung Malaysia
62. Kesatuan Pekerja-pekerja Kerajaan Negeri Melaka
63. Kesatuan Inspektor Kesihatan Semenanjung Malaysia
64. Kesatuan Pekerja-pekerja Pengangkutan Majlis Amanah Rakyat (MARA) Malaysia Barat
65. Kesatuan Kakitangan Am Universiti Sains Malaysia
66. Kesatuan Pekerja-pekerja Lembaga Air Perak Darul Ridzuan
67. Kesatuan Kakitangan Pertubuhan Keselamatan Sosial
68. Kesatuan Kakitangan Perbadanan Pembangunan Pelaburan Malaysia (MIDA)
69. Kesatuan Pegawai-pegawai Penguatkuasa Kementerian Perdagangan Dalam Negeri dan Hal Ehwal Pengguna Malaysia
70. Kesatuan Kakitangan Universiti Utara Malaysia
71. Kesatuan Pegawai Eksekutif (KEPAK)
72. Kesatuan Kakitangan Akademik Universiti Teknologi MARA
73. Kesatuan Pemandu-pemandu Kementerian Kesihatan Semenanjung Malaysia
74. Kesatuan Pembantu Tadbir dan Pembantu Tadbir Rendah (Pendidikan) Semenanjung Malaysia
75. Kesatuan Jurubahasa-jurubahasa dan Penterjemah-penterjemah Kementerian Kehakiman Malaysia Barat
76. Kesatuan Kakitangan Am Lembaga Minyak Sawit Malaysia
77. Kesatuan Pekerja-pekerja Kerajaan Negeri Johor
78. Kesatuan Pegawai Eksekutif Lembaga Pemasaran Pertanian Persekutuan (FAMA)
79. Kesatuan Penolong Pegawai Pembangunan Masyarakat dan Pembantu Pembangunan Masyarakat Jabatan Perpaduan Negara dan Integriti Nasional Semenanjung Malaysia
80. Kesatuan Kakitangan Lembaga Tabung Haji
81. Sarawak Government Dental Employees' Union
82. Kesatuan Pekerja-pekerja Kumpulan Perusahaan dan Buruh Kasar Majlis Bandaraya Perbandaran dan Daerah Bahagian Kuching dan Samarahan
83. Kesatuan Pekerja Awam Kementerian Pertahanan Malaysia (KESATRIA Sarawak)
84. Kesatuan Pekerja-pekerja Gaji Hari dan IMG JKR Sarawak
85. Kesatuan Kakitangan Awam Polis Sarawak (SPOCSU)
86. Kesatuan Guru-guru Bumiputera Sarawak
87. Sibu Water Board Employees Union
88. Kesatuan Pekerja-pekerja Majlis Bandaraya Miri
89. Kesatuan Pembantu Makmal (Pelajaran) Negeri Sarawak (KESPEMS)
90. Kesatuan Sekerja Kakitangan Majlis Perbandaran Tawau
91. Kesatuan Pekerja-pekerja Jabatan Air Sabah
92. Kesatuan Sekerja Jabatan Laut Sabah
93. Kesatuan Sekerja Kastam Diraja Sabah
94. Kesatuan Pekerja-pekerja Jabatan Kerja Raya Sabah
95. Kesatuan Guru-guru Kerajaan Sabah
96. Kesatuan Juruteknik Jabatan Kerja Raya Sabah
97. Kesatuan Perkhidmatan Perbandaran Pulau Pinang
98. Kesatuan Pekerja Dewan Bandaraya Kuala Lumpur
99. Kesatuan Pekerja-pekerja Rendah Awam Pihak Berkuasa Tempatan Negeri Johor
100. Kesatuan Pekerja-Pekerja Rendah Awam Semenanjung Malaysia
101. Kesatuan Pekerja-pekerja Jabatan Pertanian Sabah
102. Kesatuan Perkhidmatan Kawalan Vektor Semenanjung Malaysia
103. Kesatuan Kakitangan Jabatan Hal Ehwal Orang Asli Semenanjung Malaysia
104. Kesatuan Anggota-anggota Jabatan Penerangan
105. Kesatuan Kakitangan Am Universiti Sains Malaysia
106. Kesatuan Kakitangan Am Universiti Kebangsaan Malaysia (KESUKMA)
107. Kesatuan Kakitangan Am Universiti Malaya

== See also ==
- Trade unions in Malaysia
