= Nawalapitiya Electoral District =

Electoral district of Sri Lanka that existed from 1947 to 1989

Nawalapitiya electoral district was an electoral district of Sri Lanka between August 1947 and February 1989. The district was named after the town of Nawalapitiya in Kandy District, Central Province. The 1978 Constitution of Sri Lanka introduced the proportional representation electoral system for electing members of Parliament. The existing 160 mainly single-member electoral districts were replaced with 22 multi-member electoral districts. Nawalapitiya electoral district was replaced by the Kandy multi-member electoral district at the 1989 general elections, the first under the proportional representation system.

== Members of Parliament ==
Key

Independent SLFP UNP

Election	Member	Party	Term
1947	K. Rajalingam	CIC	1947-1952
1952	Robert Edward Jayatilaka	Independent	1952-1956
1956	Robert Edward Jayatilaka	Independent	1956-1960
1960 (March)	R. S. Pelpola	SLFP	1960
1960 (July)	R. S. Pelpola	SLFP	1960-1965
1965	Chandra Karunaratne	UNP	1965-1970
1970	M. S. Aluthgamage	SLFP	1970-1977
1977	Chandra Karunaratne	UNP	1977-1989

== Elections ==
=== 1947 Parliamentary General Election ===
Results of the 1st parliamentary election held between 23 August 1947 and 20 September 1947:

Candidate	Party	Symbol	Votes	%
K. Rajalingam	Ceylon India Congress	Cartwheel	7,933	49.97
Robert Edward Jayatilaka	Ceylon Labour Party	Umbrella	6,491	40.58
A. H. de Silva	Independent	Elephant	787	4.92
S. N. Ponniah	Independent	Hand	336	2.10
Valid Votes			15,547	97.19
Rejected Votes			450	2.81
Total Polled			15,997	100.00
Registered Electors			22,580	
Turnout				70.85

=== 1952 Parliamentary General Election ===
Results of the 2nd parliamentary election held between 24 May 1952 and 30 May 1952:

Candidate	Party	Symbol	Votes	%
Robert Edward Jayatilaka	Ceylon Labour Party	Star	4,955	74.79
Don Peter Setunga	Independent	Elephant	965	14.45
K. Shelton de Silva	Lanka Sama Samaja Party	Umbrella	709	10.62
Valid Votes			6,629	99.25
Rejected Votes			50	0.75
Total Polled			6,679	100.00
Registered Electors			10,082	
Turnout				66.25

=== 1956 Parliamentary General Election ===
Results of the 3rd parliamentary election held between 5 April 1956 and 10 April 1956:

Candidate	Party	Symbol	Votes	%
Robert Edward Jayatilaka	Ceylon Labour Party	Hand	3,592	46.09
H. E. Wijesuriya	United National Party	Elephant	2,961	37.99
S. Marasinghe		Key	1,193	15.31
Valid Votes			7,746	99.38
Rejected Votes			48	0.62
Total Polled			7,794	100.00
Registered Electors			10,950	
Turnout				71.18

=== 1960 (March) Parliamentary General Election ===
Results of the 4th parliamentary election held on 19 March 1960:

Candidate	Party	Symbol	Votes	%
R. S. Pelpola	Sri Lanka Freedom Party	Hand	7,200	40.52
T. A. Keerthinanda	United National Party	Elephant	4,545	25.58
Robert Edward Jayatilaka	Lanka Prajathanthravadi Pakshaya	Umbrella	2,707	15.23
S. Marasinghe		Key	2,198	12.37
P. A. D. Perera		Clock	776	4.37
Sudharma Podiralaham		Book	103	0.58
Valid Votes			17,529	98.65
Rejected Votes			240	1.35
Total Polled			17,769	100.00
Registered Electors			23,020	
Turnout				77.19

=== 1960 (July) Parliamentary General Election ===
Results of the 5th parliamentary election held on 20 July 1960:

Candidate	Party	Symbol	Votes	%
R. S. Pelpola	Sri Lanka Freedom Party	Hand	8,600	49.57
Chandra Karunaratne	United National Party	Elephant	6,874	39.62
Robert Edward Jayatilaka	Lanka Prajathanthravadi Pakshaya	Umbrella	1,731	9.98
Valid Votes			17,205	99.18
Rejected Votes			143	0.82
Total Polled			17,348	100.00
Registered Electors			23,020	
Turnout				75.36

=== 1965 Parliamentary General Election ===
Results of the 6th parliamentary election held on 22 March 1965:

Candidate	Party	Symbol	Votes	%
Chandra Karunaratne	United National Party	Elephant	12,754	50.20
R. S. Pelpola	Sri Lanka Freedom Party	Hand	10,873	42.80
Robert Edward Jayatilaka	Independent	Chair	1,403	5.52
Valid Votes			25,030	98.52
Rejected Votes			376	1.48
Total Polled			25,406	100.00
Registered Electors			30,422	
Turnout				83.51

=== 1970 Parliamentary General Election ===
Results of the 7th parliamentary election held on 27 May 1970:

Candidate	Party	Symbol	Votes	%
M. S. Aluthgamage	Sri Lanka Freedom Party	Hand	16,774	54.41
Chandra Karunaratne	United National Party	Elephant	13,672	44.35
A. R. M. Abdul Cader		Bell	92	0.30
Valid Votes			30,541	99.07
Rejected Votes			286	0.93
Total Polled			30,827	100.00
Registered Electors			35,901	
Turnout				85.87

=== 1977 Parliamentary General Election ===
Results of the 8th parliamentary election held on 21 July 1977:

Candidate	Party	Symbol	Votes	%
Chandra Karunaratne	United National Party	Elephant	20,946	61.87
M. S. Aluthgamage	Sri Lanka Freedom Party	Hand	11,739	34.67
Sugathapala Wimalaratne		Star	950	2.81
M. P. John		Flower	129	0.38
A. Ramanathan		Eye	92	0.27
Valid Votes			33,770	99.75
Rejected Votes			86	0.25
Total Polled			33,856	100.00
Registered Electors			39,569	
Turnout				85.56
