= Govindasamy Rajasekaran =

Govindasamy Rajasekaran (1941 or 1942 – 6 August 2023) was a Malaysian trade union leader.

Rajasekaran was the founding general secretary of the Malaysian Metal Industry Employees' Union in 1963. The union is affiliated with the Malaysian Trade Union Congress, of which Rajasekaran was elected as deputy general secretary in 1980, and then general secretary in 1992.

Rajasekaran served as MTUC secretary-general from 1992 to 2010 and often worked alongside another veteran trade unionist, former MTUC president Zainal Rampak.

The MTUC was also affiliated with the International Confederation of Free Trade Unions (ICFTU), and Rajasekaran was elected as president of the ICFTU Asia and Pacific Regional Organisation in 2005.

Under his leadership, it merged with the Brotherhood of Asian Trade Unions to form the ITUC-Asia Pacific, and Rajasekaran remained president until his retirement in 2015.

Rajasekaran died aged 81, on 6 August 2023.

Trade union offices
Preceded by V. David	General Secretary of the Malaysian Trade Union Congress; 1992–2011	Succeeded by Abdul Halim Mansor
Preceded by Sharan Burrow	President of the ICFTU Asia and Pacific Regional Organisation; 2005–2007	Succeeded by Federation merged
Preceded by New position	President of the ITUC-Asia Pacific; 2007–2015	Succeeded by Felix Anthony
