= Haruo Wada =

Japanese trade unionist and politician

- 和田 春生

Member of the House of Councillors
- In office 8 July 1974 – 1979
- Constituency: National district

Member of the House of Representatives
- In office 27 December 1969 – 13 November 1972
- Preceded by: Shōzō Hasegawa
- Succeeded by: Shōzō Hasegawa
- Constituency: Tokyo 7th

Personal details
- Born: 15 March 1919 Tokyo, Japan
- Died: 17 October 1999 (aged 80) Nishinomiya, Hyōgo, Japan
- Party: Democratic Socialist
- Education: Toba National College of Maritime Technology

Haruo Wada (Japanese: 和田春生; 15 March 1919 – 17 October 1999) was a Japanese trade unionist and politician.

Wada joined the Japanese Merchant Navy in 1939. He was a founding member of the All-Japan Seamen's Union in 1945. Starting in 1948, he worked full-time for the union as an organizer. In 1950, he was a founding member of the General Council of Trade Unions of Japan, and worked for it as a permanent secretary. He was opposed to its increasingly left-wing stance. In 1954, he helped found the All-Japan Trade Union Congress (Zenro) split, and was appointed as its general secretary. In 1964, Zenro became part of the Japanese Confederation of Labour, and he became its vice president. In 1965, he additionally served as president of the ICFTU Asia and Pacific Regional Organisation, and served until his resignation in 1968.

Wada was a member of the Democratic Socialist Party, and in 1969 he was elected to the House of Representatives, serving until 1972. From 1974 until 1979, he served in the House of Councillors.

Trade union offices
Preceded by New position	General Secretary of the All-Japan Trade Union Congress; 1954–1964	Succeeded by Federation merged
Preceded by P. P. Narayanan	President of the ICFTU Asia and Pacific Regional Organisation; 1965–1968	Succeeded by Minoru Takita
