= JSU =

JSU may refer to:

- All-Japan Seamen's Union, a trade union in Japan
- The IATA airport code for Maniitsoq Airport in Maniitsoq, Greenland
- Jackson State University, a public university in Jackson, Mississippi
- Jacksonville State University, a public university in Jacksonville, Alabama
- Jewish Student Union
- Jiangsu University, a public university in Zhenjiang, Jiangsu
- Juventudes Socialistas Unificadas, an organisation during the Spanish Civil War
- Jsu Garcia, an American actor
