= Fīnau Tūtone =

Tongan educator, civil servant, and activist

Fīnau Hevaha Tūtone (1938 or 1939 — 5 June 2021) was a Tongan educator, civil servant, and pro-democracy activist. He was a founder of the Friendly Islands Teachers' Association and the Tonga Public Service Association.

Tūtone was educated at Tupou College and worked as a teacher. He later attended the University of the South Pacific where he was a member of a group of Tonga activists promoting political reform and democracy.

He was the Human Rights and Democracy Movement's candidate in the 2005 Tongatapu by-election.

In July 2005 he became the first president of the newly-formed Tonga Public Service Association and was a leader of the 2005 Tongan public service strike. He later served as president of the Friendly Islands Teachers Association.

Following the 2010 Tongan general election he called for limits on the king's veto powers. He was later appointed as a member of the Public Service Commission, but resigned in October 2014.
