= Kaiin =

Kaiin is the name of:

- All-Japan Seamen's Union
- A place in The Dying Earth
