= 2005 Tongatapu by-election =

The Tongatapu by-election of 2005 was a by-election held to elect a new People's Representative to the Tongan Legislative Assembly. The vacancy occurred following the appointment of the incumbent, Feleti Sevele, to cabinet. The by-election was won by former Police Minister Clive Edwards.

Tongatapu by-election, 5 May 2005 (1 member)
Party	Candidate	Votes	%	±%
PDP	Clive Edwards	5459	38.3	
Independent	Finau Hevaha Tutone	4735	33.2	
Independent	Mateitalo F. Mahu'inga	1856	13.0	
Independent	Fuiva Ruby Adeline Kavaliku	840	5.9	
Independent	Semisi Kailahi	305	2.1	
Independent	Vikiami Kini Mangisi	196	1.4	
Independent	Alisi Pone Fotu	129	0.9	
Independent	Nalesoni Leka	107	0.8	
Independent	Isikeli Vave	97	0.7	
Independent	Semisi Tupou	90	0.6	
Independent	Fonongaika Tu'ipeatau	86	0.6	
Independent	Semisi P. I. Tapueluelu	85	0.6	
Independent	Kamipeli Tofa'imala'e'aloa	68	0.5	
Independent	Kaio Vehikite	64	0.4	
Independent	Siosaia Kamea	45	0.3	
Independent	Aisake Fa'alongo Filimone	30	0.2	
Independent	Pita Uikilotu	26	0.2	
Independent	Hoatatau Tenisi	25	0.2	
Turnout		14243	100.0	
PDP gain from HRDM		Swing		

Results from Matangi Tonga.
