= Zensendomei =

Trade union in Japan

Zensendomei (Japanese: ゼンセン同盟) was a trade union representing workers in light manufacturing and service industries.

The union was founded in July 1946, as the Japan Federation of Textile Workers' Unions, and it affiliated to the General Federation of Japanese Trade Unions. In 1950, it moved to the new All-Japan Trade Union Congress, and then in 1964 to its successor, the Japanese Confederation of Labour. By 1967, it was the federation's largest affiliate, and the third-largest union in Japan, with 505,461 members. It proved influential in the confederation, and in 1980, its president, Tadanobu Usami, became the confederation's president.

In 1969, the union absorbed a number of other unions which represented supermarket workers. It soon began representing workers in the wholesale trade, and by the mid-1990s was considered unique among Japanese unions in employing large numbers of organisers, and negotiating pay and conditions on an industry-wide basis.

The union became known for the large proportion of members who were women, although most of its organisers and staff members were men. Despite its large membership, the union was often regarded as weak and uncombative, and in later years, it struggled with declining employment in the textile industry.

In 2002, the union merged with the Japanese Federation of Chemical, Service and General Trade Unions and the small Japan Federation of Textile and Clothing Workers' Unions, to form the Japanese Federation of Textile, Chemical, Food, Commercial, Service and General Workers' Unions.

== Presidents ==
1948: Minoru Takita
1971: Tadanobu Usami
1988: Jinnosuke Ashida
1996: Tsuyoshi Takagi
