= Brotherhood of Asian Trade Unions =

Asian trade union federation

The Brotherhood of Asian Trade Unions (BATU) was a federation bringing together trade unionists in Asia.

== History ==
The federation was established on 20 December 1963, at a conference in Manila. It was a regional federation of the International Federation of Christian Trade Unions, with the Federation of Free Workers being its leading affiliate. By 1974, it had affiliates from 9 countries, representing a total of 5 million members.

In September 2007, it merged with the ICFTU Asia and Pacific Regional Organisation to form the ITUC Regional Organisation for Asia and Pacific.

== Leadership ==
=== General Secretaries ===
1963: Johnny Tan
1974:
Necie Lucero

=== Presidents ===
1963: Trivedi Parmanand
1965: Tran Quoc Buu
1974: Johnny Tan
2015: Anton Lodwick
