= Sharan Burrow =

Australian trade unionist (born 1954)

Sharan Burrow AC
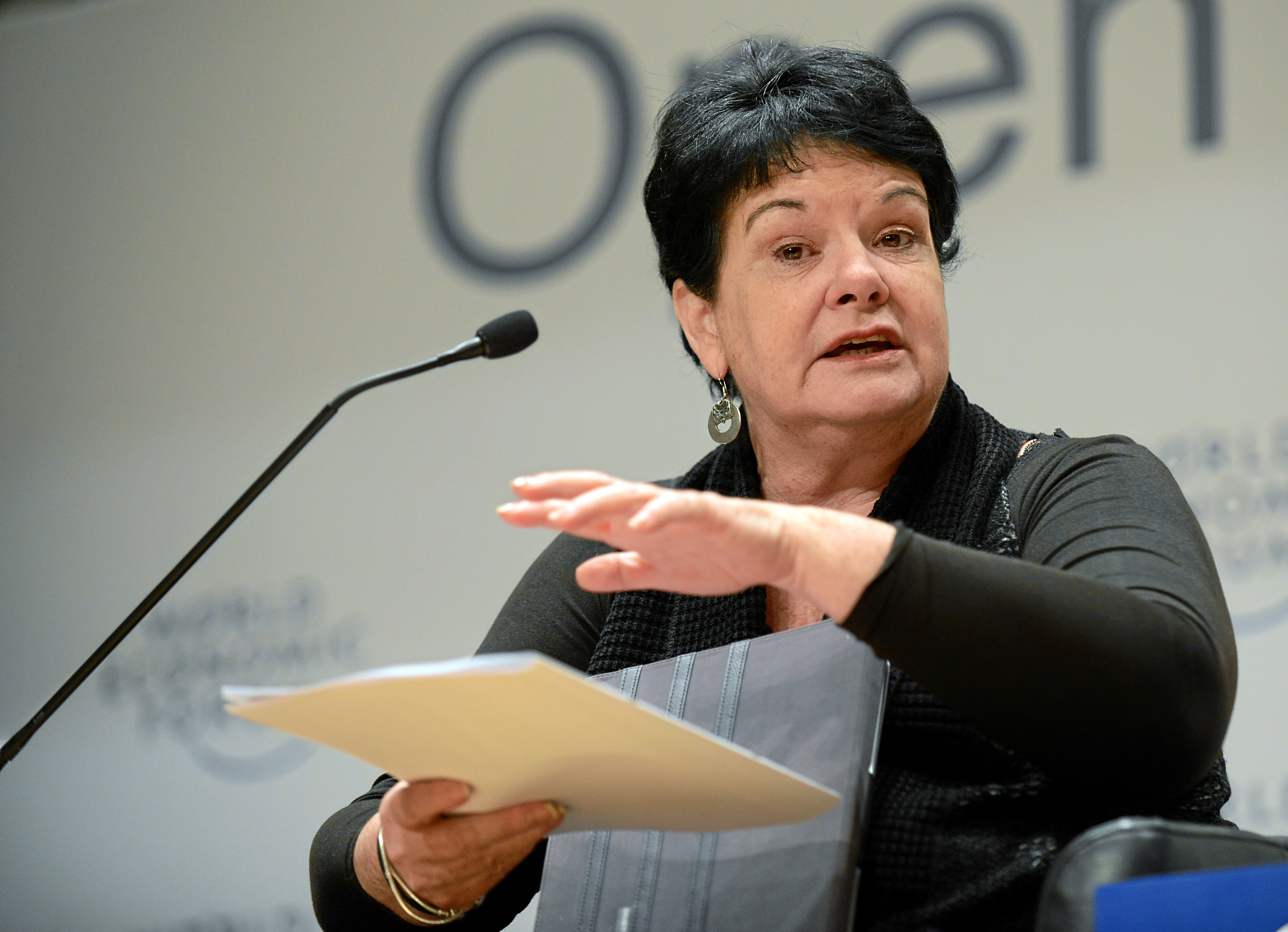
- Burrow speaking at the 2013 World Economic Forum meeting

2nd General Secretary of the International Trade Union Confederation
- In office June 2010 – November 2022
- Preceded by: Guy Ryder
- Succeeded by: Luca Visentini

9th President of the Australian Council of Trade Unions
- In office 2000–2010
- Preceded by: Jennie George
- Succeeded by: Ged Kearney

1st President of the International Trade Union Confederation
- In office November 2006 – June 2010
- Preceded by: new office
- Succeeded by: Michael Sommer

President of the International Confederation of Free Trade Unions
- In office 2004–2006
- Preceded by: Fackson Shamenda
- Succeeded by: organisation abolished

President of the Australian Education Union
- In office 1992–2000

Personal details
- Born: 12 December 1954 (age 71) Warren, New South Wales, Australia
- Party: Labor
- Education: University of New South Wales
- Profession: Teacher

Sharan Leslie Burrow AC (born 12 December 1954) is an Australian trade unionist who served as the general secretary of the International Trade Union Confederation (ITUC) from 2010 to 2022 and as president of the Australian Council of Trade Unions (ACTU) from 2000 to 2010. She was the first woman to become General Secretary of the ITUC since its foundation in 2006, and was the second woman to become President of the ACTU.

== Early involvement in Australian labour movement ==
Burrow was born in Warren, New South Wales to a family with strong involvement in the labour movement. She graduated in teaching with the University of New South Wales in 1976 and became a teacher in the early 1980s, which allowed her to become involved in the New South Wales Teachers Federation. She later became President of the Bathurst Trades and Labor Council. Before becoming President of the ACTU she was also President of the Australian Education Union (AEU) in 1992.

== Presidency of the Australian Council of Trade Unions ==
Burrow was elected President of the ACTU in May 2000. The most significant public event of her term of office was the ACTU's 'Your Rights at Work' campaign against the Howard government's 'WorkChoices' industrial relations legislation in the lead up to the 2007 Australian federal election. At the election, the Howard government was defeated, and the incoming Rudd government repealed the WorkChoices legislation and replaced it with the Fair Work Act 2009, which was praised by the ACTU for its restoration and protection of many workers' rights (such as the right to organise and negotiate collectively) which has been removed or jeopardised by the earlier legislation.

At the time of her presidency with ACTU, a PPL (Paid Parental Leave) policy program was passed in Australia, for which she said; this would give dignity and respect to women workers.

Burrow continued as President of the ACTU until the end of June 2010 when she demitted office and was elected General Secretary (i.e. leader) of the International Trade Union Confederation.

== Involvement in international labour movement ==
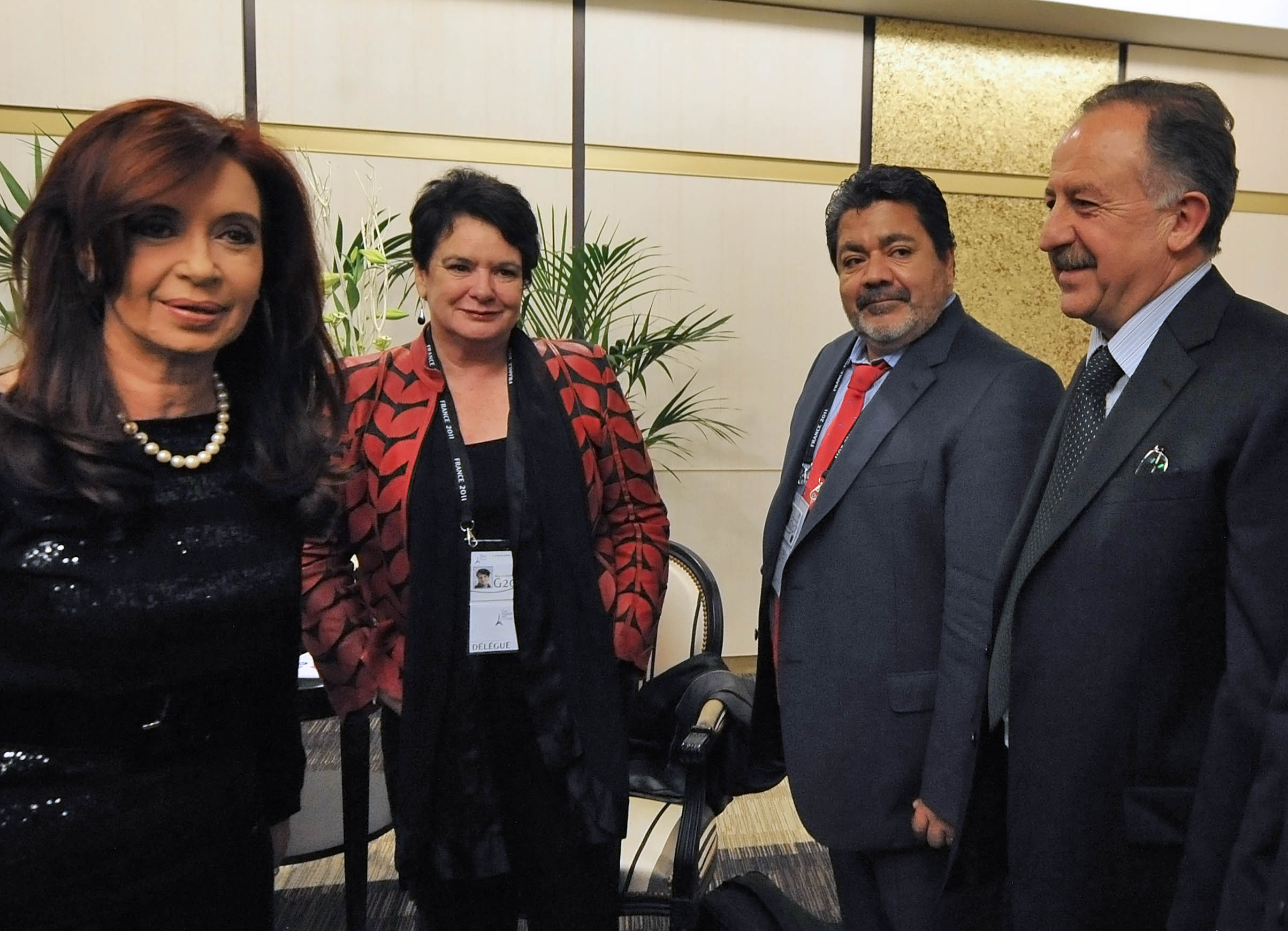
Burrow in a meeting with the president of Argentina and two unionists from that country, in Cannes in 2011

Before her election as General Secretary of the International Trade Union Confederation on 25 June 2010,

Burrow was President of the ITUC from its foundation in 2006 until her election as General Secretary in 2010 and had previously been the first female President of the International Confederation of Free Trade Unions (ICFTU), a forerunner institution of the ITUC, between 2004 and its absorption into the ITUC in 2006.

Recognising the significance of her election as the first female leader of the world's largest international trade union organisation, in her acceptance speech after becoming General Secretary of the ITUC, Burrow underlined the necessity of female participation in organised labour:

I am a warrior for women and we still have work to ensure the inclusion of women in the work place and in our unions. The struggles for women are multiple – too often within their families for independence, then in the workplace for rights and equal opportunity, in their unions for access and representation and then as union leaders. But the investment in and participation of women is not only a moral mandate it is an investment in democracy and a bulwark against fundamentalism and oppression. Organising women is and must continue to be a priority for the ITUC.

Since 2014, Burrow has been a member of the Global Commission for the Economy and Climate, co-chaired by Ngozi Okonjo-Iweala, Nicholas Stern and Paul Polman.

== Other activities ==
=== Corporate boards ===
- Danone, Member of the Mission Committee (since 2020)

=== Non-profit organizations ===
- International Centre for Trade Union Rights (ICTUR), President
- European Climate Foundation, Member of the Supervisory Board
- World Justice Project, Honorary Co-Chair
- The B Team, Vice-Chair
- World Resources Institute, Member of the Global Board of Directors

Trade union offices
Preceded by Jennie George	President of the Australian Council of Trade Unions; 2000–2010	Succeeded by Ged Kearney
Preceded by Ken Douglas	President of the ICFTU Asia and Pacific Regional Organisation; 2000–2005	Succeeded by Govindasamy Rajasekaran
Preceded by New position	President of the International Trade Union Confederation; 2006–2010	Succeeded by Michael Sommer
Preceded by Guy Ryder	General Secretary of the International Trade Union Confederation; 2010–2022	Succeeded by Luca Visentini
