= Singapore Federation of Trade Unions =

The Singapore Federation of Trade Unions was a trade union centre in Singapore. It was founded in October 1945 as the Singapore General Labour Union on the initiative of the Malayan Communist Party. SGLU was the first unit of the Malayan General Labour Union, which expanded throughout Malaya. SGLU was reconstituted as SFTU in August 1946, as the Malayan General Labour Union was divided into the SFTU and the Pan-Malayan Federation of Trade Unions.

Politically, SFTU was tied to the Malayan Communist Party. The SFTU Central Executive Committee was dominated by Chinese MCP cadres. However, SFTU was able to recruit non-communist anti-colonial labour unionists amongst the Indian community. For example, SFTU vice president P. Veerasenan and leader of the Singapore Harbour Board Labour Union was a prominent Indian non-communist union leader. SFTU had virtually no presence amongst the Malay community.

By mid-1947, SFTU counted with 72 affiliated unions, out of a total of 126 unions in Singapore. The total membership of SFTU-affiliated unions stood at above 56,000.

In 1948, the tactics of SFTU changed. SFTU initiated a number of strikes, including a general strike on 23 April 1948. These measures largely backfired, and after a call for mobilisations for 1 May 1948 the British authorities declared Emergency and clamped down heavily on SFTU. After the ban on the Malayan Communist Party in June 1948, many SFTU unions were dissolved.

SFTU was deregistered by the British authorities in December 1948.
