= All-Japan Trade Union Congress =

Japanese national trade union federation

The All-Japan Trade Union Congress (Japanese: 全日本労働組合会議), better known by its Japanese abbreviation Zenrō) was a national trade union federation that existed in Japan from 1954 to 1964.

== History ==
Zenrō was established in 1954 by a number of unions on the right wing of the trade union movement, who had become unhappy with the increasingly left-wing political stance of the General Council of Trade Unions of Japan (Sōhyō) under the leadership of its militant secretary-general Minoru Takano. Politically speaking, Zenrō was tied closely to the Right Socialist Party (RSP), to whom it provided electoral support, and following the reunification of the Japan Socialist Party (JSP) in 1955, supported the former RSP factions in the new party, especially the far-right faction led by Suehiro Nishio.

Although Zenrō generally shied away from political actions and even purely economic strikes, preferring a more conciliatory relationship with management, the federation did participate in the successful struggle in 1958 to defeat the revision of the Police Duties Bill proposed by conservative prime minister Nobusuke Kishi, which opponents were able to portray as less of a left-right issue and more of a basic threat to Japanese democracy and civil rights.

However, Zenrō was less enthusiastic about supporting the 1960 Anpo protests against the US-Japan Security Treaty, and ultimately pulled out of the movement when the JSP insisted that the Japan Communist Party be allowed to participate. This controversial decision also caused Nishio and the other right socialists to bolt the JSP and form the new Democratic Socialist Party, which Zenrō thereafter supported. Not that the left socialists and Sōhyō were necessarily sorry to see Zenrō and Nishio gone, as Zenrō had purchased Sōhyō's enmity by repeatedly attempting to hive off Zenrō-affiliated "second unions" within Sōhyō-controlled shop floors.

In 1964, Zenrō merged with the National Council of Government and Public Workers' Unions (Zenkankō) and the Japanese Federation of Labour (Sōdōmei), to form the Japanese Confederation of Labour, better known as Dōmei.

== Affiliates ==
The following unions were affiliated in 1956.

Name	Abbreviation	Membership (1956)
All-Japan Seamen's Union	Kaiin	83,693
Chubu Electric Power Workers' Union	Chubu Denro	16,000
Chugoku Electric Power Workers' Union	Chugoku Denro	9,089
Federation of Japan Automobile Workers' Unions	Jidosha Roren	12,000
Japanese Federation of Labour	Sodomei	420,000
Japan Garrison Forces Workers' Union	Nitchuro	25,000
Kansai Electric Power Workers' Union	Kansai Denro	22,300
National Cinema and Theatre Workers' Union	Zen Eien	2,700
National Federation of Textile Industry Workers' Unions	Zensendomei	320,000
Shikoku Electric Power Workers' Union	Shikoku Denro	5,816
Tohoku Electric Power Workers' Union	Tohoku Denro	14,089

== Leadership ==
President: Minoru Takita
General Secretary: Haruo Wada
