= José J. Hernández =

Filipino trade union leader

José J. Hernández (1911 – 20 September 1972) was a Filipino trade union leader.

Born in Manila, Hernández first organised a trade union when he was twenty years old. He became national secretary of the National Labor Union in 1938. He served in the armed forces during World War II, then became a journalist and completed a law degree at the Far Eastern University. He then returned to his role at the National Labor Union. In 1954, he became the founding general secretary of the Philippine Trade Unions Council. He also served on the executive of the International Confederation of Free Trade Unions, and from 1955 to 1960, he served as president of the ICFTU Asia and Pacific Regional Organisation.

Trade union offices
Preceded by Robert Edward Jayatilaka	President of the ICFTU Asia and Pacific Regional Organisation; 1955–1960	Succeeded by P. P. Narayanan
