= National Union of Plantation Workers =

Trade union in Malaysia

NUPW
- National Union of Plantation Workers
- Founded: 1954
- Headquarters: No. 428, A-B Jalan 5/46, Gasing Indah, 46000 Petaling Jaya, Selangor
- Location: Malaysia
- Affiliations: Malaysian Trade Union Congress (MTUC)

The National Union of Plantation Workers (NUPW) is the largest union in Malaysia and one of the largest in Asia.

== History ==
The union was formed in the Federation of Malaya in 1954 by an amalgamation of smaller plantation unions. It continues to represent manual laborers and semi-skilled workers in all of Peninsular Malaysia. Ethnically, its membership has historically been of predominantly Indian origin, reflecting the workforce in the industry.

An assessment of the NUPW's record as of 1996 concluded that it had made contributions to the welfare of its members, such as subsidising adult education and school education for members' children, and through campaigning against alcohol abuse; and also had some positive impact on pay, albeit largely tied to productivity bonuses. However, it struggled to respond to the restructuring of estates, often used by employers to undermine workers' rights, invested in numerous unsuccessful businesses, and spent an excessive proportion of funds on union employees.

P. P. Narayanan was the general secretary of the NUPW from 1954 until 1993. The present executive secretary is A. Navamukundan.

== General Secretaries ==
1954: P. P. Narayanan
1992: Datuk G. Sankaran
