= Tadanobu Usami =

Japanese trade union leader (1925–2011)

Tadanobu Usami (Japanese: 宇佐美忠信; 31 October 1925 – 10 November 2011) was a Japanese trade union leader.

Born in Tokyo, Usami was educated at the Takachiho College of Economics. In 1946, he began working at the Fuji Cotton Spinning Company. Later in the year, he moved to work full-time for the new Japan Federation of Textile Workers' Unions. He served on the union's Central Executive Committee from 1947, became Assistant General Secretary in 1955, General Secretary in 1961, and President in 1971.

In 1972, Usami additionally became vice president of the Japanese Confederation of Labour, serving as president from 1980. The same year, he was elected as president of the ICFTU Asia and Pacific Regional Organisation.

Usami died of pneumonia in November 2011.

Trade union offices
Preceded by Minoru Takita	President of Zensendomei; 1971–1988	Succeeded by Jinnosuke Ashida
Preceded by Seiji Amaike	President of the Japanese Confederation of Labour; 1980–1987	Succeeded by Federation merged
Preceded by Devan Nair	President of the ICFTU Asia and Pacific Regional Organisation; 1982–1988	Succeeded by Jamshedpur Gopeshwar
