= P. P. Narayanan =

Malaysian trade unionist (1923-1996)

Dr. P. P. Narayanan
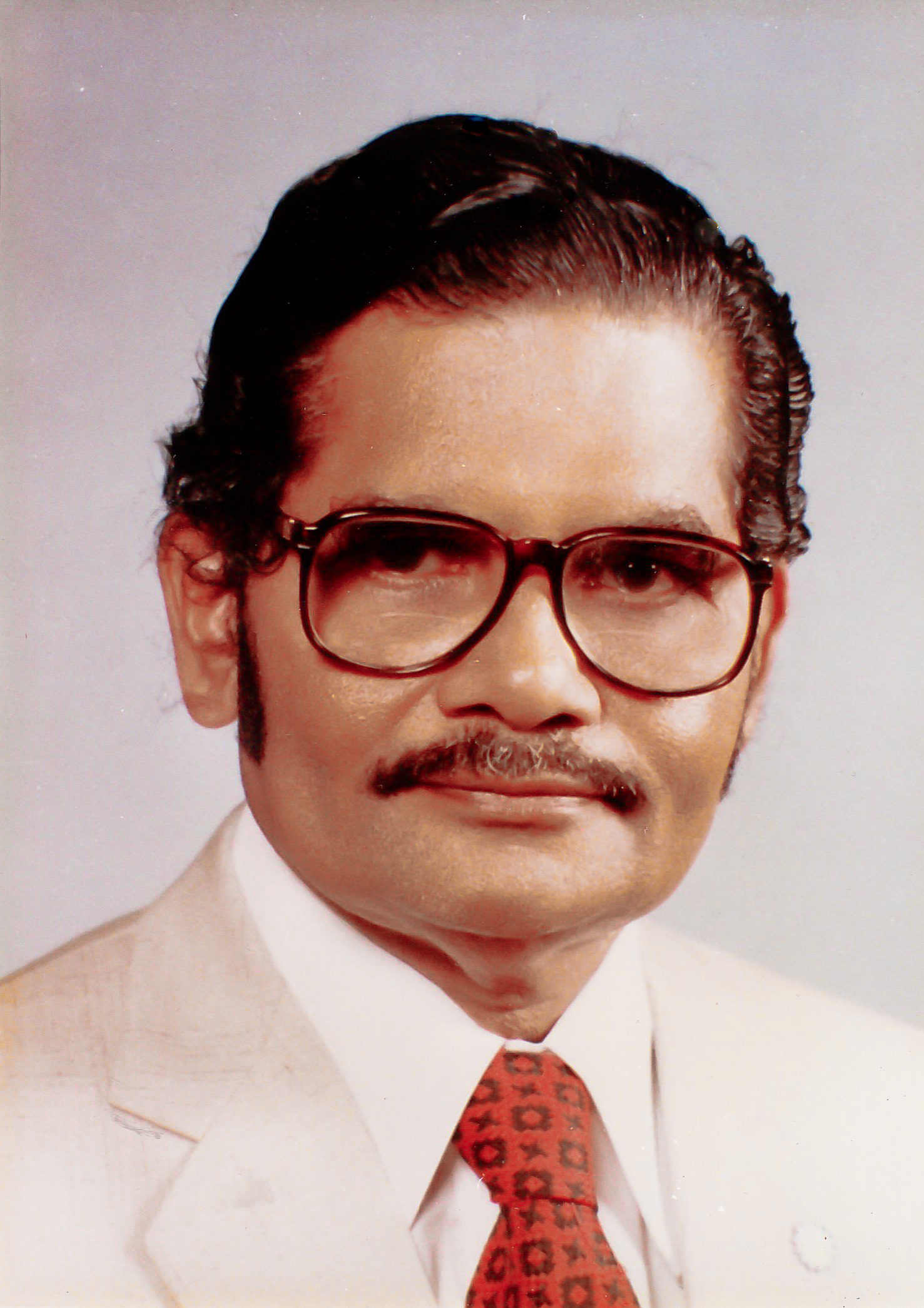
- Born: 15 February 1923; Tholanur, British Raj
- Died: 19 February 1996 (aged 73); Petaling Jaya, Selangor, Malaysia
- Citizenship: Malaysia
- Years active: 1943–1994
- Spouse: M. K. Dakshayani
- Children: Vinodini, Suresh, Sivadas, Prem, Sujatha
- Parents: Chettur Narayanan Nair (father); Palayil Janaki Amma (mother)

Palayil Pathazhapurayil Narayanan (15 February 1923 – 19 February 1996) was a Malaysian trade unionist.

== Early childhood and education ==
Narayanan was born during the British Raj on 15 February 1923, in Tholanur, present day Palakkad District, Kerala, India, then part of the Madras Presidency. His parents were Palayil Janaki Amma and Chettur Narayanan Nair, who was the nephew of (Sir) Chettur Sankaran Nair.

P. P. Narayanan got his family name, Palayil Pathazhapurayil, through matrilineal succession.

He moved to Malaya to further his education, where he completed the Malayan Senior Cambridge Examination in 1940 and enrolled in the Technical College in Kuala Lumpur, intending to become an electrical engineer. However, he had to discontinue the course due to lack of funds and the Japanese invasion of Malaya in December 1941 during World War II.

Forced to work, instead of study, he found employment in 1942 as a daily-rated winchman in a tin mine (The Rawang Tin Fields) in Rawang, Selangor, collecting a wage of one Straits dollar a day. Here he had his first direct contact with manual laborers and saw how they were eking out a meagre existence with little chance to improve their lot. To remind him of those days of hardship, Narayanan carried with him a small payslip from the mine until his passing.

In mid-1943, Subhas Chandra Bose visited Malaya, attracting "vast crowds, not solely comprised of Indians, [who] flocked to attend what were perhaps the largest political gatherings hitherto held in the country." Narayanan traveled to Kuala Lumpur to hear Netaji and was completely inspired by his speech canvassing moral and material support for the Indian National Army (INA). Narayanan donated a gold ring he had purchased with his meagre savings as a daily-rated worker, and enlisted with the INA soon after. He was among the first batch of recruits from Selangor to be sent to Singapore for officer training. On being commissioned in 1945, he served as a quartermaster in a camp in Seremban, Negeri Sembilan, before being appointed the Station Staff Officer.

== Trade unionism ==
The post-war period (after 1945) was characterized by widespread unemployment, food shortages, long-hours of work and low rates of pay. Narayanan managed to find employment as an apprentice clerk in a rubber estate in Selangor. He later moved to become a clerk in another estate in Negeri Sembilan. His experiences in the estates provided him first-hand information on the appalling conditions suffered by estate workers (then referred to as labourers)." The fate of the Indian workers was even worse; brought in as indentured labourers to work in the rubber estates and public works, they were already marginalised prior to the war. They were being paid one cent an hour and worked for 12 hours a day, for 7 days a week. At the outbreak of the war, wages averaged at 60 cents for a 12-hour workday. After the war, employers were seeking to restore the status quo.

The young Narayanan felt moved to help the workers by forming a union with ten others. Barely 23 years of age, he was elected to serve as the Secretary of the Negeri Sembilan Plantation Workers Union. He rose and "dominated the Malayan trade union movement for several decades, [and] was a towering figure in the trade union movement in Malaya and internationally".

Six months after the formation of the union, he resigned as estate clerk and devoted his time fully to nurturing the union. He was allotted a salary of 125 Straits dollars but it never came regularly. The first bicycle he purchased was repossessed when he could not make the third instalment payment. And, when once the Union's phone bill could not be settled, Narayanan reluctantly pawned his wedding ring, hoping to redeem it someday. That day never came.

Narayanan faced strong competition from the communists who had spearheaded the anti-Japanese campaign (with British help) and had re-emerged as post-war heroes. They were pushing hard to form trade unions themselves, taking advantage of workers facing hardships due to the dislocations in the immediate post-war period. Being a staunch anti-communist, Narayanan steered his Union and, later, the nascent trade union movement in the country, away from communism to one based on democratic principles without affiliation to political parties or party politics. Individual members were free to support the political party of their choice, but the movement had to be seen as apolitical with the freedom to align with parties or politicians sympathetic to the cause of labour.

Narayanan was a delegate to the founding conference of the International Confederation of Free Trade Unions (ICFTU) in 1949. He was one of three persons who represented the movement even before the national body, Malayan Trade Union Congress (MTUC), was formed. It was at this meeting that the proposal to form an international umbrella body of free trade unions was passed. From this proposal was born the International Confederation of Free Trade Unions (ICFTU) in 1949. Aged 26, Narayanan was possibly the youngest participant and was unknown in the international gathering of the leading lights of trade unions from around the world. A documentary of the event identified Narayanan as "a young Asiatic friend". In a strange twist of destiny, this young Asiatic would eventually helm the world body some 25 years later.

At the end of World War II, Narayanan was a leading founder of the National Union of Plantation Workers. This union proved highly successful, becoming one of the strongest in the region, and in 1950 he was elected as president of the Malaysian Trade Union Congress, aged only 27.

In 1973, Narayanan was elected as chair of the ICFTU's Economic and Social Committee. He was also involved in its Asian Regional Organisation (ARO) from its early years, becoming president of ARO in 1960, serving a five-year term, then holding the post again from 1969 to 1976.

He was Vice President of the International Federation of Plantation, Agricultural and Allied Workers (IFPAAW) (1957-1987) and President between 1988-1992.

Then in 1975 he won election as president of the ICFTU. and held the post for four consecutive terms until his retirement in 1992, the first person to hold the role from outside Europe and North America. He served until his retirement in 1992.

== Rotary Club ==
Narayanan was elected as the President of the Rotary Club of Seremban in 1950. The Club had the distinction of being the first Rotary Club in Malaya, having been established in 1929. Narayanan was 27 at that time and reputedly the youngest Rotary President in the World.

== Legislator ==
Narayanan was sworn in as a member of the Federal Legislative Council in February 1948. The Hansards of the period show that he not only fought fiercely to protect the rights of the workers but did so with much humour and humanity.

He was one of four people who represented the Malayan Legislative Council at the coronation of Queen Elizabeth II in London in 1953.

== Towards independence and nation-building ==
In 1948, just before the Emergency, the Communist Party in Malaya issued a secret instruction that the party should take control of progressive mass institutions like trade unions, youth and women's organisations and place them under the direct leadership of the party. Efforts were to be intensified through Communist-controlled trade unions to create labour unrest. Then labour unions could be strengthened as they could be the communists' strongest weapon. Narayanan proved to be a major stumbling block to their aspirations.

In October 1951, Sir Henry Gurney, the serving British High Commissioner in Malaya was assassinated by guerrilla agents. His replacement, Sir Gerald Templer, only took up his post after a gap of about four months in February 1952, during which time the guerrilla activities had intensified. He was a decorated military officer and was amply qualified to handle the military aspects of the problem. Moreover, Gurney had already started implementing the Briggs Plan to cut supplies and support the guerrillas were receiving from the unassimilated Chinese population scattered along the fringes of jungles. The Plan involved the resettling of nearly half a million Chinese into "New Villages" that were ringed with barbed wire and patrolled regularly by police. Templer's immediate task was to continue implementing the Plan.

Templer also needed the support of the Indians, who were largely in estates which were being targeted by the guerrillas who wanted to destroy the economy of colonial Malaya. The communists were also intimidating the estate workforce in attempts to regain control of the labour movement that they had lost when many union leaders aligned to them went underground at the onset of the Emergency. But his personality did not allow for easy friendships. Templer was suspicious of the Tunku, who led the Malays and had an uneasy relationship with Tan Cheng Lock, the Chinese leader. A British civil servant in Malaya had noted that "[b]ehind his penetrating gaze there was a tough, even a harsh quality, an intimidating character, whose mordant tongue and vivid language would unquestionably make him some enemies in Malaya." A local historian was more direct in his assessment: "Templer was a feared man, who became notorious for his violent temper and intemperate language."

Narayanan, who had tremendous influence in the estates, was a nationalist but opposed to militant communism. Templar saw in him an important ally to fight the communist threat. He, therefore, enlisted "the cooperation of P.P. Narayanan, a Federal Legislative Council Member, a powerful trade union leader, and the first President of the Malayan Trades Union Congress and General Secretary of the National Union of Plantation Workers."

Narayanan had no difficulty working with Templer. The former had cut his teeth on driving hard bargains with arrogant and abrasive European planters and estate managers, long before he met Templer. Comber, in his book on Templer, wondered aloud if Templar's views of Narayanan might have been different had he known that Narayanan had fought against the British colonial forces in Malaya as part of the INA.

These speculations notwithstanding, surprisingly, Narayanan's views were taken seriously. On one occasion, he had suggested that Templar visit some of the worst areas affected by the insurgency like Bahau (in Negeri Sembilan) and Yong Peng (in Johor) to help build the morale of the people there. Several days later, Templer called him to say he had just returned from Bahau. He then added, "Well, you see, I do listen to people like you."

Just prior to Narayanan's departure for London as part of a four-man delegation that represented the Federal Legislature at the coronation of Queen Elizabeth II in London, Templer reminded Narayanan that the trip provides a rare opportunity to meet the heads of the Malayan rubber and tin industries in the UK, and volunteered to get the Colonial Office in London to arrange meetings with them. And Narayanan indeed did meet them.

Not until recently has the role of the anti-communist trade union movement in the fight for Malayan nationhood been acknowledged. Writing in 2015, Comber noted that the "Trade union movement was one of the strongest forces working for a Malayan nation."

== Awards and recognition ==
He received the Ramon Magsaysay Award for Public Service in 1962 and was the second recipient from Malaysia (the first being Malaysia's first Prime Minister, Tunku Abdul Rahman, himself). He set aside one-half of the prize money to establish a Workers' Education Fund and contributed a ringgit a day to the scholarship fund for the rest of his life, reflecting his belief that the children of plantation workers should move out of plantations to secure better-paying jobs offering a clear career path for advancement.

He was honoured posthumously when a major road in Petaling Jaya, in the state of Selangor, was named Jalan P. P. Narayanan (a.k.a. Persiaran P. P. Narayanan) Coincidentally, the road is a logical extension of Jalan Templer (named after Gerald Templer) where the headquarters of the NUPW had been situated during Narayanan's lifetime.

In his own country, Narayanan declined several awards given by the government fearing that it might compromise the neutrality of the trade union movement. He, however, received with gratitude the Honorary Doctor of Laws degree from Universiti Sains Malaysia, in 1974, viewing the award as a consolation for his interrupted academic pursuit (USM 2016, p. 144.

In 1951, he became the first recipient of Gold Medal of the Malayan Trade Union Congress for his services and leadership. In 1986, MTUC honoured Narayanan again by conferring the title, Bapa Pekerja Malaysia (Father of Malaysian Workers) and making him Honorary Life President in recognition of his lifetime of service to the trade union movement in the country.

In 1988, the Tata Workers' Union in India invited PP to deliver the 4th Michael John Memorial Lecture and receive the Gold Medal. Other distinguished personalities who received the award after him include APJ Abdul Kalam, the President of India (2002), R. Venkataraman, former President of India (1993), and S. K. Jain, Former Deputy. Director-General, of the ILO (1989).

On 16 March 1992, the President of Venezuela, conferred the Order of Francisco de Miranda, First Class, to Dr. P. P. Narayanan for his outstanding services and contributions. The award was received in absentia by a representative in Caracas.

== Spiritual side ==
Narayanan was influenced at an early age by the lives and works of great spiritual personalities like Ramakrishna Paramahansa, Swami Vivekananda, Sri Aurobindo, Swami Sivananda, Swami Ramadas, and Paramahansa Yogananda. He meditated regularly, twice a day.

His spiritual interest drew him to the South Indian spiritual leader, Kanchi Mahaperiyavar Jagadguru Shri Chandrasekharendra Saraswati. He also met others like Maharishi Mahesh Yogi, Pandri Malai Swamigal, Satya Sai Baba, and was granted audience by four Popes of the Catholic Church, including Pope Paul VI and Pope John Paul II^{[3]}. He also served on the boards of several religious organisations in Malaysia and became the Chairman of the Sri Aurobindo Society in Pondicherry, India in 1983. He occupied this position until his passing in 1996.

== Final days and death ==
Narayanan resigned as secretary general of the NUPW and gave up almost all his other numerous positions in 1992 on account of poor health and died four years later, on 19 February 1996, a week after he turned 73.

An award was instituted in his name by his family at Universiti Sains Malaysia.

== Further reading: papers, talks, books and other publications ==
- P.P. Narayanan A World Trade Unionist
- Wages -- Malaysia -- Rubber industry and trade.
- National Union of Plantation Workers : A Talk
- P.P. Narayanan - the Asian trade union leader. Forew. by Tunku Abdul Rahman Putra A1-haj
- Relationships at the place of work : their effective regulation and the impact on them of external relationships and national policies
- Trade unions role in development
- Role of trade unions in South East Asia
- A policy statement on our immediate tasks
- Wages -- Malaysia -- Rubber industry and trade.
- Social and economic contribution of rural unions to development

Trade union offices
Preceded by New position	President of the Malaysian Trades Union Congress; 1950–1952	Succeeded by C. H. Yin
Preceded by Mohd Yusoff	President of the Malaysian Trades Union Congress; 1955–1956	Succeeded by Tan Chong Bee
Preceded by Jose J. Hernandez	President of the ICFTU Asian Regional Organisation; 1960–1965	Succeeded by Haruo Wada
Preceded by Minoru Takita	President of the ICFTU Asian Regional Organisation; 1969–1976	Succeeded by Devan Nair
Preceded by Donald MacDonald	President of the International Confederation of Free Trade Unions; 1972–1992	Succeeded by Roy Trotman
Preceded by Yeoh Teck Chye	President of the Malaysian Trades Union Congress; 1973–1985	Succeeded by Zainal Rampak
Preceded by Börje Svensson	President of the International Federation of Plantation and Agricultural Workers; 1988–1992	Succeeded by Post vacant
