= Confederation of Free Trade Unions (Mongolia) =

National trade union center in Mongolia

The Confederation of Free Trade Unions (CMTU) is a national trade union center in Mongolia. It was the first alternative trade union centre in Mongolia, founded after the monopoly of the Confederation of Mongolian Trade Unions was broken in the late 1990s. The CFTU and other independent trade union have, however, not been able to challenge the dominance of CMTU in the Mongolian labour market.
