= Syed Shahir Syed Mohamud =

Malaysian senator and trade unionist

Senator Elected by the Penang State Legislative Assembly
- In office 1 June 2012 – 31 May 2015
- Monarch: Sultan Abdul Halim
- Prime Minister: Najib Razak

President of Malaysian Trades Union Congress
- In office 2005–2010
- Preceded by: Zainal Rampak
- Succeeded by: Mohd Khalid Atan

Personal details
- Born: January 1, 1952 Raub, Pahang, Malaysia
- Party: Parti Sosialist Rakyat Malaysia (PSRM) (1974-2003); Parti Keadilan Rakyat (PKR) (2003-)

Syed Shahir Syed Mohamud is a former trade unionist and Senator from Malaysia. He led the country’s top umbrella union body, the Malaysian Trades Union Congress, as president from 2005 to 2010. He also served a single term as Senator in the Dewan Negara from 2012 to 2015.

== Early life ==
Syed Shahir was born in Kampung Sega, Raub, Pahang, in 1952.

A young socialist, he became involved in the National Union of Transport Equipment & Allied Workers in his early 20s.

He was then selected by Parti Socialist Rakyat Malaysia (PSRM) to contest the Batu Talam state seat in the 1974 Pahang state elections. He lost to a candidate from the ruling Umno/BN coalition.

He became involved in trade union activities and labour movement in Malaysia, and represented the country in various forums, conferences and seminars at the national and international levels.

He remained with PSRM even as the party reverted to the Parti Rakyat Malaysia moniker in the late 1980s and then later initiated a merger with Parti Keadilan Nasional to form Parti Keadilan Rakyat by 2003.

== MTUC president ==
After competing five times for a position in MTUC, he succeeded in becoming MTUC President by defeating veteran unionist Zainal Rampak. He won a second term in 2007 and ultimately served from 2005 to 2010.

As MTUC president, he recognised that many traditional working-class jobs were going to migrant labourers and called for greater solidarity among the international workers' movements.

On 7 May 2008, Syed Shahir led hundreds of MTUC members in a demonstration at the Parliament building in Kuala Lumpur to send a memorandum to Human Resources Minister Dr S. Subramaniam. They demanded the implementation of a minimum wage of RM900 and a living allowance of RM300 per month.

Syed Shahir was also involved in founding of the Bersih electoral movement which called for free and fair elections. He was a leader of the original Bersih gathering in 2007.

His name was included in a list of 91 opposition leaders who were banned from entering the Kuala Lumpur area during the second Bersih protests in 2011.

== Electoral contests ==
In his first election in 1974 he represented PSRM and lost in the contest for the Batu Talam (state constituency) to Umno/BN’s Abdul Rahman Ismail.

In 2004 he returned to electoral politics and contested the Kelana Jaya (federal constituency) under the PKR banner. He was defeated by Loh Seng Kok of MCA/BN, by a margin of 21,571 votes.

In the 2008 Malaysian General Election, Syed Shahir again represented PKR and was defeated by Ong Tee Keat from MCA/BN in the Pandan (federal constituency). Ong won by a majority of 2,961 votes, garnering 25,236 votes while Syed Shahir got 22,275 votes.

On 9 May 2012, Syed Shahir was nominated by Penang Chief Minister Lim Guan Eng to the Dewan Negara. He served a single three-year term.

After his retirement he was appointed as Institut Pemberdayaan Pekerja Selangor chairperson.

== Election results ==
Pahang State Legislative Assembly
Year	Constituency	Candidate	Votes	Pct	Opponent(s)	Votes	Pct	Ballots cast	Majority	Turnout
1974	Batu Talam	Syed Shahir Syed Mohamud (PSRM)	1,158	26.49%	Abdul Rahman Ismail (UMNO)	3,213	73.51%	4,371	2,055	77.91%

Parliament of Malaysia
Year	Constituency	Candidate	Votes	Pct	Opponent(s)	Votes	Pct	Ballots cast	Majority	Turnout
2004	P104 Kelana Jaya	Syed Shahir Syed Mohamud (PKR)	14,275	28.48%	Loh Seng Kok (MCA)	35,846	71.52%	50,121	21,571	70.06%
2008	P100 Pandan	Syed Shahir Syed Mohamud (PKR)	22,275	46.88%	Ong Tee Keat (MCA)	25,236	53.12%	47,511	2,961	74.90%
