= Minoru Takita =

Japanese trade union leader (1912– 2000)

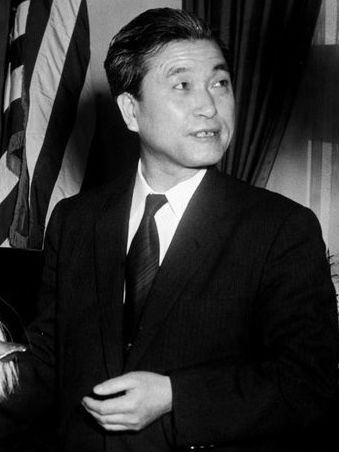

Minoru Takita (Japanese: 滝田 実, 15 December 1912 – 9 December 2000) was a Japanese trade union leader.

Born in the Toyama Prefecture, Takita qualified as an electrical engineer at Takaoka Technical College, then worked at Nisshin Bõseki. In 1948, he became the chair of the union at Nisshin Bōseki, and also of the Japan Federation of Textile Workers' Unions (Zensen), to which it was affiliated. In 1954, he additionally became president of the All-Japan Trade Union Congress (Zenrō), serving until 1964, when it merged into the Japanese Confederation of Labour (Dōmei).

Takita became a vice chair of the International Confederation of Free Trade Unions (ICFTU) in 1965, and in 1968 also became president of the ICFTU Asia and Pacific Regional Organisation. The same year, he became the president of the Dōmei. He resigned from the leadership of Zensen in 1971, becoming honorary president, and in 1972 he left the leadership of Dōmei.

In retirement, Takita worked as an advisor to his former unions, and in 1981, he was awarded the First Class Great Cordon of the Order of the Rising Sun. He died in 2000.

Trade union offices
Preceded by New position	President of Zensendomei; 1948–1971	Succeeded by Tadanobu Usami
Preceded by New position	President of the All-Japan Trade Union Congress; 1954–1964	Succeeded by Merged into Dōmei
Preceded by Yutaka Nabasama	President of the Japanese Confederation of Labour; 1968–1972	Succeeded by Seiji Amaike
Preceded by Haruo Wada	President of the ICFTU Asia and Pacific Regional Organisation; 1968–1969	Succeeded by P. P. Narayanan
