= K. Rajalingam =

Ceylonese politician (1909–1985)

Kalimuthu Rajalingam (3 December 1909 – 9 March 1985) was a Ceylonese politician, trade unionist and Tamil activist.

Rajalingam was elected to parliament at the 1st parliamentary election held between 23 August 1947 and 20 September 1947, representing the Ceylon Indian Congress, as the member for the Nawalapitiya electorate. He was one of seven Ceylon India Congress candidates who were elected to that first parliament.
