= Malaysian Trades Union Congress =

Coordinates: 3°2′46.2″N 101°35′18.8″E

MTUC
- Malaysian Trades Union Congress
- Founded: 1949
- Dissolved: 7 May 2026 (temporarily dissolved as ordered by the Registrar of Societies; dissolution suspended by the High Court)
- Headquarters: Wisma MTUC,10-5, Jalan USJ 9/5T, 47620 Subang Jaya, Selangor
- Location: Malaysia
- Members: 950,000
- Key people: Datuk Abdul Halim, President
- Affiliations: ITUC
- Website: www.mtuc.org.my

The Malaysian Trades Union Congress (MTUC; Malay: Kongres Kesatuan Sekerja Malaysia) is a national trade union centre in Malaysia. It was formed in 1949 and was originally known as the Malayan Trades Union Council. It then changed its name to the Malayan Trades Union Congress in 1958, and then to its current name with the formation of Malaysia.

It operates as a federation of hundreds of affiliated trade unions, officially registered under the Societies Act, 1955.

MTUC is affiliated with the International Trade Union Confederation.

== History ==
The inception of the MTUC occurred during a tumultuous period marked by the declaration of the First Emergency against insurgent communist activities.

A previous umbrella union body called the Pan Malayan Federation of Trade Unions had even been outlawed by the British colonial authorities and workers' leaders such as SA Ganapathy and P Veerasenan were executed for alleged terrorist activity in May 1949.

Soon after, labour leader PP Narayanan emerged as a founder of the National Union of Plantation Workers. This union proved highly successful, becoming one of the strongest in the region, and in 1950 he was elected as president of the MTUC, aged only 27. He went on to serve as MTUC president for a total of 15 years spread over three spells.

Other notable MTUC leaders have included V David and Zainal Rampak, both of whom were from the Transport Workers Union, Yeoh Teck Chye of the National Union of Bank Employees, Govindasamy Rajasekeran of the Malaysian Metal Industry Employees' Union and Syed Shahir Syed Mohamud of the National Union of Transport Equipment & Allied Industries Workers.

In addition to their MTUC posts, David was also a five-term MP, while Zainal Rampak and Syed Shahir served spells in Malaysia's upper house, the Dewan Negara.

In 1990, a number of unions attempted to break away from the MTUC and formed the Malaysian Labour Organization as a rival umbrella body. However after seven years, the MLO decided to dissolve and its member unions rejoined the MTUC.

Similarly in 2006, after Zainal was defeated by Syed Shahir in the contest for MTUC president, a group of five unions allied to Zainal and led by Abdul Razak Hassan of the Railwaymen's Union of Malaysia attempted a split from the MTUC. They met with then HR Minister Fong Chan Onn, but the split did not materialise.

=== Recent leadership disputes ===
In 2018, MTUC president Abdul Halim Mansor and secretary-general J Solomon traded barbs when supporting opposing coalitions in Malaysia's general election.

Solomon claimed that the Barisan National coalition was interfering in MTUC by getting Halim to endorse them, but at the same time, he urged members to vote for the rival Pakatan Harapan.

In September 2019, there was a tie in the election for MTUC president with Abdul Halim and Mohd Jafar Majid (National Union of Telekom Employees chief) ended up with the same number of votes. The leadership was paralysed until 2022 when Jafar sent a letter to the Registar of Societies to say he was pulling out of the race. leaving the president's post to Abdul Halim.

In August 2023, the Shah Alam High Court declared the 2022 MTUC triennial delegates' conference null and void for violation of several provisions in its constitution. After several months, the MTUC general council unanimously decided to retract its appeal over the matter, but MTUC secretary-general Kamarul Baharin Mansor admitted that the internal conflict has somewhat rendered the organisation powerless and weak.

Industrial relations expert R. Nagiah said in the past, about 20% of the nation's overall workforce were union members, but the number had plummeted to 6.2% by 2024.

On 4 February 2025 a group of MTUC officials announced that it had removed Mohd Effendy Abdul Ghani as its president.

It said he was no longer authorised to use, represent or attend any events or meetings organised by the union, and was also barred from contesting for any MTUC positions for the next two terms.

"Any statements issued by Effendy after this no longer represent MTUC," claimed Dauzkaply Nor Ghazali said in a statement in which he named himself acting president.

However Effendy claimed that the action to remove him was illegal.

On 7 May 2026, MTUC was ordered by the Registrar of Societies to be temporarily dissolved after it has failed to submit several requested documentations and financial records. Following the temporary dissolution, multiple unions under the Labour Law Reform Coalition are working to form a new trade federation called the Malaysian Federation of Trade Unions. On 7 August, the Shah Alam High Court suspended MTUC's temporary dissolution.

== Working Committee office bearers ==
=== 2022-2025 ===
- President:
  - Mohd Effendy Bin Abdul Ghani (UPCW)
- Deputy President:
  - Matkar Bin Siwang (FIEU)
- Secretary General:
  - Kamarul Baharin bin Mansor (NUMW)
- Deputy Secretary General:
  - Mohd Khairi bin Man (EIWU)
- Financial Secretary:
  - Wang Heng Suang (NUTP)
- Deputy Financial Secretary:
  - Ng Choo Seong (ABOM)
- Vice President (Private Sector):
  - Mohamad Dauzkaply Nor bin Ghazali (KEPAIM)
  - Shatiri bin Mansor (CANON OPTO)
  - Dzulkernain bin Hassan (KPPPTNB)
  - A. Balasubramaniam (UNEPASS)
  - Mohd Rais Hafizuddin bin Adnan (PERODUA)
  - Mohd Khairul bin Buyang @ Buang (KPPIT)
  - Michelle Cheow Yee Pin (Pentadbiran Insurans)
- Vice President (Public Sector):
  - Aminuddin bin Awang (NUTP)
  - Norhayati Abdul Rashid (MNU)
  - Asman bin Mohd Nawawi (AUEGCAS)
- Vice President (Statutory Body):
  - Alwi Shakir bin Abdullah (Kesatuan Pekerja-Pekerja Tourism Malaysia)
  - Basharuddin bin Harun (KKAPPUM)
  - Mazmir bin Mohd Amin (UMGSU)
- Vice President (Women’s Committee):
  - Nasrifah Binti Sukarni (NUPCIW)
- Vice President (Youth Chairman) :
  - Mohd Sazuan bin Abdul Hadi (Kesatuan Kakitangan PERKESO)

== Past leadership ==
Year	President	Secretary General	Financial Secretary
1950–51	P. P. Narayanan – NUPW	X. E. Nathan – SSPWU	M.P. Rajagopal – AMRWU
1951–52	P. P. Narayanan – NUPW	X. E. Nathan – SSPWU	M.P. Rajagopal – AMRWU
1952–53	C.H. Yin – NUBE	M. Arokiasamy – SGGSU	V.M.N. Menon – AMESU
1953–54	Mohd Yusoff – PMSU	M. Arokiasamy – SGGSU	Wong Pak Choy – GCSUS
1955–56	P.P. Narayanan – NUPW	K.V. Thaver – NUT	H.K. Choudhury – NUPW
1956–57	Tan Chong Bee	K.V. Thaver – NUT	K. Duraiappah – NUTE
1957–58	Mohd Yusoff – PMSU	K.V. Thaver – NUT	Bachee Saw – NUPW
1958–59	S.P.S. Nathan – NUPW	K.V. Thaver – NUT	Bachee Saw – NUPW
1959–60	Lum Kin Tuck – NUT	K.V. Thaver – NUT	S. Kaniappan – UPOW
1960–61	Ibrahim Musa – ANULAE	Bachee Saw – NUPW	S. Kaniappan – UPOW
1961–62	V.E. Jesudoss – MTSU	Bachee Saw – NUPW	S. Kaniappan – UPOW
1962–63	Yeoh Teck Chye – NUBE	Ibrahim Musa – ANULAE	Bachee Saw – NUPW
1963–64	Donald U’ren – RUM	S.J.H. Zaidi – WDCSA	C.A. Mathews – AMMISU
1964–65	V.E. Jesudoss – MTSU	S.J.H. Zaidi – WDCSA	C.A. Mathews – AMMISU
1965–66	Yeoh Teck Chye – NUBE	S.J.H. Zaidi – WDCSA	G. Perumal – NUPW
1966–67	Yeoh Teck Chye – NUBE	S.J.H. Zaidi – WDCSA	G. Perumal – NUPW
1967–68	Yeoh Teck Chye – NUBE	S.J.H. Zaidi – WDCSA	G. Perumal – NUPW
1968–69	Yeoh Teck Chye – NUBE	S.J.H. Zaidi – WDCSA	G. Perumal – NUPW
1969–70	Yeoh Teck Chye – NUBE	S.J.H. Zaidi – WDCSA	G. Perumal – NUPW
1970–71	Yeoh Teck Chye – NUBE	S.J.H. Zaidi – WDCSA	G. Perumal – NUPW
1971–72	Yeoh Teck Chye – NUBE	S.J.H. Zaidi – WDCSA	G. Perumal – NUPW
1973–74	P.P. Narayanan – NUPW	S.J.H. Zaidi – CSEU	G. Perumal – NUPW
1975–76	P.P. Narayanan – NUPW	S.J.H. Zaidi – CSEU	G. Perumal – NUPW
1977–78	P.P. Narayanan – NUPW	Yahaya Mohd Ali – RUM	V. Baradan – RUM
1979–80	P.P. Narayanan – NUPW	V. David – TWU	V. Ramiah
1981–82	P.P. Narayanan – NUPW	V. David – TWU	V. Baradan – (until 1 Sept 81)
1981–82	P.P. Narayanan – NUPW	V. David – TWU	Mok Kim Jin
1983–84	P.P. Narayanan – NUPW	V. David – TWU	Mok Kim Jin
1985–86	P.P. Narayanan – (until 31 Dec 85)	V. David – TWU	V. Palani – UMGSU
1985–86	Zainal Rampak	V. David – TWU	V. Palani – UMGSU
1987–88	Zainal Rampak – TWU	V. David – TWU	S. Rajasegaram – AMESU
1989–90	Zainal Rampak – TWU	V. David – TWU	G. Rajendram – SOAUH
1991–92	Zainal Rampak – TWU	V. David – TWU	G. Rajendram – SOAUH
1993–Aug 93	Zainal Rampak – TWU	Govindasamy Rajasekaran – MIEU	Mohd Isa Jani – MASESU
Dec 93–94	Zainal Rampak – TWU	Govindasamy Rajasekaran – MIEU	Mohd Isa Jani – MASESU
1995–96	Zainal Rampak – TWU	Govindasamy Rajasekaran – MIEU	N. Sivasubramaniam – NUTP (until Sept 97)
1997–98	Zainal Rampak – TWU	Govindasamy Rajasekaran – MIEU	N. Sivasubramaniam – NUTP (until Sept 97)
1997–98	Zainal Rampak – TWU	Govindasamy Rajasekaran – MIEU	A. Sivananthan – Selangor Textile
1998–2000	Zainal Rampak – TWU	Govindasamy Rajasekaran – MIEU	A. Sivananthan – Selangor Textile
2000–04	Zainal Rampak – TWU	Govindasamy Rajasekaran – MIEU	A. Sivananthan – Selangor Textile
2005–07	Syed Shahir Syed Mohamud – NUTEAIW	Govindasamy Rajasekaran – MIEU	A. Sivananthan – Selangor Textile
2007–10	Syed Shahir Syed Mohamud – NUTEAIW	Govindasamy Rajasekaran – MIEU	Samuel Devadasan
2011–13	Mohd Khalid Atan	Abdul Halim Mansor	Awang Alias
2014-16	Khalid bin Atan	N. Gopal Kishnam	Awang Ibrahim
2016-20	Abdul Halim bin Mansor	J. Solomon	Ng Peng Ho
2020-22	Mohd Effendy bin Abdul Ghani (Acting)	Kamarul Bahrin bin Mansor	-
2022-25	Mohd Effendy bin Abdul Ghani	Kamarul Bahrin bin Mansor	Wang Heng Suan

== Affiliates ==
=== Agriculture ===
1. All Malayan Estates Staff Union (AMESU)
2. Kesatuan Kakitangan Jabatan Pertanian Sarawak
3. Kesatuan Pekerja-pekerja FELDA
4. Kesatuan Pekerja-pekerja Lembaga Kemajuan Ikan Malaysia
5. Sabah Plantation Industry Employees Union
6. Sabah Rubber Fund Board Employees Union
7. Association of Agricultural Executives Sabah
8. Kesatuan Pekerja-pekerja Felda Plantations Sdn. Bhd.
9. Kesatuan Pekerja-pekerja Jabatan Hutan Sarawak
10. Kesatuan Pekerja-pekerja Felda Rubber Products Sdn. Bhd.
11. Kesatuan Eksekutif Felcra Bhd.
12. Kesatuan Pekerja-pekerja Sabah Forest Industry
13. Association Shell Oilfields Supervisory and Specialist Staff Union

=== Mining and Petroleum ===
1. Kesatuan Kakitangan Petroleum Nasional Bhd (Petronas) Sarawak
2. Kesatuan Kebangsaan Pekerja-pekerja Lombong Semenanjung Malaysia
3. Kesatuan Pekerja-pekerja Esso Production Malaysia Inc.
4. Kesatuan Pekerja-pekerja Kumpulan Shell Semenanjung Malaysia
5. Sabah Mining Employees Union
6. Sabah Petroleum Industry Workers Union
7. Sarawak Petroleum Industry Workers Union
8. Sarawak Shell Employees Union
9. Sarawak Shell Oilfields Supervisory and Specialist Staff Union

=== Electricity and Water ===
1. Kesatuan Kakitangan Lembaga Air Melaka
2. Kesatuan Kakitangan Pihak Berkuasa Air Pulau Pinang
3. Kesatuan Kakitangan Puncak Niaga (M) Sdn. Bhd.
4. Kesatuan Sekerja Lembaga Air Sibu
5. Sabah Water Industry Employees Union
6. Sarawak Electricity Supply Corporation Employees Union
7. TNB Junior Officers Union
8. Kesatuan Pekerja-pekerja Indah Water Konsortium Sdn. Bhd.
9. Kesatuan Eksekutif Syarikat Puncak Niaga (M) Sdn. Bhd.
10. Kesatuan Jurutera-jurutera Sabah Electricity Sdn. Bhd.
11. Kesatuan Pekerja-pekerja SAJ Holdings Sdn. Bhd.
12. Kesatuan Percantuman Pekerja-pekerja Tenaga Nasional Bhd.
13. Persatuan Eksekutif Tenaga Nasional Bhd.

=== Commerce, Banking and Finance ===
1. Association of Bank Officers Malaysia
2. Association of Hong Kong Bank Officers
3. Association of Maybank Class One Officers
4. Association of Maybank Executives
5. Kesatuan Kakitangan Angkatan Koperasi Kebangsaan Malaysia Bhd. (KESUKA)
6. Kesatuan Kakitangan Eksekutif Bank of Commerce (M) Bhd.
7. Kesatuan Pegawai-pegawai Bank Muamalat (M) Bhd.
8. Kesatuan Sekerja Kakitangan Bank Kerjasama Rakyat Malaysia Berhad
9. National Union of Bank Employees
10. National Union of Commercial Workers
11. Sabah Banking Employees Union
12. Sabah Commercial Employees Union
13. Sarawak Bank Employees Union
14. Kesatuan Pegawai-pegawai Bank Sabah
15. Kesatuan Kakitangan Bank Simpanan Nasional
16. Persatuan Pegawai-pegawai Pentadbiran Industri Insurans

=== Construction ===
1. Union Of Employees in the Construction Industry

=== Manufacturing ===
1. Cement Industry Employees Union
2. Chemical Workers Union of Malaya
3. DMIB Employees Union
4. DMIB Management Staff Association
5. Drink Manufacturing Industry Employees Union, Sarawak
6. Electrical Industry Workers Unions
7. F&NCC Beverages Sdn. Bhd. Executive Staff Union
8. Johore Textile and Garment Workers
9. Kesatuan Kakitangan Espek Sdn. Bhd.
10. Kesatuan Kakitangan Perak – Hanjoong Simen Sdn. Bhd.
11. Kesatuan Kakitangan Percetakan Keselamatan Nasional Berhad
12. Kesatuan Pekerja MTC
13. Kesatuan Pekerja-pekerja Perodua
14. Kesatuan Pekerja-pekerja SME Technologies Sdn. Bhd.
15. Kesatuan Pekerja-pekerja Acrylic Textiles of Malaysia Sdn. Bhd.
16. Kesatuan Pekerja-pekerja Amalgamated Parts Manufacturers Sdn. Bhd.
17. Kesatuan Pekerja-pekerja APM Shock Absorbers
18. Kesatuan Pekerja-pekerja Auto Parts Manufacturing (Seats & Radiators)
19. Kesatuan Pekerja-pekerja Central Sugar Refinery
20. Kesatuan Pekerja-pekerja Fujikura Federal Cable
21. Kesatuan Pekerja-pekerja Gula Padang Terap Bhd.
22. Kesatuan Pekerja-pekerja Harris Advanced Technology (M) Sdn. Bhd.
23. Kesatuan Pekerja-pekerja Kian Joo
24. Kesatuan Pekerja-pekerja Kilang Gula Felda Perlis Sdn. Bhd.
25. Kesatuan Pekerja-pekerja Lucas Automotive Sdn. Bhd., Senai
26. Kesatuan Pekerja-pekerja Malay-Sino Chemical
27. Kesatuan Pekerja-pekerja Nippon Electric Glass (M) Sdn. Bhd.
28. Kesatuan Pekerja-pekerja Perusahaan Kumpulan United Motor Works
29. Kesatuan Pekerja-pekerja Perusahaan Membuat Tekstil dan Pakaian Perak
30. Kesatuan Pekerja-pekerja Pewter Kraftangan
31. Kesatuan Pekerja-pekerja Syarikat Gummi Metall Teknik (M) Sdn. Bhd.
32. Kesatuan Pekerja-pekerja Sime Tyres International Malaysia Sdn. Bhd.
33. Kesatuan Pekerja-pekerja Tamura Electronics (M) Sdn. Bhd.
34. Kesatuan Pekerja-pekerja Perusahaan Membuat Tekstil dan Pakaian Pulau Pinang dan Seberang Perai
35. Machinery Manufacturing Employees' Union
36. Malayan Sugar Manufacturing Employees' Union
37. Metal Industries Employees' Union
38. Motor Assemblers Supervisory Staff Union Peninsular Malaysia
39. National Union of Drinks Manufacturing Industry Workers
40. National Union of Employees in Companies Manufacturing Rubber Products
41. National Union of Industrial Mineral Smelting Workers
42. National Union of Petroleum and Chemical Industry Workers
43. National Union of Tobacco Workers
44. National Union of Transport Equipment Allied Industry Workers
45. National Union of Workers in the Shoe Manufacturing Industry
46. Non-Metallic Mineral Products Manufacturing Employees' Union
47. Negeri Sembilan and Malacca Textile and Garment Workers Union
48. Paper and Paper Products Manufacturing Employees' Union
49. Printing Industry Employees' Union
50. British American Tobacco Employees' Union, Malaysia
51. Selangor and Federal Territory Textile Workers Union
52. Union of Beverage Industry Workers
53. Union of Malayawata Steel Workers
54. Kesatuan Pekerja-pekerja Nippon Elec (M) Sdn. Bhd.
55. Kesatuan Pekerja-pekerja Time Reach Sdn. Bhd.
56. Kesatuan Pekerja-pekerja Epson Precision (M) Sdn. Bhd.
57. Kesatuan Kakitangan C.G.E. Utilities (M) Sdn. Bhd.
58. Kesatuan Pekerja-pekerja Kami Electronics Industry (M) Sdn. Bhd.
59. Kesatuan Pekerja-pekerja Perodua Engine Manufacturing Sdn. Bhd.
60. Kesatuan Pekerja-pekerja Hokuden (M) Sdn. Bhd
61. Kesatuan Pekerja-pekerja Casio (M) Sdn. Bhd.
62. Kesatuan Kakitangan Petroleum Nasional Bhd (Petronas Sabah)
63. Kesatuan Pekerja Shell MDS (M) Sdn. Bhd. Sarawak
64. Kesatuan Kakitangan Percetakan Nasional Malaysia Bhd. Sarawak
65. Kesatuan Pekerja-pekerja Sabah International Dairies Sdn. Bhd.
66. Kesatuan Pekerja-pekerja Hitachi Consumer Products (M) Sdn. Bhd.
67. Kesatuan Kakitangan Eksekutif Industri Makanan SM
68. Beverage Industry Executive Staff Union
69. Kesatuan Pekerja-pekerja Sabah International Dairies Sdn. Bhd.
70. Kesatuan Pekerja-pekerja Exxonmobil Exploration and Production Malaysia Inc.
71. Kesatuan Pekerja-pekerja Flextronics Manufacturing (M) Sdn. Bhd.
72. Kesatuan Pekerja-pekerja Perkayuan Semenanjung Malaysia
73. Kesatuan Pekerja-pekerja Qimonda Malaysia Sdn. Bhd.

=== Transport and Communications ===
1. Brooke Dockyard & Engineering Works Corporation Employees Union, Sarawak
2. Kesatuan Kakitangan Klang Container Terminal Sdn. Bhd.
3. Kesatuan Pekerja-pekerja Airod Sdn. Bhd.
4. Kesatuan Pekerja-pekerja Johor Port Bhd.
5. Kesatuan Pekerja-pekerja Limbongan Kapal
6. Kesatuan Pekerja-pekerja Limbongan Timor
7. Kesatuan Pekerja-pekerja M’sia Airports Bhd.
8. Kesatuan Pekerja-pekerja Malaysia Airport Bhd. Sarawak
9. Kesatuan Pekerja-pekerja MHS Aviation Sdn. Bhd. (Lapangan Terbang Kerteh – Kemaman)
10. Kesatuan Pekerja-pekerja Naval Dockyard Sdn. Bhd.
11. Kesatuan Pekerja-pekerja Pakaian Seragam Pos
12. Kesatuan Pekerja-pekerja Pelabuhan Klang Port Management Sdn. Bhd.
13. Kesatuan Pekerja-pekerja Pengkalan Bekalan Kemaman Sdn. Bhd.
14. Kesatuan Pekerja-pekerja Perbadanan Perkapalan Antarabangsa Malaysia Berhad (MISC) Semenanjung Malaysia
15. Kesatuan Pekerja-pekerja Perkeranian Pos Malaysia Berhad
16. Kesatuan Pekerja-pekerja Projek Lebuhraya Utara Selatan (PLUS)
17. Kesatuan Penyelia-penyelia Projek Lebuhraya Utara Selatan Bhd.
18. Kesatuan Sekerja Kakitangan Sistem Televisyen (M) Bhd.
19. Klang Port Management Staff Union
20. Malaysian Airlines System Employees’ Union Peninsular Malaysia
21. MAS Executive Staff Association
22. National Union of Newspaper Workers
23. National Union of Telekoms Employees
24. Penang Port Workers Union
25. Persatuan Pegawai-Pegawai Kanan Lembaga Pelabuhan Klang
26. Pos Malaysia Berhad Clerical Staff Union, Sabah
27. Railwaymen’s Union of Malaya
28. Rajang Port Authority Employees Union
29. Redifussion Workers Union Of Malaya
30. Sabah Port Authority Workers Union
31. Transport Workers Union
32. Union of Employees in Port Ancillary Services Suppliers
33. Kesatuan Pekerja-pekerja Telekom Malaysia Bhd. Sabah
34. MHS Aviation Sdn. Bhd. Employees’ Union Sarawak
35. Kesatuan Pegawai-pegawai Kanan Penang Port Sdn. Bhd.
36. Persatuan Pegawai Keselamatan Bukan Eksekutif Kuantan Port Consortium Sdn. Bhd.
37. Kesatuan Pekerja-pekerja Telekom Malaysia Bhd. Sabah
38. Kesatuan Pekerja Telekom Malaysia Berhad Sarawak
39. Persatuan Eksekutif Pos Malaysia
40. Kesatuan Pekerja–pekerja Lembaga Pelabuhan Kuching
41. Persatuan Kakitangan Eksekutif Sistem Penerbangan Malaysia (KK)
42. Kesatuan Eksekutif Utusan Melayu (M) Bhd.
43. Airlines Workers Union, Sarawak
44. Kesatuan Pekerja-pekerja Malaysia Airports Bhd. Wilayah Sabah
45. Kesatuan Eksekutif Airod Sdn. Bhd.
46. Kesatuan Sekerja Kakitangan Bintulu Port Sdn. Bhd.
47. Kesatuan Kakitangan Eksekutif MISC Bhd.
48. Kuching Port Authority Employees’ Union
49. Sabah Executive Staff Association of Malaysia Airlines
50. Kesatuan Pelaut Sabah

=== Services ===
1. Club Employees Union, Peninsular Malaysia
2. Commonwealth Services Employees Union
3. Concorde Hotel Employees Union
4. Kesatuan Kakitangan Am Kolej Tunku Abdul Rahman
5. Kesatuan Pekerja-pekerja Pens Travelodge Kangar
6. Kesatuan Pekerja-pekerja Hotel Sarawak
7. Kesatuan Pekerja-pekerja Parkroyal Kuala Lumpur
8. Kesatuan Pekerja-pekerja Safeguards Corporation Berhad
9. Kesatuan Pekerja-pekerja Securicor (M)
10. Kesatuan Pekerja-pekerja Securicor (M) Sdn. Bhd. Sabah
11. Kesatuan Pekerja-pekerja Securicor Sarawak
12. Kesatuan Pengawal-pengawal Keselamatan Malayan Banking
13. National Union of Hotel, Bar & Restaurant Workers, Peninsular Malaysia
14. National Union of Race Horse Syces Pen
15. National Union of Teachers in Independent Schools
16. Penang Turf Club Race Day Workers Union
17. Resort World Bhd. Executive Union
18. Resort World Employees Union
19. Sarawak Medical Services Union
20. Union of Employees in Private Medical Health Services
21. Union of Employees in Trade Unions
22. Sarawak Club Employee’s Union
23. Kesatuan Pekerja-pekerja B. Braun Medical Industries Sdn. Bhd.
24. Kesatuan Kebangsaan Kakitangan Akademik Institusi Pengajian Tinggi
25. Kesatuan Pekerja-pekerja Zetavest Sdn. Bhd.
26. Kesatuan Eksekutif Angkatan Koperasi Kebangsaan Malaysia Bhd.
27. Sabah Hotel, Resort & Restaurant Employees Union
28. Kesatuan Pekerja-pekerja Alam Flora Sdn. Bhd.
29. Kesatuan Pekerja-pekerja LSG Sky Chefts-Brahim’s Sdn. Bhd.

=== Government Services ===
1. Amalgamated Union of Employees in Government Clerical and Allied Services
2. Employees Provident Fund Board Staff Union
3. Kuala Lumpur City Council Workers Union
4. Kesatuan Kakitangan Am Universiti Putra Malaysia
5. Kesatuan Kakitangan Kumpulan Wang Simpanan Pekerja Sarawak
6. Kesatuan Kakitangan Lembaga Pasaran dan Pelesen Getah Malaysia, Semenanjung Malaysia
7. Kesatuan Kakitangan Lembaga Urusan dan Tabung Haji
8. Kesatuan Kakitangan Lembaga Pembangunan Pelaburan Malaysia (MIDA)
9. Kesatuan Kebangsaan Pembantu Tadbir Kesihatan Semenanjung Malaysia
10. Kesatuan Pegawai-pegawai Hasil Dalam Negeri
11. Kesatuan Pegawai-pegawai Majlis Amanah Rakyat (MARA)
12. Kesatuan Pekerja pekerja Jabatan Cetak Kerajaan
13. Kesatuan Pekerja-pekerja Jabatan Kebajikan Masyarakat Malaysia Semenanjung Malaysia (KIKMAS)
14. Kesatuan Pekerja-pekerja Koperasi Polis Diraja Malaysia Bhd.
15. Kesatuan Pekerja-pekerja Perbadanan Kemajuan Pelancongan Malaysia
16. Kesatuan Pekerja-pekerja Perbadanan Pembangunan Bandar Malaysia (UDA)
17. Kesatuan Pekerja-pekerja Zoo Negara/Akuarium Tunku Abdul Rahman
18. Kesatuan Sekerja Anggota Kumpulan Wang Simpanan Sabah
19. Kesatuan Sekerja Kakitangan Kemajuan Pahang Tenggara (DARA)
20. Kesatuan Sekerja Kakitangan Majlis Perbandaran Tawau
21. Malayan Nurses Union
22. Malayan Technical Services Union
23. Malaysian Rubber Board Staff Union
24. National Union of Public Works Department Employees
25. National Union of the Teaching Profession
26. Penang Municipal Services Union
27. Sabah Electricity Board Employees Union
28. Sabah Medical Services Union
29. Senior Officers Association University Hospital
30. University Hospital Staff Union
31. University of Malaya General Staff Union
32. Kesatuan Kakitangan Perbadanan Hal Ehwal Bekas Angkatan Tentera
33. Sabah Inland Revenue Employee’s Union
34. Kesatuan Kakitangan PERKESO

== See also ==
- Trade unions in Malaysia
- P.P. Narayanan
- V. David
- Govindasamy Rajasekaran
- Syed Shahir Syed Mohamud
