= Trade unions in Malaysia =

- National organization(s): MTUC
- Regulatory authority: Ministry of Human Resources
- Primary legislation: Trade Unions Act of 1959; Industrial Relations Act of 1967

Global Rights Index
- 5 No guarantee of rights

International Labour Organization
- Malaysia is a member of the ILO

Trade unions in Malaysia are regulated by the Trade Unions Act of 1959 and the Industrial Relations Act of 1967. Malaysia scored 5 on the Global Rights Index (GRI) by the International Trade Union Confederation (ITUC), which signifies "no guarantee of rights".

== Membership ==
While the Malaysian constitution guarantees the rights of all Malaysians to form and join a trade union, there are several restrictions imposed by the laws relating to trade unions, i.e., the Trade Unions Act of 1959 and the Industrial Relations Act of 1967.

The restrictive Trade Unions Act does not allow general unions for workers. Membership of any trade union is confined to only those who are employees of a particular industry, establishment, trade and occupation. For example, a bank employee could only be a member of a banking union, but cannot be a member of an airline union or teachers union while a hotel employee, a timber worker or a labourer could not be members of the same union.

For enterprise or in-house union, membership is confined to employees of that particular establishment or company - employees of the company’s subsidiary or an associate company could not join that union. Temporary workers, contract workers including foreign workers could join union as members. However, most of the workers were reluctant to join a union for fear that their contract might not be renewed or work permit cancelled, making it difficult for a union to represent them.

Generally managerial, executive, confidential and security employees cannot be members of a non-executive union, nor can they be represented by a union for the purpose of collective bargaining.

The Trades Unions Act protects workers from being victimised by an employer for joining a union. However, the same section of an act states explicitly that an employer may dismiss, demote, transfer or refuse to promote a worker on other grounds. However, it has not stopped employers form dismissing trade union officials for writing Union circulars (Industrial Court Award Trienekens Sarawak Sdn Bhd)

The Industrial Relations Act allows employers to prohibit management, executives and those who work in a confidential or security capacity from joining a union. The definitions of these terms are left to the employers' discretion. In practice, some employers classify all clerical staff as working in a confidential capacity and production workers as working in a security capacity since they oversee their machines.

Should the Director General of Industrial Relations fail to get both parties to reach an agreement, the matter is referred to the Human Resources Minister. The minister will investigate and make a decision which may not be overturned by a Malaysian court.

The government policy of segregating trade unions and promoting enterprise unions over national and industry unions has, stifled the trade unions movement. Only 3% of private sector workers are trade union members, and less than 2% are covered by collective agreements. While the number of trade unions has increased most of the unions are in-house unions with less than 100 members.

== Agreements ==
Collective Agreements are governed under the Industrial Relations Act 1967.

Trade union effectiveness in securing decent collective agreements and to protect workers are restricted because Unions must obtain recognition from the employer after it can prove by secret ballot that the majority of the eligible employees are its members.

After that, the employer has 21 days in which to recognise the union. If the employer does not provide recognition within the stipulated period the matter will be taken to the Director General of Industrial Relations for arbitration. This is a very cumbersome process and disputes normally take years to resolve.

Even if the union finally obtains the necessary recognition to represent the workers, the ability to negotiate for better benefits is further restricted as it is virtually impossible for a union to strike.

A deadlock here is referred to the Director General of Industrial Relations for conciliation. Failure to obtain compromise results in the case being referred to the minister who shall refer it to the Industrial Court for arbitration at his discretion. All industrial actions, including picketing and strikes must stopped once the minister makes the reference.

Unions may submit collective agreements on behalf of their members but the Industrial Relations Act (Part IV) forbids such agreements to deal with any matter pertaining to promotion, transfers, termination of service, dismissal and retrenchments.

Decisions of the Industrial Court may be challenged further in the high court, the appeals court and the federal court.

The law allows for duration of collective agreements to be at least three years.

== Strikes ==
The Industrial Relations Act defines a "strike" in a sufficiently broad manner to include work-to-rule and go-slow actions. "Any act or omission by a body of workers, which is intended or which does result in any limitation, restriction, reduction, delatoriness in the performance of their duties connected to their employment"

Illegal strikes have consequences such as fines or imprisonment.

A legal strike requires that the union have a trade dispute. A secret ballot with not less than two thirds of the workers involved is required. The Director General has to be informed next. After that, the employer must be informed of the date of the strike. This is all required to prepare for a strike.

If the Minister should refer the case to the Industrial Court before the strike occurs then the strike must not be carried out.

If it is a public sector union then the Minister refers the disputed matter to the Industrial Court only with the consent of the Agong (King) or the state ruler, if it is a state body in question.

The last major strike in Malaysia occurred in 1962. 9,000 railway workers went on strike to demand conversion of daily wages be changed to monthly salaries. The strike lasted 22 days and all government workers were converted to monthly wages. The railway belonged to and was operated by the government at the time, but has since been corporatised.
