= P. Veerasenan =

P. Veerasenan was a notable labour unionist from Singapore. He was once the President of the Standing Committee of Singapore General Labour Union (SGLU) as well as the vice-president of the Singapore Federation of Trade Unions (SFTU). In his career, he befriended S.A. Ganapathy, the former president of the Pan Malayan Federation of Trade Unions (PMFTU), and Abdullah CD, chairman of the Communist Party of Malaya (CPM).

Both Ganapathy and Veeraseenan were executed by the British in 1949.

== Political activism ==
He succeeded Ganapathy as the president of the PMFTU. On 18 August 1946, under his leadership, the Singapore Federation of Trade Unions (SFTU) organised a mass protest of 5000 people in Singapore.

He strongly criticised the Malayan government's immigration policy and condemned negotiation by the government to bring in more Indian labourers into Malaya. He also advocated for the prohibition of alcohol products among the Indian labourers due to concerns about its negative effects.

He also condemned the Advisory Council for not representing the Indian community at all in Malaya. SFTU also made an appeal to the Indian government, Indian National Congress, Communist Party of India and the All-India Muslim League to double check on the proposed influx of Indians to Malaya.

== Death ==
On 19 March 1949, S.A. Ganapathy was arrested at Waterfall Estate in Rawang. On 3 May 1949, a day before the prosecution of his friend, Veeraseenan was shot dead by the British in his camp at Bertang estate, Jelebu, Negeri Sembilan by the Gurkha Rifles. His base camp was described by the military spokesman as being the First Brigade Headquarters of the Malayan National Liberation Army.
