= Thai Trade Union Congress =

Thai trade union federation

TTUC
- Thai Trade Union Congress
- Founded: 1982
- Headquarters: Samut Prakan, Thailand
- Location: Thailand
- Affiliations: ITUC

The Thai Trade Union Congress (TTUC, Thai: สภาองค์การลูกจ้างแรงงานแห่งประเทศไทย) is a trade union federation in Thailand. It was founded in 1982 and is affiliated with the International Trade Union Confederation.
