= Chandra Karunaratne =

Sri Lankan politician

Hon. Chandra Karunaratne

Member of Parliament for Badulla
- In office 1989–1994

Personal details
- Party: United National Party

Chandra Amarakone Karunaratne is a Sri Lankan politician and a former member of the Parliament of Sri Lanka.

In 1989 she was elected to the seat of Badulla, representing the United National Party. She served as the Minister of State of Women's Affairs
