= Confederation of Free Trade Unions of India =

Indian trade union confederation

- Confederation of Free Trade Unions of India
- Founded: 3 May 1947 (79 years ago)
- Headquarters: Parmanand Niketanam, Annie Besant Road, Patna-800004, Bihar, India
- Location: India
- Members: 1.6 million
- Key people: N. Kanaka Rao (President) Neeraj Chaubey (General Secretary)
- Affiliations: ITUC
- Website: http://www.cftui.org/

The Confederation of Free Trade Unions of India is a trade union confederation in India. N. Kanaka Rao is the general secretary of CFTUI. CFTUI became a full member of the World Confederation of Labour in 1999. In 2003 the then CFTUI president Ashok Kumar Trivedi was assassinated.

In 2006 CFTUI became an associate organization of the International Trade Union Confederation.

== Administration ==
Confederation of Free Trade Unions of India (CFTUI) national executive committee member Balabhanu had expressed reservations on the sale and privatisation of public sector company Visakhapatnam Steel Plant and other public sector organisations highlighting its negative impact on the job opportunities of people working in the organised and unorganised sectors.

Confederation of Free Trade Unions of India had suggested Union Government to ratify ILO convention (C-189) for improving workers condition in country.

== See also ==
- Indian National Trade Union Congress
- Trade unions in India
