= Kiribati Trade Union Congress =

KTUC
- Kiribati Trade Union Congress
- Founded: 1982
- Headquarters: Tarawa, Kiribati
- Location: Kiribati
- Members: 2500, 7 unions
- Key people: Tatoa Kaiteie
- Affiliations: ITUC

The Kiribati Trade Union Congress (KTUC) is the national trade union center of Kiribati. It was formed in 1982. All 7 registered unions in Kiribati are affiliated with the KTUC.

KTUC is affiliated with the International Trade Union Confederation.
