= Vanuatu Council of Trade Unions =

VCTU
- Vanuatu Council of Trade Unions
- Founded: 1985
- Headquarters: Port Vila, Vanuatu
- Location: Vanuatu
- Key people: Obed Masingiow, president
- Affiliations: ITUC

The Vanuatu Council of Trade Unions (VCTU), in French Conseil des syndicats de Vanuatu, is the sole national trade union center in Vanuatu. It was founded in 1985 and all five unions in Vanuatu are affiliated to it. Membership has declined since 1994, when bitter strikes and conflict with the Maxime Carlot Korman government resulted in wholesale dismissals and new anti-strike legislation.

The VCTU is affiliated to the International Trade Union Confederation.
