= Papua New Guinea Trade Union Congress =

PNGTUC
- Papua New Guinea Trade Union Congress
- Founded: 1969
- Location: Papua New Guinea
- Members: 70,200
- Key people: John Paska, general secretary
- Affiliations: ITUC

The Papua New Guinea Trade Union Congress (PNGTUC) is a national trade union center in Papua New Guinea. It was formed in 1970 and has a membership of 70,200.

The PNGTUC grew from 11 affiliates and 17,000 members in 1986 to 30 unions and 60,000 members by 1988.

The PNGTUC is affiliated with the International Trade Union Confederation.
