= Bangladesh Free Trade Union Congress =

National trade union federation

BFTUC
- Founded: 1983
- Headquarters: 6/A, 1/19 Mirpur; Dhaka
- Location: Bangladesh
- Members: 158,693 (2003)
- Key people: M.S. Alom Mendu Mia, President; Mamunur Rashid Chowdhury, General Secretary
- Affiliations: ITUC

The Bangladesh Free Trade Union Congress (BFTUC) is a national federation of trade unions in Bangladesh. It was established in 1983. It is affiliated with the International Trade Union Confederation.
