= Confederation of Mongolian Trade Unions =

National trade union center in Mongolia

Confederation of Mongolian Trade Union
- Монголын Үйлдвэрчний Эвлэлийн Холбоо
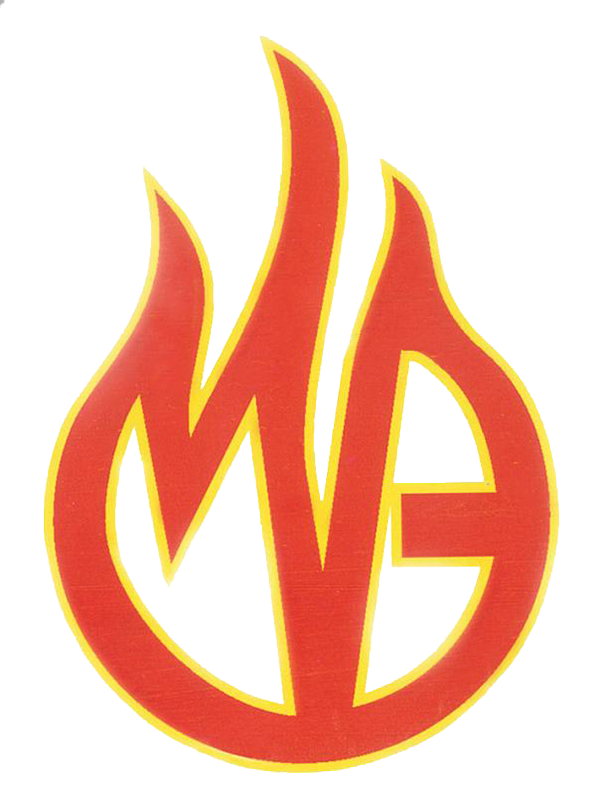
- Logo of the CMTU

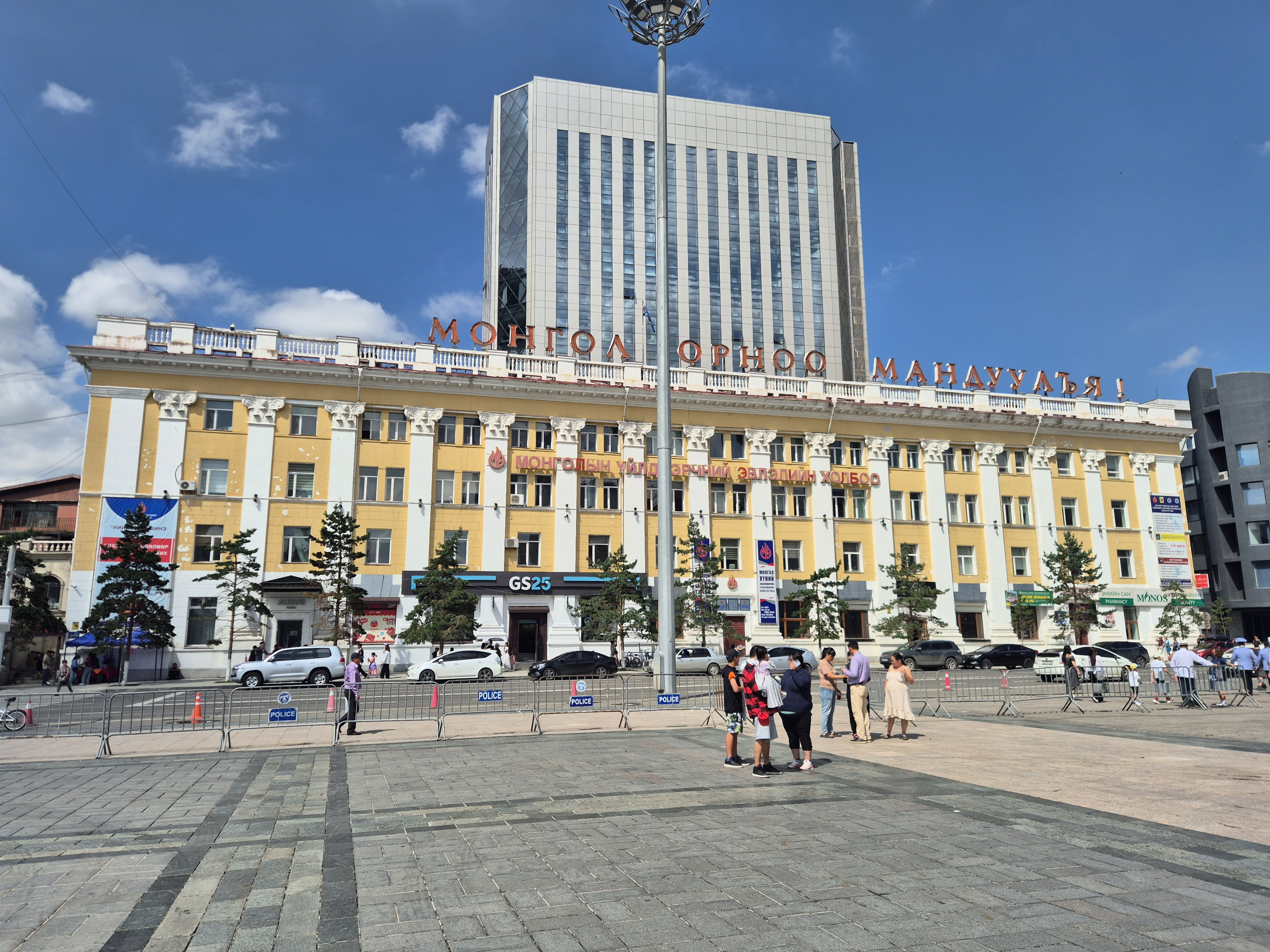
- CMTU headquarters in Ulaanbaatar
- Abbreviation: CMTU (English); МҮЭХ (Mongolia)
- Formation: 1927
- Type: National trade union center
- Headquarters: Sükhbaatar, Ulaanbaatar
- Location: Mongolia
- Members: 230,000 (2025)
- Publication: Khödölmör ("Labour")
- Affiliations: ITUC
- Website: www.cmtu.mn

The Confederation of Mongolian Trade Union (CMTU, Mongolian: Монголын Yйлдвэрчний Эвлэлийн Холбоо, MҮЭХ, romanized: Mongolyn Üildverchnii Evleliin Kholboo) is the national trade union center of Mongolia. It was founded in 1927 as the Central Council of Mongolian Trade Unions. The CMTU is divided into 10 industrial unions and 22 regional confederations, the latter of which comprise 2300 primary trade union organizations.

The CMTU was affiliated with the World Federation of Trade Unions until 1991. It has since joined the International Trade Union Confederation.

The CMTU was previously tied to the Mongolian People's Revolutionary Party, the former sole legal party of the Mongolian People's Republic. In 1990, after the 1990 Democratic Revolution, the link between the party and the trade union was broken.

== Member industrial unions ==
- Federation of Mongolian Employees and Civil Servants' Union
- Federation of Mongolian Road Workers' Union
- Federation of Mongolian Builders' Union
- Federation of Mongolian Education and Science Union
- Federation of Mongolian Small and Medium-sized Enterprises, Commerce, Service, Tourism Union
- Federation of Mongolian Integrated Trade Union
- Federation of Mongolian Transport, Communication and Petroleum Workers' Union
- Federation of Mongolian Railway Workers' Union
- Federation of Mongolian Urban Development and Public Works Workers' Union
- Federation of Mongolian Food, Agriculture, and Environmental Union
- Federation of Mongolian Health Workers' Union
- Federation of Mongolian Energy, Geology, and Mining Union
- Federation of Mongolian Industrial Union
