= Friendly Islands Teachers' Association =

FITA
- Friendly Islands Teachers' Association
- Headquarters: Nukuʻalofa, Tonga
- Location: Tonga
- Key people: Tokankamea Puleiku, general secretary
- Affiliations: ITUC, EI

The Friendly Islands Teachers' Association (FITA) is the only trade union of teachers in Tonga. It is affiliated with the International Trade Union Confederation and Education International. The union is incorporated, but not registered.
