= All-Japan Seamen's Union =

Trade union in Japan

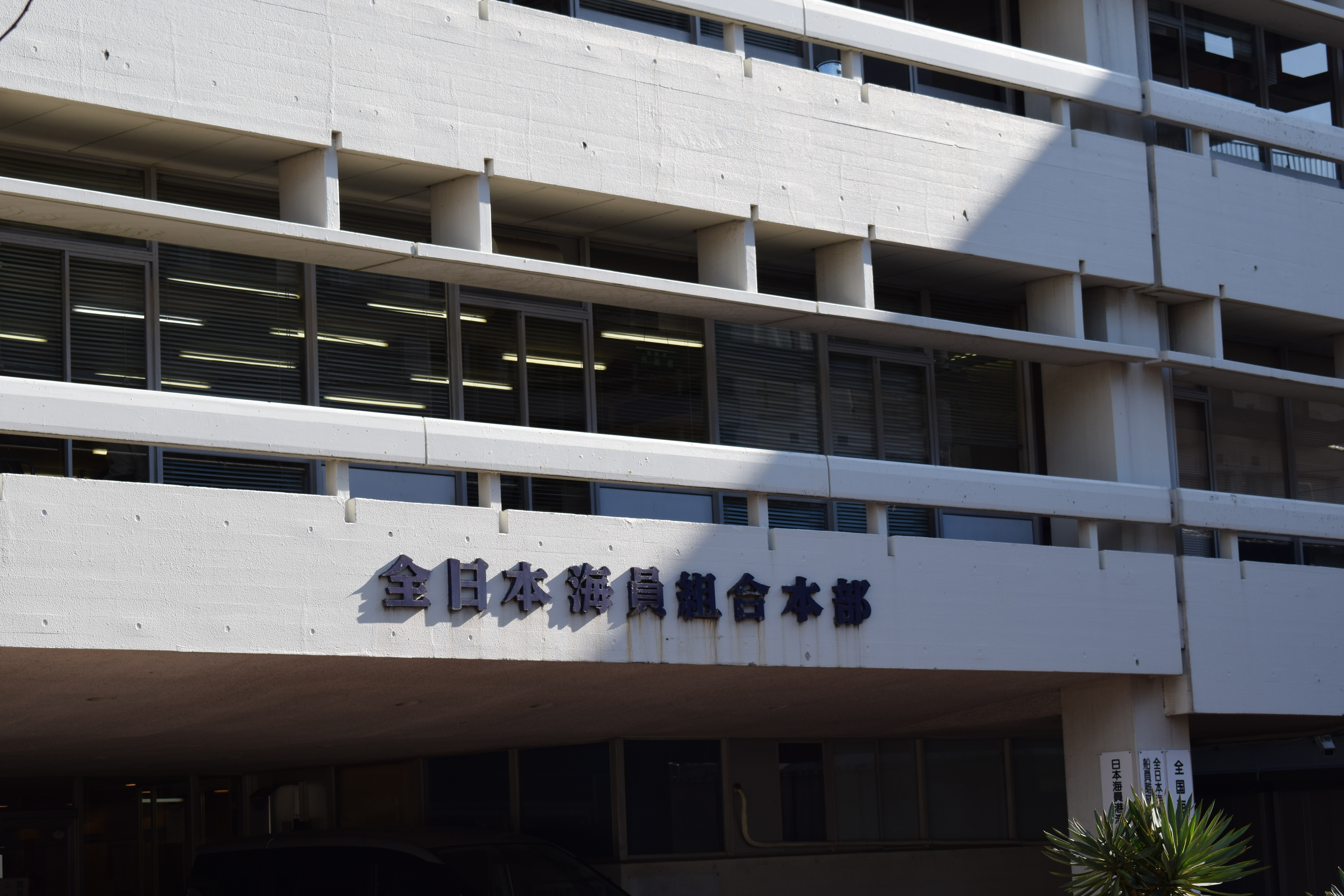
Headquarters of All Japan Seaman's Union in Roppongi, Minato, Tokyo, Japan.

The All-Japan Seamen's Union (JSU; Japanese: 全日本海員組合, Kaiin) is a trade union representing seafarers and harbour workers in the marine industry, in Japan.

The union was founded on 5 October 1945, as the successor to the pre-war Japan Seamen's Union. It was a founding affiliate of the National Trade Union Council, but as that federation moved to the left, it quit and formed the All-Japan Trade Union Congress. From 1960, it supported the Democratic Socialist Party, but dropped this in 1973.

In 1964, the union was a founding affiliate of the Japanese Confederation of Labour, and by 1967 it had 142,935 members. It is now affiliated to the Japanese Trade Union Confederation, and as of 2010 had around 76,000 members, the majority of whom are not Japanese citizens.

== Presidents ==
Hisashi Kageyama
1959: Kumazo Nakachi
1966: Yuki Murakami
1980: Kazukiyo Doi
1988: Shoshiro Nakanishi
2000:
2010: Yoji Fujisawa
Yasumi Morita
