= Federation of Free Workers =

FFW
- Federation of Free Workers
- Founded: 19 June 1950
- Headquarters: FFW Building, 1943 Taft Avenue, Malate, Manila, Philippines
- Location: Philippines
- Members: 200,000
- Key people: Atty. Sonny Matula, National President; Mr. Oliver Mondigo, National Vice President
- Affiliations: ITUC, ITUC-Asia Pacific, BWI, EI and INDUSTRIALL
- Website: https://www.freeworkers.org.ph/

The Federation of Free Workers (FFW) is a national trade union center in the Philippines. It was founded 19 June 1950, and has a dues-paying membership of around 40,000.

The FFW is affiliated with the International Trade Union Confederation.
