= Peppy Kids Club =

English conversation school in Japan

- Company type: Private owned by iTTTi.
- Industry: Language instruction
- Founded: 1989
- Headquarters: Nagoya, Japan
- Website: www.peppy-kids.com

Peppy Kids Club (ペッピーキッズクラブ, peppi kizzu kurabu) is a private eikaiwa English conversation school run by iTTTi Japan for children from 2.5 years old to high-school age. As of 2012, Peppy Kids Club has over 1400 locations with 95,000 students in every prefecture including Okinawa. As of February 2011 it had 1627 Japanese and 421 foreign staff. Teachers at Peppy Kids Club teach independently and are responsible for the welfare of the students from the time they arrive at the classroom to the time the students' parents pick them up.

The Japanese teachers act as a manager and caretaker for a specific classroom. They teach three out of four weekly lessons. A foreign teacher then teaches the fourth lesson from a separate curriculum.

== General Union branch ==
=== Establishment and early negotiations ===
In July 2012 the Osaka-based General Union founded a branch at Peppy Kids Club. The branch was formally declared to the company, and demands were submitted. The demands were for the working rules to be made available to all staff, an explanation of how the company ensures all staff are enrolled in unemployment insurance, and that when teachers are sent on business trips, that the company should directly pay for the hotel rather than requiring the teacher to do so and then reimbursing them.

The company immediately involved a lawyer, who responded to the union, and negotiations were held on August 6, 2012, with the company to respond to the union's demands in writing by August 17, 2012 The company claimed this was always official policy nationwide and that where it did not happen, it was a result of communication errors between head office and a branch office. The union subsequently announced that the company had agreed to prepay for hotels when it was necessary for teachers to stay in them for one or two nights. The union also announced that the company would now reimburse teachers for receipts even when there were small errors with the company name written on the receipt.

The union highlighted the fact that Japanese teachers, who are the majority of Peppy's teaching staff, were not enrolled in unemployment insurance, and also work longer hours than the foreign staff. A new confidentiality agreement was proposed which the union saw as an attempt to "intimidate JTs [Japanese Teachers] and put them in their place".

The General Union is part of the National Union of General Workers (NUGW), which is itself affiliated with the National Trade Union Council (Zenrokyo).

=== Dismissal of branch chair ===
Subsequently, the company non-renewed the chair of the GU union branch, after eight years of employment. The company claimed that he was fired for poor performance and that he "failed to improve as a teacher", but according to the union the teachers evaluations had been in the 96-97% range so this reason was simply a pretext and the real reason for the dismissal was union busting. The union demanded that the firing be revoked, with a deadline of November 8, 2012, but the company declined to do so.

This led other teachers to join the union, and the GU filed an unfair labor practice with the Osaka Labor Relations Commission over the company's breaches of the Trade Union Act of 1949. The union advised the company that they planned to push ahead with strike action, and the company counteracted by removing the branch chair from the teaching schedule, and began calling other teachers wanting to know details of strikes, which intimidated teachers and was another breach of trade union law.

Subsequently strikes started at the company. A settlement was brokered and the branch chair returned to work. The company subsequently attempted to non-renew him again, and strikes started once again.

=== Resolution of dispute ===
Union action continued, and a grievance procedure was established. The dispute over the dismissal of the branch chair was later resolved by mediation at the Osaka Labor Relations Commission in 2016.
