= 2007–2008 Berlitz Japan strike =

The Berlitz Japan 2007–2008 strike was a strike held by Berlitz Japan teachers of the Berlitz General Union Tokyo (Begunto), which was part of the National Union of General Workers (NUGW) before moving to Tozen Union in 2019. Beginning in December 2007 and continuing until November 2008, it grew into the longest and largest sustained strike among language teachers in Japan. Although the union had ceased strike action in November 2008, on December 3, 2008 Berlitz Japan sued the union and seven individual union officials for ¥110 million each (US$1,178,430) in the Tokyo District Court. The union took Berlitz to the Labor Commission for firing two teachers and several other complaints. Berlitz' suit against the union was dismissed by the Tokyo District Court on 27 February 2012, with "all claims rejected" but Berlitz decided within a week that it would appeal its loss to the High Court. After further negotiations and legal wrangling Berlitz's High Court case against the union was withdrawn on December 27, 2012.

A little over five years after the strike initially started matters were finally concluded with the union winning a raise and a bonus for teachers at Berlitz Japan.

== Background ==
Berlitz Japan is a subsidiary of Berlitz International, owned by Benesse Corporation. Some staff in the Kanto area are represented by the Berlitz General Union Tokyo (Begunto). Begunto was a part of the National Union of General Workers Tokyo Nambu, which is itself affiliated to the National Union of General Workers (NUGW). The NUGW is in turn affiliated to the National Trade Union Council (Zenrokyo).

Until 2003, when Benesse took majority control of Berlitz, all teachers would get an annual base-up raise on June 18, as well as a seniority bonus. Since Benesse bought the company, there has been no across-the-board base-up increase.

While Berlitz offered contracts of less than 30 hours a week (thereby avoiding paying for health insurance and pension for their workers) Paul Baca, Begunto Vice-President at the time the strike started, stated that actual working hours come close to 40 when unpaid lesson preparation time and times between lessons were included.

Catherine Campbell, Begunto President, stated that workers hired since 2005 were essentially being paid less, because they were paid 250,000 yen per month, but had to teach 40 lessons a week. Other teachers, hired before 2005, had to teach 35 lessons per week. Teachers hired in the early 1990s only had to teach 30 lessons per week. Berlitz lessons in Japan are for 40 minutes.

In 2005, the union took action over a number of grievances, and claimed this forced Berlitz management into paying the performance increase for that year. But there was no across-the board pay increase or bonus.

Its “Language Company” sector had been taking losses during 2004, but in the fiscal year 2007, its operation profits were 34.9 billion yen. That sector accounted for 16% of the Benesse's total sales and 18% of its profits.

For the last 6 months of 2007, Berlitz told its teachers that it had no money to give raises. In September 2007, there was an event at the Keio Plaza Hotel to which teachers were invited, but which they had to pay to attend.

== Beginning ==
On December 13, 2007, Berlitz management held a party at the Roppongi Hills Grand Hyatt to celebrate good financial results. The strike started this evening, with teachers picketing the hotel.

Less than two weeks later, the Japan Business Federation encouraged member firms to pay workers more. In March 2008, then-Prime Minister Yasuo Fukuda concurred, saying that "I think now is the time when the fruits of reform should be passed on to the people and household budgets."

By May 2008, at least 55 teachers had struck at a 16 different schools. Berlitz had managers wait in coffee shops ready to step in if teachers went on strike, and also asked other teachers to cover the lessons. Some teachers refused, but others did, leading to some tension between union and non-union teachers.

By September 2008, more than 100 teachers had struck at dozens of different schools around the Kanto region, and it had become the largest sustained strike in the history of Japan's language schools. The union held demonstrations, hired a sound bus to advertise their campaign around Tokyo, and more than half the Berlitz schools in Kanto had participated.

In addition to striking regular lessons at Berlitz Learning Centers, union members assigned to outservice lessons also struck.

Berlitz continued to have teachers, which the union referred to as “caffeine cowboys”, on call ready to fill in for possible strikes. Louis Carlet, the Begunto union case officer, said that management had made two pay hike offers, but these were short of demands, and expected to be rejected by the union.

Berlitz has three pay scales, one called "seniority", one called "performance", and the other called "rank". One of the offered pay raises was only for teachers on the "seniority" system, and to accept it would have split the union.

The union had reduced its original nine demands to two: a 4.6% base-pay raise for all teachers and staff, and a bonus equal to one month's salary. After management offered a raise of less than 1% in September 2008, the union rejected it. Strikes continued, leafleting sessions increased, and on October 22 there was a demonstration in front of Benesse's HQ in Tama plaza, which was supported by members of the Kawasaki City Union. The union demanded that Benesse address the issue of the strike. Protests and threats of litigation soon followed.

On November 10, 2008, Berlitz sent letters to striking teachers telling them that the strike was illegal and they should stop. It also posted memos at all Berlitz branches to the same effect.

The union held a meeting and decided that although they believed the strike was legal, they did not want to risk the possibility that striking workers might be fired, and suspended the strikes.

Since the start of the strike a year earlier, more than 100 English, Spanish, and French teachers had participated in spot strikes of almost 3,500 lessons - a total of 3455 strikes. Teachers at 32 of the 46 Kanto area schools had been on strike.

== Union Labor Commission Unfair Labor Practice case ==
On November 17, 2008 Begunto and NUGW Nambu filed a claim of an Unfair Labor Practice with the Tokyo Labor Commission, claiming that Berlitz had violated the Trade Union Law. The unions argued that the memos Berlitz Japan had posted at all its schools in November declaring the strike illegal and letters sent to union members telling them to end the strike were illegal interference, and thus in violation of Article 7 of the Act.

The union also asked the Labor Commission to investigate Berlitz Japan's refusal to meet the union's pay demands and failure to provide data on the company's finances to the union.

== Berlitz takes legal action ==
Soon after this, on December 3, 2008, Berlitz Japan sued the five teachers who served as volunteer Begunto executives, as well as two officials from the National Union of General Workers (NUGW), president Yujio Hiraga and Louis Carlet, the deputy general secretary and case officer for Begunto. Also, Berlitz sued NUGW Tokyo Nambu and Begunto, demanding 110 million yen from each defendant. In USD this sum was $1,178,430 per defendant. By way of comparison, a "semi full time contract" teacher at Berlitz earned a basic salary of ¥250,000 per month, or ¥3,000,000 ($32,139.1) per year.

According to a 2012 letter to The Japan Times from one of the union members involved in the strike, the company was motivated to sue by "a visit by a bilingual union leader accompanied by two members (I was one) to a corporate customer's office. The purpose of the visit was to explain the reason for the strike (I am sure they were not aware of it) and to assure them that the union was earnestly seeking an equitable resolution. The possibility of more corporate customers learning of the strike and perhaps cancelling contracts is what prompted Berlitz to swat the mosquito with a sledgehammer."

Takashi Araki, law professor at Tokyo University, and American lawyer Timothy Langley both regarded the litigation as unusual, as it is very uncommon for companies to sue striking workers.

== Tokyo District Court case ==
The first court hearing at Tokyo District Court on January 26, 2009 was an anticlimax. The lawyers for Berlitz Japan failed to submit legal documents saying why the strike was illegal, saying that it would take until March to translate documents. Ken Yoshida, one of the lawyers for the teachers, expressed surprise that a language school would offer such an excuse.

Berlitz's lawyers gained more time to prepare evidence. The deadline was the end of March 2009. The lawyers submitted their documents 10 days late. The lawyers submitted 1000 forms used by the union to inform Berlitz that strikes would occur. They argued that because the union submitted them shortly before the lessons, the intent was to damage the company, and thus the strike was illegal. The company also claimed that Louis Carlet, then a NUGW union executive, had admitted to wanting to damage the company in a September 30, 2008, Zeit Gist column in The Japan Times.

In addition, Berlitz Japan had failed to properly serve three of the defendants. The first hearing lasted only 20 minutes, and another court date was scheduled for April 20.

Tadashi Hanami, professor at Sophia University, knew of no similar case. Professor Gerald McAlinn of Keio Law School also said it was very unusual for a company to choose to sue workers on the grounds that the strike was illegal.

Given this, Hideyuki Morito, professor of law at Sophia University, noted that this was going to be an important case.

The April 20th second hearing in the case lasted minutes. One of the judges complained that he could not understand Berlitz's reason for claiming the strike was illegal. He told Berlitz's lawyers to provide a clear summary of their arguments before the next hearing.

Union representatives Catherine Campell and Louis Carlet were frustrated at the continual delays.

== Labor Commission case continues ==
On April 21, 2009, at the Tokyo Labor Commission, the union reported that Berlitz had made (and later retracted) threats to withhold performance-based raises from union members. It also said that since February 2009, lawyers took over from managers during collective bargaining sessions with the union. They claimed the Berlitz managers and lawyers had language difficulties and general communication problems. The previous session had been on March 13, 2009, and Berlitz rejected all demands.

== Tokyo District Court delays and ruling ==
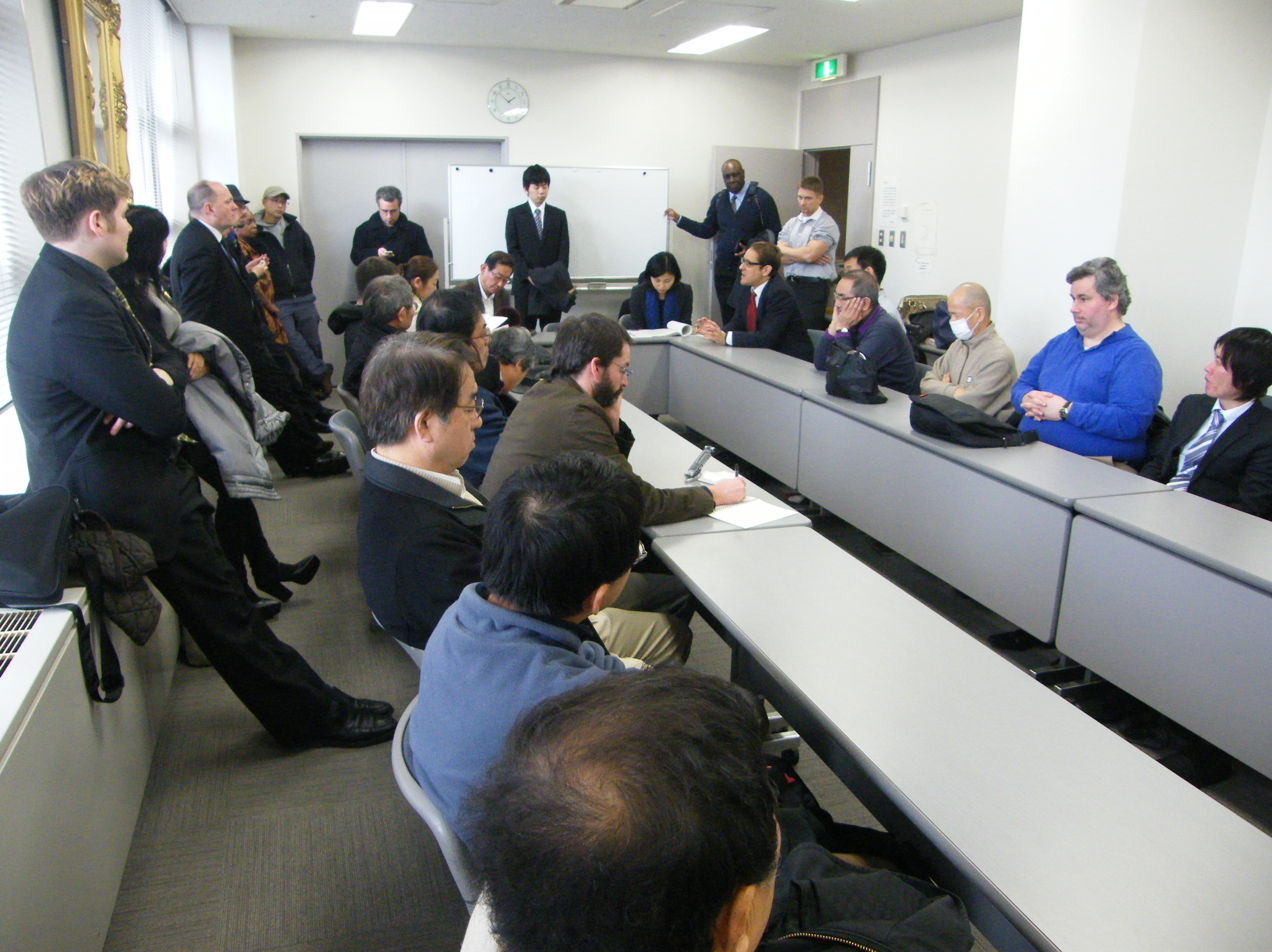
Union members and supporters hear the details of the Tokyo District Court ruling on February 27, 2012.

After months of court hearings, in December 2009 the company and the union, following the recommendation of Judge Watanabe, the lead judge in the case, entered talks. Once-a-month, 30-minute negotiating sessions were held.

In 2010 the negotiations were dealing with several issues, including the amount of notice union members should give if they intend to strike. In October 2010 the negotiations broke down and the court case resumed in December 2010.

Hearings continued and Berlitz' suit against the union was dismissed by the Tokyo District Court on 27 February 2012. The 43-page ruling was entirely in the union's favor, with all of the strikes conducted being recognized as legal by the court. The court's ruling said: "There is no reason to deny the legitimacy of the strike in its entirety and the details of its parts — the objective, the procedures, and the form of the strike. Therefore there can be no compensation claim against the defendant, either the union or the individuals. And therefore it is the judgement of this court that all claims are rejected."

According to Yumiko Akutsu, one of the lawyers for the union, the win was "a complete victory — on not one point did we lose, not one single point." However, within a week of the ruling Berlitz had decided to appeal to the high court.

== Berlitz fires teachers ==
In July 2010 Berlitz fired two of the teachers it was suing. One, in the Yokohama school, was a US Army reservist and was fired after being ordered to Afghanistan. He had been allowed to take leave for military service several times before.

Former Begunto President Catherine Campbell was also fired. She had taken unpaid leave to recover from breast cancer. Berlitz had not enrolled her in the shakai hoken (Japanese national medical insurance) which would have provided her with two-thirds of her regular income while receiving treatment in Japan. She therefore had to live with her parents in Canada, and Berlitz fired her after she wanted to extend her unpaid leave until September 2010.

== Conclusion of initial Labor Commission Case ==
The original labor commission case, lodged in 2008 continued until almost the end of 2012, before being withdrawn by the union as part of negotiations. The final hearing was held on December 11, 2012.

== Tokyo High Court ==
After Berlitz Japan appealed their loss to the High Court, the court began overseeing reconciliation talks between the union and Berlitz. The first court date was on May 28, 2012. and the final hearing was held on December 27, 2012, where an agreement was struck between the company and the union.

== Union and company agreement ==
Berlitz withdrew their High Court appeal, and agreed to pay a base-up raise to current union members plus a lump sum bonus to the union. In return the union agreed to new rules regarding industrial action. Under the new rules, the union must agree to notify the company of future industrial action three weeks in advance, during which time negotiations would continue. If strikes go ahead the union must notify the company 45 minutes in advance.

New rules for collective bargaining were also established. They will again be conducted in English, after the language was changed to Japanese previously. Berlitz also promised to disclose more financial information to the union. The company also promised not to use warning letters issued during the strike against the union members in question, but it refused to remove them from the instructor's files.
