= General Union (Japan) =

Trade union in Japan

- ゼネラルユニオン
- Founded: June 1991; 34 years ago
- Headquarters: Osaka
- Location: Japan
- Affiliations: National Trade Union Council (全労協), National Union of General Workers (全国一般全国協議会)
- Website: www.generalunion.org

The General Union (ゼネラルユニオン, zeneraru yunion) is a labor union founded in 1991 and headquartered in Osaka, Japan. Membership is open to all nationalities and all workers. It has members working in trading companies, factories and restaurants but the majority of members are teachers and staff who are employed in language education at private conversation schools, high schools and universities in the Kansai and Chubu regions of Japan. Union members work at universities such as Ritsumeikan University, and language schools such as ECC, Berlitz and Gaba. Recent years have also seen the union launching major organizing drives among South American workers in Japan, along with Filipino workers.

As of the 2020 executive elections the union chair is Asari Toshiaki and general secretary is Dennis Tesolat who reverted to this position after six years as chair.

The General Union is under the umbrella of the National Union of General Workers, which is itself part of the National Trade Union Council (Zenrokyo) one of the three major trade union federations in Japan.

== Founding of the union ==
With the founding of the Osaka Zenrokyo (a local area affiliated to Zenrokyo, National Trade Union Council) on 2 February 1991, it was decided that a general union type union was necessary to help both individual workers and groups of otherwise unorganized workers deal with their employment problems.

On 12 June 1991, the General Union was founded at a meeting at Apio Osaka. During the preparatory period prior to the founding the General Union had already organized a union branch at ELC Junior among female Japanese teachers. In May, the union's first foreign member had joined from HAL English School regarding a dispute with wages. By its founding the General Union had already started to establish itself among language school teachers and foreign language teachers.

During its first year the union also became involved with study groups for civil servants' employment rights, and established links with other immigrant groups namely Asian Friends (a joint employment problems hotline was run on 2 and 3 September) and with RINK (Rights of Immigrants Network in Kansai) in which the General Union was a founding organization.

While the union's attempts to establish itself among civil servants did not bear fruit, the union's work with foreign language teachers continued to expand. In 1991, the union also dealt with employment problems at Neverland English School (paid holidays, unpaid wages), OIC (Oxford), and IES (International Educational Services).

== Early history ==
Believing that there was a need for a larger union presence in English language schools the General Union held two public meetings for foreign teachers. On 23 March 1992 the first meeting signed up 60 new members and was reported widely in the press.

1992 also brought the first non-English speaking foreign workers to the union. The union represented Filipino workers at Tanaka Metal Works and Brazilian dispatch workers in Gunma at Takechi Rubber.

The General Union's first branch representing foreign university teachers was founded at Hannan University. The union's intervention prevented the university from lowering the per class rate for teachers.

In what would become a precursor to the union's campaigns over social insurance in the late 1990s and throughout 2000, the union held a seminar titled, "Social Insurance and Tax for foreigners" on 8 November 1992.

A strike winning two months' bonus at ELC Junior on 17 July 1992 also marked the union's first strike.

In 1993 the GU's first major language school branches were formed. Union members participated in the 1993 Shunto. One picketed employer was IES regarding a Canadian English teacher who was dismissed.

By the end of August the union claimed 100 members and had four workplace branches. One branch consisted of foreign instructors working for Interac. The Interac Branch was formed in May and by August had already gone on strike against unfair labour practices regarding the dismissal of a union member. The company later withdrew the dismissal and the strike was won. This first strike at Interac would mark the beginning of a long dispute between the union and the company and would give the union its first major nationwide coverage on prime time television and newspapers.

By the end of 1993 the union claimed 140 members, almost half of whom were Japanese, and two more language school branches; Osaka YMCA and Berlitz.

1994 saw the bankruptcies of two language schools in Japan. On 25 March Attony went bankrupt and teachers formed a General Union branch in order to deal with their lost wages. The General Union's experience with Attony was then used to help teachers at Bilingual which went bankrupt on 25 July. These were the first of more bankruptcies that would follow in the 90s and ending with the major NOVA bankruptcy in 2007.

Another major event of 1994 in the language teaching industry was the September arrest of a NOVA teacher for possession of marijuana. This led the school to demand the drug testing of all its foreign employees. On 6 September, the General Union NOVA branch was declared to the company. Union members refused to be drug tested which led to the 18 September visit by NOVA executive officer, Anders Lundqvist, to apologize for the company's policy. The policy though abandoned would lead to later conflict as the company refused to remove the drug testing stipulation from the employment contract.

The General Union founded more union branches in this year. On 17 May the union's Nichibei Eigo Gakuin branch was formed at its first collective agreement was secured. In the university sector the General Union started its long battle against contract renewal limits. On 31 March a union member was fired by Osaka Gakuin University after three-year contract limits were opposed. The union's battle went to the Supreme Court of Japan and was featured in a Newsweek article. Seven teachers at Otemon Gakuin University also joined the university and formed a branch to fight contract renewals. The union was able to save all the members' jobs.

== GEOS - First strikes at national language school chain ==
In mid 1995 union members at GEOS started organising a union branch. The branch was declared to the company on 7 November 1995.

== Union's campaign to win health and pension rights for foreign workers ==
Due to pressure from the General Union, in March 2005, the Japanese Government's Social Insurance Agency began to investigate English language schools in Japan for non-payment of Social Insurance (社会保険,, Shakai Hoken). In general, non-enrollment of full-time employees is illegal in Japan—the Health Insurance Law and Employees' Pension Law stipulate that companies must enroll all workers who have been in Japan for over two months in both the health insurance and pension systems, regardless of nationality. Shakai Hoken cover for employees also includes sickness and injury allowance. The burden of payment is split between employer and employee, with each paying about half the monthly premium amount.

The General Union (Osaka) has official consultative status with the United Nations Economic and Social Council (ECOSOC).

== Shakai Hoken lawsuit ==
A GU member working a 29.5-hour-per-week contract at an ALT dispatch agency requested the Japan Pension Service to enroll them in shakai hoken (health insurance and pension) after their company refused to do so. The Japan Pension Service has a memo which states that workers who work three-quarters of a full-time schedule should be enrolled in shakai hoken. The JPS has applied this internal bureaucratic guideline to avoid enrolling workers, forcing the workers to pay such costs by themselves. The JPS also refused to enroll them citing the three-quarter guideline. The member, with the support of the GU, has now sued the JPS for negligence in not following the Health Insurance Law and the Employees' Pension Law. The first hearing was held in the Tokyo District Court on April 13, 2012.

On March 20, 2015, the court ruled that there was no law that denied shakai hoken enrolment based on working hours, and that the worker in question had in any case been working over the limit for mandatory enrolment so it was illegal that he was not enrolled at that the government had turned down the request for enrolment.

== Protecting workers from Sexual Harassment ==
After a number of incidents where union members were harassed by students in their workplaces, in 2013 the union appointed both male and female sexual harassment officers to be a contact point for those who have suffered sexual harassment.

== Structure of the union ==
The general union consists of three main areas, the Industrial and Commercial Sector, the Schools and Colleges Sector, and the Private Language Industry Sector.

=== Industrial and Commercial Sector ===
This area of the GU is focused on workers in factories and other industrial employment. It consists of the General Branch, the South American Branch, and the Shinobu Foods Branch. The South American branch is currently active at many workplaces including Fuso and Daisen Kosakusho.

=== Schools and Colleges Sector ===
This area of the GU is focused on workers employed in schools and universities. The GU has members at many workplaces, including Ashiya Gakuen High School, Himeji Dokkyo University, Kansai Gaidai University, Kun'ei High School, Osaka Gaigo, Ritsumeikan University, Kobe Shoin Women's University, and Osaka University.

=== Private Language Industry ===
This area of the GU is focused on the teaching of language in the private sector, including workers at eikaiwas and working as ALTs. Amongst other companies it has members at Berlitz Japan, Interac, Gaba, Nova, OTC, Epion, the British Council, ECC, Panasonic Excel International, Coco Juku and Peppy Kids Club.

==== Berlitz branch ====
The GU branch of Berlitz Japan was founded in 1993, and since that time has won a number of improvements for teachers including: Unemployment Insurance and Workers Accident Compensation Insurance enrollment for MG teachers. Health and Pension Insurance (shakai hoken) enrollment for those who work over 30 hours per week. Paid holidays for MG and per lesson teachers. Premium pay of 25% overtime and 35% for work on a set rest day. The right to refuse work on set rest days or national holidays. A pre-consultation agreement with the union before terminating, transferring or changing the working conditions of any union member. Resolving various grievances dealing with dismissals, health insurance, unfair treatment of teachers.

==== Coco Juku branch ====
===== Final payment for employees =====
Article 23 of Japan's Labor Standards Act states that when a worker completes work for an employer their final payment should be paid within seven days. Coco Juku does not follow this rule and pays employees the next month. In 2014 a Coco Juku employee who was resigning requested his pay within the seven days mandated by law, and was refused. The General Union became involved and made contact with Nichii Gakkan, the parent company of Coco Juku. Nichii Gakkan ordered Coco Juku to make the payment within the seven days, which the company did.

===== Company shutdown =====
After the closing down of the company was announced in early 2019, instructors teaching English were offered either three months severance package or to be transferred to Gaba Corporation, also owned by Nichii Gakkan. The General Union negotiated with the company and gained continued employment at 100% payment of salary while negotiations were ongoing.

==== Nova branch ====
===== Establishment and action against discriminatory drug tests =====
In 1994, after two Nova instructors were arrested on drug charges in August and September, Nova asked all 3,100 instructors to sign an agreement to have a mandatory drug test, the results of which would be reported to the police. The drug test only applied to foreign staff. This action led to the GU branch of the Eikaiwa Nova being founded on September 6, 1994. At the same time there was also a NUGW Nova branch founded in Kanto.

The Osaka Bar Association wrote an opinion that the policy was a violation of the teachers' right to privacy. Nova claimed consent forms had been received from more than 90 percent of employees. According to the union, no instructors were ever required to take a drug test.

===== GU forces re-investigation of Nova President Nozomu Sahashi =====
After Nova's bankruptcy, the GU sought Sahashi's indictment over non-payment of wages. The Osaka prosecutor's office declined to do so, so the GU appealed to the prosecutor's auditors, who found the lack of indictment "unjust".

===== Allowances protected =====
After the March 11th 2011 earthquake, when embassies were urging their citizens to evacuate, Nova pressured instructors to move to Tokyo or have allowances cut. The GU members at one Nova branch protested and negotiated with Nova and the allowances were repaid.

===== Firing of disabled teacher withdrawn =====
In August 2013 Nova announced that they were non-renewing the contract of a teacher, in effect firing him. The teacher had a medical condition that made commuting difficult, but had never caused him to be late or affected his work. Previously the company had reduced his hours for two years in a row, which had resulted in him being removed from the Japanese government social insurance. As the teacher's condition was made worse by stress, he didn't pursue this. After he was non-renewed, the GU protested strenuously, meeting company representatives on August 21. Union representatives criticised the Nova for a "lack of humanity" and raised the prospect of demonstrations over the issue. During the meeting Nova withdrew the non-renewal.

==== ECC branch ====
===== Establishment and improvements gained =====
The GU branch of the Osaka-based English conversation school ECC was declared on February 26, 1996. Since then the union has achieved quite a few things at ECC, including English pay slips, flexible paid holidays, unemployment insurance, health and pension insurance, a toll-free number for Kinki district sub-teachers, improved emergency evacuation procedures, a pre-consultation agreement to consult with the union before making changes that affect union members, and mandatory training is now conducted during working hours (or else paid at overtime rates).

===== Moves towards permanent employment =====
From April 2013 teachers have the right to become seishain (permanent employees). Two employees (office staff) were promoted to seishain in 2013.

===== Collective agreement over contract renewal =====
On July 29, 2013 the GU and ECC signed a collective agreement that GU members would always have their contracts renewed unless there were exceptional circumstances.

==== Interac branch ====
===== Establishment and industrial action =====
The GU branch of Interac, a company that dispatches teachers to various companies and public schools, was declared on May 25, 1993. A number of teachers who wanted to improve conditions joined the GU. Negotiations were not fruitful and the union went to dispute mode, with strikes, picketing, and the dispute received a large amount of press coverage.

===== Actions against illegal itaku contracts =====
In 2007 the GU surveyed boards of education in Osaka prefecture, and found that 23 of them were employing Assistant Language Teachers through illegal itaku contracts. The union reported this to the Osaka Labor Bureau and the boards of education were ordered to stop.

2009 was a busy year for the GU Interac branch. Interac teachers working at Kurashiki in Okayama prefecture, approached the local board of education. They sought to be hired directly, rather than being employed by Interac and dispatched. The board of education refused the teachers, who then approached the GU. The GU took up the case on their behalf, and after threats of losing their jobs and attempts to evict teachers from city-provided accommodation, the GU won direct hire for 4 out of 7 members from the Kurashiki board of education, and the other three members got dispatch positions in other areas in Okayama.

The GU also demanded that Interac enroll all its teachers in unemployment insurance.

In Autumn 2009 the GU sent a survey to all the city boards of education in Aichi prefecture. 16 replied that they used teachers on itaku contracts. On October 19, 2009, the GU sued Interac at the Osaka Labor Commission, submitted documents to the Aichi labor bureau, and visited the Aichi Prefectural Board of Education to inform the board of education that it was allowing illegal itaku contracts, the use of which breached the dispatch law and the employment security law.

===== Labor Commission case =====
In response to the Labor Commission case brought by the GU against Interac, on July 26, 2010 the Osaka Labor Commission ruled that Interac had committed an unfair labor practice by refusing to hold collective bargaining with the union. As a result, Interac was ordered to hand-deliver an apology to the union, and banned from bidding on government projects in Osaka Prefecture. Interac appealed the ruling to the Central Labor Commission in Tokyo, and on February 28, 2011 a settlement was brokered between Interac and the GU.

==== Peppy Kids Club branch ====
===== Establishment and early negotiations =====
In July 2012 the GU founded a branch at Peppy Kids Club. The branch was formally declared to the company, and demands made for the working rules to be available to all staff, an explanation of how the company ensures all staff are enrolled in unemployment insurance, and that when teachers are sent on business trips, that the company should directly pay for the hotel rather than requiring the teacher to do so and then reimbursing them.

The company immediately involved a lawyer, who responded to the union, and negotiations were held on August 6, 2012, with the company to respond to the union's demands in writing by August 17, 2012 The union subsequently announced that the company had agreed to prepay for hotels when it was necessary for teachers to stay in them for one or two nights. The company claimed this was always official policy nationwide and that where it did not happen, it was a result of communication errors between head office and a branch office. The union also announced that the company would now reimburse teachers for receipts even when there were small errors with the company name written on the receipt.

The union highlighted the fact that Japanese teachers, who are the majority of Peppy's teaching staff, were not enrolled in unemployment insurance, and also work longer hours than the foreign staff. A new confidentiality agreement was proposed which the union saw as an attempt to "intimidate JTs [Japanese Teachers] and put them in their place".

===== Dismissal of branch chair =====
Subsequently the company non-renewed the chair of the GU union branch, after eight years of employment. The company claimed that he was fired for poor performance and that he "failed to improve as a teacher", but according to the union the teachers evaluations had been in the 96-97% range so this reason was simply a pretext and the real reason for the dismissal was union busting. The union demanded that the firing be revoked, with a deadline of November 8, 2012, but the company declined to do so.

This led other teachers to join the union, and the GU filed an unfair labor practice with the Osaka Labor Relations Commission over the company's breaches of the Trade Union Act of 1949. The union advised the company that they planned to push ahead with strike action, and the company counteracted by removing the branch chair from the teaching schedule, and began calling other teachers wanting to know details of strikes, which intimidated teachers and was another breach of trade union law.

Subsequently strikes started at the company. A settlement was brokered and the branch chair returned to work. The company subsequently attempted to non-renew him again, and strikes started once again.

===== Resolution of dispute =====
Union action continued, and a grievance procedure was established. The dispute over the dismissal of the branch chair was later resolved by mediation at the Osaka Prefectural Labor Commission in 2016.

==== Gaba branch ====
===== Establishment and early discussions =====
Although the General Union generally is responsible for the Kansai and Nagoya areas, in 2007 it became involved in a campaign to organize instructors in the Tokyo-based English conversation school Gaba. On 6 September 2007, a union of Gaba's instructors was formed.

Union representatives had many discussions with the company around 2007. In 2007, Gaba raised its base lesson rate pay from 1,400 yen per lesson to 1,500 yen per lesson for unbelted instructors, and also raised the lesson rates for belted instructors. In addition, contract lengths were increased from four to six months, but no other changes were forthcoming. The General Union has long claimed that these changes were due to union pressure, but Gaba has maintained that the changes were being discussed in 2006, before the union came to Gaba, and that the changes were not related to union pressure.

===== First Labor Commission case =====
The union then took an unfair labor practice case through the Osaka Labor Relations Commission claiming that Gaba had not negotiated in good faith, which they are required to do under article 7 of the Trade Union law, and also to have instructors recognized as employees, not "entrusted independent" itaku (sub-contractors) which Gaba currently states they are.

The Osaka Labor Relations Commission case ran from July 2008 to August 2009. A ruling was given on Christmas Eve 2009. It stated that Gaba had not committed an unfair labor practice, because it had negotiated in good faith with the union. This was a victory for Gaba. However, the 35-page decision by the Labor Commission also included language that implied that Gaba's instructor contracting system had elements of labor and that Gaba instructors had the right to organize 'as employees'. This language was in turn interpreted by the General Union as a decision on the status of instructors, and through their web page declared that Gaba instructors are not itaku but employees under the trade union law. This did not immediately change the employment situation for Gaba instructors but the union said it would use this to win standard employment benefits (paid leave, unemployment insurance, health insurance, etc.) which Gaba does not currently give to instructors under their itaku contracts.

Despite winning the unfair labor practice case, Gaba was dissatisfied with the wording of the original ruling, specifically the references to the instructor contracting having elements of labor under the trade union law, and appealed to have the wording of the ruling amended to the Central Labor Commission in Tokyo. Hearings were held from March to July 2010.

On October 28, 2010, after several times encouraging Gaba to reach some form of compromise with the union, the Central Labor Commission rejected the company's claim to have the language in the original ruling by the Osaka Labor Commission changed, stating that Gaba's claim had "no merit". The Central Labor Committee dismissed Gaba's claim because they didn't have enough information either way and they felt it should be decided by a lower court (the Osaka Labor Committee). Despite the inconclusive nature of this decision, it was again interpreted by the General Union as a ruling that Gaba instructors are employees under trade union law, and they again announced a victory on their web site. Gaba then sued the Central Labor Commission in Tokyo District Court for rejecting their appeal, and the first hearing was held on January 19, 2011. As the Central Labor Commission is a government body under the umbrella of the Ministry of Health, Labour, and Welfare, this meant that the company was suing a Japanese government agency. The court's decision was handed down on July 27, 2011, and Gaba's appeal was rejected. The company appealed this to the Tokyo High Court, and the first hearing took place on November 15, 2011. After negotiations with the union the company agreed to withdraw this case and recognize the rights of its instructors under trade union law.

===== Hello Work =====
In August 2010, union members lodged applications with the Shibuya Hello Work office to be enrolled in unemployment insurance. After Hello Work had taken no action for almost a year, in June 2011, the GU made a formal complaint, in response to which Hello Work apologized and said they would launch an investigation immediately. The applications, still making their way through the bureaucracy, were later withdrawn by the GU as part of an agreement signed with Gaba.

===== SESC complaint =====
On October 4, 2010, the General Union made an official complaint to the Securities and Exchange Surveillance Commission, part of the Financial Services Agency, over compliance issues based on Gaba stating in its report for the 2009 financial year that there was no union at the company, and that labor relations were "smooth and harmonious", and also for failing to mention the Osaka Labor Commission case and Gaba's subsequent appeal to the Central Labor Commission in Tokyo.

===== Libel lawsuit =====
In addition to suing the government, Gaba decided to sue the General Union for libel, over an article on the union webpage dealing with Gaba's compliance. The company sued the union for 58 million yen in damages and legal costs. The first hearing was held on January 28, 2011, at the Tokyo District Court, and the company's suit was dismissed in November 2011. After negotiations with the union Gaba agreed not to appeal their loss.

===== Further Labor Commission case =====
After Gaba sued the General Union for libel, the union lodged another unfair labor practice, asking that the Osaka Labor Commission have Gaba cease interfering in union activities, withdraw their demand that the union remove the news article from their website, not intimidate the union and its members by litigation and other means, that then-majority stockholder Daiwa Securities negotiate with the union, and that Gaba pay the union 58,200,000 yen (the amount Gaba sued the union for) for interfering with union activities, and publicly apologize. The case was lodged on May 16, 2011, and was expected to last for some time. The union and Gaba signed an agreement in April 2012, and the case was withdrawn.

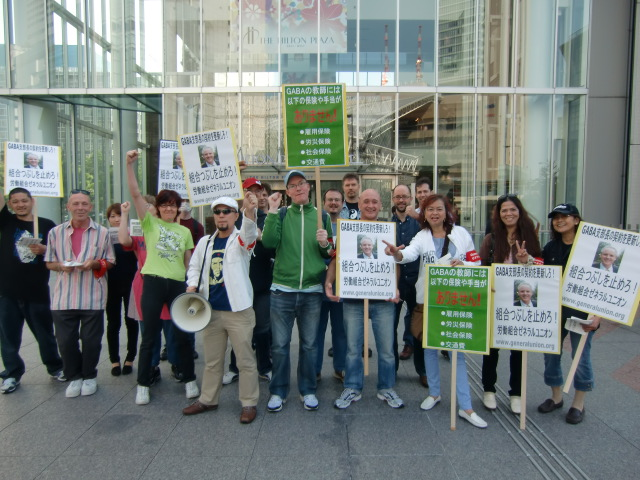
General Union demonstration at Umeda Learning Studio, Osaka

===== Non-renewal of union branch chair =====
After over 8 years as a Gaba instructor, Gaba non-renewed the contract of Francis Strange, the chair of the Gaba branch of the General Union, effective November 1, 2011. The union viewed this as union busting, and in October the union demonstrated and leafleted Learning Studios in Osaka and Tokyo, and negotiated with Gaba and new owner Nichii Gakkan in an effort to reverse the non-renewal. After negotiations Gaba agreed to rehire Strange and he returned to work on February 12, 2012.

===== General Union and Gaba sign agreement =====
In April 2012 Gaba and the General Union signed an agreement in which both sides withdrew their pending cases in the courts and government bureaucracy. Gaba agreed to negotiate in good faith on the issue of employment status and benefits for instructors.

===== General Union and Gaba begin negotiations =====
After signing the agreement to negotiate, the union and the company commenced negotiations on conditions on May 28, 2012, which are ongoing as of 2013.

===== Gaba promises improvements =====
The General Union Gaba branch held their first official collective bargaining session for 2013 with Gaba on March 4, 2013. The company's representatives said that they were "determined to improve working conditions for instructors" and that they were looking at increasing the TNT incentive and the per lesson pay rate.

===== Morning peak lesson pay increase =====
The General Union and company subsequently signed a collective agreement that from May 2013 all instructors working the first three weekday morning peak time lessons (the F-shift) would receive an additional 200 yen for every lesson taught. The agreement was officially signed and dated on June 17, 2013. and the first payday including the incentive was June 25, 2013. For instructors on the lowest pay rate (around 50% of the workforce) this meant a 13.3% pay increase for those lessons.

===== Grievance Procedure Agreement signed =====
On October 4, 2013 the General Union and Gaba Corporation signed a grievance procedure agreement. This legally requires the company to respond to workplace grievances related to individual instructors in a fair and prompt manner.

===== Dealing with Sexual Harassment from Clients to Instructors =====
From 2013 the General Union raised a number of incidents where Gaba clients had sexually harassed instructors. In response to this, the company changed their policy to make it easier for instructors to block students who behaved inappropriately and introduced a standardised form for ISLs (Instructor Support Leaders) to report harassment from clients to Gaba HQ.

In 2014 the Gaba Branch of the union appointed sexual harassment officers for instructors to speak to about incidents at work.

In 2015 Gaba staff deleted information on the system about a client who had harassed female instructors. An instructor who entered information about this so female instructors would be aware and could prepare themselves. The instructor was given a warning by the company and told not to do it again. The union protested this. Later in 2015 an instructor who warned a new instructor about a client who had harassed female instructors in the past was disciplined by the company, which the union also protested.

===== Requests to improve disaster preparations =====
The GU branch has raised safety issues a number of times with the company. In June 2014 it asked for drills at all learning studios. This didn't occur. In 2014 after the evacuation notice at the Shimbashi LS was found to have no evacuation site at all the union asked the company to correct this, which was done.

In 2014 the union also asked the company to comply with the Metropolitan Tokyo Ordinance on Measures for Stranded Individuals, to make sure that sufficient supplies were stockpiled at Learning Studios in case of disaster. The company stated that it had made preparations.

After major earthquakes in May 2015, the GU again asked the company to conduct drills at all learning studios and make sure that instructors, clients and staff are all prepared in case of disaster. A union survey found poor levels of preparation among instructors. The company stated in August 2015 that it plans to have drills "more often". Gaba held drills at 14 Learning Studios in late 2015 and early 2016. In July 2016 it also ran drills at three Learning Studios.

===== Gaba provides emergency preparations =====
After the General Union raised the issue a number of times, over July and August 2016 Gaba provided emergency kits to all booths in all 42 Gaba Learning Studios across Japan. The kits contain food, drink, and two helmets.

== See also ==
- National Trade Union Council
- National Union of General Workers
- Labor unions in Japan
- Japanese employment law
