= Berlitz Japan =

Chain of English conversation schools in Japan

Berlitz Japan, Inc. ベルリッツ・ジャパン株式会社
- Type: Subsidiary of Berlitz Corporation
- Industry: Global leadership training; Language services
- Founded: December 18, 1980
- Headquarters: Shinjuku, Tokyo
- Area served: Japan
- Parent: Berlitz Corporation
- Website: www.berlitz.co.jp

Berlitz Japan, Inc. (ベルリッツ・ジャパン株式会社) is a chain of eikaiwa English conversation schools in Japan. It is a branch of Berlitz Corporation, a subsidiary of ILSC Holdings LP.

As of 2014, it had 1,800 employees and in 2020 it had 60 branches located all around Japan. As of 2023, it has 44 branches, 4 of which are independently owned.

== History ==
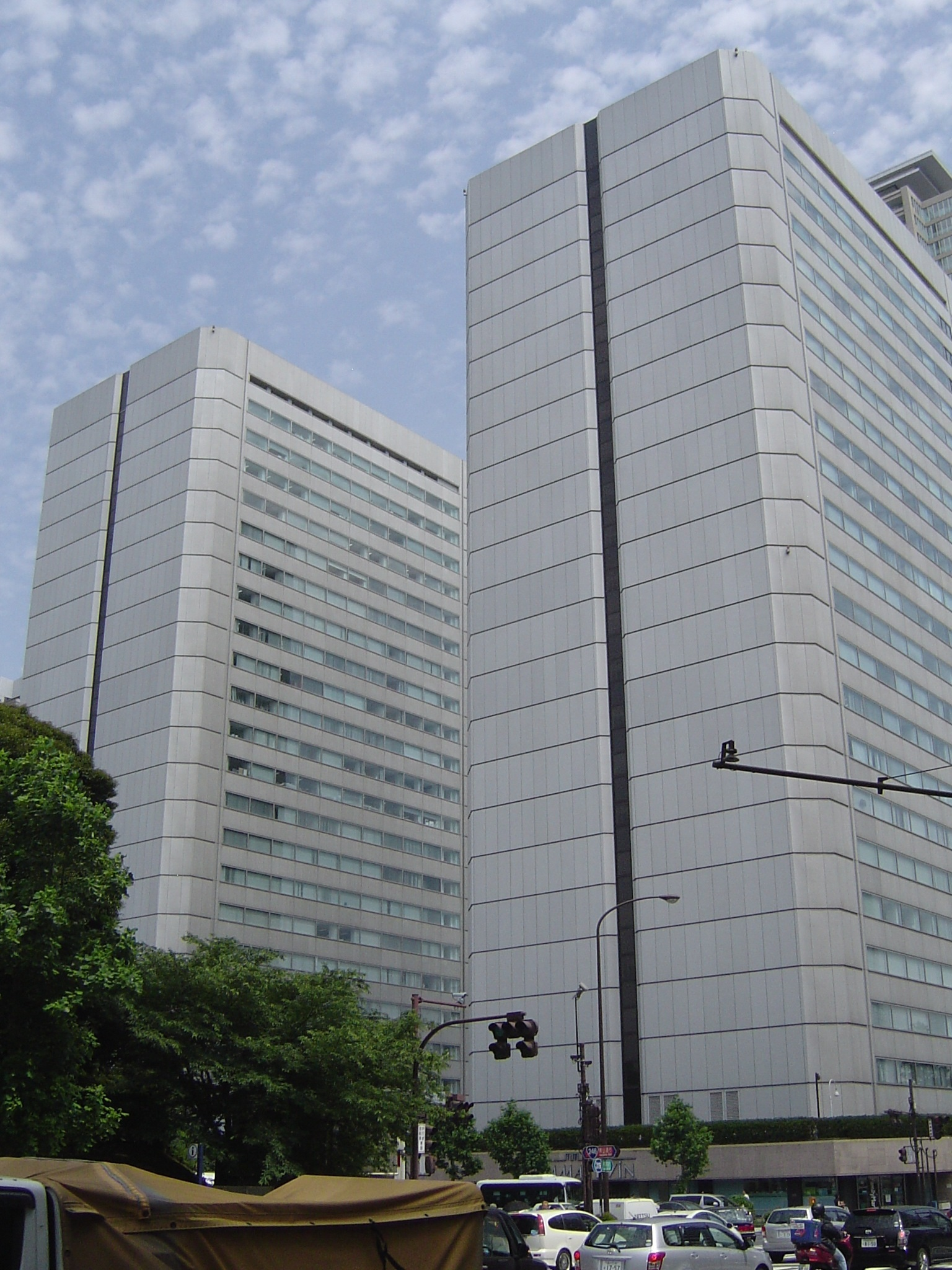
Shin Aoyama Building in Aoyama in Tokyo

Berlitz's first branch in Japan was established in Akasaka in 1966, in the midst of Japan's postwar economic boom. The Berlitz School of Languages, Inc's Japanese branch was established as an organization on December 18, 1980.

In 1990 Benesse Corporation acquired a stake in Berlitz International, and in 2001 Benesse completed their acquisition, owning 100% of Berlitz's stock.

In 2009 Berlitz Corporation acquired Phoenix Associates, which specialized in providing business and language training. Effective January 1, 2013 the company, which had 228 staff as of October 31, 2012, was fully merged into Berlitz Corporation.

In February 2022, as part of the sale of Berlitz Corporation to ILSC Holdings LP, Benesse decided to transfer all shares of Berlitz Japan (15.75% of all shares held by Benesse) to Berlitz Corporation.

== Headquarters ==
Berlitz Japan's headquarters are located on the 7th floor of the Nishi-Shinjuku Showa Building in Shinjuku, Tokyo.

== Branches ==
Berlitz Japan has learning centers located all across Japan. During the COVID-19 pandemic, several language centers were closed permanently. As of October 2023, 21 branches are located in Tokyo, eight in Kanagawa Prefecture, and three each in Chiba Prefecture and Osaka Prefecture. There is one each in Aichi Prefecture, Kyoto Prefecture, Hyogo Prefecture, Saitama Prefecture, Fukuoka Prefecture, and Hiroshima Prefecture. There are four independent language centers: two in Shizuoka, one in Okayama, and one in Hiroshima.

== Languages offered ==
English, French, German, Spanish, Italian, Portuguese, Russian, Chinese, Korean, Japanese, Arabic, Indonesian, Thai, Vietnamese, Dutch and others.

== Changes in conditions ==
In 1991 Berlitz teachers were required to do 30 lessons a week for a monthly salary of ¥250,000. As of 2013 they were required to do 40 lessons a week for the same salary. Starting from 2018 company started offering FTI (Full-Time Instructor) contracts with 50 lessons per week for ¥275,000 a month.

== Unions ==
In Japan, teachers at Berlitz are represented by several unions. In the Kansai region they are represented by the General Union, and in the Kanto region they are represented by Begunto, the Berlitz Tokyo General Union, part of the National Union of General Workers. Both unions belong to the National Trade Union Council.

=== General Union branch ===
The GU branch of Berlitz Japan was founded in 1993, and since that time has won a number of improvements for teachers including: Unemployment Insurance and Workers Accident Compensation Insurance enrollment for MG teachers. Health and Pension Insurance (shakai hoken) enrollment for those who work over 30 hours per week. Paid holidays for MG and per lesson teachers. Premium pay of 25% overtime and 35% for work on a set rest day. The right to refuse work on set rest days or national holidays. A pre-consultation agreement with the union before terminating, transferring or changing the working conditions of any union member. Resolving various grievances dealing with dismissals, health insurance, unfair treatment of teachers.

== Industrial action ==
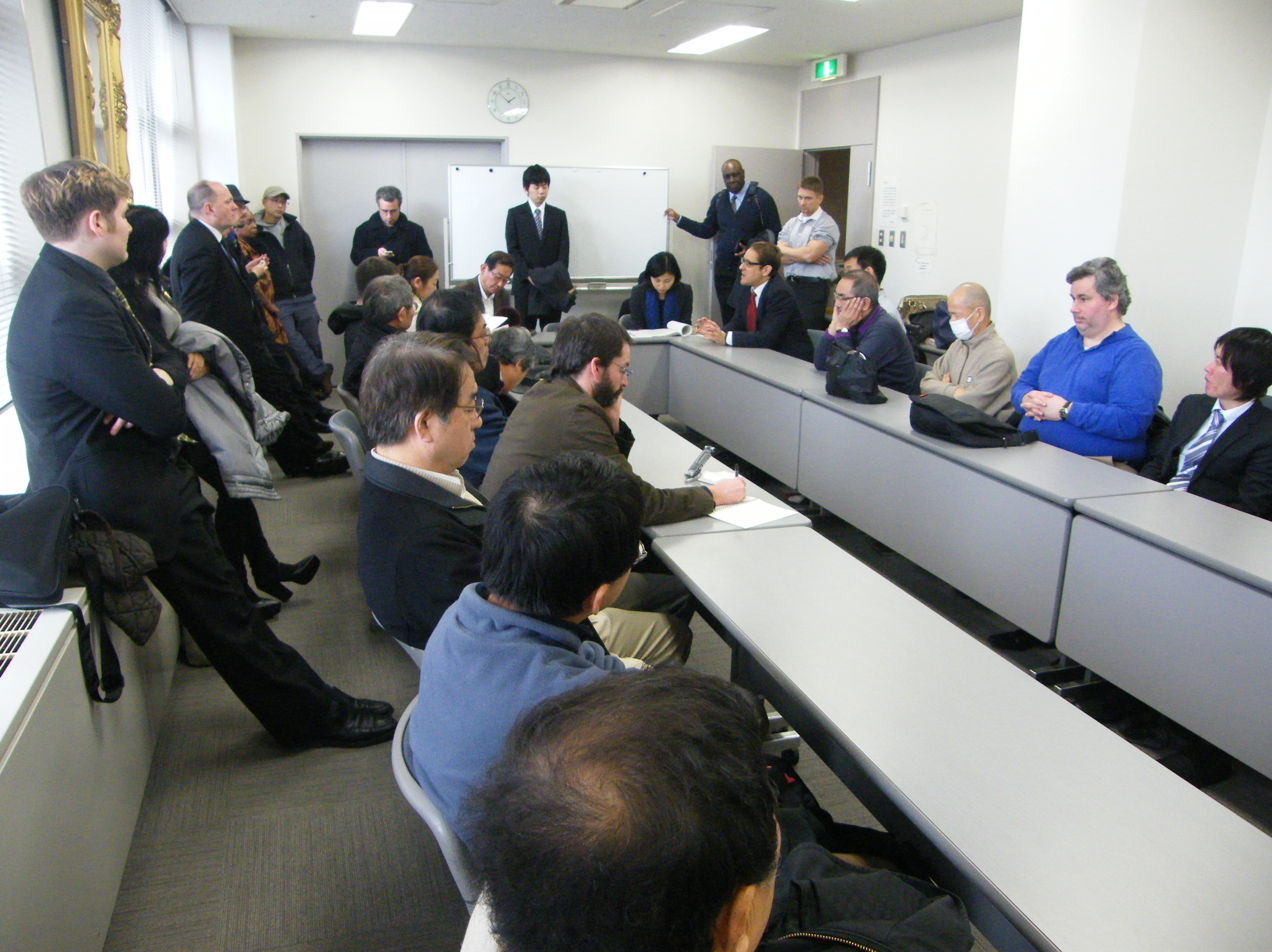
Union members and supporters hear the details of the Tokyo District Court ruling on February 27, 2012.

While the situation at Berlitz is different from country to country, in Japan there has been substantial industrial action, including the Berlitz Japan 2007-2008 Strike organized by Begunto, which grew into the longest and largest sustained strike among language teachers in Japan. Berlitz filed suit against the union for damages it says it suffered during the strike, but the claim was rejected by the Tokyo District Court on 27 February 2012. Within a week Berlitz had appealed the ruling to the high court, with the first court date being on May 28, 2012. The final hearing was held on December 27, 2012, when an agreement was struck between Berlitz and the union. Berlitz withdrew their high court lawsuit and new rules for collective bargaining were also established. They will again be conducted in English, after the language was changed to Japanese previously. Berlitz also promised to disclose more financial information to the union. The company also agreed to pay a base-up raise to current union members plus a lump sum bonus to the union.

== See also ==
- Maximilian Berlitz, the founder of Berlitz Corporation
