= ECC (eikaiwa) =

Private English teaching company in Japan

ECC 外語学院
- Company type: Kabushiki kaisha
- Industry: Language instruction
- Founded: Japan (1962)
- Headquarters: Kita Ward, Osaka, Japan
- Website: www.ecc.jp/ (in Japanese)

ECC Foreign Language Institute (ECC外語学院, -gaigo gakuin) is one of the major private English teaching companies or eikaiwa in Japan. It is part of the ECC group.

ECC (Education through Communication for the Community) is based in the Kansai region of Japan and also has many branches in the Chūbu and Kantō regions. As of March 2020 it has 188 Foreign Language Institute schools across Japan, as well as 24 Airline Institute schools and 12 Global Communication Senka locations. It has over 400 native English speakers as instructors.

In November 2013 it was reported that ECC had 379,267 students studying seven different languages: English, Chinese, French, German, Italian, Korean, and Spanish.

== Teaching staff ==
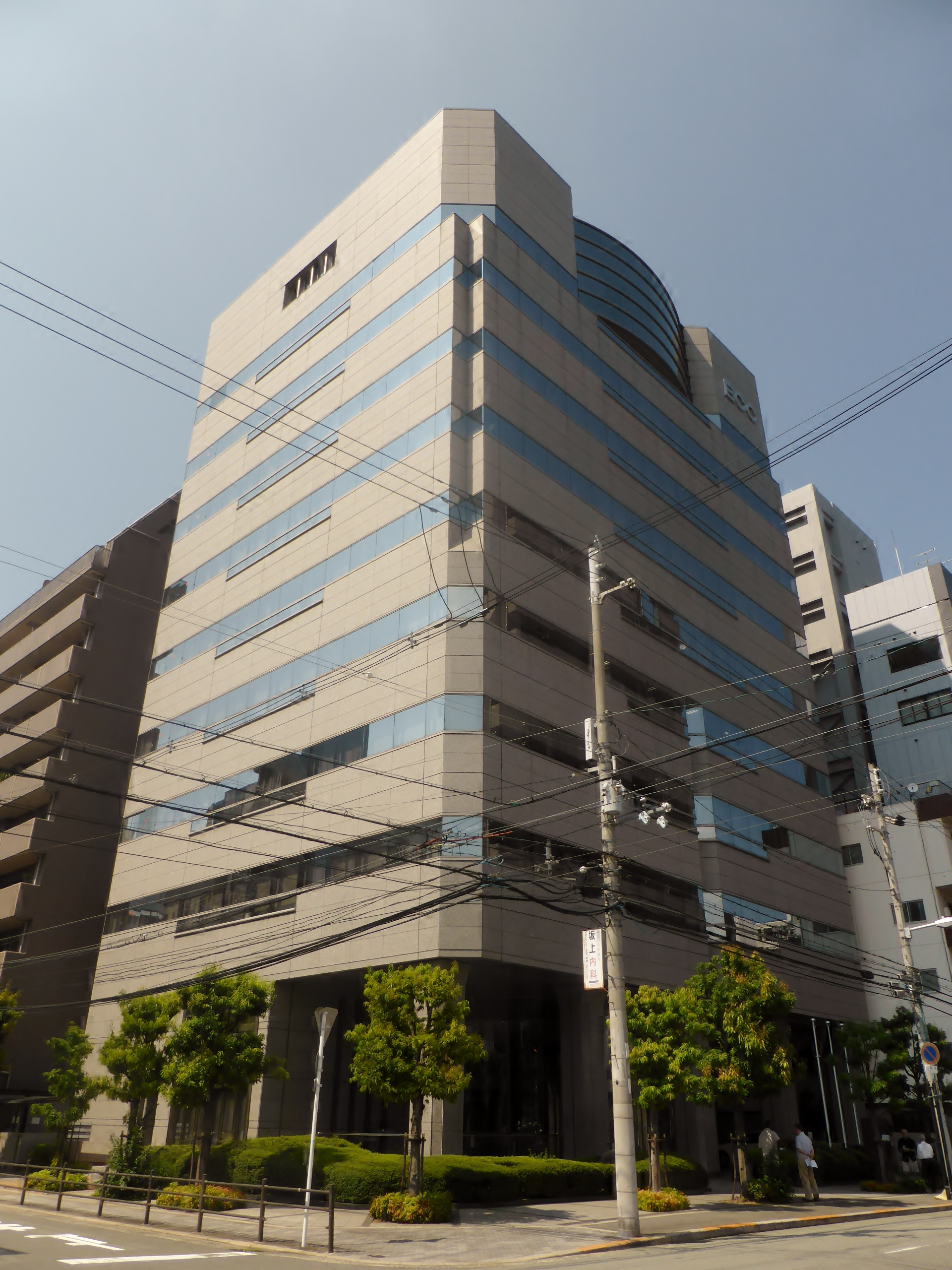
ECC Headquarters, Osaka

A large proportion of the foreign instructors employed at ECC are recruited abroad. A large number of these are recruited in Canada, where regular recruiting sessions are held. Periodic recruiting sessions are held in Australia, the US, the UK and more recently in New Zealand.

Half of the average teacher's weekly schedule is composed of English lessons for children, with the remainder of the schedule made up of different types of adult lessons. Some teachers are also chosen to teach at businesses and universities. ECC does have limited voluntary overtime, mainly during the peak holiday periods when attendance is high.

Newly hired teachers receive two weeks of training before being placed in classes, though more training is required for those chosen to teach more challenging types of classes. There is also annual training for those who continue past their first contract.

ECC foreign instructors are not required to be qualified English teachers, hold any EFL qualifications or have any previous teaching experience.

== School locations ==
As of February 2012, ECC has 171 schools located across Japan.

Kanto region; 62 schools: Tokyo prefecture; 32 schools. Kanagawa prefecture; 12 schools, Saitama prefecture; 8 schools, Chiba prefecture; 6 schools, Tochigi prefecture; 2 schools, Fukushima prefecture: 1 school, Ibaraki prefecture: 1 school.

Tokai region; 43 schools: Aichi prefecture; 34 schools, Mie prefecture; 3 schools, Gifu prefecture; 3 schools, Shizuoka prefecture; 3 schools.

Kansai region; 61 schools, Osaka prefecture; 27 schools, Hyogo prefecture; 15 schools, Kyoto prefecture; 8 schools, Nara prefecture; 7 schools, Shiga prefecture; 3 schools, Wakayama prefecture; 1 school.

Chugoku and Kyushu regions; 5 schools, Okayama prefecture; 1 school; Fukuoka prefecture; 2 schools, Hiroshima prefecture; 1 school, Miyazaki prefecture; 1 school

== Instructor employment system ==
- Full-time instructor
  - Instructors have a 5-day, 35-hour work week (both teaching/non-teaching hours included) schedule
  - One year contract
  - Base salary 271,500 yen per month
  - Approximately seven weeks of paid vacations per year:
    - One week in late April/early May
    - Two weeks in August
    - Two weeks in late December/early January
    - There are also at least five flexible days (ALPs) won by the ECC branch of the General Union.

== Language instruction ==
The ECC Foreign Language Institute offers a range of diverse courses ranging from 1.5 year- olds' "Mini Kids" classes to adults' lessons. ECC also operates ECC Junior, which has thousands of small franchises nationwide, the majority operated by housewives who teach English to children from pre-school to junior high school levels. They also send teachers to kindergartens and pre-schools. ECC is a member of the Japan Association for the Promotion of Foreign Language Education (全国外国語教育振興協会, zenkoku gaikokugo kyōiku shinkō kyōkai).

When Alles Toza Gaigo Gakuin English-language school closed in 1998, ECC was one of three language school chains to provide free lessons under certain conditions to former students in the Kansai region.

== Unions ==
There are several labor unions at ECC, including an in-house union that organizes certain categories of full-time staff members, and a branch of the General Union that organizes both foreign employees and some Japanese workers. The General Union belongs to the National Union of General Workers (NUGW), which is itself a member of the National Trade Union Council (Zenrokyo).

=== General Union ECC branch ===
==== Establishment and improvements gained ====
The GU branch of ECC was declared on February 26, 1996. Since then the union has made achievements including English pay slips, flexible paid holidays, unemployment insurance, health and pension insurance, a toll-free number for Kinki district sub-teachers, improved emergency evacuation procedures, a pre-consultation agreement to consult with the union before making changes that affect union members, and mandatory training is now conducted during working hours (or else paid at overtime rates).

==== Moves towards permanent employment ====
From April 2013 teachers have the right to become seishain (permanent employees). Two employees (office staff) were promoted to seishain in 2013.

==== Collective agreement over contract renewal ====
On July 29, 2013, the GU and ECC signed a collective agreement that GU members would always have their contracts renewed unless there were exceptional circumstances.
