= List of strikes in Japan =

Throughout Japanese history, a number of strikes, labour disputes, student strikes, hunger strikes, and other industrial actions have occurred.

== Background ==
A labour strike is a work stoppage caused by the mass refusal of employees to work. This can include wildcat strikes, which are done without union authorisation, and slowdown strikes, where workers reduce their productivity while still carrying out minimal working duties. It is usually a response to employee grievances, such as low pay or poor working conditions. Strikes can also occur to demonstrate solidarity with workers in other workplaces or pressure governments to change policies.

== 20th century ==
=== 1920s ===
- 1921 Mitsubishi-Kawasaki strike, in the port of Kobe.

=== 1930s ===
- Shunjuen Incident, in 1932.
- 1933 Singer Sewing strike, strike by sewing workers of the Singer Corporation.

=== 1940s ===
- Toho strikes, from 1946 to 1948.
- February 1 General Strike, in 1947.
- 1947–48 Kawasaki strike
- 1948 Hokkaido rail strikes

=== 1950s ===
- 1951 Mitsukoshi strike, strike by Mitsukoshi workers, the first strike by workers at a major department store in Japan.
- 1952 Japanese miners' strike

=== 1960s ===
- Miike Struggle, in 1960.
- 1968–1969 Japanese university protests

=== 1970s ===
- 1973 Japanese transit strike
- 1974 Japanese transit strike

== 21st century ==
=== 2000s ===
- 2004 Nippon Professional Baseball realignment
- 2007 US military bases in Japan strike, strike by Japanese workers at US military bases in Japan.
- 2007–2008 Berlitz Japan strike

=== 2020s ===
- 2023 Sogo & Seibu strike - strike at the flagship Seibu Department Store in Tokyo in protest over the store's sale to the American Fortress Investment Group, representing the first strike at a major department store in Japan in over 60 years;

== See also ==
- Labor unions in Japan
