= Himeji Dokkyo University =

Higher education institution in Hyōgo Prefecture, Japan

Coordinates: 34°52′20″N 134°41′22″E

- 姫路獨協大学
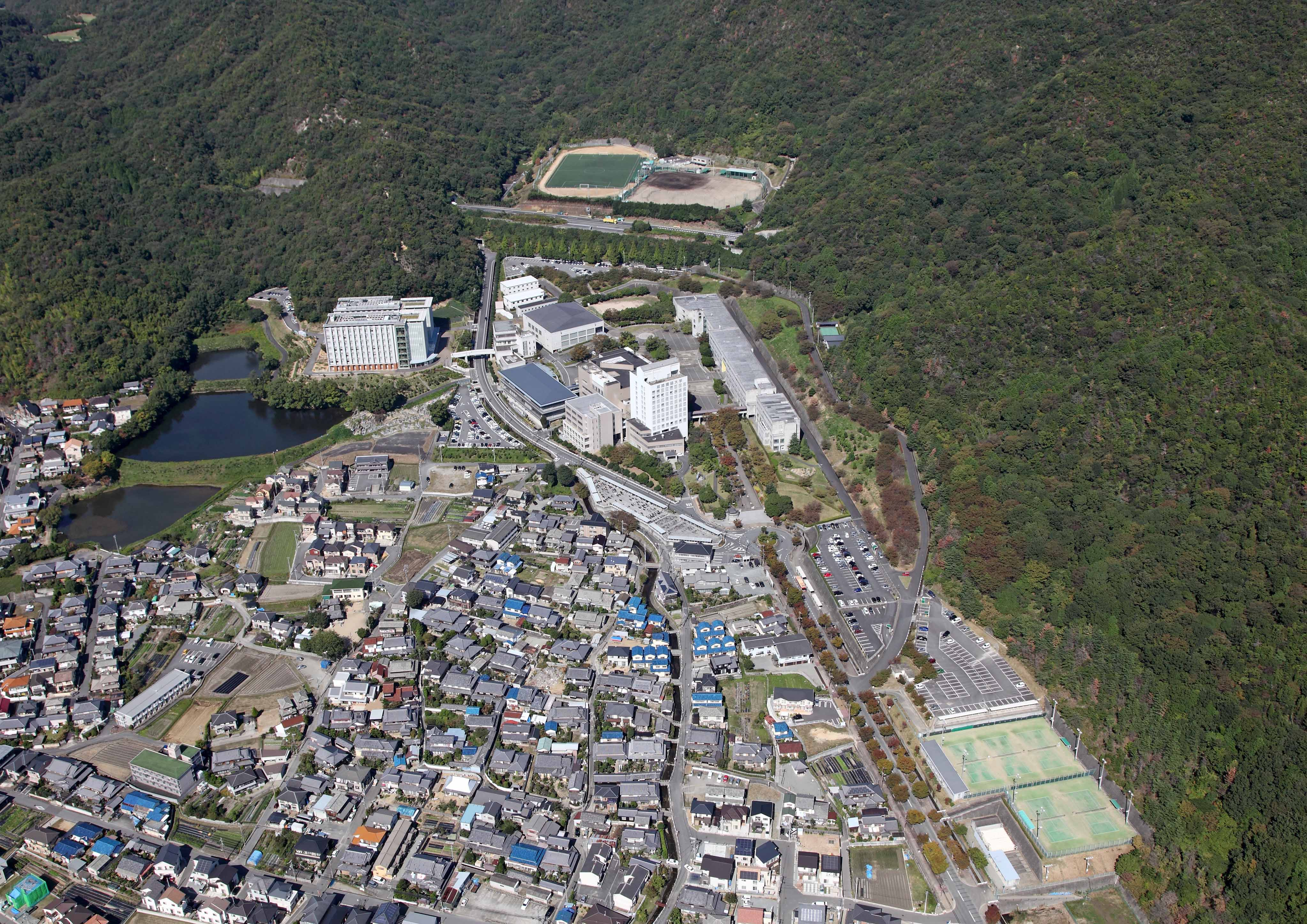
- Type: Private
- Established: 1881, chartered as a university in 1986
- Location: Himeji, Hyōgo, Japan
- Website: Official website

Himeji Dokkyo University (姫路獨協大学, Himeji dokkyō daigaku) is a private university in Himeji, Hyōgo, Japan. The predecessor of the school was founded in 1881, and it was chartered as a university in 1986. It has many international students relative to other Japanese universities, and is most known for the strength of its foreign studies program. It is a sister university of Dokkyo University in Tokyo.

== History ==
The first faculties were the Faculty of Foreign Languages, the Faculty of Law. In 1989, the faculty of Econo-informatics was founded, and in 2006 faculties of Medicine, Health and Physical Therapy were started. The Japanese foundation University Accreditation Association, according to a 2010 university evaluation and accreditation, has certified the university as being in conformity with Japanese university standards.

On May 26, 2010, the decision was taken to stop accepting new student applications to the graduate law school, which was opened in April 2006. No students passed the entrance exam.

In 2013, Himeji Dokkyo University was chosen as the partner site for the U.S. Department of State Critical Language Scholarship (CLS) Program. Approximately thirty students live in a Himeji business hotel and attend 20 hours of per week language instruction at the University for the summer.

== Unions ==
Some staff at Himeji Dokkyo University are represented by the General Union, a member of the National Union of General Workers (NUGW), which is itself a member of the National Trade Union Council (Zenrokyo).
