= Kansai Gaidai University =

University specializing in foreign languages in Hirakata, Osaka, Japan

Coordinates: 34.82325°N 135.66436°E

- 関西外国語大学
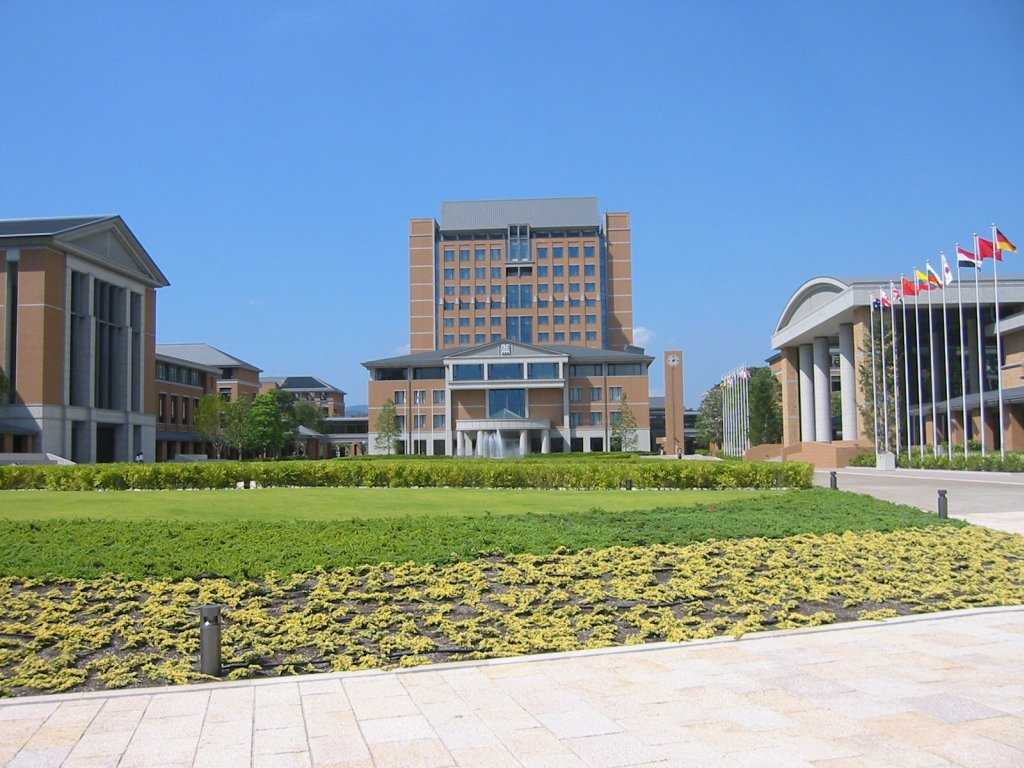
- Nakamiya campus
- Motto: "Go For it!"
- Type: Private
- Established: 1945
- Affiliations: 383 international institutions
- Officer in charge: Mark S. Tracy (executive director)
- President: Yoshitaka Tanimoto
- Dean: Masaaki Yamanashi
- Faculty: 773
- Students: 14,000
- Undergraduates: 13,200
- Postgraduates: 45
- Other students: 500 (A Semester in Asian Studies program)
- Location: Hirakata, Osaka, Japan
- Campus: Urban (two campuses)
- Website: kansaigaidai.ac.jp

Kansai Gaidai University (関西外国語大学, Kansai Gaikokugo Daigaku), almost always abbreviated Kansai Gaidai (関西外大), is located in Hirakata, Osaka, Japan. It is a private university focusing on foreign language studies. Kansai is the proper name of the large region where it is located, which includes the cities of Kyoto, Osaka and Kobe. Gaidai is a contraction of Gaikokugo Daigaku, which literally means "foreign language university". Gaidai is part of Kansai Science City.

Kansai Gaidai is known for its large Asian studies program for international exchange students as well as for its intensive English studies program for Japanese students planning to study abroad. There are currently two academic campuses: the Nakamiya campus (中宮キャンパス) and the Hotani campus (穂谷キャンパス). The original Katahoko campus (片鉾キャンパス) consisted of four dormitories and a gymnasium. Currently, there are about 15,000 students enrolled, including two-year and four-year students from across all regions of Japan. Students from dozens of countries are also present for the majority of the year.

== University background ==
Tanimoto English School, the forerunner of Kansai Gaidai University, was established in 1945. The original Katahoko campus was founded in 1966 as a University of Foreign Studies. Today, the Katahoko campus has been converted into a public park and a municipal library. In 1972, the Asian Studies Program was formally established. The Hotani Campus was established in 1984 and currently houses the Department of International Communication and a Confucius Institute. The Nakamiya campus opened in April 2002, and now operates as the main campus of the university. In 2018, the Gakkentoshi campus moved to nearby Gotenyama, within walking distance of the main Nakamiya campus. Gotenyama Campus - Global Town officially opened on April 1, 2018 and had a dedication ceremony on June 9, 2018. New seminar houses are being planned as well to host both international and Japanese students alike. The university is also known for the collaborative effort in the formulation of the Genki Series, books used by dozens of schools to teach Japanese. Several Kansai Gaidai teachers contributed to its teaching methodology and publication.

== Asian Studies Program ==
The Asian Studies Program is located in the Center for International Education at the Nakamiya Campus. An integral part of the program is the Speaking Partners Program which pairs incoming foreign exchange students with a local Kansai Gaidai student who helps with the adjustment of living in Japan. KGU itself sends about 1,500 students abroad every year to study abroad all over the globe.

Another part of the exchange program is the home stay program which places a limited number of students with local families to provide an immersive Japanese cultural and societal experience. For those students who were unable to get a spot in the home stay program, the school offers a home visit program which pairs a foreign exchange student with a family so that the student may visit them and participate in families activities usually weekly or as determined by the student and the family.

Accommodation for foreign exchange students are located in the Seminar Houses.

== Unions ==
Some staff at Kansai Gaidai University are represented by the General Union, a member of the National Union of General Workers (NUGW), which is itself a member of the National Trade Union Council (Zenrokyo).

== Notable alumni ==
- Jero (class of 2002) - enka and hip-hop singer
- Masaaki Satake- seidokaikan karate and K-1 fighter
- Takayuki Yasuda - basketball head coach
