= Credit Suisse Securities Japan Limited income tax case =

The Credit Suisse Securities Japan Limited “Mass Understatement of Income Tax” Case is a lawsuit pertaining to employees and former employees of Credit Suisse Securities.

== Incident ==
It started in November 2008, when 300 of employees and former employees of Credit Suisse Securities were summoned from the competent tax office simultaneously. They were all front-office employees whose salary was renewed every year, and who received shares of CSG including company restricted stock (called “phantom shares” which they cannot liquidate for certain period) and employee stock options as compensation in the accounts that each of them opened at the affiliated company of CSG in US. This compensation plan was complicated, and the income taxes due in Japan had not been withheld.

Most of the employees and former employees understated tax reporting of the stock-based compensation and roughly 100 of them completely failed to declare their stock-based compensation.

At the same time employees of CS Securities and other foreign investment banks such as JP Morgan Chase were investigated and hundreds of individuals were exposed as understating income tax.

Among hundreds of cases only one person, Takashi “Terry” Hatta from CS Securities, was accused by the Taxation Bureau and prosecuted.

Tokyo Regional Taxation Bureau initiated the investigation into Hatta in December 2008, and a year later they made an accusation. This accusation was taken up by the Tokyo District Public Prosecutors. After a year and nine months the Special Investigation Team started voluntary questioning of the defendant; the questioning took three months. These processes took three years, an exceptionally a long stretch for an investigation of tax evasion. Hatta kept claiming his innocence, claiming that he did not file taxes because he believed that income tax from the stock-based compensation had already been withheld by the firm, which is usually the case for cash compensation: he never intended to evade taxes. Unusually, the Special Investigation Team indicted him without arrest.

== Trials ==
The first trial of Tokyo District Court was held on Feb 22, 2012. At district court level, 11 trials were held through March 1, 2013 when Tokyo District Court declared them not guilty, accepting the defendant's claim that he never intended to evade tax. The instance of not guilty for Taxation Bureau and the Public Prosecutors was the first case in Japanese history.

The Public Prosecutors appealed to Tokyo High Court immediately.

The first trial of Tokyo High Court was held on November 15, 2013.

On Jan 31, 2014, Tokyo High Court dismissed the appeal.

On Feb 14, 2014, the government accepted defeat and Hatta was released.

Hatta sued the country claiming 500MM yen. The first trial of the State Redress was held on Jul 28, 2014.

== Articles ==
Several journalists wrote articles defending Hatta in magazines and internet media, such as Shoko Egawa, Chikaki Tanaka and Osamu Aoki.

== Books ==
- Chikaki Tanaka Tax Reporter – Real Life of the Inspection Team of Taxation Bureau (Japanese)” (introducing Credit Suisse Securities Japan Limited “Mass Understatement of Income Tax” Case)
- Takashi “Terry” Hatta Challenge for Zero Probability – How Was the Historic Decision of Not-Guilty Brought (Japanese)(published May 16, 2014)
