= American Club =

American Club may refer to:

- American Club (eikaiwa), an English school in Tochigi Prefecture, Japan
- American Club (Kohler, Wisconsin), a resort
- American Club, London, a former gentlemen's club, founded in 1918
- American Club, Shangai
- American Club Hong Kong, an elite club with locations in Victoria City on Hong Kong Island and in Tai Tam
- Tokyo American Club, a social club for expats in Tokyo
