= Epion =

English conversation school in Japan

Coordinates: 34.817933°N 135.575277°E

- Industry: Language instruction
- Headquarters: Osaka, Japan
- Website: epion.mabuchi.co.jp/english/index.html

Epion (エピオン, epion) is a private eikaiwa English conversation school owned by the Mabuchi Education Group, a juku chain in Japan. Epion's students are largely pre-school aged-children through to teenagers. Many of them later go on to study at the Mabuchi jukus. It has 17 schools, 2,500 students and 35 foreign teaching staff.

== General Union branch ==
Some teachers at Epion are represented by the Osaka-based General Union.
