= Louis Carlet =

American labor leader

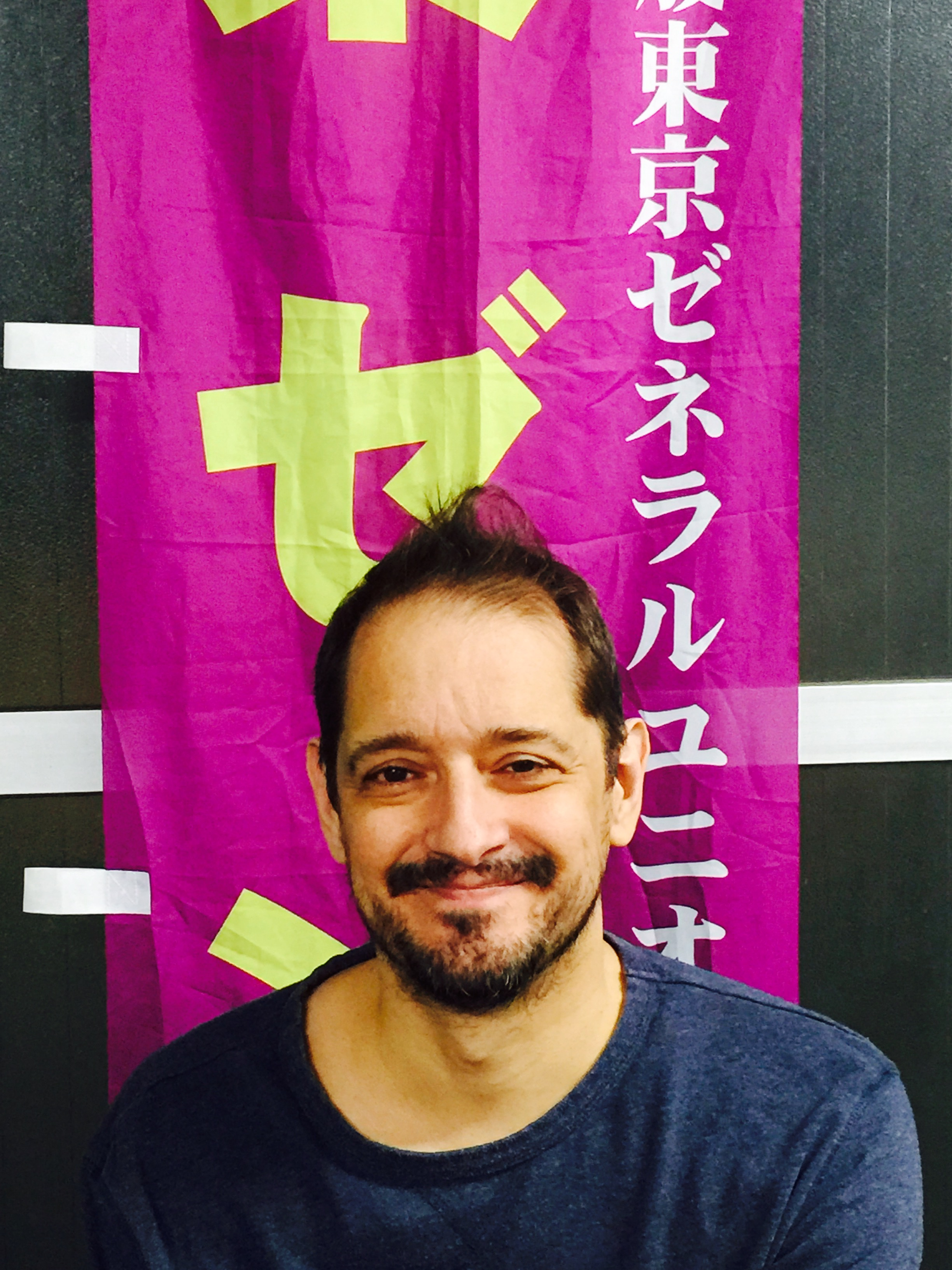
Tozen Union founder Louis Carlet.

Louis Carlet is an American labor leader resident in Japan, and the founder of Tozen, a union representing both Japanese and migrant workers, including foreign language teachers, bank and newspaper workers.

== Early years in Japan ==
Carlet is from the United States and moved to Japan in the early 1990s, originally working as a translator for a Japanese newspaper, called Nihon Keizai Shimbun, and subsequently leaving that position to become a full-time paid trade union organizer, the first foreigner to hold such a position ever in Japan. He has acted as an adviser to English instructors and others with work-related problems through the Japan Times.

== Labor organization ==
=== March in March ===
In 2005, Carlet organized the "March in March" to raise awareness for job security and inequality of foreign workers in Japan. Zentoitsu's Ippei Torii had begun "foreigner spring labor offensive" in the mid-1990s, which included demonstrations and marches. Building on that tradition, Carlet spearheaded and organized a "Job Security March" in Shibuya in 2005. The march called for job security and equality for foreigners. The following year, 2006, he changed the name to "March in March. The new branding helped raise the profile of the protest march, which became known for music, performances, enormous "mushiro-bata" tatami mat signs, and a festive parade atmosphere. He was successful in gaining media coverage. The march has taken place the second Sunday each March since 2006 but was cancelled in 2010 and 2011 due to heavy rain and the Great East Japan earthquake respectively. It was held again in 2012 but with far less foreign leadership.

=== Teacher's strikes ===
In autumn of 2007, he case officered Nova Union of Students and Teachers' efforts to recover unpaid wages from eikaiwa giant Nova Corp. That company eventually collapsed and Carlet gave several press conferences to national TV as well as to the Foreign Correspondents Club Japan.

=== Berlitz legal case ===
From Dec. 13, 2007 until the following December, he case officered and helped lead a strike by over 100 Berlitz teachers for a COLA raise of 4.6%. He also penned a piece describing the strike for the Japan Times. This essay was later used by Berlitz to try to demonstrate that the intent of the strike was to hurt the company not to win union demands. On Dec. 3, 2008, he was sued along with six other union executives for allegedly leading and organizing an illegal strike by Berlitz Japan. Berlitz Japan 2007–2008 Strike. The union also sued the company on several counts of violations of Trade Union Law in the Tokyo Labor Commission. The fight dragged on for several years. During the years of the dispute, Berlitz fired several union officials, including Canadian activist Catherine Campbell.

In Feb. 2012, Tokyo District Court dismissed all claims by the language company against him and the other executives. Berlitz Japan appealed to Tokyo High Court, and Carlet led negotiations toward a settlement, which was reached in December 2012. The settlement was featured in the New Year's Day edition of the Japan Times. He later spearheaded a drive to force Berlitz Japan to pay teachers for work done during the five-minute break between classes, involving Begunto President Paul Kennedy.

=== Tozen ===
In April 2010, he led a massive defection of most foreign and some Japanese members from NUGW Tokyo Nambu to found Zenkoku Ippan Tokyo General Union ("Tozen Union"). This union is registered with the Tokyo Labor Commission as well as with the Justice Bureau. It was the first ever amalgamated union in Japan led by foreigners. It has grown since founding from six to twenty local unions as of March 2016.

== Media and publications ==
Carlet was interviewed by DemocracyNow! about the Great East Japan earthquake on March 11, 2011. In that interview he claimed Tozen was the "largest multinational union in Japan."

In 2012, he published his first novel, Manna and the Millennium.

In March 2014, he interpreted for Noam Chomsky when that intellectual met with Tozen leaders for a chat.
