= Unfair labor practice (Japan) =

Acts committed by an employer that violate the right of workers to organize

An unfair labor practice (不当労働行為, futouroudoukoui) is discrimination by an employer in Japan against a worker who is associated with a union, or refusal by an employer to negotiate with a trade union, or interference in the activities of a union. Unfair labor practices are defined under Article 7 of the 1949 Trade Union Law (労働組合法, roudou-kumiaihou). They are ruled on by Labour Relations Commissions.

== Trade Union Act Article 7 ==
The employer shall not commit the acts listed in any of the following items:

(i) to discharge or otherwise treat in a disadvantageous manner a worker by reason of such worker's being a member of a labor union, having tried to join or organize a labor union, or having performed justifiable acts of a labor union; or to make it a condition of employment that the worker shall not join or shall withdraw from a labor union. However, where a labor union represents a majority of workers employed at a particular factory or workplace, this shall not preclude an employer from concluding a collective agreement which requires, as a condition of employment, that the workers shall be members of such labor union;

(ii) to refuse to bargain collectively with the representatives of the workers employed by the employer without justifiable reasons;

(iii) to control or interfere with the formation or management of a labor union by workers or to give financial assistance in defraying the labor union's operational expenditures, provided, however, that this shall not preclude the employer from permitting workers to confer or negotiate with the employer during working hours without loss of time or wage, and this shall not apply to the employer's contributions for public welfare funds or welfare and other funds which are actually used for payments to prevent or relieve economic adversity or misfortunes, nor to the giving office of minimum space;

(iv) to discharge or otherwise treat in a disadvantageous manner a worker for such worker's having filed a motion with the Labor Relations Commission that the employer has violated the provisions of this Article; for such worker's having requested the Central Labor Relations Commission to review an order issued under the provisions of Article 27–12, paragraph 1; or for such worker's having presented evidence or having spoken at an investigation or hearing conducted by the Labor Relations Commission in regard to such a motion, or in connection with a recommendation of a settlement to those concerned, or at an adjustment of labor disputes as provided for under the Labor Relations Adjustment Act (Act No. 25 of 1946).

== Examples ==
In response to a case bought by the Japan Airlines Cabin Crew Union on November 4, 2009, the Tokyo Labor Commission ruled that wage and employment discrimination against union members was an unfair labor practice. It ordered JAL to apologize and end the discrimination.

In response to a case brought by the General Union against the Assistant Language Teacher staffing company Interac for failing to hold collective bargaining with the union, on July 26, 2010, the Osaka Labor Commission ruled that Interac had committed an unfair labor practice by refusing to hold collective bargaining with the union. As a result, Interac was ordered to hand-deliver an apology to the union, and banned from bidding on government projects. Interac then appealed this ruling to the Central Labor Commission in Tokyo, where a settlement was brokered.

Seventeen convenience store owners of FamilyMart stores who had formed a union and requested collective bargaining with the company and were refused sued. In April 2015 the Central Labor Commission found that FamilyMart had violated the Trade Union law by refusing to negotiate with the union. The franchise owners and were recognised as employees under the trade union law, and the company was ordered to pledge to the union that it would not to repeat the offence.
