= ITTTi =

iTTTi Japan
- Company type: Kabushiki kaisha
- Industry: Language instruction
- Founded: August 1989
- Headquarters: Nagoya, Japan
- Key people: Eiichi Tanaka 田中 榮一 (Representative director)
- Website: www.ittti.co.jp

iTTTi Japan (イッティージャパン株式会社, iti japan kubushikigaisha) is a Japanese operator of eikaiwa (English conversation schools).

== Peppy Kids Club ==
Peppy Kids Club, run by iTTTi Japan for children from 2.5 years old to high-school aged. As of 2012, Peppy Kids Club has over 1150 locations all around Japan, with 95,000 students. As of February 2011 it had 1627 Japanese and 421 foreign staff.

== Branches outside Japan ==
The company iTTTi also has operations outside Japan: iTTTi Vancouver, iTTTi Toronto, iTTTi Brisbane, and iTTTi Los Angeles.
