= American Club (eikaiwa) =

- Company type: Kabushiki kaisha
- Industry: Language instruction, other
- Founded: Utsunomiya, Tochigi, Japan (July 15, 1986)
- Headquarters: Utsunomiya, Tochigi, Japan
- Key people: Yasuki Yamauchi (山内泰樹Yamauchi Yasuki) current President

American Club (アメリカンクラブ株式会社) is a company based in the Hiramatsuhonchō (平松本町) district of Utsunomiya, Tochigi, Japan which has been involved in the "eikaiwa" (English conversation) business.

Though the company primarily operated as an English school in the 1980s and '90s, according to its business registration it is also involved in numerous other business activities such as restaurants and bars, athletic clubs, hotels, printing/publishing, video and software rental and employment services.

== Early history ==
The American Club began operating on July 15, 1986, and recruited students for English classes during the Japanese asset price bubble economy of the late 1980s and early 1990s. The classes were mainly taught by native English-speaking teachers from the U.S., Canada, Great Britain, Australia and New Zealand. At its peak, it had a main school in Utsunomiya, and six branch schools in Mibu, Mooka, Oyama, Tochigi City (all in Tochigi Prefecture), Koga (in Ibaraki Prefecture) and Sendai (in Miyagi Prefecture).

== Financial problems and first lawsuit over unpaid wages ==
After the burst of Japan's bubble economy in the early 1990s, the American Club began to suffer. In summer 1994, employees' wages were late. By October of that year, the school had stopped paying wages at all. A group of employees, led by Don MacLaren, subsequently organized, formed a branch union through Japan's National Union of General Workers and took the company's president, Hiroaki (a.k.a. "Morio") Sugimoto, and director, Isao (a.k.a. "Yasuaki") Konno, to court. These employees received three months in back wages on December 26, 1994, with a stipulation insisted on by Sugimoto that "teachers will refrain from damaging the company's reputation".

Though the school had serious problems making its payroll between 1994 and 1996, it continued to recruit and hire new employees (both before the December 1994 lawsuit and after it) from overseas through a broker in Vancouver, Canada, as well as from within Japan, through The Japan Times "help wanted" ads. Many of The Japan Times' ads were for positions at an affiliated school Sugimoto ran - International Business and Language Senmon Gakkou (a.k.a. IBL, which according to its business registration is, like American Club, still a legally functioning entity).

Sugimoto was the landlord of the American Club spaces in Utsunomiya, and collected rent from the American Club through another company he owns, Mimasu Shoji, when the schools' teachers and secretaries were not being paid.

By December 1995 the school was again three months late paying employees' wages. By this time Sugimoto had legally resigned his position as president of the company, and Konno became its president. However, on the business registrations for the Oyama and Mooka schools, Sugimoto's name was the only one listed as being responsible for the school.

After the 1996 New Year's holidays, Konno fled. In a letter to an American Club employee he claimed Sugimoto had threatened him and his (Konno's) wife with harassment from sound trucks operated by right wing organizations if Konno tried to declare bankruptcy for the American Club. In the letter Konno explained that because Sugimoto relied on the financial solvency of the American Club in order to obtain business loans, he (Sugimoto) could not afford to have the American Club be declared bankrupt by its own president.

After this, Yasuki Yamauchi of Fukuoka City, more than 1,000 kilometers from Utsunomiya, assumed legal responsibility for the school. According to a January 25, 1996, article on the American Club in the Asahi Shimbun, a reporter from the newspaper made a call to the company's phone number in Fukuoka, but the person who answered the phone hung up on the reporter. None of the teachers met Yamauchi, and with no one coming forward to take charge of the company, the teachers eventually stopped working for it. However, after the American Club stopped holding English classes in 1996, Sugimoto continued to run IBL (which was government-supported).

== Second lawsuit over unpaid wages ==
A second lawsuit was filed by employees for three months in unpaid wages in January 1996, but none of the company's directors showed up in court and they ignored the subsequent court order to pay. Eventually the employees received 80% of their back wages through the Labor Standards Office of the Japanese government.

With no income received after three months, many teachers returned to their home countries. The total amount of delinquent wages owed all employees during the lawsuits totaled the equivalent of more than US$100,000. Also, students, who had paid in advance for as much as a year's worth of classes, lost an undetermined amount of money. In addition, rent on the company's spaces in branch schools, as well as rent on the teachers’ apartments (which had been deducted by the company from teachers’ pay) was as much as a year in arrears by the time of the second lawsuit.

== News reports ==
During the course of the second lawsuit, in January 1996, articles were run in the local edition of Japanese language newspapers: The Asahi Shimbun and the Shimotsuke Shinbun. Articles were also run by a local English language newspaper: Networking (now defunct). The Networking articles outlined the root causes of the lawsuits (specifically the events leading up to the first lawsuit) and focused on the immigrant employees involved. Later, several letters and essays MacLaren wrote were published in journals such as BusinessWeek and The Japan Times. MacLaren also provided The Japan Times with a list of organizations he had contacted in order to help resolve the pay problems, which the newspaper subsequently published on numerous occasions.

== Current status ==
Though published news reports indicated the American Club was closed, and its directors ignored a court summons and subsequent court order to pay wages in the second lawsuit, its business registration indicates the company is still a legally operating entity, with 30 million yen in equity.

The business registration indicates that the Shimotsuke Shinbun, a newspaper that ran stories on the lawsuits, advertises American Club's services in its pages.
