= Labor unions in Japan =

- National organization(s): Japanese Trade Union Confederation (Rengo) National Confederation of Trade Unions (Zenroren); National Trade Union Council (Zenrokyo) Others
- Regulatory authority: Ministry of Health, Labour and Welfare
- Primary legislation: Labour Union Law (Act. No. 51, Dec 1945) Labour Relations Adjustment Law (1946); Labour Standards Law (1947); Labour Union Law (Act. No. 174, June 1949) Labour Contract Law (2007)
- Total union membership: 10,238,187
- Percentage of workforce unionized: 16.3% (2023)

International Labour Organization
- Japan is a member of the ILO

Convention ratification
- Freedom of Association: 14 June 1965
- Right to Organise: 20 October 1953

Labour unions emerged in Japan in the second half of the Meiji period, after 1890, as the country underwent a period of rapid industrialization. Until 1945, however, the labour movement remained weak, impeded by a lack of legal rights, anti-union legislation, management-organized factory councils, and political divisions between “cooperative” and radical unionists.

In the immediate aftermath of the Second World War, the U.S. Occupation authorities initially encouraged the formation of independent unions, but reversed course as part of broader anti-Communist measures. The legislation was passed that enshrined the right to organize, and membership rapidly rose to 5 million by February 1947. The organization rate peaked at 55.8% in 1949 and subsequently declined to 16.3% as of 2023.

The labour movement went through a process of reorganization from 1987 to 1991 from which emerged the present configuration of three major labour union federations, along with other smaller national union organizations.

== National labor union federations ==
In 2005, 43,096 labour unions in Japan, with a combined membership of 7,395,666 workers, belonged either directly, or indirectly through labour union councils, to the three main labour union federations:

- Rengo: Japanese Trade Union Confederation (日本労働組合総連合会 Nihon Rōdōkumiai Sōrengō-kai) 33,940 unions, 6,507,222 members
- Zenroren: National Confederation of Trade Unions (全国労働組合総連合 Zenkoku Rōdōkumiai Sōrengō) 7,531 unions, 730,102 members
- Zenrokyo: National Trade Union Council (全国労働組合連絡協議会 Zenkoku Rōdōkumiai Renraku Kyōgi-kai) 1,625 unions, 158,342 members

A further 19,139 unions, with a combined membership of 2,842,521 workers, were affiliated to other national labour organizations. The labour union organizations included (with membership figures for 2001/2002) the National Federation of Construction Workers' Unions (717,908) Federation of City Bank Employees' Unions (105,950), Zendenko Roren (53,853), National Federation of Agricultural Mutual Aid Societies Employees' Unions (45,830), All Japan Council of Optical Industry Workers' Union (44,776), National Teachers Federation of Japan (42,000), Faculty and Staff Union of Japanese Universities (38,500), and All Aluminium Industrial Workers Union (36,000).

== History ==
=== Meiji period to 1945 ===
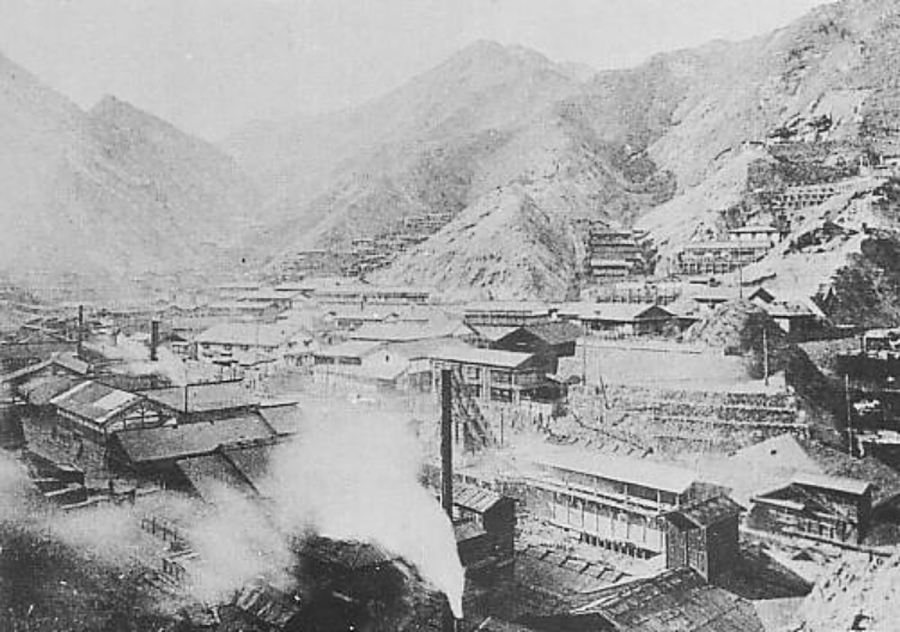
The Ashio copper mine (c1895). A three-day riot in 1907 at the Furukawa Company's massive mine was violently suppressed by troops.

In the first half of the Meiji period (1868–1912), most labour disputes occurred in the mining and textile industries and took the form of small-scale strikes and spontaneous riots. The second half of the period witnessed rapid industrialization, the development of a capitalist economy, and the transformation of many feudal workers to wage labour. The use of strike action increased, and 1897, with the establishment of a union for metalworkers, saw the beginnings of the modern Japanese trade-union movement.

In February 1898, engineers and stokers at the Japan Railway Company successfully struck for improvement of status and higher wages. In the same year, ships' carpenters in Tokyo and Yokohama formed a union, and a dispute followed with demands for higher wages.

1907 saw the greatest number of disputes in a decade, with large-scale riots at Japan's two leading copper mines, Ashio and Besshi, which were only suppressed by the use of troops. None of these early unions were large (the metalworkers union had 3,000 members, only 5% of workers employed in the industry), or lasted longer than three or four years, largely due to strong opposition from employers and the government's anti-union policies, notably the Public Order and Police Provisions Law (1900).

One labour organization that did survive was the Friendly Society (Yuaikai), formed in 1912 by Bunji Suzuki, which became Japan's first durable union and was renamed the Japan Federation of Labour (Nihon Rōdō Sodomei or Sōdōmei) in 1921. Two years later it had a membership of 100,000 in 300 unions. From 1918 to 1921, a wave of major industrial disputes marked the peak of organized labour power. A prolonged economic slump that followed brought cutbacks in employment in heavy industry. In the early 1920s, ultra-cooperative unionists proposed the fusion of labour and management interests, heightening political divisions within the labour movement and precipitating the departure of left wing unions from Sōdōmei in 1925. The union movement has remained divided between right wing (“cooperative”) unions and left wing unions ever since.

After the First World War, there were many attempts to establish a trade union law to protect the rights of workers to organize themselves, including a Department of Home Affairs bill in 1925, which would have prevented employers from discharging workers for belonging to a union, or requiring workers to quit (or not join) a union. But these bills never became law.

Hampered by their weak legal status, the absence of a right to bargain collectively with employers, and the setting up of management-organized factory councils, over 800 unions had succeeded in organizing only 7.9% of the labour force by 1931. Of these unions, the majority were organized along industrial or craft lines, with about one-third organized on an enterprise basis. 5% of unionized workers were members of the anarchist union federations Zenkoku Jiren and Nihon Jikyō.

In 1940, the government dissolved the existing unions and absorbed them into the Industrial Association for Serving the Nation (Sangyo Hokokukai or Sampō), the government-sponsored workers' organization, as part of a national reorganization of all civil organizations under central government direction and as a means of controlling radical elements in the workforce. Nonetheless, employees could still bargain and gain welfare benefits on a local level. Sampō remained in existence at the end of the war.

=== 1945 to the present ===
After the Japanese surrender on 15 August 1945, allied forces, mostly American, rapidly began arriving in Japan. Almost immediately, the occupiers began an intensive program of legal changes designed to democratize Japan. One action was to ensure the creation of a Trade Union Law to allow for the first time workers to organize, strike, and bargain collectively, which was passed by the Diet of Japan on 22 December 1945.

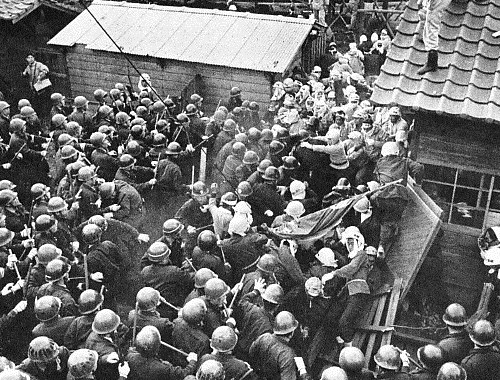
The 1960 Miike struggle: police with helmets and batons clash with striking coal miners at the Miike coal mine, May 12, 1960

While the law was created while Japan was under occupation, the law itself was largely a Japanese work. It was put together by a large legal advisory commission headed by the legal scholar Suehiro Izutaro. The commission was quite large, consisting of "three Welfare ministry bureaucrats and two scholars, a steering committee of 30 members (including the communist firebrand Kyuichi Tokuda), and an overall membership of more than 130 members representing universities, corporations, political parties, the bureaucracy, social workers, and labor."

In addition to the Trade Union Act of 1945, the postwar constitution of Japan, which became law on 3 May 1947 includes article 28, which guarantees the right of workers to participate in a trade union.

On 1 June 1949, a new version of the Trade Union Law was enacted. It has since been amended in 1950, 1951, 1952, 1954, 1959, 1962, 1966, 1971, 1978, 1980, 1983, 1984, 1988, 1993, 1999, 2002, 2004, and 2005.

By 1960, Japan's labor unions were at the height of their power, and served as the backbone of the massive 1960 Anpo protests against revision of the U.S.-Japan Security Treaty. However, that same year, the Japanese labor movement suffered a devastating defeat in the climactic Miike Coal Mine strike at the Mitsui Miike Coal Mine in Kyushu, marking the high-water mark of labor militancy in Japan.

Until the mid-1980s, Japan's 74,500 trade unions were represented by four main labor federations: the General Council of Trade Unions of Japan (日本労働組合総評議会 nihon rōdō kumiai sōhyōgikai, commonly known as Sōhyō), with 4.4 million members—a substantial percentage representing public sector employees; the Japan Confederation of Labour (zen nihon rodo sodomei, commonly known as Dōmei), with 2.2 million members; the Association of Neutral Labour Unions (ja:中立労連 Chūritsu Rōren), with 1.6 million members; and the National Federation of Industrial Organizations (ja:新産別 Shinsanbetsu), with only 61,000 members.

In 1987 Dōmei and Chūritsu Rōren were dissolved and amalgamated into the newly established Japanese Trade Union Confederation (連合 RENGO), and in 1990 Sōhyō affiliates merged with Rengo.

== Membership ==
The rate of labor union membership declined considerably after its postwar high to 16.3% as of 2023. The continuing long-term reduction in union membership was caused by several factors, including the restructuring of Japanese industry away from heavy industries. Many people entering the workforce in the 1980s joined smaller companies in the tertiary sector, where there was a general disinclination toward joining labor organizations.

Any regular employee below the rank of section chief is eligible to become a union officer. Management, however, often pressures the workers to select favored employees. Officers usually maintain their seniority and tenure while working exclusively on union activities and while being paid from the union's accounts, and union offices are often located at the factory site. Many union officers go on to higher positions within the corporation if they are particularly effective, but few become active in organized labor activities at the national level.

The relationship between the typical labor union and the company is unusually close. Both white- and blue-collar workers join the union automatically in most major companies. Temporary and subcontracting workers are excluded, and managers with the rank of section manager and above are considered part of management. In most corporations, however, many of the managerial staff are former union members. In general, Japanese unions are sensitive to the economic health of the company, and company management usually briefs the union membership on the state of corporate affairs.

== Negotiations and actions ==
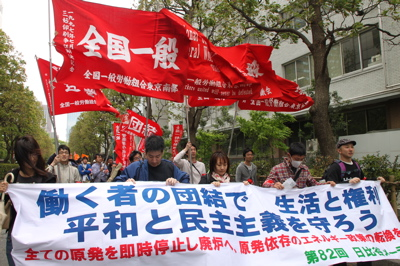
2011 National Trade Union Council (Zenrokyo) May Day march, Tokyo.

Local labor unions and work unit unions, rather than the federations, conducted the major collective bargaining. Unit unions often banded together for wage negotiations, but federations did not control their policies or actions. Federations also engaged in political and public relations activities.

During prosperous times, the spring labor offensives are highly ritualized affairs, with banners, sloganeering, and dances aimed more at being a show of force than a crippling job action. Meanwhile, serious discussions take place between the union officers and corporate managers to determine pay and benefit adjustments.

During downturns, or when management tries to reduce the number of permanent employees, strikes often occur. The number of working days lost to labor disputes peaked in the economic turmoil of 1974 and 1975 at around 9 million workdays in the two-year period. In 1979, however, there were fewer than 1 million days lost. Since 1981 the average number of days lost per worker each year to disputes was just over 9% of the number lost in the United States.

After 1975, when the economy entered a period of slower growth, annual wage increases moderated and labor relations were conciliatory. During the 1980s, workers received pay hikes that on average closely reflected the real growth of GNP for the preceding year. In 1989, for example, workers received an average 5.1% pay hike, while GNP growth had averaged 5% between 1987 and 1989. The moderate trend continued in the early 1990s as the country's national labor federations were reorganizing themselves.

== Unions ==
=== Extant ===
- National Trade Union Council (Zenrokyo)
- Japanese Trade Union Confederation (Rengo)
- National Confederation of Trade Unions (Zenroren)
- National Union of General Workers
- General Union
- Kyabakura Union
- Japan Teachers' Union (Nikkyoso)
- University Teachers Union
- Zenkoku Ippan Tokyo General Union (Tozen)

=== Formerly extant ===
- Sanbetsu
- Sōhyō

== See also ==
=== Workplace ===
- Japanese employment law
- Japanese work environment
- Black company (Japanese term)

=== Workers ===
- Japanese blue collar workers
- Salaryman, Japanese white collar worker
- Office lady

=== Labor actions ===
- Anpo protests
- Miike Struggle
