= Link Interac Inc. =

Coordinates: 35.6697°N 139.7678°E

- Company type: Corporation
- Industry: Education
- Founded: September 1972
- Headquarters: Tokyo, Japan
- Number of locations: 13 regional offices in Japan
- Services: Education, Consultation, Publishing, Language Testing
- Website: http://www.interacnetwork.com

Link Interac Inc. is a Japanese company founded in 1972 which focuses to providing Assistant Language Teachers (ALTs) to public elementary, middle, and high schools in Japan.

From 2010 to 2014, Interac was owned by Advantage Partners. Since April 2014, Interac has become part of Link & Motivation Inc (TSE:2170) and its name was changed to Link Interac Inc.

== Etymology ==
The name is an acronym for International Education Research and Analysis Corporation, although the company has never operated under that name.

== Description and history ==
Interac is Japan’s largest private provider of professional foreign teachers to the Japanese government through its ALT program. As one of the largest non-government employers of foreign nationals in Japan they employ nearly 3,500 staff in Japan across a network of 13 offices. Around 3,200 of these employees are non-Japanese.

Interac began as a provider of corporate educational services but from the mid-nineties began providing ALTs and education-related services to Boards of Education across Japan.

The company has fifteen domestic branches within Japan, with associated offices in Salt Lake City and Oxford. There are approximately 100 administrative staff, and a teaching team of over 2,500 ALTs and language teachers for English and other languages.

== Clients ==
Link Interac has fifteen branches servicing over 7000 different client organizations. Mostly these are local boards of education to whom Interac provides ALTs. The scope of this teaching in public schools is quite large, and the estimate based on government figures is that about 17.33%, or 1 in 5.76 students, is taught by an Interac teacher weekly. About 10% of its business is in providing language instruction to companies such as Ito-Yokado, Honda, Hitachi, Mitsubishi, and NEC, as well as Japanese governmental organizations such as the Japan International Cooperation Agency.

== Union representation ==
In western Japan some Interac teachers are represented by the General Union. In southern Japan Interac teachers are represented by the Fukuoka General Union. In the Tokyo area and north eastern Japan, Interac teachers are unionized in "Zenkoku Ippan Tokyo General Union Tozen ALTs" local.

== See also ==
- Education in Japan
- JET Programme
