= Shimotsuke Shimbun =

Shimotsuke Shimbun (Japanese: 下野新聞) is a newspaper based in Utsunomiya, Tochigi Prefecture, Japan. According to its website it was established in 1878 and has a circulation of over 270,000.
