= Labour Relations Commission =

Japanese government commission

Labour Relations Commissions (労働委員会, Rōdō Iinkai) are Japanese government commissions responsible for protecting the legal rights of workers in Japan under the Constitution of Japan and the Trade Union Act of 1949.

== Structure ==
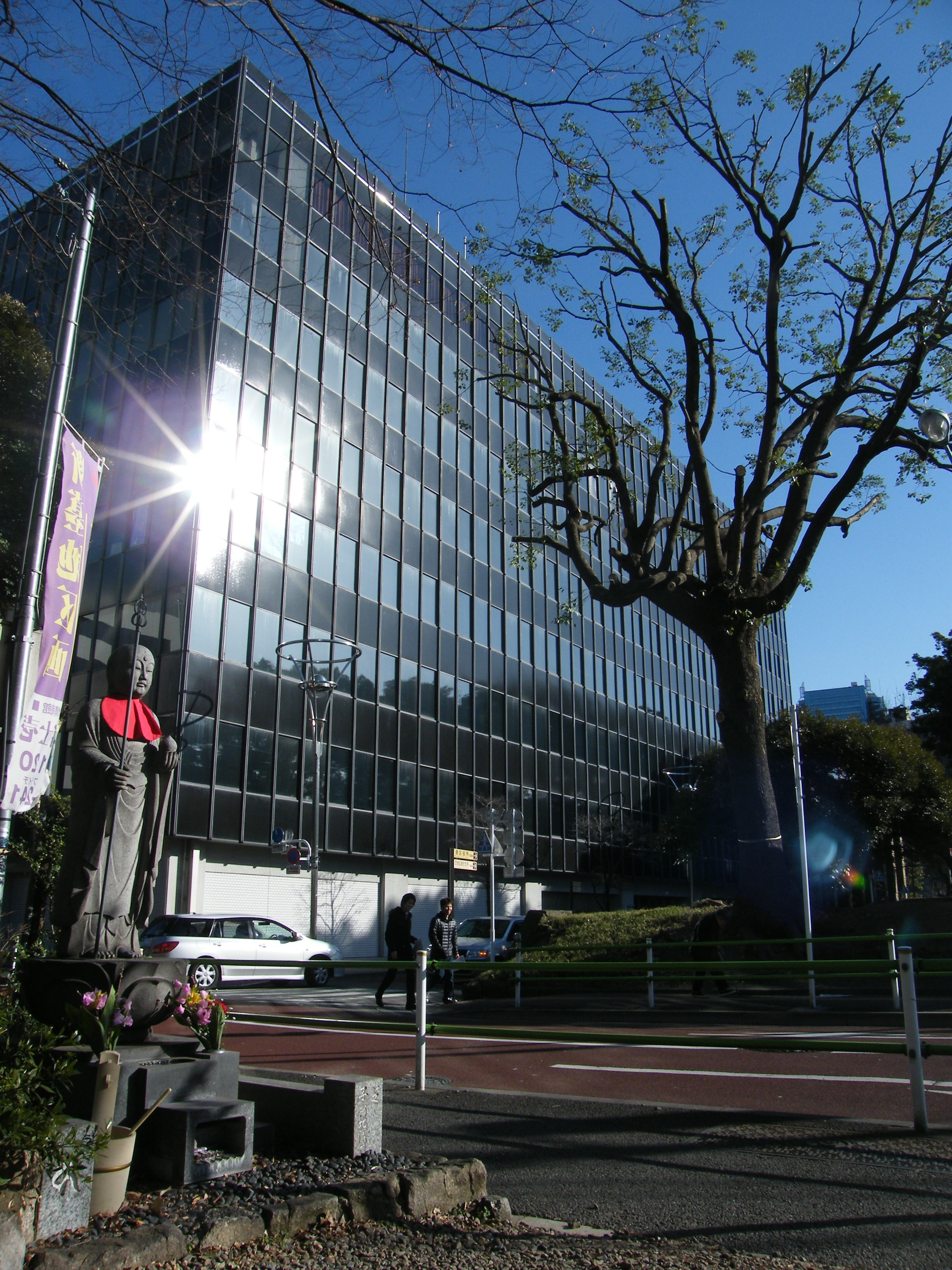
The Central Labour Relations Commission in Shiba Park, Minato-Ku Tokyo, Japan

Each of the 47 prefectures of Japan has a prefectural Labour Relations Commission. The Central Labour Relations Commission is located in Tokyo. Parties dissatisfied with a decision in one of the prefectural labour commissions can appeal the Central Labour Commission. It also hears cases of nationwide scale or great importance.

== Commissioners ==
Commissioners of the prefectural Labour Relations Commissions are appointed by the governor of the relevant prefecture, while those at the Central Labour Commission are appointed by the Prime Minister. Commissioner numbers are distributed equally among commissioners from union, employer, and public interest backgrounds.

== Functions ==
Labour Relations Commissions have two main functions:

1. Making administrative decisions (such as deciding unfair labour practices)
2. Adjusting labour relations (bringing together disputing parties)

While the labour commissions do have some powers to enforce decisions, they function more as forums to bring disputing parties together. More than 70% of cases end in some form of settlement.

== Length of cases ==
According to the labour ministry, from 1996 to 1999, the prefectural labour commissions took around 800 days on average to investigate a case, and the Central Labour Relations Commission spent 1,500 days in the reinvestigation process. It took roughly 500 days on average to litigate labour dispute trials brought before district courts. In 2003, various reforms were discussed to speed up the process of cases. In 2005, the Trade Union Act was amended to speed up the process of labour commission cases.

== Central Labour Relations Commission ==
In 2008, during the administration of Liberal Democratic Party Prime Minister Tarō Asō the government's devolution panel recommended abolishing the Central Labour Relations Commission and only retaining the prefectural labour relations commissions. The proposal was not adopted.

== Examples ==
The National Railway Workers' Union (Kokuro) affiliated to the National Trade Union Council (Zenrokyo) has filed many labour relations commission cases against JR East regarding various types of unfair labour practices.

A group of 23 petitions filed after 1991 alleged that 1,800 union members in six prefectures had been discriminated against in violation of article seven of the Trade Union Act of 1949. Local labour relations commissions recognized discrimination in three prefectures, (Kanagawa, Tokyo and Akita) and an order for redress was issued. The company appealed this to the Central Labour Relations Commission in Tokyo. The Central Labour Relations Commission brokered a deal, and in 2005, Kokuro withdrew the 23 cases claiming anti-union discrimination against its members. In return the company paid compensation estimated at 360 million yen.
