= Assistant Language Teacher =

Teaching assistant in Japan

An Assistant Language Teacher (ALT) is a foreign national serving as an assistant teacher (paraprofessional educator) in a classroom in Japan, particularly for English as a second language.

The role was created by the Japanese Ministry of Education at the time of the creation of the JET Programme as a translation of the term 外国語指導助手 (gaikokugo shidō joshu) or literally "foreign language instruction assistant". The terms AET (Assistant English Teacher), ELT (English Language Teacher) and NESA (Native English Speaking Assistant) are also in use. The term is used by the Ministry of Education, local Boards of Education (BOE) and schools in Japan primarily to refer to English language speakers who assist with teaching of English in elementary, junior high and senior high schools. However, some ALTs help teach languages other than English.

ALTs are typically required to be university graduates, but they are usually not certified teachers like their Japanese colleagues. In addition to a degree, ALTs are also required to either be native English speakers, or provide proof of learning the language for a specified period of time, usually at least five years.

== Role description ==
=== Requirements ===
The JET Programme set the general prerequisites imposed by Japanese immigration (bachelor's degree, health, nationality) and the characteristics that can be considered to be sought by the Japanese government, boards of education (BOEs), and schools.

In the case of ALTs from private language teaching companies, further requirements may include items such as TEFL certification, Japanese language ability (at least spoken) at a communicative level, teaching experience (both within Japan and in other countries) and other specialized skills (foreign languages other than English, IT, etc.) However, as a basic rule, the standards that are expected of JET Programme are still considered as norms among private language teaching companies that provide ALTs to BOEs, although agreements between BOEs and private companies often allow for a relaxing on some of these rules.

=== Recruitment ===
At one time, the majority of ALTs were recruited through the JET Programme, but now most are hired by private language teaching companies, also known as "dispatch companies", either within Japan or abroad. Once hired, ALTs are sent to work in junior and senior high-schools and, increasingly, in elementary schools throughout Japan. ALTs are either assigned to one main school, or can work at a number of different schools in their area. ALTs entering on the JET programme are not required to have any prior teaching experience or ESL training. Many ALTs hired privately have prior experience and/or training.

ALTs hired on the JET Programme typically enter either in July or August, but most private ALTs are usually on a contract which runs from April until at least the end of the third school term in March. Some AETs dispatched to City of Nagoya public schools have contracts that begin in mid-May and end in mid-February. Some ALTs also have set, paid holidays during the spring, summer and winter school vacations, in addition to all Japanese public holidays, but some ALTs are not paid between semesters or for national holidays, and do not receive paid vacation leave. By combining the 23 national holidays with the time off during school holidays, the actual number of working days per year is somewhere near 200 through private companies, which is one of the major attractions of the ALT position, however many schools require you to undertake other tasks when not teaching, so the actual hours worked are similar to other jobs in Japan. Most JET Programme ALTs are required to work through the school holidays, receiving the 23 national holidays plus annual leave as holiday time.

=== Payment ===
The pay for a private ALT is usually less than a full-time Eikaiwa teacher and far less than a teacher from the JET Programme (¥3.36 to ¥3.96 million depending on year in the program), with some of the lowest salaries around ¥180,000 per month (¥2.16 million annually).

=== Job duties ===
An ALT's primary duty is to assist Japanese teachers of English to deliver lessons in the classroom, and may be involved in lesson planning and other language teaching tasks. Regarding Elementary school, the term ALT is often misleading, in many instances the ALT leads the class themselves, and may solely be responsible for total lesson planning (for the academic year and delivering the lessons). This is mostly the case with Elementary schools outside of the Kanto region. During such lessons, Japanese teachers often act as a support teacher or translator. In those instances the term "Assistant" Language Teacher becomes unsuitable, as the ALT is not "assisting" but actually "leading and facilitating" the entire English class. However, in Junior Highschool and Highschool, the degree to which the Japanese teacher of English actually uses the ALT is usually decided at the discretion of the Japanese teacher. Some allow ALTs to plan and lead language activities in class, sometimes for the entire class period, while others make minimal use of their ALT, such as limiting them to reading new vocabulary words for the students to repeat and having the ALT walk between the rows of students while the students do writing assignments. An ALT also contributes information to teaching advisors on phraseology and pronunciation.

ALTs usually take part in three to five classes per day. The classes are usually 45 – 50 minutes in length. An ALT participates in about 17 to 20 classes per week. Sometimes ALTs are asked to help teach special education classes, which may include students who have barriers to learning. They may also be asked to take part in after/before school club activities (bukatsudō), such as sports, calligraphy, music or ikebana, to learn more about the culture alongside their students and to foster international exchange. However, some ALTs choose not to participate, or go from group to group just to visit. The English level of the students varies from school to school, and at some schools the students and teachers are unable to communicate in English in any meaningful way. Higher level high schools sometimes have an English club, which the ALT would attend and assist in the students' planning and preparations for debate contests, speech competitions and English camps.

ALTs may also be asked to perform tasks normally done by Japanese students and teachers, such as cleaning the school, cleaning drainage gutters, and removing snow from parking areas. ALTs at some schools, mostly junior high schools, are expected to eat lunch with the students. These ALTs might not be allowed to leave the school for lunch or to run personal errands during their break. ALTs may be instructed to use non-standard English in front of students. They are sometimes asked to perform clerical tasks, such as correcting student writing assignments, by the Japanese teachers. The overall duties of an ALT can vary hugely depending on the whims of teachers, schools, BOEs and cities. Responsibilities can be extremely minimal or more or less to the extent of a full time independent teacher. Therefore, contractual expectations and boundaries are not always matched by the reality of what's asked of an ALT at their schools.

== Overview of the private ALT system in Japan ==
In 1999, Dispatch Law (労働者派遣) was deregulated to allow dispatch companies to enter into other fields of work aside from the traditional industry of manufacturing, including education. Since then more and more local boards of education have turned to private language companies to provide ALTs rather than using the JET Programme.

The business of private language teaching companies providing ALTs is increasing and some with hundreds of ALTs are covering all parts of the country. There is the impression that the private sector in general continues to grow as The JET Programme loses share in the market. Private dispatch companies vary from large corporations to local firms.

=== Differences between JET Programme ALTs and private company ALTs ===
- Application: The JET Programme may be very competitive based on the hiring nation (the US, UK, Canada, Australia being examples) or very lax depending on the needs of the Programme for any fiscal year. Private ALT application processes vary, but tend to be highly competitive for smaller companies and very open with larger companies.
- Compensation: As of 2016, JET Programme ALTs are compensated between ¥3.36 and ¥3.96 million annually depending on their year in the program. JET Programme participants will on average receive a higher initial monthly salary than ALTs from most private companies. However, some private companies require ALTs with TEFL certification who may be compensated at a higher level. This is rare, however, with some dispatched ALTs earning as little as ¥2.2 million per annum.
- Support: The JET Programme has a nationwide support system for ALTs that tends to vary in utility based on the nature of each case. Private language companies that provide ALTs to BOEs vary in their approaches to supporting ALTs, ranging from a very hands-off approach to an experience more professionally invigorating than the JET Programme. Private ALTs tend to be more experienced and better trained to start, many being ex-JETs. Teacher support and professional development vary with company.
- Workload: The JET Programme typically follows the request of the BOE regarding the workload of each ALT. A frequent issue with JET Programme ALTs is being required to report to a town office or education center when school is not in session, often when they have no other work to do. In general, ALTs provided by private language teaching companies do not require ALTs to report to the local BOE on days when school is not in session, although they may be required to attend training or asked to take other work during working time. Typically workload and salary are related, in that lower pay is accompanied by fewer required working days or hours.
- External Work: JET Programme ALTs are generally prohibited from working outside the school. Private companies have differing policies that may or may not allow legal work on the side, however, most tend to either provide supplementary work at their own clients, or allow ALTs to seek extra work if they so choose.
- Contractual Term Limits: JET Programme ALTs have a limited number of years to be contracted (to a maximum of 3 or 5 years, with contract renewals happening yearly), while private companies have no such restriction in most cases.

The above list is by no means comprehensive, and some other categories that vary from situation to situation may include: the ability to transfer (both locationally and between positions), evaluation, reward systems, and professional development opportunities.

== Union activity ==
=== Education law ===
Some of the contracts that school boards have signed with private language teaching companies are illegal gyomu itaku (service contracts). According to the Japanese Ministry of Education, these contracts violate Japan's General Education Law since the principal must be in charge of all staff at their school. However, with these contracts, the company is actually in charge – not the principal.

The licensed Japanese teacher is normally in charge of junior high school and high school classes regardless of where the ALT originates; however in the case of elementary school classes, the ALT is normally responsible for the entire class, with the Japanese teacher either providing limited input or in some cases not being present in the classroom, and for that reason the continuity of school management is sometimes maintained with the school principal in compliance with any legal requirements, as the product being contracted itself is an abstract, education, and the contract basis for private language teaching corporations is to provide education and educational services.

=== 29.5 hours per week ===
It is common for ALTs to be recruited with job contracts with private language companies such as W5, Interac, Borderlink and WING which stipulates ALT working hours as being 29.5 hours per week. In actuality, working hours usually range from 30 to 40 hours due to the fact that transition times between classes and other brief periods of time throughout the working day are scheduled as breaktimes. Employers often have employees sign such contracts in an effort to avoid paying into the employer based Social Insurance program, or shakai hoken. While Social Insurance law states that all regular employees should be enrolled by their employer in Shakai Hoken, some companies will consistently tell their employees that they are ineligible. Their reasoning is that the 29.5 hours a week working time written into the contracts fall below an erroneous minimum of 3/4 full-time necessary for eligibility. The Social Insurance Agency uses the 3/4 of the hours of a similar full-time as a guideline. However, the Japanese government has recent stated that there is, in fact, no minimum legal work time requirement for enrollment in Shakai Hoken. Furthermore, no company would ever be prohibited from enrolling their employees in the Social Insurance program. Some AETs dispatched to the City of Nagoya have a 35-hour work week and are not enrolled in Shakai Hoken, receive no paid sick leave, no paid holidays, no paid vacation leave, and are not enrolled in unemployment insurance. They are only paid for days worked and receive no pay between semesters except for a few training sessions.

=== Kanagawa Board of Education ===
In 2006, ALTs in Kanagawa Prefecture who were previously hired directly as part-time workers rejected the privatization of their jobs to Interac, a nationwide language services dispatch company, and took the Kanagawa Prefecture Board of Education to the Labour Relations Board where the case is still on-going.

As in many cases, the likely cause of the dissolution of the direct-hire situation draws back to Prime Minister Junichiro Koizumi who took a hard-line stance on privatization (e.g. Japan Post) and the idea of allowing local governments more flexibility in deciding how to spend their budgets.

=== Other local Boards of Education ===
The General Workers Union has been involved with several boards of education in the Kanto area including the Tokyo Board of Education, the Koga Board of Education (in Ibaraki Prefecture) and the Fukaya Board of Education (in Saitama Prefecture). In the case versus the Tokyo Board of Education, the General Workers Union won a decision stating that the directly hired ALTs were indeed legally classified as "workers" (rodosha) and not simply contractors. Further victories were achieved through the private companies that had contracts with the Koga and Fukaya boards of education.

== See also ==
- Foreign-language assistant
- Education in Japan
- Expatriate
- JET Programme
