= Pre-consultation Agreement (Japan) =

A Pre-consultation Agreement (事前協議制, jizenkyougizei) is a type of agreement in Japan where a party will notify the other before taking certain actions. This type of agreement can be reached between various parties, one example being the 1960 Treaty of Mutual Cooperation and Security between the United States and Japan, where the US agreed to consult Japan before making large changes to its forces in Japan.

The agreements are also made in Japan between employers and unions representing employees. In this case, the agreements often mean that before employers make changes that will affect union members, they must consult with the union in question.
