= Tokyo District Court =

First instance court in Tokyo, Japan

Coordinates: 35°40′30″N 139°45′11″E

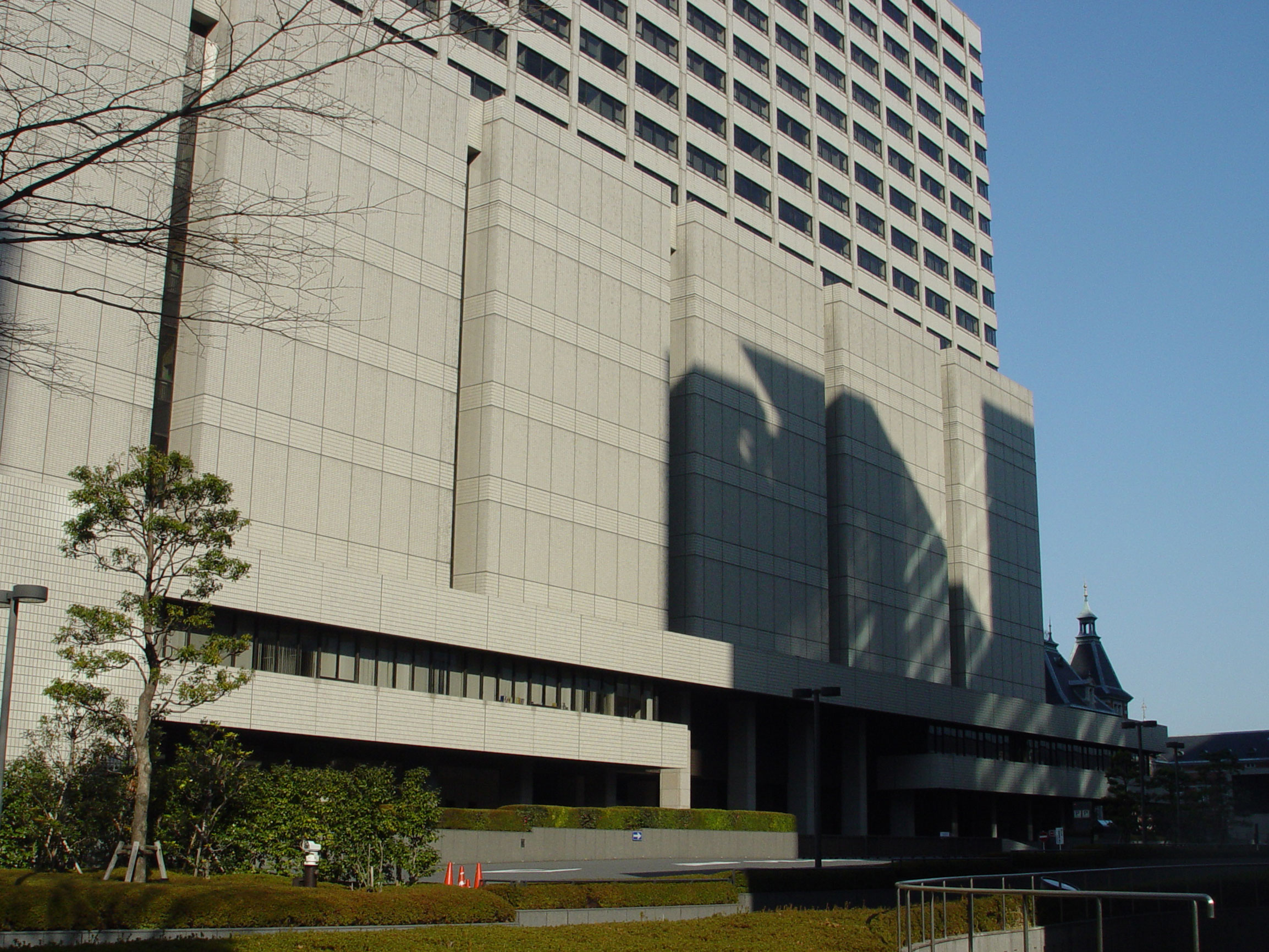
Tokyo District Court

Tokyo District Court (東京地方裁判所, Tōkyō Chihō Saibansho) is a district court located at 1-1-4 Kasumigaseki, Chiyoda, Tokyo, Japan.

== Jurisdiction ==
The Tokyo District Court is the largest district court in Japan. It has primary jurisdiction over first-instance criminal and civil cases within the 23 special wards of Tokyo, as well as the western Tama area and the outer islands (such as the Izu and Ogasawara Islands). It handles a significant portion of Japan's major corporate, financial, and intellectual property disputes due to the concentration of major businesses in the capital.

== Structure ==
The court operates out of its main building in Kasumigaseki, alongside the Tokyo High Court and the Intellectual Property High Court. It is divided into civil and criminal divisions, where cases are heard either by a single judge or a three-judge panel, depending on the severity and complexity of the matter. For certain serious criminal cases, the court utilizes the saiban-in (lay judge) system.

== See also ==
- Judicial system of Japan
- Supreme Court of Japan
- 2001 Japan Airlines mid-air incident
