= Eikaiwa school =

English conversation school in Japan

Eikaiwa kyōshitsu (英会話教室) or Eikaiwa gakkō (英会話学校) are English conversation schools, usually privately operated, in Japan. It is a combination of the word eikaiwa (英会話; English language conversation) and kyōshitsu (教室; classroom) or gakkō (学校; school).

== Overview ==
Although Japanese public education mandates that English be taught as part of the curriculum from the fifth grade, the focus is generally on English grammar and how to pass the test, after which most students stop using English and forget most of what they have learned. People attend eikaiwa to supplement their studies, learn a second language, improve their business skills, as a hobby, to improve social opportunities, or to prepare for travel or a relationship with a foreigner. Many parents send their child to eikaiwa with the aim of improving the child's prospects for higher education or to broaden the child's horizons by exposing them to foreign cultures.

The major eikaiwa chains have branches all over Japan, and there are large numbers of smaller independent outfits. Several chains offer lessons in languages other than English, including Chinese, French, German, Italian, Korean, and Spanish. These are taught primarily at larger city branches or through video calls. In 2002, the eikaiwa industry in Japan generated ¥670 billion in revenue, of which the five largest chains (Nova, GEOS, ECC, Aeon, and Berlitz) accounted for 25%. Nova, the biggest, filed for bankruptcy in October 2007 but was revived under different management. Berlitz was once considered one of the "Big Four" but its market share declined and it was overtaken by ECC, which (alongside Aeon) became one of the two most widely known eikaiwa.

Foreign teachers are often the principal selling point of an eikaiwa business. Eikaiwa teachers are usually native English speakers from countries such as Australia, Canada, Ireland, New Zealand, the United Kingdom, or the United States. The large eikaiwa chains run extensive television and print advertising campaigns, sometimes featuring Japanese or foreign celebrities, and aim to build a high profile and strong brand recognition based on the personal and professional qualities of the foreign teachers working for them.

A 2008 assessment of the language study market for fiscal year 2007 showed that the eikaiwa industry had shrunk by over 61%, an effect of Nova's collapse, although demand for specific English-language lessons in areas such as software and children's education had increased. GEOS filed for bankruptcy in April 2010 and was acquired by Nova.

== Controversies ==
Average salaries for eikaiwa teachers have generally fallen since the 1980s, and their unions have attempted to combat the decline in pay and benefits with mixed results. According to The Japan Times, figures published by the Ministry of Justice in 2005 estimated that 90% of foreign residents in Japan left within three years of arriving, a figure that reached as high as 97% for eikaiwa teachers.

American Club, once the largest eikaiwa in Tochigi, was sued twice in 13 months by its employees for withheld wages in the 1990s. During the second lawsuit, the school's directors fled while ignoring a court order to pay. News reports indicated the business was closed, but its business registration still lists it a legal operating entity with ¥30 million in equity and no mention of bankruptcy.

The collapse of Nova in 2007 left thousands of foreigners with no source of income and, in the majority of cases, no accommodation after their contracts were abruptly cancelled.

In 2014, the eikaiwa Gaba came under fire from local media for its handling of sexual harassment complaints against students; in the absence of a grievance procedure, the Gaba branch of the General Union resorted to collective bargaining to resolve at least one dispute.
