= National Union of General Workers (Zenrokyo) =

Trade union in Japan

NUGW
- National Union of General Workers National Council (National Union of General Workers)
- Founded: 1 December 1991
- Headquarters: Shiba 2-8-13, KITA Heim Shiba 3rd Floor, Minato-ku, Tokyo, Japan
- Location: Japan
- Key people: Takashi Ohno (Chair), Akinori Ikeuchi (General Secretary) http://www.nugw.jp/
- Affiliations: National Trade Union Council
- Website: NUGW (in English); NUGW (in Japanese)

The National Union of General Workers (NUGW) (Note: In full, National Union of General Workers National Council (全国一般労働組合全国協議会, Zenkoku Ippan Roudou Kumiai Zenkoku Kyogikai).) is a Japanese national labour union council established in 1991. The NUGW is affiliated to the National Trade Union Council, the smallest of the three national labour federations in Japan. As of September 2010 the NUGW had around 7000 members.

The NUGW acts as an umbrella organization encompassing roughly 40 autonomous general unions and trade unions, including the National Union of General Workers Tokyo Nambu (often referred to as simply Nambu), a union which represents workers in southern Tokyo and Eastern Japan; the National Union of General Workers, Tokyo (also known as Tokyo Union), which represents parts of Tokyo and Saitama Prefecture, the General Union, headquartered in Osaka, representing Western Japan, and the Fukuoka General Union, representing Kyūshū.

The union works to raise awareness of problems faced by all workers in Japan, including foreign/migrant workers, to improve members' working conditions and bargaining power and to inform members of their rights under Japanese labour law. Activities include strikes, rallies and leafleting, filing injunctions and arguing cases at Labour Commissions and District Courts on issues such as fixed-term contracts, the non-enrollment of employees into Social Insurance, illegal outsourcing of Assistant Language Teachers by public schools, and unfair dismissals due to one-year contracts.

== See also ==
- Labor unions in Japan
- Zenrokyo
- General Union (Japan)
- University Teachers Union (Japan)
