= Trade Union Act of 1949 =

Japanese Law

The Trade Union Law (労働組合法, roudou-kumiaihō) is a Japanese law. It was enacted on 1 June 1949 to provide the right for workers to organize in Japan. It has been translated as the "Trade Union Law" and "Labor Union Law".

== Historical origins ==
=== Pre-war Trade Union bills ===
After the First World War there were many attempts to establish a trade union law to protect the rights of workers to organize themselves, including a Department of Home Affairs bill in 1925, which would have prevented employers from discharging workers for belonging to a union, or requiring workers to quit (or not join) a union. But these bills never became law.

=== The Potsdam Declaration ===
As the Second World War was nearing its end, on 26 July 1945, Allied leaders Winston Churchill, Harry S Truman, and Chiang Kai-shek issued the Potsdam Declaration, which demanded Japan's unconditional surrender. This declaration also defined the major goals of the postsurrender Allied occupation: "The Japanese government shall remove all obstacles to the revival and strengthening of democratic tendencies among the Japanese people. Freedom of speech, of religion, and of thought, as well as respect for the fundamental human rights shall be established" (Section 10). In addition, the document stated: "The occupying forces of the Allies shall be withdrawn from Japan as soon as these objectives have been accomplished and there has been established in accordance with the freely expressed will of the Japanese people a peacefully inclined and responsible government" (Section 12). The Allies sought not merely punishment or reparations from a militaristic foe, but fundamental changes in the nature of its political system. In the words of political scientist Robert E. Ward: "The occupation was perhaps the single most exhaustively planned operation of massive and externally directed political change in world history."

== 1945 Trade Union Law ==
After the Japanese surrender on 15 August 1945, allied forces, mostly American, rapidly began arriving in Japan. Almost immediately, the occupiers began an intensive program of legal changes designed to democratize Japan. One action was to ensure the creation of a Trade Union law to allow for the first time workers to organize, strike, and bargain collectively, which was passed by the Diet of Japan on 22 December 1945.

=== Drafting process ===
While the law was created while Japan was under occupation, the law itself was largely a Japanese work. It was put together by a large legal advisory commission headed by the legal scholar Suehiro Izutaro. The commission was quite large, consisting of "three Welfare ministry bureaucrats and two scholars, a steering committee of 30 members (including the communist firebrand Kyuichi Tokuda), and an overall membership of more than 130 members representing universities, corporations, political parties, the bureaucracy, social workers, and labor."

=== The post-war Japanese Constitution ===
The constitution of Japan, which became law on 3 May 1947 includes article 28, which guarantees the right of workers to participate in a trade union.

== 1949 Law and subsequent amendments ==
On 1 June 1949 a new version of the Trade Union Law was enacted. It has since been amended in 1950, 1951, 1952, 1954, 1959, 1962, 1966, 1971, 1978, 1980, 1983, 1984, 1988, 1993, 1999, 2002, 2004, and 2005.

== Main provisions ==
=== Structure ===
The law consists of 5 chapters, an order for the enforcement of the Trade Union law, and supplementary provisions:

- Chapter 1 General Provisions (Articles 1–4)
- Chapter 2 Labor Unions (Articles 5–13)
- Chapter 3 Labor Relations Commissions

Section 1 Establishment, Duties, and Matters under the Jurisdiction, Organizations, etc. (Articles 19–26) Section 2 Procedures for Examination of Cases of Unfair Labor Practices (Articles 27 - 27–19) Section 3 Lawsuits (Articles 27-19 - 27–21)

- Section 4 Miscellaneous Provisions (Articles 27-22 - 27–26)
- Chapter 5 Penal Provisions (Articles 28–33)
- Order for the enforcement of the trade union act
- Supplementary Provisions

== Unfair Labor Practices ==
Prohibited under Article 7 of the Act, an unfair labor practice is when an employer interferes with the rights of workers to join, organize, or take part in union activities, and also for an employer refusing to collectively bargain with a union.

== See also ==
- Japanese labour law
