= National Trade Union Council (Japan) =

- National Trade Union Council
- Zenkoku Rōdōkumiai Renraku Kyōgi-kai
- Founded: December 9, 1989
- Headquarters: Kawaguchi Building 6th floor 6-7-1 Shimbashi, Minato, Tokyo, Japan
- Location: Japan
- Members: 101,000
- Key people: Hisashi Kanazawa, (chairman) Motoaki Nakaoka (General Secretary)
- Affiliations: Social Democratic Party, New Socialist Party
- Website: www.zenrokyo.org

The National Trade Union Council (全国労働組合連絡協議会, Zenkoku Rōdōkumiai Renraku Kyōgi-kai), commonly known in Japanese as Zenrōkyō (全労協), is a national confederation of Japanese labor unions. There was another organization of the same name from 1947 to 1950.

== Founding and history ==
In the late 1980s there were many changes in the trade union movement in Japan. The two major bodies of trade unions, the General Council of Trade Unions of Japan (Sōhyō) and the Japanese Confederation of Labor (Dōmei), formed the National Confederation of Trade Unions (Rengo) in 1989, advocating the importance of the Japanese Labor Union movement being unified. On the other hand, a number of other labor unions which felt Rengo was too conservative, formed the National Confederation of Trade Unions (Zenroren), which had a close relationship with the Japanese Communist Party.

There were some other labor unions which did not wish to join either Rengo or Zenroren, who formed the National Trade Union Council on December 9, 1989 with its slogan of being a "Real fighting labor union movement". This organization was born out of the Labor Research Center, which had been created by former Sōhyō chairmen Kaoru Ota and Makoto Ichikawa and former secretary general Akira Iwai.

Unlike organizations such as Sōhyō or Zenroren, Zenrokyo regards itself as a council of its affiliated labor unions, rather than a national center of labor unions. Despite this, given that it has national coverage with its affiliated member organizations being widely spread throughout the nation, it is often regarded as one of the national centers of labor unions in Japan.

== Currently ==
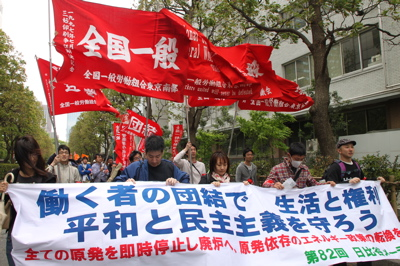
National Trade Union Council (Zenrokyo) May Day march, Tokyo

Zenrokyo holds a regular annual conference. Its most recent, the 23rd annual conference, was held in September 2011.

Estimates of Zenrokyo's membership vary. Zenrokyo itself declares its membership to be some 300,000, while according to the investigation by the Ministry of Health, Labor, and Welfare its numbers were reported as 118,000 as of December, 2010.

In terms of its membership, Zenrokyo is much smaller than Rengo and Zenroren. However, it is also the only one of the major trade union federations to actively organize foreign workers in Japan.

Its membership rose to 128,000 as of the end of June 2011.

Politically, Zenrokyo has had a close relation with the left group of the Social Democratic Party, and it supports both the Social Democratic Party and the New Socialist Party. However, Zenrokyo does not force its members to raise funds as an organization or to support the political parties mentioned above, and it regrets that this was done in the Sōhyō period.

== Zenrokyo's priorities ==
- Safeguarding the Peace Constitution
- Opposition to war
- Opposition to US Military Facilities in Japan
- Support for the Peace movement
- Opposition to dismissals and restructuring, as shown in Zenrokyo's support for the JNR dismissal lawsuit.

In addition to this, Zenrokyo cooperates with Zenroren and Rengo on some issues.

== Affiliated unions ==
Abbreviation	Union	Founded	Membership (2019)
DENTSU ROUSO	Telecommunications Industry Labor Union		
KOKURO	National Railway Workers' Union	1946	7,400
KYOIKU GODO	Education Workers and Amalgamated Union Osaka		
TOROREN	Federation of Tokyo Metropolitan Government Workers' Unions	1946	30,297
YUSEI UNION	Postal Industry Workers Union		2,466
ZENKOKUIPPAN-ZENKOKUKYO	National Union of General Workers	1991	7,997
ZENTOITSU	Zentoitsu Workers' Union		4,756

There are also other labor unions. Local organizations in 10 prefectures and 1 region of Japan.

== See also ==
- Labor unions in Japan
- National Union of General Workers
- General Union (Japan)
- University Teachers Union
