= Government Pension Investment Fund =

Administrative agency in Japan

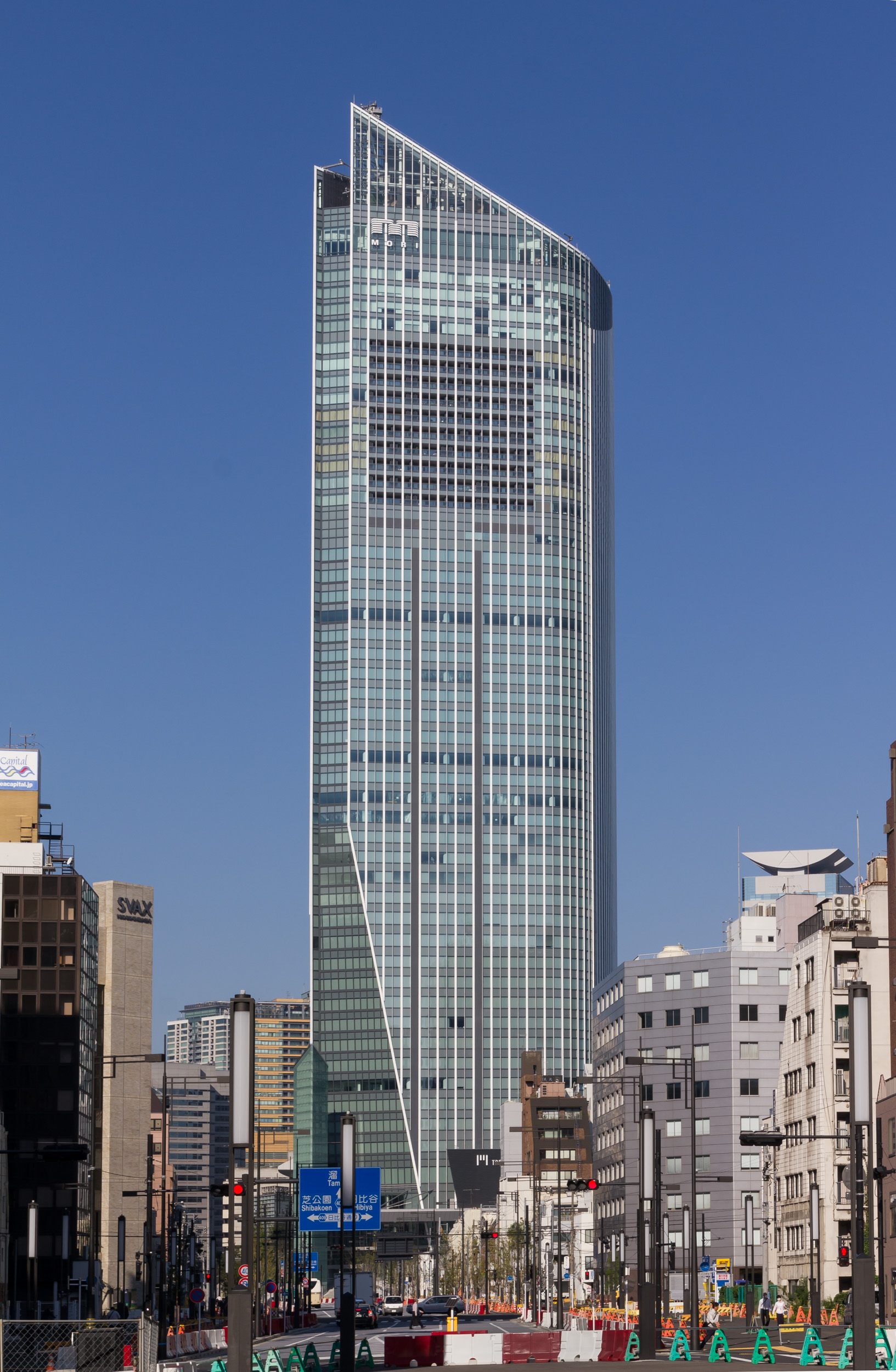
- Headquarters at Toranomon Hills
- Native name: 年金積立金管理運用独立行政法人
- Type: Independent Administrative Institution
- Industry: Financial services
- Founded: 2006
- Headquarters: Toranomon Hills, Toranomon, Minato, Tokyo, Japan
- Key people: Kazuto Uchida (President); Yoshizawa Yusuke (CIO); Hirohide Yamaguchi (Chairperson)
- AUM: ▲¥320 trillion (2026-Q1) ($2.02 trillion)
- Website: www.gpif.go.jp

Government Pension Investment Fund (年金積立金管理運用独立行政法人, Nenkin Tsumitate-kin Kanri Un'yō Dokuritsu-gyōsei-Hōjin), or GPIF, is an incorporated administrative agency (an independent administrative institution), established in 2006 by the Japanese government. It is the largest pool of retirement savings in the world. Japan's GPIF is the largest public fund investor in Japan by assets and is a major proponent of the Stewardship Principles. In the first quarter of 2026, GPIF had ¥320 trillion ($2.02 trillion) in assets under management.

== Governance ==
GPIF is reporting directly to the Japanese Ministry of Health, Labour and Welfare, while it commissions external asset management institutions with investments. The board of governors consists of the president Kazuto Uchida, planning and general affairs director Izumi Junichi, CIO Yoshizawa Yusuke, chairperson Hirohide Yamaguchi and eight other regular members.

== Profile ==
The Government Pension Investment Fund (GPIF) states that it has been established on the following investment principles:

- The overarching goal should be achieve the investment returns required for the public pension system with minimal risks, solely for the benefit of pension recipients from a long-term perspective, thereby contributing to the stability of the system.
- The primary investment strategy should be diversification by asset class, region, and timeframe. While acknowledging fluctuations of market prices in the short term, we shall achieve investment returns in a more stable and efficient manner by taking advantage of our long-term investment horizon, whilst at the same time we shall secure sufficient liquidity to pay pension benefits.
- We formulate the policy asset mix, and manage and control risks at the levels of the overall asset portfolio, each asset class, and each asset manager. We employ both passive and active investments to benchmark returns (i.e. average market returns) set for each asset class, while seeking untapped profitable investment opportunities.
- By fulfilling our responsibilities, we shall continue to maximise medium-to long-term equity investment returns for the benefit of pension recipients.

In 2019, GPIF started to invest into the Asian Development Banks Green Bonds.

Since April 2020, the GPIF invests in a mix of roughly 50% stocks and 50% bonds. This is subdivided into 25% domestic equities, 25% international equities, 25% domestic bonds, and 25% international bonds. The amount of each asset class is allowed to deviate up to 6–8 percentage points from its target allocation.

In the first quarter of 2026, GPIF reported a record quarterly profit of ¥24,09 trillion ($151.8 billion). This strong performance was attributed to high global stock performance and the weakness of the Japanese Yen which increased overseas returns.

== Collaboration ==
The GPIF has diversified investments with the following external asset management institutions:

- (United Kingdom) Aberdeen Asset Management
- (Germany) Allianz Global Investors
- (Japan) Asset Management One
- (France) AXA Investment Managers
- (United Kingdom) Baillie Gifford
- (United States) BNY Mellon Investment Management
- (United States) BlackRock
- (United States) Capital Group Companies
- (United States) Citigroup
- (France) Crédit Agricole
- (United States) Dimensional Fund Advisors
- (United States) Fidelity Investments
- (United States) Goldman Sachs
- (Netherlands) ING
- (United States) Invesco
- (United States) Janus Capital Group
- (United States) JP Morgan
- (France) Lazard
- (Japan) Mitsubishi UFJ Financial Group
- (Japan) Mizuho Financial Group
- (United States) Morgan Stanley
- (Japan) Nomura
- (United States) Northern Trust
- (United States) PIMCO
- (United Kingdom) Prudential
- (United States) PGIM
- (Japan) Resona Holdings
- (United States) Russell Investments
- (France) Société Générale
- (United States) State Street Global Advisors
- (Japan) Sumitomo Mitsui Financial Group
- (Canada) Sun Life
- (Japan) Tokio Marine
- (United States) Wellington Management
- (United States) Wells Fargo

== See also ==
- Pension fund
- Ministry of Health, Labor, and Welfare
- Social Insurance Agency
- National Pension (Japan)—mentions International (bilateral) Social Security Agreements
- Japan Pension Service
