= 1979 Saga gubernatorial election =

Election for Governor of Saga Prefecture

← 1975	8 April 1979	1983 →
Nominee	Kumao Katsuki	Hideaki Yamazaki	Kōzō Eguchi
Party	Independent	Independent	JCP
Popular vote	186,245	126,321	17,590
Nominee	Yoshito Ushimaru	Tsumo Nakamura
Party	Independent	Independent
Popular vote	15,119	12,765
Governor before election
Sunao Ikeda
Independent
Elected Governor
Kumao Katsuki
Independent

A gubernatorial election was held on 8 April 1979 to elect the Governor of Saga Prefecture. Kumao Katsuki won the election.

== Candidates ==
- Kumao Katsuki - Deputy Governor of Saga Prefecture, age 63
- Hideaki Yamazaki (山崎英顕, Yamazaki Hideaki), age 63
- Yoshito Ushimaru - former Social Insurance Agency Commissioner, age 55
- Kōzō Eguchi (江口子午三, Eguchi Kōzō) - candidate in the 1971 Saga gubernational election and three-time House of Councillors candidate, age 70
- Tsumo Nakamura (中村都茂, Nakamura Tsumo) - also a House of Representatives candidate in the same year, age 30

== Results ==
Saga Gubernational Election 1979
Party	Candidate	Votes	%	±%
Independent	Kumao Katsuki	186,245		
Independent	Hideaki Yamazaki	126,321		
JCP	Kōzō Eguchi	17,590		
Independent	Yoshito Ushimaru	15,119		
Independent	Tsumo Nakamura	12,765		
