= CIG Pannonia =

Hungarian multinational financial services company

CIG Pannonia Nyrt.
- Type: Public
- Traded as: BPSE: CIG; BUX Component
- Industry: Insurance; Financial services
- Founded: 2007
- Headquarters: Budapest, Hungary
- Area served: Central Europe
- Key people: Péter Bogdánffy (Chairman); István Fedák (CEO)
- Products: Life and Non-life Insurance, Commercial & Consumer, Life & Retirement Insurance
- Revenue: ▲US$ 105.77 million (2017)
- Website: cigpannonia.com

CIG Pannonia Life Insurance Plc. is a Hungarian multinational financial services company headquartered in Budapest. Its core business and focus is life and non-life insurance. At present, CIG Pannonia is engaged in the life insurance business in Hungary, Romania and Slovakia.

== History ==
=== Foundation ===
On 26 October 2007, the company was founded by well-known and acknowledged public figures and insurance experts from Hungary; its original name was CIG Central European Insurance Company. CIG was supported by the U.S. Inverstment bank Lehman Brothers. It also had a successful partnership with Brokernet, one of Hungary's largest financial agencies. In 2008, the company became market leader in niche markets like regular-premium, unit-linked life insurance products and closed the year with a turnover of US$13 million. In 2009, CIG held a 3% market share in domestic life insurance and generated over US$40 million in sales.

On 1 January 2010, the company changed its name to CIG Pannonia Life Insurance Ltd. Later that year, the insurer commenced operations as a public limited company. The company's shares have been listed on the Budapest Stock Exchange. The first trading day was November 8, 2010.

Between 2011 and 2015 CIG started its 100% non-life subsidiary, which focuses on domestic SMEs, Institutions of the state and local authorities, companies, professional chambers and associations. Throughout the years the subsidiary grew and stayed profitable. On the other hand, 2015 was the year when CIG broke up with Brokernet, setting up an all-time low at 135 HUF. This event disappointed many individual investors and speculants. As a result, the stock became an unpopular investment in 2016. Between 2016 and 2018 the company attracted another institutional investor, the Konzlum Plc. They bought a 24.85% stake in CIG pushing up the stock price between 400 and 500 HUF.

=== Regional expansion ===
The first step of the company's regional expansion was the launch of the sale of its products in Romania in May 2009. Later, in September 2010, the company began its sales activities in Slovakia as well. On 1 September 2010, the Company became a public limited company and is now called CIG Pannónia Life Insurance Plc. (CIG Pannónia Életbiztosító Nyrt.). The subscription procedure in October 2010 was highly successful and drew massive public interest. Later, after the initial public offering, the Company requested to be listed on the Budapest Stock Exchange and from 2011 listed on BSE's prime market.

In April 2012 CIG started a cross-border service in Poland in the non-life segment. Followed by the Baltic States in 2013. The company launched their cross-border service in the non-life segment in Italy in September 2014 and in Spain in September 2017.

== Products and business model ==
The main products include unit-linked life insurance and pension insurance, but CIG also sells traditional life insurance, funeral insurance, endowment and term life insurance and health insurance. Its subsidiary operates the property insurance business not only in Hungary but also in many European countries through cross-border services.

CIG is primarily active in the life insurance sector. The most profitable products are pension insurance and unit-linked insurance.

== Owners and management ==
Former Minister of Finance and chairman of the central bank Zsigmond Járai was appointed to chair the supervisory board, which represents the owners. Béla Horváth, former executive of various Hungarian insurance companies, was appointed as the chairman of the board of directors. The position of the CEO has been filled by dr. Ottó Csurgó since 18 April 2012, who is also the CEO of CIG Pannónia First Hungarian General Insurance Plc. The company is heir in spirit to the First Hungarian General Insurance Company (Első Magyar Általános Biztosító Társaság) founded in 1857 by Henrik Lévay.

In September 2020, the company liquidated its Hungarian subsidiary, CIG Pannónia Pénzügyi Közvetítő Zrt, in which Hungarikum Alkusz Kft, owned by Erik Keszthelyi and Lőrinc Mészáros, subsequently acquired a 25% stake. From 1 October 2020, István Fedák took over as CEO, replacing Gabriella Kádár, who had previously held the position for 6 years. From January 2021, Zoltán Polányi became chairman of the board of directors and the other CEO alongside Fedák.

In October 2021, CIG Pannónia announced that Hungarikum Biztosítási Alkusz Kft. had acquired 55.5 percent of the voting shares in the listed company, making it the majority shareholder. In September 2022, Hungarikum increased its ownership by a further one and a half percent.
