= Welfare in Japan =

Social welfare, assistance for the ill or otherwise disabled and the old, has long been provided in Japan by both the government and private companies. Beginning in the 1920s, the Japanese government enacted a series of welfare programs, based mainly on European models, to provide medical care and financial support. During the post-war period, a comprehensive system of social security was gradually established. Universal health insurance and a pension system were established in 1960.

The futures of health and welfare systems in Japan are being shaped by the rapid aging of the population. The mixture of public and private funding has created complex pension and insurance systems, meshing with Japanese traditional calls for support within the family and by the local community for welfare recipients.

== The Japanese welfare state ==
The tax and transfer system in Japan (MHLW 2017)

Japan's welfare state has a non-typical conservative regime. Similar to other conservative countries, Japan has an occupational segmented social insurance system. Pre-war Japan once adopted a German-style social policy. Japan also borrowed ideas of pensions and health from the German system. In addition, Japan's welfare state embodies familialism, whereby families rather than the government will provide the social safety net. However, a drawback of a welfare state with the familialism is its lack of childcare social policy.

In Japan, 65% of the elderly live with their children, and the typical household is composed of three generations. The difference between Japan's welfare state and the traditional conservative system is the residual welfare state and the significantly low social transfer rate that Japan has. The social policies of the 1960s and 1970s were made as a compensation for failed industrial and economic policies. The social policy became a platform of electoral strategies only in the 1980s and 1990s, which happened after Japan's Liberal Democratic Party (LDP) lost its domination in the parliament in 1993. Also, social welfare programs extended to areas that were not productive and to people like the elderly or disabled who were not productive. Finally, the Japanese government provided social care programs to the elderly and children, along with the policy that promoted general equality. This contradicted the humanistic aspects of Confucianism's explanation, suggesting it was not appropriate to describe the Japanese welfare system as a "Productivist Welfare Regime".

=== Welfare expenditure ===
Social expenditure of Japan

Japan also has comparatively low social spending: among the OECD countries in 1995, Japan spent only 14.0% of its GDP on social expenditures, lower than many other OECD countries: this figure compares to 15.4% in the US, 20.4% in the UK, 19.8% in Italy, 26.6% in Germany, 28.3% in France, and 32.5% in Sweden. Since Japan maintained sustained economic growth after World War II and had increasing equality, Japan's economic and social structure was perceived as somehow different from the European and North American models. This difference was explained in 2000 by a model called the "Productivist Welfare Regime". The model argued that the central economic policies conducted by the conservative Liberal Democratic Party from 1955 through 1993 caused Japan's economic growth in the post-war era. Since the Productivist Welfare Regime purposely provided extended social welfare only to those linked to productive sectors in society, to encourage economic production, it provided the economic gain. The Japanese familialism of its social care system, based on its Confucianism tradition, relieved the government from having to face social welfare stress, and undermined necessary gender welfare in Japan.

Government expenditures for all forms of social welfare increased from 6% of the national income in the early 1970s to 18% in 1989. Medical insurance, health care for the elderly, and public health expenses constituted about 60% of social welfare and social security costs in 1975, while government pensions accounted for 20%. By the early 1980s, pensions accounted for nearly 50% of social welfare and social security expenditures because people were living longer after retirement. A fourfold increase in workers' individual contributions was projected by the twenty-first century.

=== Early history ===
The earliest Japanese idea of welfare first appeared in 1874 during the Meiji Period when Mercy and Relief Regulation introduced a cash allowance exclusively to orphans under 13, those who were unable to work due to illness, disabilities or old age and those who were under 15 or over 70 and lived in extreme poverty. In 1897, the Japan Social Policy Association was established and was modeled on the equivalent German association. The concern of social work increased in the Japanese government. In the 1920s, large companies, such as Kanegafuchi Spinning Company and Tokyo Spinning Company, adopted a company welfare system to provide occupational welfare while there are not any signals of trade union-based welfare systems. In 1929, the Poor Relief Act was passed to relieve the tensions between labor and capital. The Poor Relief Act recognized the obligation of the state to support the poor with the national income. In 1938, during the Second Sino-Japanese War, the government officially established the Ministry of Health and Welfare. Japan adopted the familialism as part of the welfare system to enhance the national cohesion. In 1947, the new Constitution came into effect. Article 25 recognized the right of all people to maintain the minimum standards of cultured living and it emphasized the obligation of the state to provide social welfare, social security and public health. The Japanese government put this obligation into practice. From 1947 to 1970, the government legislated the Child Welfare Act (1947), the Physically Disabled Persons Welfare Act (1949), the Social Welfare Act (1951), the Act for the Welfare of the Mentally Retarded Persons (1960), the Act for the Welfare of the Aged (1963) and the Act on Welfare of Mothers with Dependents and Widows (1964). During the 1970s and 1980s, Japan adopted a Japanese-style welfare society. Also In 1973, Prime Minister Tanaka Kakuei introduced the "Welfare Year One." Owing to the oil shock and large government spending in social policy, Japan suffered from the deficit and recession. The government tried to control the social expenditure by reforming the National Health Insurance and the public pension system. In the 1990s, due to the severe aging society problem, the focus moved to social support to develop social service for child-rearing and care for the elder and working women. In 2012, the government promoted a production-first policy, called Abenomics and redirected the attention from welfare and social protection to economic recovery.

== Pension system ==
In Japan there are three types of Japanese national pensions arranged by the government and corporate organizations.

The basic pension (Category I)
Providing minimal benefits. The basic pension (premium is a fixed amount)
A secondary part (Category II)
Providing benefits, based on income up until retirement. Employees Pension Insurance, Mutual Aid Pensions (Premium is a fixed percentage of monthly income)
A third part
Company Pensions (Employees' Pension Fund, Tax-qualified Pension Plan. The premium depends on the organization)

Enrollment in an employees' pension plan or a mutual-aid pension automatically enrolls one in the basic pension system as well.

National pension plan
A secondary part			Employees Pension Insurance	National Public Service Mutual Aid Pension	Local Public Service Mutual Aid Pension	Private School Teachers and Employees Mutual Aid Pension
The basic pension	The National Pension Fund (The basic pension)					
Insured persons	Employers, unemployed persons, and part-time & casual workers or equivalents Salaried employees who do not meet necessary conditions for members of an employees' pension plan	Spouses of category II insured persons	Company employees	Public employees		
	Category I insured persons	Category III insured persons	Category II insured persons			

Other pension plans
Individual type	Worker's property accumulation promotion system
Individual type	Personal type Defined Contribution Pension Plan
Corporate type	Defined benefit pension plan
Corporate type	Employees' pension funds
Corporate type	Tax-qualified Pension Plans
Corporate type	Defined Contribution Pension Plans
Corporate type	Retirement mutual aid pensions for small sized businesses
Corporate type	Retirement mutual aid pensions for specific small sized businesses

A major revision in the public pension system in 1986 unified several former plans into the single Employee Pension Insurance Plan. In addition to merging the former plans, the 1986 reform attempted to reduce benefits to hold down increases in worker contribution rates. It also established the right of women who did not work outside the home to pension benefits of their own, not only as a dependent of a worker. Everyone aged between twenty and sixty was a compulsory member of this Employee Pension Insurance Plan.

Despite complaints that these pensions amounted to little more than "spending money," increasing numbers of people planning for their retirement counted on them as an important source of income. Benefits increased so that the basic monthly pension was about US$420 in 1987, with future payments adjusted to the consumer price index. Forty percent of elderly households in 1985 depended on various types of annuities and pensions as their only sources of income.

Some people are also eligible for corporate retirement allowances. About 90% of firms with thirty or more employees gave retirement allowances in the late 1980s, frequently as lump sum payments but increasingly in the form of annuities.

Pension Reform in an Aging Japan

The public pension system in Japan is obligated to review its own financial stability every five years and thus it is reformed to a degree every five years, with some notable reformation years. In 1942, the Employees Pension Insurance was formed for private sector employees. In 1954, it was rebuilt, replacing the previously established earnings-based pension model with a two-tier model including a basic flat-rate feature. Disparity existed between private and public sector pension plans as public sector pension benefit levels were generally better and more widely covered. To address the lack of coverage for certain private sector employees, the National Pension law was passed in 1961 that set up a compulsory savings system requiring everyone from self-employers to the jobless to pay a flat-contribution rate on an individual basis for a flat-rate benefits package. In 1986, women obtained a way into the pension system through their husbands via contributions deducted from the husband's pay, which entitled the wife to a flat-rate basic pension plan. In 1999, due to the economic downturn, the government froze increases in pension contributions and altered the age requirement to receive old age benefits from 60 to 65.

Japan has the fastest aging population in the world due to a combination of low birth rates and high life expectancy rates. This is due to an increase in women participating in the workforce, the rising age of marriage and a growing proportion of unmarried women. In an attempt to alleviate a deteriorating pension system, the 2004 reform efforts were directed primarily at two goals, with the first being to cut benefit levels to better reflect the number of those supporting the pension system. The second goal was to slow down the total amounts of benefits paid to extend the pension system's ability to function. Still, the issue of an aging population persists and the ratio of the elderly to the youth will therefore continue to rise, putting into doubt whether the youth will ever receive full benefits.

== Public assistance ==
Japan also has public assistance programs to cover basic living expenses, housing costs, compulsory education and skill training costs, health insurance, and funerals. To apply, people must visit the welfare office of their municipality, which checks their claim and usually gives an answer within two weeks. If a household's total income falls below the minimum living expense set by the health and welfare minister, the household is eligible for welfare benefits. Before their claims are even considered, applicants must first sell off any assets that are deemed unnecessary "luxury items" by caseworkers, though the definition of what constitutes "luxury" items varies among the municipalities, and individual welfare officials have discretion in determining what must be sold off. Generally, cars and motorbikes (unless found to be beneficial in seeking work), as well as items such as high-end televisions, expensive musical instruments, and designer goods must be sold. Although recipients may own real estate if they live on the property, in some cases where the real estate is deemed to have high valued beyond what is necessary, applicants are told to sell their property before they can be eligible for assistance. Once approved for public assistance, recipients must follow the guidance of a caseworker assigned to them in how to spend their money. The public assistance programs benefit about 1.7% of the population. About 50.8% of these households are elderly people, 26.6% were households with sick or disabled members, and 6.2% are single-female-parent families.

Public assistance households (as of March 2016)
Category	Households	%
Elderly	826,656	50.8
Single	747,957	46.0
Others	78,699	4.8
Others	800,263	49.2
Sick or disabled	433,167	26.6
Single-female-parent	100,924	6.2
Others	266,172	16.4
Total	1,626,919	100.0

== Social insurance ==
Companies in Japan are responsible for enrolling their employees in various Social Insurance (社会保険, Shakai Hoken) systems, including health insurance, employee pension, unemployment insurance, and workers' accident compensation insurance. The employer covers all costs for workers' accident compensation insurance, but payments to the other systems are shared by both employer and employee.

=== Healthcare ===
Japan has a universal healthcare system that is administered by the Japanese government. Citizens are required to be enrolled in a public health insurance system plan which vary depending on employment status and/or residency. Failing to enroll when eligible or exiting the public health insurance system penalizes individuals by having them pay two years' worth of premiums in order to be a part of the system. Private health insurance does exist but it is very minor overall.

The three different types of insurances in Japan's health-care system have medical services paid by employees, employers, non-employed, and the government. There is the Society-Managed Health Insurance (SMHI) which is for employees in large firms. This is mainly funded by the premium payments made by the employees and employers with rates between 3–10% of their wages. The Japan Health Insurance Association-Managed Health Insurance (JHIAHI) is for employees within small firms. The government provides 13% of the health payments through subsidies while employees and employers pay 8.2% of their wages. The National Health Insurance (NHI) is the remaining category for self-employed and retired individuals. The premium of the NHI varies because it is based on the income and the number of people insured within the household, but usually it is 2% of the average wage. Due to the number of retired people on NHI, Japan re-implemented co-payments for the elderly in 1983. The co-payments are covered by a general fund that receives its money from other employee insurers.

Japan introduced mandatory public long-term care insurance in April 2000. Municipalities and special wards administer the system. People aged 65 or older may receive services after a care-needs assessment, while insured people aged 40–64 qualify only when their need results from one of 16 specified diseases. Benefits are financed through approximately equal shares of public funding and insurance premiums, and users generally pay 10–30 percent of service costs depending on income.

==== Other aspects of Japan's health care system ====
- Japan's government also controls the retail price of medical equipment in order to lower medical costs on people.
- Japan's health care system does not require patients to see a general practitioner first like other countries. Patients can see a primary care provider or specialist without needing proof of medical necessity and have full insurance coverage for the visit.
- Japan has a second-opinion practice within the healthcare system. A patient will receive a diagnosis from a primary doctor and can then seek another doctor or specialist to receive another. The purpose of this is to provide better quality services to patients and for them to be more informed in their healthcare decisions.

== Minimum wage ==
The Minimum wage law, introduced in 1947 but not enacted until 1959, was designed to protect low-income workers. Minimum wage levels have been determined, according to both region and industry, by special councils composed of government, labor, and employment representatives.

== Gender policy ==
Since the 1980s, the government has established several laws to gradually promote women's social status and gender equality. In 1986, the Equal Employment Opportunity Law was approved, and it reduced barriers for women in business. In 1992, the Child Care Law allowed one of a child's parents to gain up to one year partially paid leave to care for the child. In 1994, the government defined gender equality for the nation: men and women are equal members to participate in any field of society, and both genders are equal in political, economic, social, and cultural benefits with shared responsibility. In 1997, the Nurse Care Insurance Law reduced the stress on women by distributing the cost of caring for the elderly across the whole society. In the same year, Prime Minister Hashimoto Ryotaro recognized gender-equal social policy as an indispensable theme in his speech to the Council for Gender Equality. In 1998, the Law to Promote Specified Nonprofit Activities reduced the restrictions for non-profit feminine groups to acquire legal status. In 1999, the Basic Law for a Gender Equal society passed and the government started to draft the Basic Plan for a Gender-Equal Society, which is updated every five years. Although gender-equal policy is still developing, in the aspect of education it has been quite successful: the college enrollment rate for women in Japan soared from 12 percent in 1980 to 32 percent in 2000, and 46 percent in 2012. However, gender inequality in Japan continues to be evidenced by the absence of women in positions of authority. Because the Japanese welfare system has a close relationship with businesses, both entities must adopt gender-equal practices for Japanese society to achieve gender equality. Pursuit of gender equality is an ongoing effort in Japan.

== Welfare for foreigners ==
Japanese law technically states that only Japanese citizens are eligible to receive public assistance. However, in actual practice, foreign permanent residents with no legal restrictions preventing them from working in Japan are allowed to receive welfare payments. In 2011, this de facto situation was upheld by a Fukuoka High Court decision in favor of a 79-year-old Chinese woman with permanent resident status who had been denied social welfare payments by the Oita city government.

As of 18 July 2014 the Supreme Court of Japan has ruled that foreigners are not entitled to receive welfare payments.

== See also ==
- Ministry of Health, Labour and Welfare
- Health care in Japan
- Social education in Japan
- Elderly people in Japan
- Homelessness in Japan
- Women in Japan
- Welfare capitalism – Form of capitalism
