= Suicide note =

Message left by a person intending to die

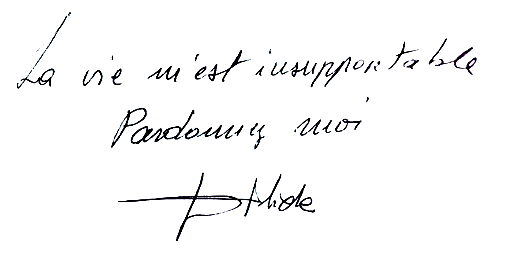
"La vie m'est insupportable. Pardonnez-moi." ('Life is unbearable for me. Forgive me.') – Dalida's suicide note

A suicide note or death note is a message written by a person who intends to die by suicide, often intended to be read afterwards.

A study examining Japanese suicide notes estimated that 25–30% of suicides are accompanied by a note. However, incidence rates may depend on ethnicity and cultural differences, and may reach rates as high as 50% in certain demographics. A suicide message can be in any form or medium, but the most common methods are by a written note, an audio message, or a video.

== Reasons ==
Some fields of study, such as sociology, psychiatry and graphology, have investigated the reasons why people who complete or attempt suicide leave a note.

The most common reasons that people contemplating suicide choose to write a suicide note include one or more of the following:

- To ease the pain of those known to the victim by attempting to dissipate guilt.
- To increase the pain of survivors by attempting to create guilt.
- To set out the reason(s) for suicide.
- To send a message to the world.
- To express thoughts and feelings that the person felt unable to express in life.
- To give instructions for disposal of the remains.
- Occasionally, to confess acts of murder or some other offence.

Sometimes there is also a message in the case of murder–suicide, explaining the reason(s) for the murder(s); see, for example, Marc Lépine's suicide statement and videotaped statements of the 7 July 2005 London bombers.

== See also ==
- Death poem – Genre of poetry
- Deathbed confession – Confession made by someone nearing death
- Last words – Final words attributed to a person before their death
- Will and testament – Legal declaration where a person distributes property at death
