= Chint Group =

Chinese electrical equipment company

CHINT Group Co., Ltd.
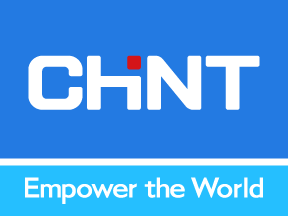
- Trade name: Chint
- Native name: 正泰集团股份有限公司
- Company type: Private
- Traded as: SSE: 601877 (Chint Electric)
- Industry: Electrical equipment; Photovoltaics
- Founded: 1984; 42 years ago
- Founder: Nan Cunhui
- Headquarters: Yueqing, Zhejiang, China
- Key people: Nan Cunhui (Chairman)
- Revenue: ▲US$22.1 billion (2024)
- Total assets: ▲US$24.3 billion (2024)
- Number of employees: 50,000+ (2024)
- Website: chintglobal.com

CHINT Group Co., Ltd. (Chint; Chinese: 正泰集团; pinyin: Zhèngtài Jítuán) is a Chinese holding company that focuses on low-voltage electrical appliances and photovoltaic products.

Its electrical appliance subsidiary is named Chint Electric and is currently listed on the Shanghai Stock Exchange.

== Background ==
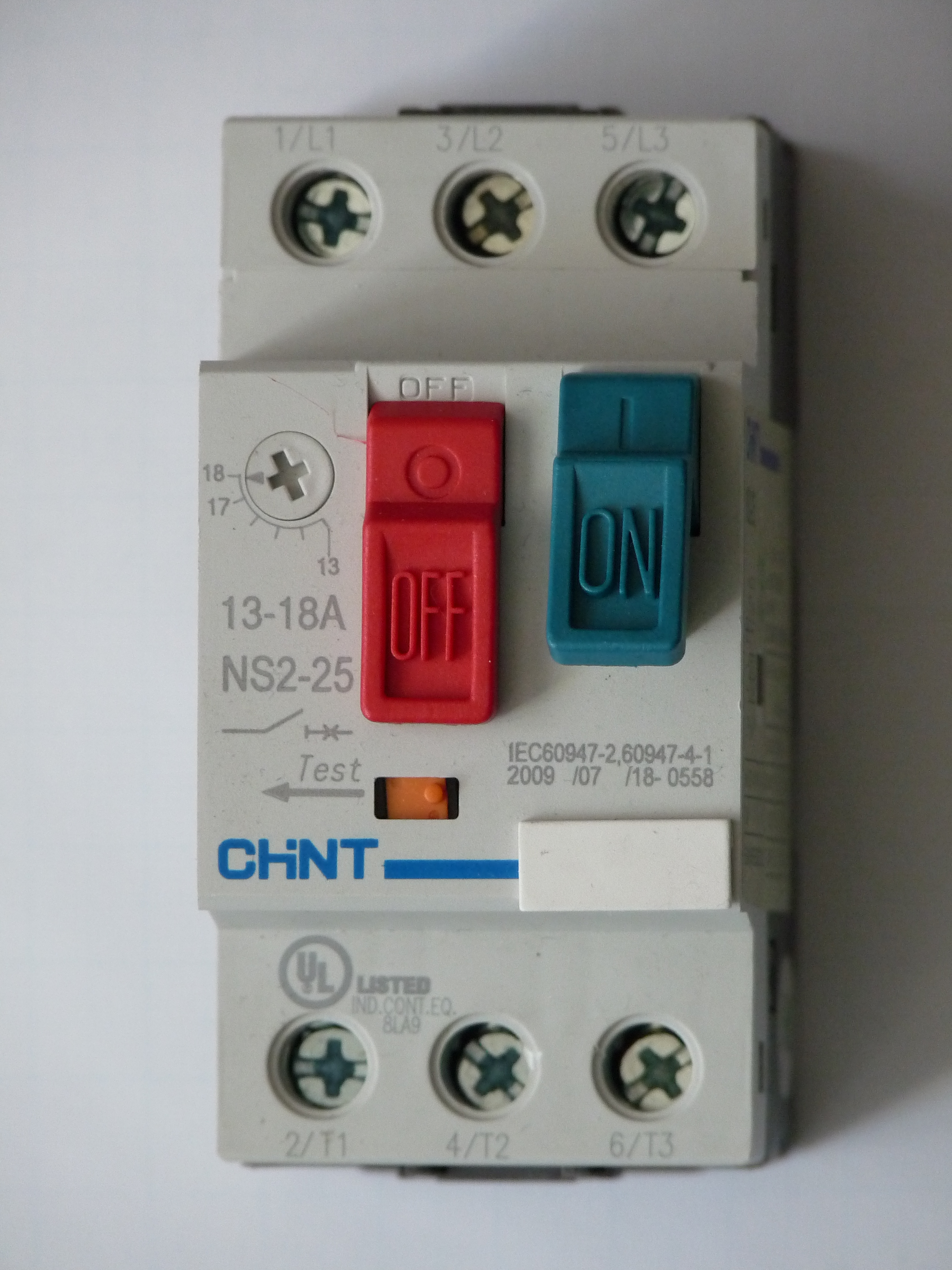
Motor protective circuit breaker

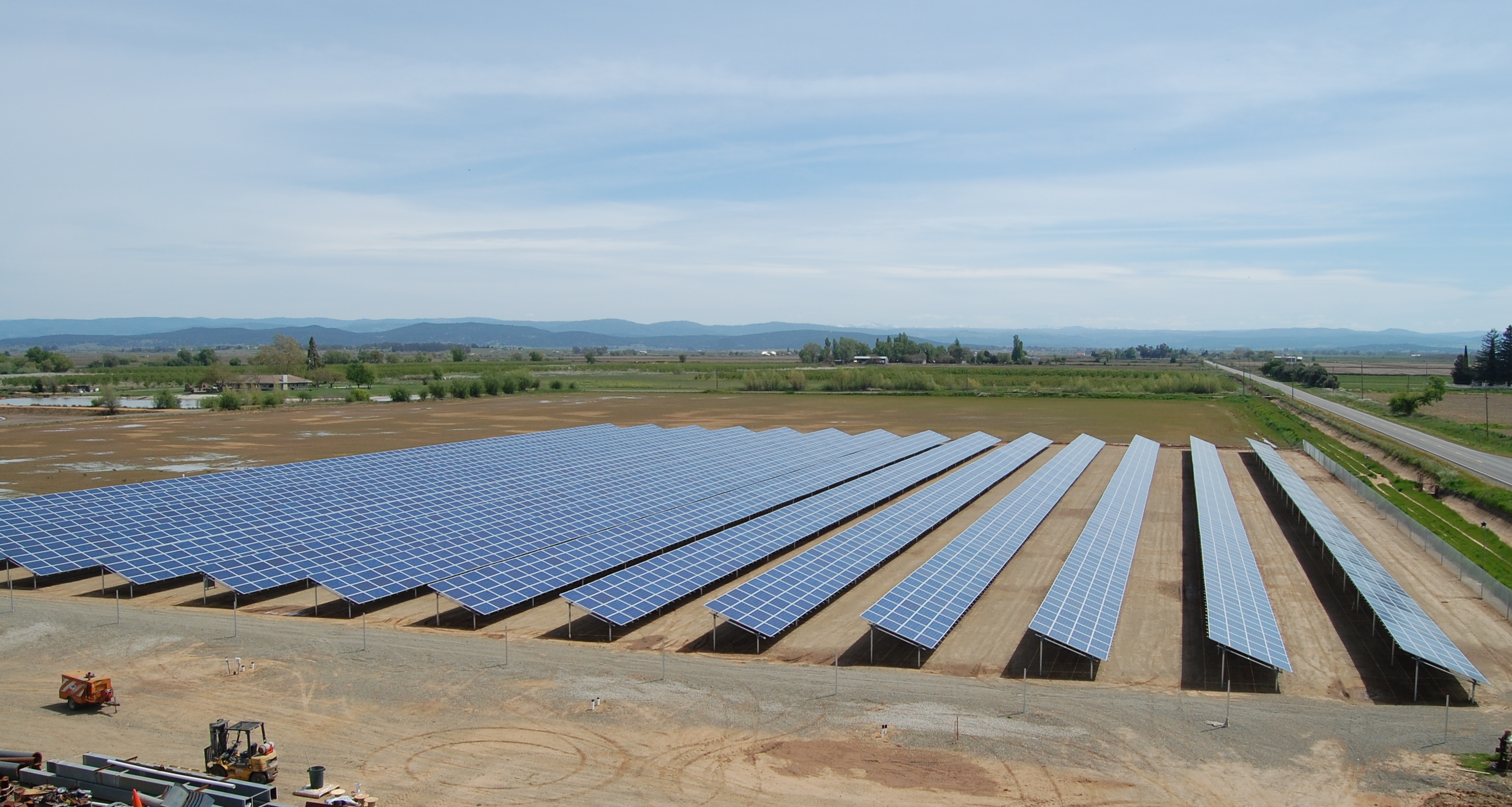
Astronergy solar panels in California

Chint was founded in 1984 by Nan Cunhui when he was 21 years old with five friends. They pooled 50,000 yuan in investment capital using earnings from shoe-repair work.It began as Yueqing Switch Factory.

In 1991, the factory was restructured into a joint-stock company. With foreign investment and advanced technology and equipment, Nan established the Sino-US joint venture Chint Electric, which later became Chint Group.

In July 2001, Jiang Zemin decreed that private businessmen could join the Chinese Communist Party (CCP). Nan was rejected twice from joining before being accepted to become a deputy at the National People's Congress. Nan encouraged Chint employees to join the CCP and in 2002, the company had 262 party members. Chint was seen to be well connected to the Chinese government with its customers including the Three Gorges Dam, Baosteel; Beijing Airport, China Central Television and a string of provincial governments. Chint was the first private company in Zhejiang to provide pension insurance for its workers and also provided better pay and benefits. In 2004, 60,000 visitors went to Chints factory in Wenzhou with most being provincial government officials who came to see how the private economy in China can operate.

In 2006, Chint entered the photovoltaic energy field.

In 2007, Chint sued Schneider Electric for patent infringement. In April 2009, Schneider Electric agreed to pay $23m to settle which at the time was the largest recorded settlement in an intellectual property case in China.

In 2010, Chint electric was listed on the Shanghai Stock Exchange.

Chint was one of the main sponsors involved in the creation of Wenzhou Minshang Bank, the first private bank in China. Nan would become its chairman. The bank started operations in March 2015.

By May 2024, Chint had expanded its business operations outside China covering over 100 countries and regions. Overseas business accounted for 30% of total revenue.

As of 2025, photovoltaic power stations have been a rapid growth point for Chint in recent years.

== See also ==
- Shanghai Electric
- Sungrow
- Solar power in China
