= Social Security =

Social security may refer to:

- Social security, the general notion of a society ensuring basic needs are met
- Social Security System (Philippines)
- South African Social Security Agency, an agency of the South African government
- Social Security (United States), the United States retirement and disability program
- Social Security Organization, a social insurer organization in Iran
- Social Security (play), a play by Andrew Bergman

== See also ==
- Department of Social Security (disambiguation)
- National pension (disambiguation)
