= Health in Japan =

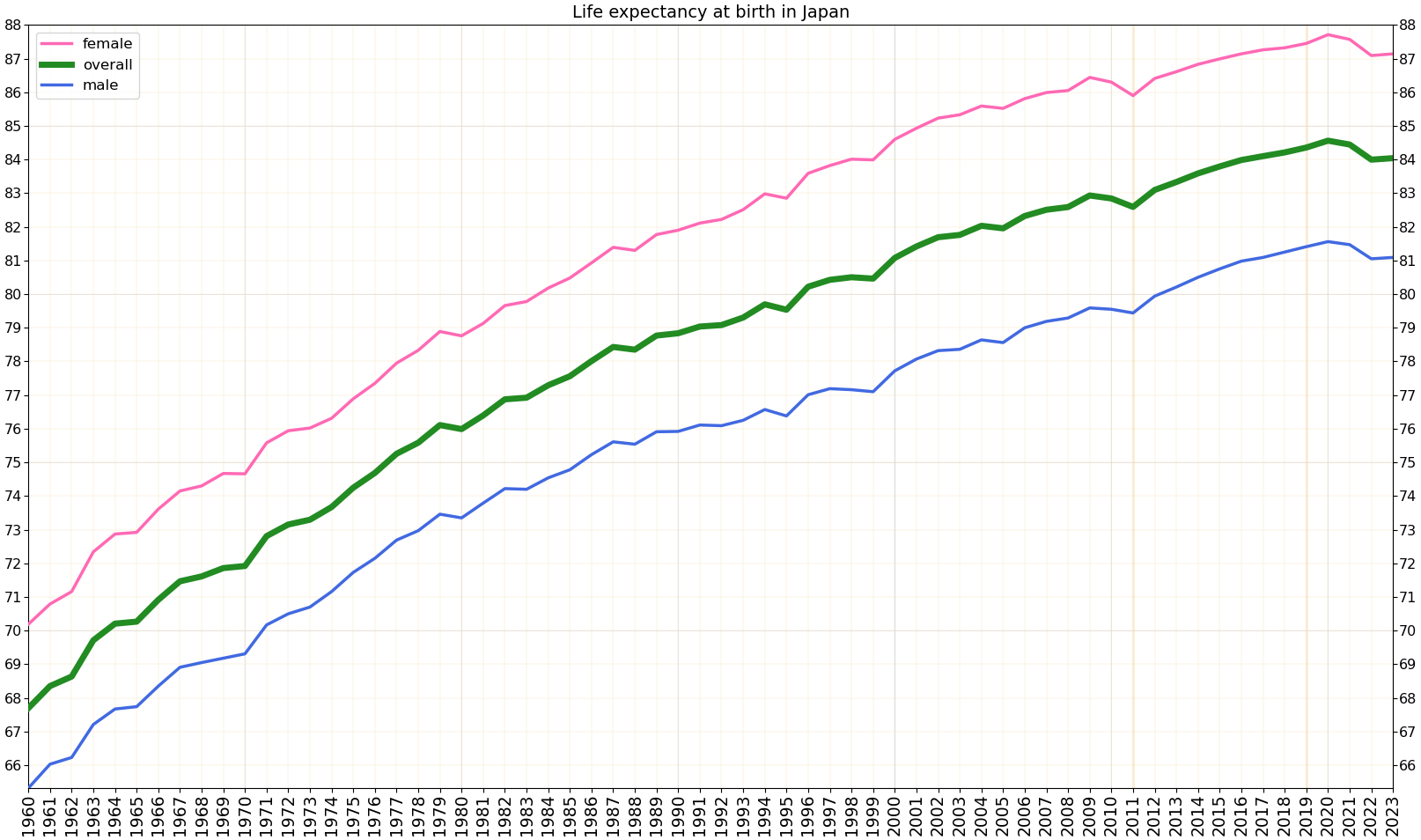
Life expectancy in Japan, 1960 to 2023

The level of health in Japan is due to a number of factors including cultural habits, isolation, and a universal health care system. John Creighton Campbell, a professor at the University of Michigan and Tokyo University, told the New York Times in 2009 that Japanese people are the healthiest group on the planet. Japanese visit a doctor nearly 14 times a year, more than four times as often as Americans. Life expectancy in 2013 was 83.3 years - among the highest on the planet.

In 2018, a new measure of expected human capital was calculated for 195 countries from 1990 to 2016, and defined for each birth cohort, as the expected years lived from age 20 to 64 years and adjusted for educational attainment, learning or education quality, and functional health status. Japan had the highest level of expected human capital among the 20 largest countries: 24.1 health, education, and learning-adjusted expected years lived between age 20 and 64 years.

== Chronic illness ==
Obesity in Japan in 2014 was about 3.3%, presumably because of the Japanese diet and physiology. In 2015, Japan had the lowest rate of heart disease in the OECD, and the lowest level of dementia in the developed world.

== Suicide problem ==
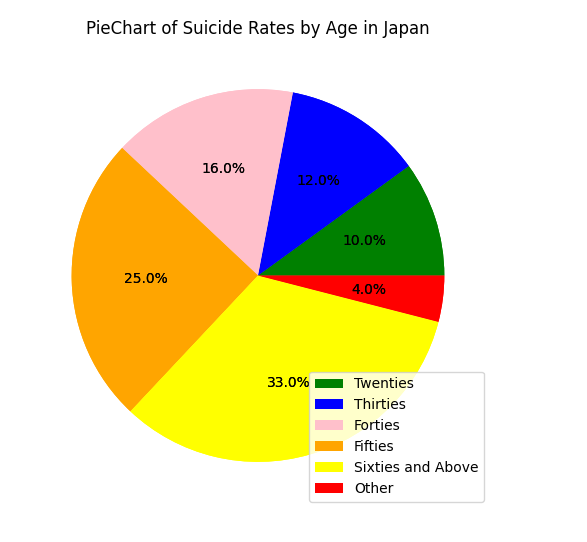
Suicides in Japan by age group, 2003

Japan's suicide rate is high. According to Mark D. West's systematic review Law in Everyday Japan: Sex, Sumo, Suicide, and Statutes, suicide rates have been at an elevated rate in Japan for 12 decades. In 1998, the suicide rate became more alarming as it increased, and it did not notably decrease until 2011.

The Yomiuri Shimbun reported in June 2008 that more than 30,000 people had killed themselves every year for the past decade, and the suicide count remained over 30,000 for the 14th year running in 2011. A 2006 study suspects that health problems were a factor in almost 50 percent of Japan's suicides in 2006. The Yomiuri's 2007 figures show 274 school children were among those who took their own lives, in which bullying was often a contributing factor.

There are many factors to consider, but suicide rates overall appear to increase with age, as seen in the figure in this section. As of 2003, suicides of people in their twenties made up about ten percent, those in their thirties made up about twelve percent, those in their forties made up about sixteen percent, those in their fifties made up about twenty-five percent, and those in their sixties or older made up about thirty-three percent.

Although suicide is a priority health issue, Japanese culture views the act as something different than morally wrong and unacceptable. According to Young's 2002 article, traditional Japanese culture accepts suicide as a positive moral act characterizing the person's sense of moral duty to others which is driven by social context. Given that Japan is a collectivistic culture, moral duty to other members of society is important. Each individual is viewed as a part of the bigger group; everyone is considered a member of the group rather than as separated individuals. When a member feels that sacrificing their self would be best for the group as a whole, they are compelled to consider suicide as a viable option - they may believe that self-sacrifice is moral duty to the group. This is likely a part of the problem in trying to reduce the suicide rate. There is difficulty for psychiatrists and other mental health professionals in Japan to reduce the suicide rate when the act of suicide is, given the right circumstances, a completely rational and moral decision.

== Smoking ==
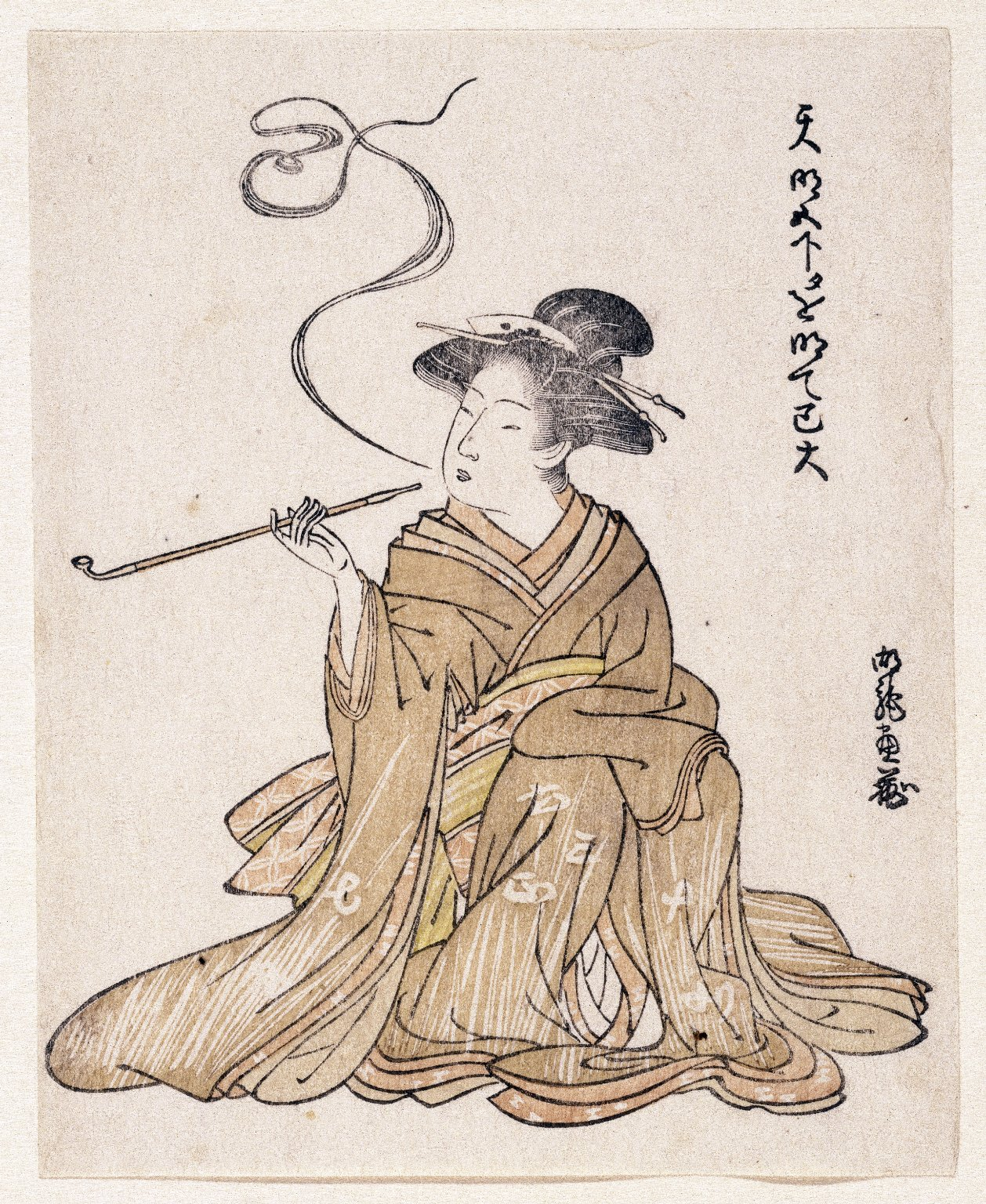
E-Goyomi (Lady Smoking) woodblock print dating between 1700 and 1800

Smoking is one of the biggest public health issues in Japan. In 2008, smoking was killing more than 100,000 people per year, and was responsible for one in ten deaths.

== Alcohol and health issues ==
A team led by Professor Osaki of Tottori University estimated the social cost of excessive drinking in Japan to be 4.15 trillion yen a year.

== Access to care ==
In Japan, services are provided either through regional/national public hospitals or through private hospitals/clinics, and patients have universal access to any facility, though hospitals tend to charge higher for those without a referral. Space can be an issue in some regions. More than 14,000 emergency patients were rejected at least three times by Japanese hospitals before getting treatment in 2007, according to the latest government survey. In the worst case, a woman in her 70s with a breathing problem was rejected 49 times in Tokyo.

Public health insurance covers most citizens/residents and pays 70% or more cost for each care and each prescribed drug. Patients are responsible for the remainder (upper limits apply). The monthly insurance premium is 0–50,000 JPY per household, scaled to annual income. Supplementary private health insurance is available only to cover the co-payments or non-covered costs, and usually makes a fixed payment per days in a hospital or per surgery performed, rather than per actual expenditure. In 2005, Japan spent 8.2% of GDP on health care or US$2,908 per capita. Of that, approximately 83% was government expenditure.

== Cultural influences ==
Traditional Chinese medicine was introduced to Japan with other elements of Chinese culture during the 5th to 9th century. Since around 1900, Chinese-style herbalists have been required to be licensed medical doctors. Training was professionalized and, except for East Asian healers, was based on a biomedical model of the disease.

The practice of biomedicine was also influenced by Japanese social organization and cultural expectations concerning education, the organization of the workplace, and social relations of status and dependency, decision-making styles, and ideas about the human body, causes of illness, gender, individualism, and privacy. Anthropologist Emiko Ohnuki-Tierney notes that "daily hygienic behavior and its underlying concepts, which are perceived and expressed in terms of biomedical germ theory, in fact, are directly tied to the basic Japanese symbolic structure."

Western medicine was introduced to Japan with the Rangaku studies during the Edo period. A number of books on pharmacology and anatomy were translated from Dutch and Latin to Japanese. During the Meiji period in the late 19th century, the Japanese health care system was modeled after the model of Western biomedicine. At that time, western doctors came to Japan to create medical faculties at the newly built Japanese universities, and students also went abroad. Innovations like vaccines were introduced to Japan, improving average life expectancy.

From the Meiji period to the end of World War II, German was a mandatory foreign language for Japanese students of medicine. Patient charts in Japanese teaching hospitals were written in German.

Today, a person who becomes ill in Japan has a number of alternative options. One may visit a priest, or send a family member in his or her place. There are numerous folk remedies, including hot springs baths (onsen) and chemical and herbal over-the-counter medications. A person may seek the assistance of traditional healers, such as herbalists, masseurs, and acupuncturists.

== AIDS ==
Although the number of AIDS cases remained small by international standards, public health officials were concerned in the late 1980s about the worldwide epidemic of acquired immune deficiency syndrome (AIDS). The first confirmed case of AIDS in Japan was reported in 1985. By 1991 there were 553 reported cases, and by April 1992 the number had risen to 2,077. While frightened by the deadliness of the disease yet sympathetic to the plight of hemophiliac AIDS patients, most Japanese are unconcerned with contracting AIDS themselves.

Various levels of government responded to the introduction of AIDS awareness into the heterosexual population by establishing government committees, mandating AIDS education, and advising testing for the general public without targeting special groups. A fund, underwritten by pharmaceutical companies that distributed imported blood products, was established in 1988 to provide financial compensation for AIDS patients.

== Environment and disease ==
=== Climate change ===
The climate and weather patterns in Japan have undergone changes that have led to an increase in mean temperature. As a result, vulnerable populations such as the elderly are at high risk due to the intensity of heat waves and heat stress. The rise in temperatures is anticipated to enable the transmission of diseases throughout Japan, including vector-borne illnesses like dengue, which tend to thrive in warmer climates.

== See also ==
- 2009 flu pandemic in Japan
- Aging of Japan
- Erwin Bälz—an oyatoi gaikokujin and cofounder of modern medicine in Japan
- Health care compared—tabular comparisons with the U.S., Canada, and other countries not shown above.
- Health care system in Japan
- Hikikomori
- Public health centres in Japan
- Radiation effects from Fukushima Daiichi nuclear disaster
- Social welfare in Japan
