= National pension =

National pension may refer to:

- A pension system of a nation
- National Pension (Japan)
- National Pension Service of South Korea
- National Pension System of India

== See also ==
- Social Security (disambiguation)
