= Health care system in Japan =

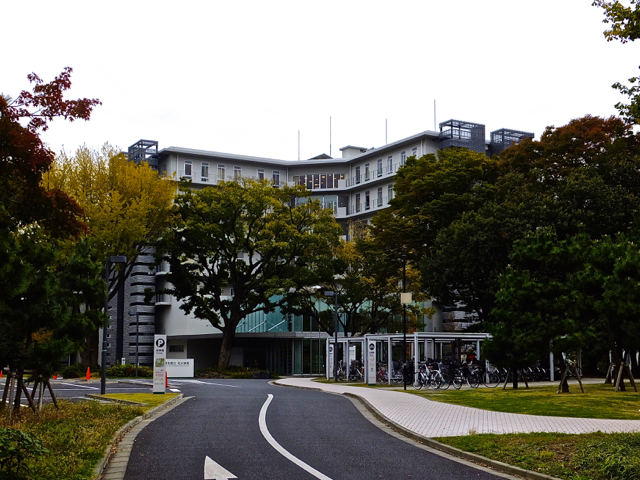
Tokyo Metropolitan Matsuzawa Hospital

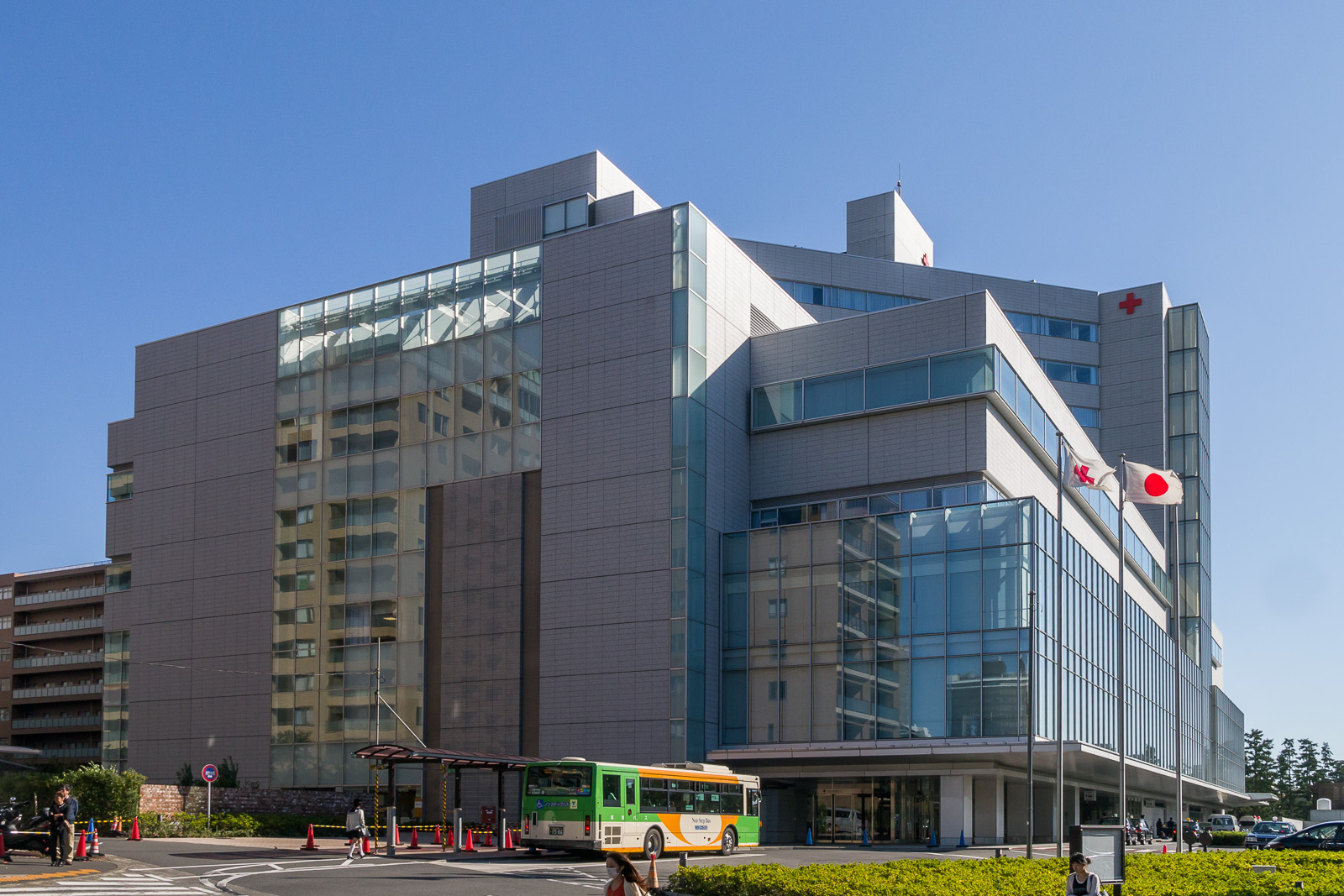
Japanese Red Cross Medical Center in Hiroo, Shibuya

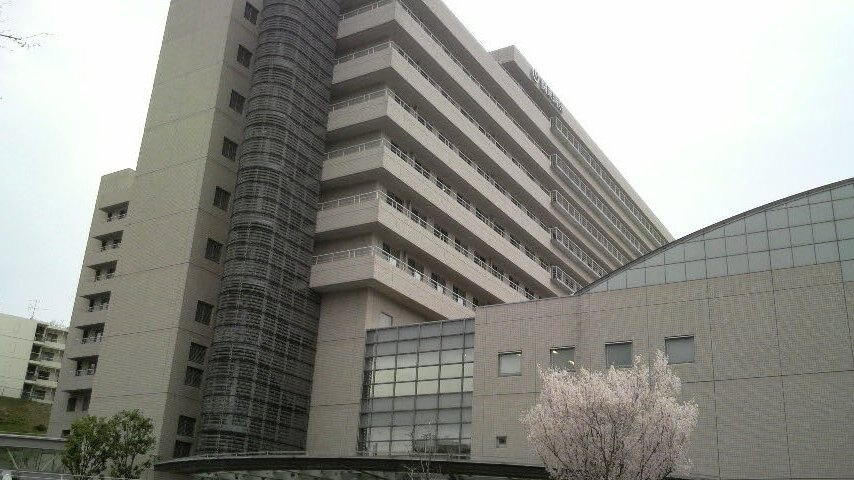
NTT Medical Center in Tokyo

The health care system in Japan provides different types of services, including screening examinations, prenatal care and infectious disease control, with the patient accepting responsibility for 30% of these costs while the government pays the remaining 70%. Payment for personal medical services is offered by a universal health care insurance system that provides relative equality of access, with fees set by a government committee. All residents of Japan are required by the law to have health insurance coverage. People without employer insurance; insurance provided by the employer, where premiums are split between the employer and employee, can participate in a national health insurance program, administered by local governments. Patients are free to select physicians or facilities of their choice and cannot be denied coverage.

Medical fees are strictly regulated by the government to keep them affordable. Depending on the family's income and the age of the insured, patients are responsible for paying 10%, 20%, or 30% of medical fees, with the government paying the remaining fee. Also, monthly thresholds are set for each household, again depending on income and age, and medical fees exceeding the threshold are waived or reimbursed by the government.

Uninsured patients are responsible for paying 100% of their medical fees, but fees are waived for low-income households receiving a government subsidy.

== History ==
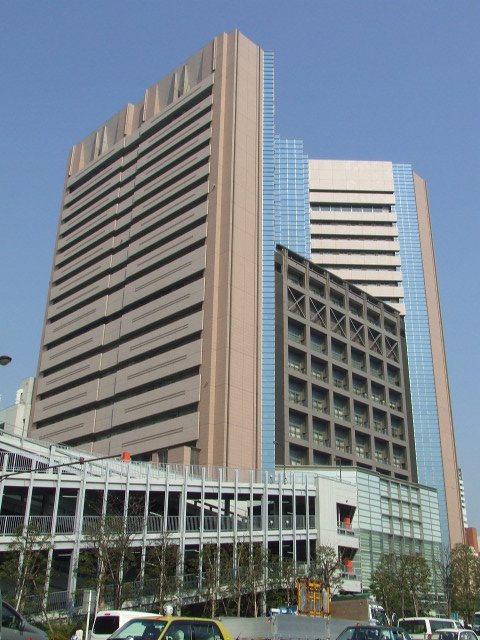
Cancer Center Hospital in the Tsukiji district of Tokyo

The modern Japanese health care system started to develop just after the Meiji Restoration with the introduction of Western medicine. Statutory insurance, however, was not established until 1927 when the first employee health insurance plan was created.

In 1961, Japan achieved universal health insurance coverage, and almost everyone became insured. However, the copayment rates differed greatly. While those who enrolled in employees' health insurance needed to pay only a nominal amount at the first physician visit, their dependents and those who enrolled in National Health Insurance had to pay 50% of the fee schedule price for all services and medications. From 1961 to 1982, the copayment rate was gradually lowered to 30%.

In 1982, the Health and Medical Service Law for the Elderly created a system for sharing older patients’ medical costs among health-insurance programs and introduced patient cost-sharing; it took effect in 1983.

In the late 1980s, government and professional circles were considering changing the system so that primary, secondary, and tertiary levels of care would be clearly distinguished within each geographical region. Further, facilities would be designated by level of care and referrals would be required to obtain more complex care. Policymakers and administrators also recognized the need to unify the various insurance systems and control costs.

By the early 1990s, there were more than 1,000 mental hospitals, 8,700 general hospitals, and 1,000 comprehensive hospitals with a total capacity of 1.5 million beds. Hospitals provide both out-patient and in-patient care. In addition, 79,000 clinics offered primarily out-patient services, and there were 48,000 dental clinics. Most physicians and hospitals sold medication directly to patients, but there were 36,000 pharmacies where patients could purchase synthetic or herbal medication. Around the same time, there were nearly 191,400 physicians, 66,800 dentists, and 333,000 nurses, plus more than 200,000 people licensed to practice massage, acupuncture, moxibustion, and other East Asian therapeutic methods.

== Cost ==
Healthcare financing of Japan (2010)
Public; 14,256B JPY(38.1%)	Government	9,703B JPY (25.9%)
Public; 14,256B JPY(38.1%)	Municipalities	4,552B JPY (12.2%)
Social Insurance; 18,1319B JPY (48.5%)	Employer	7,538B JPY (20.1%)
Social Insurance; 18,1319B JPY (48.5%)	Employee	10,5939B JPY (28.3%)
Out-of-pocket		4,757B JPY (12.7%)
etc.		274B JPY (0.7%)
Total		JPY 37,420B

Social expenditure of Japan

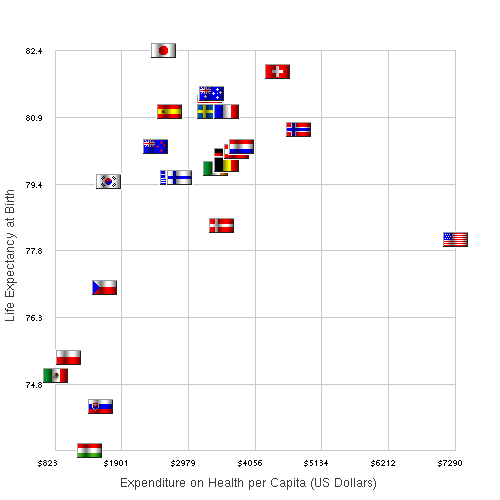
Comparison of healthcare spending and life expectancy for some countries in 2007

In 2008, Japan spent about 8.2% of the nation's gross domestic product (GDP), or US$2,859.7 or 405,737.84 Yen per capita, on health, ranking 20th among the Organization for Economic Cooperation and Development (OECD) countries. The share of gross domestic product was the same as the average of OECD states in 2008. According to 2018 data, share of gross domestic products rose to 10.9% of GDP, overtaking the OECD average of 8.8%.

The government has controlled costs over decades using the national uniform fee schedule for reimbursement. The government is also able to reduce fees when the economy stagnates. In the 1980s, health care spending was rapidly increasing as was the case with many industrialized nations. While some countries like the U.S. allowed costs to rise, Japan tightly regulated the health industry to rein in costs. Fees for all health care services are set every two years by negotiations between the health ministry and physicians. The negotiations determine the fee for every medical procedure and medication, and fees are identical across the country. If physicians attempt to game the system by ordering more procedures to generate income, the government may lower the fees for those procedures at the next round of fee setting. This was the case when the fee for an MRI was lowered by 35% in 2002 by the government. Thus, as of 2009, in the U.S. an MRI of the neck region could cost $1,500, but in Japan, it cost US$98. Once a patient's monthly copayment reaches a cap, no further copayment is required. The threshold for the monthly copayment amount is tiered into three levels according to income and age.

To cut costs, Japan uses generic drugs. As of 2010, Japan had a goal of adding more drugs to the nation's National Health Insurance listing. Age-related conditions remain one of the biggest concerns. Pharmaceutical companies focus on marketing and research toward that part of the population.

== Provision ==
Development of life expectancy in Japan

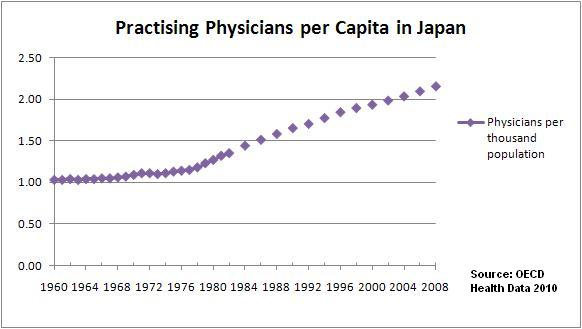
Practising physicians per capita from 1960 to 2008

People in Japan have the longest life expectancy at birth of those in any country in the world. Life expectancy at birth was 83 years in 2009 (male 79.6 years, female 86.4 years). This was achieved in a fairly short time through a rapid reduction in mortality rates secondary to communicable diseases from the 1950s to the early 1960s, followed by a large reduction in stroke mortality rates after the mid-60s.

In 2008 the number of acute care beds per 1000 total population was 8.1, which was higher than in other OECD countries such as the U.S. (2.7). Comparisons based on this number may be difficult to make, however, since 34% of patients were admitted to hospitals for longer than 30 days even in beds that were classified as acute care. Staffing per bed is very low. There are four times more MRI scanners per head, and six times the number of CT scanners, compared with the average European provision. The average patient visits a doctor 12.1 times a year - almost double the average for OECD countries.

In 2008 per 1000 population, the number of practising physicians was 2.2, which was almost the same as that in the U.S. (2.4). The number of practising nurses was 9.5, which was a little lower than that in U.S. (10.8), and almost the same as that in UK (9.5) or in Canada (9.2). Physicians and nurses are licensed for life with no requirement for license renewal, continuing medical or nursing education, and no peer or utilization review. OECD data lists specialists and generalists together for Japan because these two are not officially differentiated. Traditionally, physicians have been trained to become subspecialists, but once they have completed their training, only a few have continued to practice as subspecialists. The rest have left the large hospitals to practice in small community hospitals or open their clinics without any formal retraining as general practitioners. Unlike many countries, there is no system of general practitioners in Japan, instead, patients go straight to specialists, often working in clinics.

=== Quality ===
Japanese outcomes for high-level medical treatment of physical health are generally competitive with those of the US. A comparison of two reports in the New England Journal of Medicine by MacDonald et al. (2001) and Sakuramoto et al.(2007) suggest that outcomes for gastro-esophageal cancer is better in Japan than the US in both patients treated with surgery alone and surgery followed by chemotherapy. Japan excels in the five-year survival rates of colon cancer, lung cancer, pancreatic cancer and liver cancer based on the comparison of a report by the American Association of Oncology and another report by the Japan Foundation for the Promotion of Cancer Research. The same comparison shows that the US excels in the five-year survival of rectal cancer, breast cancer, prostate cancer and malignant lymphoma. Surgical outcomes tend to be better in Japan for most cancers while overall survival tends to be longer in the US due to the more aggressive use of chemotherapy in late-stage cancers. A comparison of the data from the United States Renal Data System (USRDS) 2009 and Japan Renology Society 2009 shows that the annual mortality of patients undergoing dialysis in Japan is 13% compared to 22.4% in the US. Five-year survival of patients under dialysis is 59.9% in Japan and 38% in the US.

In an article titled "Does Japanese Coronary Artery Bypass Grafting Qualify as a Global Leader?" Masami Ochi of Nippon Medical School points out that Japanese coronary bypass surgeries surpass those of other countries in multiple criteria. According to the International Association of Heart and Lung Transplantation, the five-year survival of heart transplant recipients around the world who had their heart transplants between 1992 and 2009 was 71.9% (ISHLT 2011.6) while the five-year survival of Japanese heart transplant recipients is 96.2% according to a report by Osaka University. However, only 120 heart transplants have been performed domestically by 2011 due to a lack of donors.

In contrast to physical health care, the quality of mental health care in Japan is relatively low compared to most other developed countries. Despite reforms, Japan's psychiatric hospitals continue to largely rely on outdated methods of patient control, with their rates of compulsory medication, isolation (solitary confinement) and physical restraints (tying patients to beds) much higher than in other countries. High levels of deep vein thrombosis have been found in restrained patients in Japan, which can lead to disability and death. Rather than decreasing the use of restraints as has been done in many other countries, the incidence of use of medical restraints in Japanese hospitals doubled in the nearly ten years from 2003 (5,109 restrained patients) through 2014 (10,682).

The 47 local government prefectures have some responsibility for overseeing the quality of health care, but there is no systematic collection of treatment or outcome data. They oversee annual hospital inspections. The Japan Council for Quality Health Care accredits about 25% of hospitals. One problem with the quality of Japanese medical care is the lack of transparency when medical errors occur. In 2015 Japan introduced a law to require hospitals to conduct reviews of patient care for any unexpected deaths and to provide the reports to the next of kin and a third party organization. However, it is up to the hospital to decide whether the death was unexpected. Neither patients nor the patients' families are allowed to request reviews, which makes the system ineffective. Meanwhile, Japanese healthcare providers are reluctant to provide open information because Japanese medical journalists tend to embellish, sensationalize, and in some cases fabricate anti-medical criticisms with little recourse for medical providers to correct the false claims once they have been made. However, the increased number of hospital visits per capita compared to other nations and the generally good overall outcome suggests the rate of adverse medical events are not higher than in other countries.

Around 92% of hospitals in Japan have an insufficient number of doctors while having sufficient nurses, while only 10% of hospitals have a sufficient number of doctors and an insufficient number of nurses. Another problem has been an uneven distribution of health personnel, with rural areas favoured over cities.

A no-fault approach to cases of children born with cerebral palsy was introduced in 2009. This led to reduced litigation and 25% fewer children born with the condition.

== Access ==
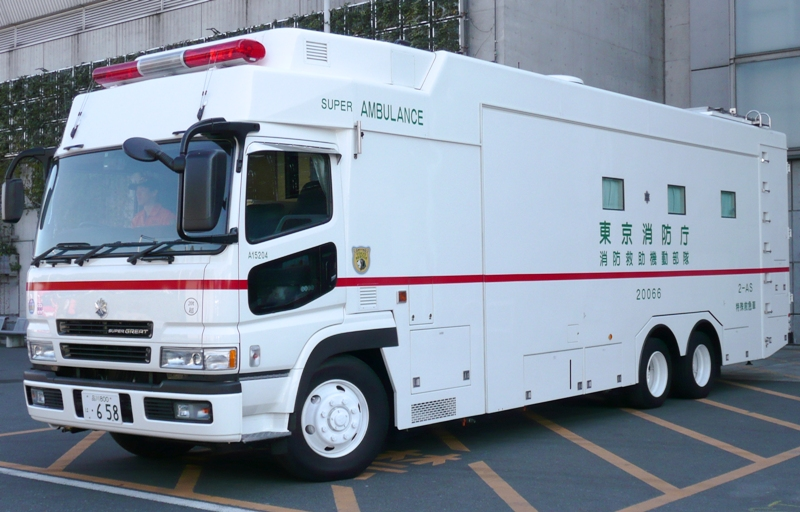
Japanese Super Ambulance, Tokyo Fire Department

In Japan, services are provided either through regional/national public hospitals or through private hospitals/clinics, and patients have universal access to any facility, though hospitals tend to charge more to those patients without a referral. As mentioned above, costs in Japan tend to be quite low compared to those in other developed countries, but utilization rates are much higher. Most one-doctor clinics do not require reservations and same-day appointments are the rule rather than the exception. Japanese patients favour medical technology such as CT scans and MRIs, and they receive MRIs at a per capita rate 8 times higher than the British and twice as high as Americans. In most cases, CT scans, MRIs and many other tests do not require waiting periods. Japan has about three times as many hospitals per capita as the US and, on average, Japanese people visit the hospital more than four times as often as the average American.

Access to medical facilities is sometimes abused. Some patients with mild illnesses tend to go straight to the hospital emergency departments rather than accessing more appropriate primary care services. This causes a delay in helping people who have more urgent and severe conditions who need to be treated in the hospital environment. There is also a problem with misuse of ambulance services, with many people taking ambulances to hospitals with minor issues not requiring an ambulance. In turn, this causes delays for ambulances arriving for serious emergencies. Nearly 50% of the ambulance rides in 2014 were minor conditions where citizens could have taken a taxi instead of an ambulance to get treated.

Due to the issue of large numbers of people visiting hospitals for relatively minor problems, a shortage of medical resources can be an issue in some regions. The problem has become a wide concern in Japan, particularly in Tokyo. A report has shown that more than 14,000 emergency patients were rejected at least three times by hospitals in Japan before getting treatment. A government survey for 2007, which got a lot of attention when it was released in 2009, cited several such incidents in the Tokyo area, including the case of an elderly man who was turned away by 14 hospitals before dying 90 minutes after being finally admitted, and that of a pregnant woman complaining of a severe headache being refused admission to seven Tokyo hospitals and later dying of an undiagnosed brain hemorrhage after giving birth. The problem of ambulances being rejected by multiple hospitals has been named "tarai mawashi" (a traditional acrobatic act where a wash basin is juggled between the feet) and has been attributed to several factors such as medical reimbursements set so low that hospitals need to maintain very high occupancy rates to stay solvent, hospital stays being cheaper for the patient than low-cost hotels, the shortage of specialist doctors and low-risk patients with minimal need for treatment flooding the system.

== Insurance ==
Health insurance is, in principle, mandatory for residents of Japan, but there is no penalty for the 10% of individuals who choose not to comply, making it optional in practice. Apart from conventional Western medicine and healthcare, Japanese insurance also covers traditional health therapies like acupuncture and health massages, etc., from licensed therapists. There is a total of eight health insurance systems in Japan, with around 3,500 health insurers. According to Mark Britnell, it is widely recognised that there are too many small insurers. They can be divided into two categories, Employees' Health Insurance (健康保険, Kenkō-Hoken) and National Health Insurance (国民健康保険, Kokumin-Kenkō-Hoken). Employees’ Health Insurance is broken down into the following systems:

- Union Managed Health Insurance
- Government Managed Health Insurance
- Seaman's Insurance
- National Public Workers Mutual Aid Association Insurance
- Local Public Workers Mutual Aid Association Insurance
- Private School Teachers’ and Employees’ Mutual Aid Association Insurance

National Health Insurance is generally reserved for self-employed people and students, and social insurance is normally for corporate employees. National Health Insurance has two categories:

- National Health Insurance for each city, town or village
- National Health Insurance Union

Public health insurance covers most citizens/residents and the system pays 70% or more of medical and prescription drug costs with the remainder being covered by the patient (upper limits apply). The monthly insurance premium is paid per household and scaled to annual income. Supplementary private health insurance is available only to cover the co-payments or non-covered costs and has a fixed payment per day in hospital or per surgery performed, rather than per actual expenditure.

There is a separate system of insurance - Kaigo-Hoken (介護保険) - for long-term care, run by the municipal governments. People over 40 have contributions of around 2% of their income.

Insurance for individuals is paid for by both employees and employers. This ends up accounting for 95% of the coverage for individuals. Patients in Japan must pay 30% of medical costs. If there is a need to pay a much higher cost, they get reimbursed up to 80-90%. Seniors who are covered by SHSS (senior insurance) only pay 10% out of pocket. As of 2016, healthcare providers spend billions on inpatient care and outpatient care. 152 billion is spent on inpatient care while 147 billion is spent on outpatient care. As far as the long term goes, 41 billion is spent.

Today, Japan has the severe problem of paying for rising medical costs, benefits that are not equal from one person to another and even burdens on each of the nation's health insurance programs. One of the ways Japan has improved its healthcare more recently is by passing the Industrial Competitiveness Enhancement Action Plan. The goal is to help prevent diseases so people live longer. If preventable diseases are prevented, Japan will not have to spend as much on other costs. The action plan also provides a higher quality of medical and health care.

== See also ==
- Health in Japan
- Aging of Japan
- Birth in Japan
- Hikikomori
- Suicide in Japan
- Erwin Bälz—a foreign government advisor and cofounder of modern medicine in Japan
- Health care compared—tabular comparisons with the U.S., Canada, and other countries not shown above
- List of hospitals in Japan
- Public health centres in Japan
- Social welfare in Japan
