= 1971 Saga gubernatorial election =

Election for Governor of Saga Prefecture

← 1967	11 April 1971	1975 →
Nominee	Sunao Ikeda	Kōzō Eguchi
Party	Independent	JCP
Popular vote	362,563	66,313
Governor before election
Sunao Ikeda
Independent
Elected Governor
Sunao Ikeda
Independent

A gubernatorial election was held on 11 April 1971 to elect the Governor of Saga Prefecture. Incumbent Sunao Ikeda scored a second victory over communist candidate Kōzō Eguchi.

== Candidates ==
- Sunao Ikeda - incumbent Governor of Saga Prefecture, age 69
- Kōzō Eguchi (江口子午三, Eguchi Kōzō) - candidate in the 1967 Saga gubernatorial election and three-time House of Councillors candidate, age 62

== Results ==
Saga Gubernatorial Election 1971
Party	Candidate	Votes	%	±%
Independent	Sunao Ikeda (incumbent)	362,563		
JCP	Kōzō Eguchi	66,313		
