= Obesity in Japan =

Obesity in Japan is a major public health concern domestically, but it also has an international reputation of having the lowest rates among high-income countries: writer Johann Hari described Japan as "the land that doesn't need Ozempic" in 2024.

While the threshold for obesity is a BMI of 30 in most areas, obesity is defined in Japan as having a BMI that exceeds 25: this was due to the former figure, recommended by the World Health Organization (WHO) in 1997, having been challenged by Japanese doctors due to it being unable to explain an increase in obesity-related conditions between 1952 and 1999 despite the percentage of individuals with BMIs over 30 only increasing by less than three percent. As such, in 2000, the aforementioned standards were designed by the Japan Society for the Study of Obesity (JASSO) to reflect these observations. Additionally, while obesity itself is considered a disease by the WHO, JASSO distinguishes between obesity and "obesity disease," primarily to distinguish patients who require weight reduction for medical reasons.

Clinical treatment of chronic obesity is hindered due to widespread misconceptions and stigma regarding those with the condition: a study conducted in 2018 found that 81% of Japanese people with obesity believed that losing the required weight was their own responsibility, and less than 20% believed that health professionals had a role to play in the treatment.

== Prevalence ==
The Ministry of Health, Labour and Welfare published the following statistics in 2024 from the National Health and Nutrition Survey 2019.

Group	"low weight" (BMI <18.5)	"normal weight"	"obese" (BMI >25)**
Male, 15-19	16.3%	78.3%	5.4%
Male, 20-29	6.7%	70.1%	23.1%
Male, 30-39	5.1%	65.5%	29.4%
Male, 40-49	1.7%	58.6%	39.7%
Male, 50-59	2.4%	58.4%	39.2%
Male, 60-69	4.0%	60.5%	35.4%
Male, 70+	4.5%	67.0%	28.5%
Female, 15-19	21.0%	76.5%	2.5%
Female, 20-29	20.7%	70.4%	8.9%
Female, 30-39	16.4%	68.7%	15.0%
Female, 40-49	12.9%	70.5%	16.6%
Female, 50-59	10.6%	68.7%	20.7%
Female, 60-69	9.4%	62.5%	28.1%
Female, 70+	9.7%	63.9%	26.4%

A 2025 study of over 8 million adults found that average BMI had increased from 2015 to 2020, especially in younger and middle aged adults.

== See also ==
- Epidemiology of obesity
- Health in Japan
