= Erik Keszthelyi =

Insurance professional, businessman

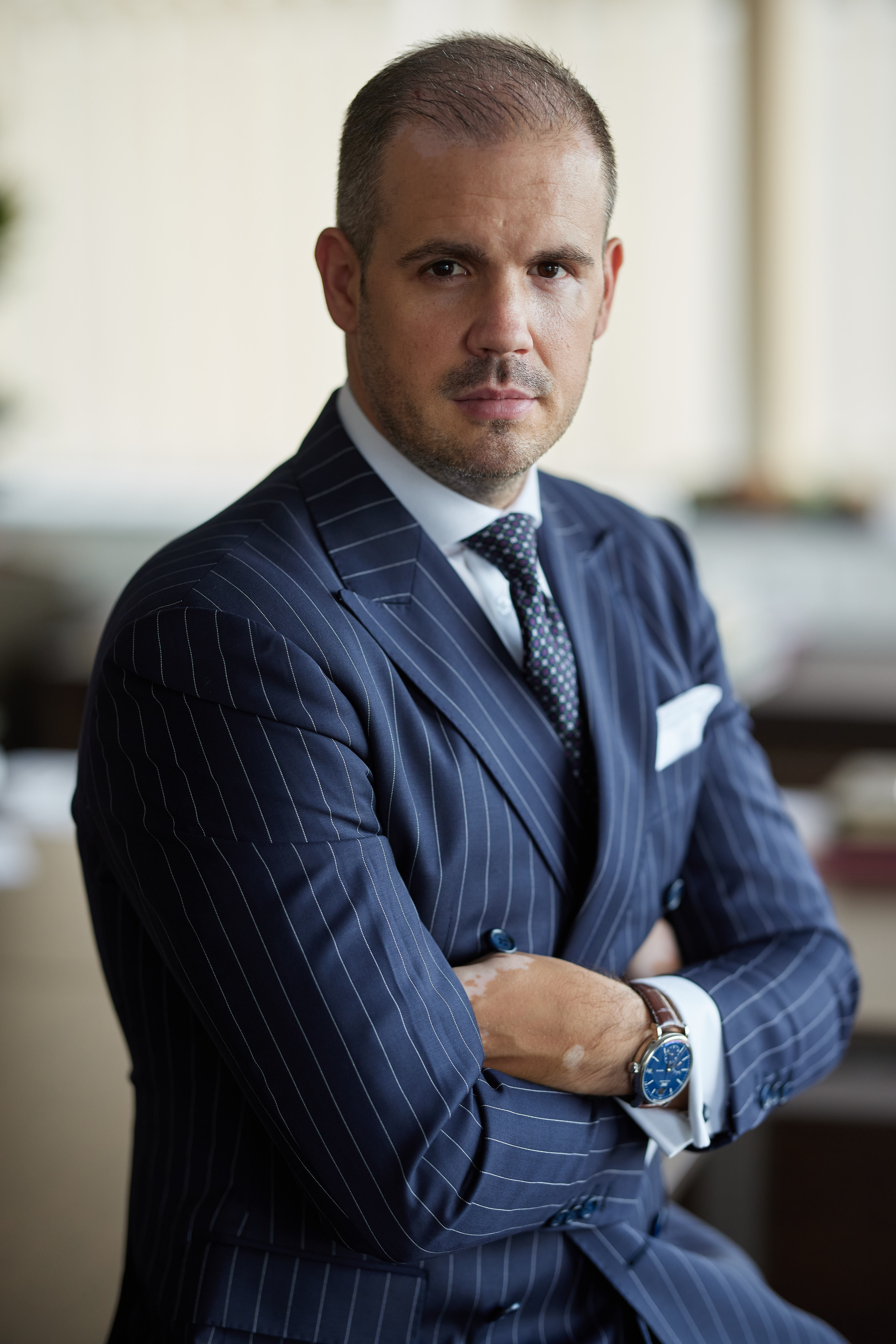
- Born: December 22, 1983 (age 42); Szekszárd
- Occupation: CEO of Hungarikum Biztosítási Alkusz
- Known for: Majority shareholder of CIG Pannonia

Erik Keszthelyi (born December 22, 1983) is a Hungarian economist and owner of Hungarikum Biztosítási Alkusz, the largest Hungarian-owned insurance broker, which also owns a majority stake in CIG Pannonia. He also holds the honorary title of university associate professor.

In the 2025 Forbes ranking of "50 leggazdagabb magyar" ("Hungary's 50 Richest People"), he was ranked 23rd. In "A 100 leggazdagabb magyar 2026" ("The 100 Richest Hungarians 2026") list, he was ranked 46th, with an estimated net worth of HUF 70.2 billion (approximately USD 226 million).

== Early life ==
Keszthelyi was born on 22. December 1983 in Szekszárd. His parents owned a restaurant where he also worked.

== Career ==
Keszthelyi started his career in the insurance business at the Grawe Group, an Austrian insurance company, where he completed a training course in 2005. Afterwards he decided to not pursue the family catering business and worked as a broker for MIC, a subsidiary of the Grawe Group. In 2010 he then bought a 20 percent stake in the insurance broker Optimal GB, which he took over completely in 2012 and later renamed to Hungarikum Biztosítási Alkusz Kft.(HBA). The company expanded significantly in 2013 when it won the bid for Volánbusz. In 2018 the Mészáros Group became a co-owner of HBA. In 2019, through Hungarikum Biztosítási Alkusz, he acquired a majority stake in UFS Group Pénzügyi Tervező, a company active in the retail and SME segments of the insurance broker market. In 2020 the insurance broker Reticulum Insurance Biztosítási Alkusz Kft. merged into Keszthelyi's HBA as did Insurance Partners Biztosítási Alkusz. Also in that year, MTB Magyar Takarékszövetkezeti Bank acquired a 25 percent stake in Keszthelyi's HUNBankbiztosítás Kft. By 2022, Keszthelyi and his group of companies had more than half a million customers, a turnover of HUF 17.5 billion and a market share of nearly 20 percent.

HBA took over the Insurance Partners Biztosítási Alkusz Kft. and renamed it to HUNInsurance Partners Biztosítási Alkuszban in 2020. In January 2023, he established Magyar Biztosítóholding, and Hungarikum Biztosítási Alkusz Kft. was transformed into a private limited company and continued to operate under the name Hungarikum Biztosítási Alkusz Zrt. In July 2023, Keszthelyi merged five of his companies, HUNInsurance, HUNInsurtech, HUNPartner, HUNPénzügyi Tervező and HUNRisk.hu into Hungarikum Biztosítási Alkusz Zrt., creating the largest Hungarian-owned insurance and financial services provider, which had a turnover of HUF 22.5 billion and a profit after tax of HUF 10.4 billion by the end of the year. In 2021, Hungarikum Biztosítási Alkusz was selected by the Budapest Stock Exchange as one of the BSÉ50 companies.

In August 2023, on an initiative from Keszthelyi, the three Hungarian universities of Miskolc, Széchenyi István and Dunaújváros agreed with HBA to start accredited higher education-level training in insurance and financial consultancy. According to the agreement, HBA will provide lecturers and internships for students.

=== CIG Pannonia ===
Keszthelyi, together with Lőrinc Mészáros, also bought a majority stake of CIG Pannónia Életbiztosító Nyrt., which is listed on the Budapest Stock Exchange and had an annual premium income of more than HUF 33 billion in 2022, through his company in late 2021 and increased its ownership stake to nearly 59 percent in August 2023.

== Charitable activities ==
In 2016, Keszthelyi's established HUNAlapítvány a Jövőért (originally called Keszthelyi Alapítvány a Mosolygó Gyermekekért / Keszthelyi Foundation for Smiling Children) to support the care and medical treatment of seriously ill and disadvantaged children and to provide patient care. It also provides access to culture, education, sport and community experiences for children and young people with outstanding achievements.

== Private life ==
Erik Keszthelyi is the father of two children.
