= National Health Care Act of 1958 =

Japanese legislation

The National Health Care Act of 1958 (国民健康保険法, kokuminkenkouhokenhou) is a Japanese act that governs the National Health Insurance system operated by Japanese municipalities for residents who are not enrolled in Employees Health Insurance. It was passed by the Diet of Japan on 27 December 1958.

== Details ==
- According to Article 5 of the Act, registered residents of a municipality should be enrolled in National Health Insurance. (NHI)
- According to Article 9, people must register for NHI.
- According to Article 127 the Act allows municipalities to set up a fine of up to 100,000 yen for people who do not comply with the Act.
