= Suicide in Japan =

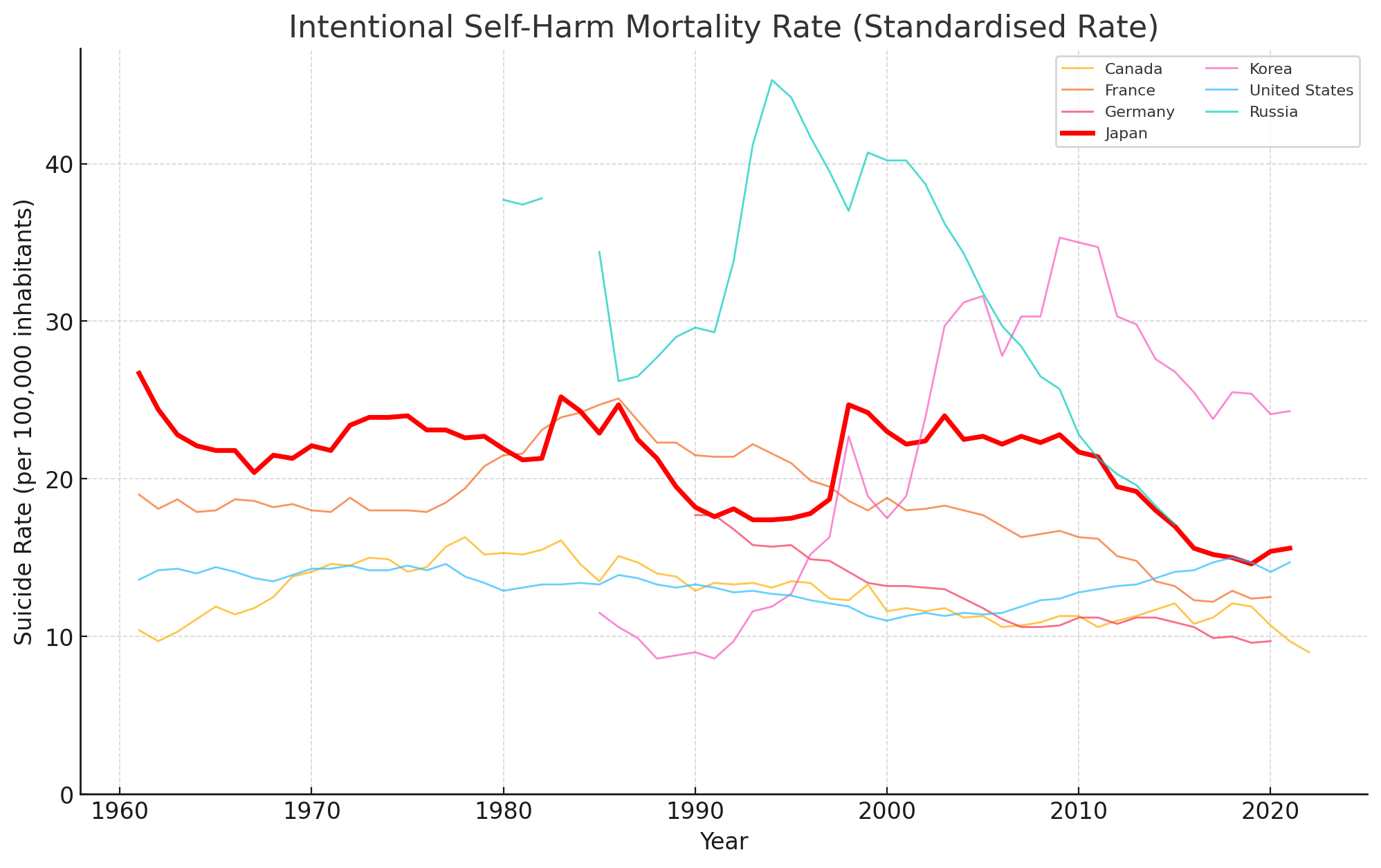
Suicide deaths per 100,000 persons (1960–2021) in Japan, Canada, Korea, France, Germany, the United States, and Russia

According to WHO's 2021 suicide report, Japan ranked 23rd of the 183 countries listed. The Japanese government plans to reduce the suicide rate by at least thirty percent by 2026 from 18.5 per 100,000 persons in 2015.

In 1997, suicide rates spiked heavily, increasing by 34.7% in 1998 alone and remaining relatively high for over a decade. After peaking in 2003, suicide rates have been gradually declining, falling to the lowest on record (since 1978) in 2019. Monthly suicide rates in Japan increased by 16% between July and October 2020, due to a number of reasons attributed to the COVID-19 pandemic. In 2022, suicide rates in Japan also increased by 17% from 2020 alone, due to a number of factors attributed to the spread of the COVID-19 Omicron variant.

70% of suicides in Japan are male, and it is the leading cause of death in men aged 20–44.

Historically, cultural attitudes towards suicide in Japan have been described as "tolerant", with certain types of suicides being considered honorable, especially during military service. For example, seppuku, a form of ritual suicide by self-disembowelment, was practiced mainly by samurai to avoid dishonor, such as after defeat in battle or after bringing shame upon oneself. During World War II, the Empire of Japan regularly employed banzai charge suicide attacks, and towards the end of the war, kamikaze units, and encouraged suicide as a preferable alternative to capture. The suicide rate per one hundred thousand people in 2024 was 15.3.

== Motives for suicide ==
In order to better overview the motives behind suicides, in 2007, the National Police Agency (NPA) revised the categorization of motives for suicide into a division of 50 reasons, with up to three reasons listed for each suicide.

As of 2020, health issues led the motive for 49% of all suicides. However, because the category for health issues includes both mental (e.g., depression) and physical issues, it is not possible to distinguish between the two. Financial- or poverty-related issues led 17%, household issues at 15%, and workplace issues at 10%. Relationship issues and school led 4% and 2% respectively, while remaining 10% were for other reasons.

== Demographics of suicide victims ==
Most suicides are men: 70% of suicide victims in 2019 were male. Among men 20–44 years old, and among women 15–29 years old, it is the leading cause of death.

By occupation, 59.3% of suicide victims were in the broad "Not Employed" category, which is not to be confused with the colloquialism "unemployed" (as in those who are seeking but unable to find a job). The "Not Employed" category also includes pensioners, homemakers and others.

Heisei 27 (2015) suicide victims by occupation
| Occupation | | % of total suicide victims |
|---|---|---|
| Employees | | 28.2% |
| Self employed or working for family | | 7.1% |
| Students | | 3.5% |
| Unknown | | 1.6% |
| "Not Employed" | People with government insurance or pensioners (including unemployment insurance and worker's compensation) | 26.1% |
| "Not Employed" | Homemakers | 6.2% |
| "Not Employed" | Unemployed | 4.0% |
| "Not Employed" | Homeless | 0.1% |
| "Not Employed" | Other | 22.9% |

The prefecture with the highest overall suicide rates as of 2019 was Yamanashi prefecture, with 22.3 suicide victims per 100,000 inhabitants, 39% above the national average of 16.0 victims per 100,000 people. The three prefectures with the lowest suicide rate were Kanagawa, Kyoto, and Osaka prefecture, with respective rates of 11.7, 12.5, and 14.0

While the teenage suicide rate in Japan is lower than the OECD country average, teenage suicide rates have been the only category to increase slightly in recent years, despite the significant drop in overall suicide rates over the past decade. The motives for suicides may be related to bullying, but can also be due to abuse from teachers. The Japanese neologism shidōshi (指導死) is used in cases where students commit suicide as a result of strict discipline from teachers.

== Suicide sites and hotspots ==
An infamous location for suicides is Aokigahara, a forested area at the base of Mount Fuji. In the period leading up to 1988, around 30 suicides occurred there every year. In 1999, 74 suicides occurred, the most on record in a given year until 2002, when 78 suicides were reported. The following year, a total of 105 bodies were found, making 2003 the deadliest year on record in Aokigahara. The area is patrolled by police looking for suicides. Police records show that, in 2010, there were 247 suicide attempts (54 of which were fatal) in the forest.

Railroad tracks are also a common place for suicide, and the Chūō Rapid Line is particularly known for a high number. Some Japanese railroad companies have installed platform screen doors, and/or blue-tinted lights which are intended to calm people's mood, in attempts to decrease suicide attempts in stations.

== Ties with business ==
Japan's economy, the world's second-largest at the time, experienced its worst recession since World War II in early 2009, in the aftermath of the 2008 financial crisis, propelling the nation's jobless rate to a record high of 5.7% in July 2009, causing a small uptick in suicides that year. As a result of job losses, social inequality (as measured on the Gini coefficient) has also increased, which has been shown in studies to have affected the suicide rates in Japan proportionately more than in other OECD countries.

A contributing factor to the suicide statistics among those who were employed was the increasing pressure of retaining jobs by putting in more hours of overtime and taking fewer holidays and sick days. Out of 2,875 work-related suicides in 2023, the second common cause (707 suicides) was fatigue from work.

Furthermore, the void experienced after being forced to retire from the workplace is said to be partly responsible for the large number of elderly suicides every year. In response to these deaths, many companies, communities, and local governments have begun to offer activities and classes for recently retired senior citizens who are at risk of feeling isolated, lonely, and without purpose or identity.

Consumer loan companies have much to do with the suicide rate. The National Police Agency states that one fourth of all suicides are financially motivated. Many deaths every year are described as "responsibility-driven" suicides (引責自殺, inseki-jisatsu). Japanese banks set extremely tough conditions for loans, forcing borrowers to use relatives and friends as guarantors who become liable for the defaulted loans, producing extreme guilt and despair in the borrower. Rather than placing the burden on their guarantors, many have been attempting to take responsibility for their unpaid loans and outstanding debts through life insurance payouts.

In fiscal year 2005, 17 consumer loan firms received a combined 4.3 billion yen in suicide policy payouts on 4,908 borrowers – or some 15% of the 32,552 suicides in 2005. Lawyers and other experts allege that, in some cases, collectors harass debtors to the point they take this route. Japanese nonbank lenders, starting in the mid-1990s, began taking out life insurance policies which include suicide payouts on borrowers that included suicide coverage, and borrowers are not required to be notified. On 13 December 2006, a revision to the Money Lending Business Law was made that prevents lenders from taking out suicide insurance on debtors.

== Cultural attitudes towards suicide ==
There is substantial cultural tolerance in Japan for suicide, which has been "elevated to the level of an aesthetic experience" through cultural and social experiences common to many Japanese.

The general attitude toward suicide has been termed "tolerant", and in many occasions Japanese society sees suicide as a morally responsible action. This cultural tolerance may stem from the historical function of suicide in the military. In feudal Japan, honorable formal suicide (seppuku) among samurai (Japanese warriors) was considered a justified response to failure or to inevitable defeat in battle. Traditionally, seppuku involved the slashing open of one's stomach with a sword. The purpose of this was to release the samurai's spirit upon the enemy and thus avoid dishonorable execution and probable torture at the hand of an enemy. Today, honor suicides are also referred to as hara-kiri (lit. 'belly-cutting').

Cultural tolerance of suicide in Japan may also be explained by the concept of amae, or the need to be dependent on and accepted by others. Japanese people value acceptance and conformity above individuality. As a result of this perspective, one's worth is associated with how one is perceived by others. Ultimately, this can lead to fragile self-concept and an increased likelihood of considering dying by suicide when one feels alienated.

The cultural heritage of suicide as a noble tradition still has some resonance. While being investigated for an expenses scandal, Cabinet minister Toshikatsu Matsuoka took his life in 2007. The former governor of Tokyo, Shintaro Ishihara, described him as a "true samurai" for preserving his honour. Ishihara was also the scriptwriter for the film I Go To Die For You, which glorifies the memory and bravery of the kamikaze pilots in WWII.

Although Japanese culture historically permitted more tolerant views on the morality and social acceptability of suicide, the rapid growth in the suicide rate since the 1990s has increased public concern about suicide. In particular, the trend of increased Internet usage among adolescents and young adults as well as the rising popularity of websites related to suicide has raised concerns from the public and the media about how Internet culture may be contributing to higher suicide rates.

One phenomenon that has been particularly concerning is that of shinjū (suicide pacts) that form among individuals, typically strangers, via Internet forums and messageboards. These pacts, which are popularly referred to as "Internet group suicide", are formed with the intention of all individuals meeting to die by suicide at the same time, by the same method.

While the concept of group suicide also has a historical presence in Japanese culture, traditional shinjū differs from modern Internet group suicide because it occurred among lovers or family members rather than among strangers. Another difference is that mutual consent from those who die by historical shinjū was not required. In other words, certain forms of shinjū might be considered "murder-suicide" in Western cultures rather than suicide. An example of this type of shinjū would be a mother killing her children and then killing herself.

An example of historical shinjū in Japanese literature occurs in Chikamatsu Monzaemon's puppet play from 1703 entitled Sonezaki Shinjū ("The Love Suicides at Sonezaki"), which was later re-engineered for the kabuki theater. The inspiration for the play was an actual double suicide which had then recently occurred between two forbidden lovers.

These modern shinjū have not received the same level of tolerance or social acceptability as honor suicides (seppuku or hara-kiri) from the Japanese media. Internet group suicide has generally been portrayed as a thoughtless and impulsive act by the media because it seems that there is no compelling reason for why individuals enter into such pacts. In contrast, seppuku serves a specific function; to preserve honor rather than die at the hand of an enemy. However, this perception has been challenged by research on Internet group suicide by Ozawa de-Silva, who argues that these deaths are "characterized by severe existential suffering, a loss of the "worth of living" (ikigai) ... and a profound loneliness and lack of connection with others".

According to The New Yorker, "by tradition, a mother who killed herself but not her children was thought to be truly wicked."

=== Religion, sin, and suicide ===
Discussing Japanese culture, Mark L. Blum suggests that "[n]o organized religion will openly condone suicide", but identifies four "sociocultural spheres where room is made for the acceptance of suicide without taint of sin: (1) suicide as altruistic sacrifice; (2) suicide as resignation to one's fate – often as an expression of lamentation; (3) suicide as religious offering; and (4) suicide as a means to gain honor."

== Government response ==
In 2007, the government released a nine-step plan, a "counter-suicide White Paper", with hopes of curbing suicide by 21% by 2017. The goal of the white paper is to encourage investigation of the root causes of suicide in order to prevent it, change cultural attitudes toward suicide, and improve treatment of suicides attempts. In 2009, the Japanese government committed 16.3 billion yen towards suicide prevention strategies.

Japan has allotted ¥12.4 billion (US$133 million) in suicide prevention assets for the 2010 fiscal year ending March 2011, with plans to fund public counseling for those with overwhelming debts and those needing treatment for depression.

Amid the overall increase in self-inflicted death for 2009, the government claims there have been encouraging signs since September. The Cabinet Office said the number of monthly suicides declined year-on-year between September 2009 and April 2010. According to preliminary figures compiled by the NPA, the number of suicides fell by 9.0% from the year before. In 2012, the number of annual suicides in Japan dropped below 30,000. In 2013, the number of suicides continued to decline.

In 2017, the Japanese government approved a plan to reduce suicides in Japan by 30% by setting up a guideline. It seeks to decrease the number of suicides to no more than 16,000 by 2025. The government has pledged to screen the mental health of post-natal mothers. In addition, a toll-free hotline was set up in response to prejudice against sexual minorities.

In 2021, the Japanese government appointed Tetsushi Sakamoto as the first Minister of Loneliness to reduce loneliness and social isolation among its citizens. This came after an increase during the July–October period of the country's suicide rate during the COVID-19 pandemic.

According to Japan Today, the number of people who committed suicide in Japan in 2021 was 20,830. The figure was 251 fewer than in 2020, however, it was 661 higher than 2019, the year before the coronavirus spread. Of the total, 13,815 were males, an increase of 240 over 2021, while 7,015 were females, 92 more than in 2020. Health ministry officials attributed the rise in suicides to effects of the prolonged coronavirus which has caused many people to lose their jobs or suffer a drop in income.

A 2022 study conducted by a team of researchers said there were 8,000 more suicides in Japan during the COVID-19 pandemic period—between March 2020 and June 2022—than would have been expected without it. The increase was mostly driven by a fallout on economic and social activities, leading the government to consider data such as the suicide rate to further relax antivirus measures.

== See also ==
- Health care system in Japan
- Health in Japan
- List of countries by suicide rate
