= 1967 Saga gubernatorial election =

Election for Governor of Saga Prefecture

- 15 April 1967
Nominee	Sunao Ikeda	Kōzō Eguchi
Party	Independent	JCP
Popular vote	340,399	39,092
Governor before election
Sunao Ikeda
Independent
Elected Governor
Sunao Ikeda
Independent

A gubernatorial election was held on 15 April 1967 to elect the Governor of Saga Prefecture. Incumbent Sunao Ikeda defeated communist candidate Kōzō Eguchi.

== Candidates ==
- Sunao Ikeda - incumbent Governor of Saga Prefecture, age 65
- Kōzō Eguchi (江口子午三, Eguchi Kōzō) - House of Councillors candidate in 1950, 1965, and later 1968, age 58

== Results ==
Saga Gubernatorial Election 1967
Party	Candidate	Votes	%	±%
Independent	Sunao Ikeda (incumbent)	340,399		
JCP	Kōzō Eguchi	39,092		
