= Public health centres in Japan =

In Japan, a public health centre (Japanese: 保健所 Hokenjo) is a government facility responsible for public health matters.

The primary role of public health centre is to prevent infectious disease and chronic health problems. It is responsible for monitoring air and water quality, inspecting and licensing waterworks, beauty salons, barbers, food processing facilities, restaurants, hotels, doctors and hospitals, and also animal control. It also provides health consultation to patients with mental illness or chronic health problems such as cancer and asthma.

== See also ==
- Health care in Japan
- Ministry of Health, Labour and Welfare
