= National Health Insurance (Japan) =

Statutory type of insurance programs in Japan

National Health Insurance (国民健康保険, Kokumin-Kenkō-Hoken) is one of the two major statutory types of insurance programs available in Japan. The other is Employees' Health Insurance (健康保険, Kenkō-Hoken). National Health insurance is designed for people who are not eligible to be members of any employment-based health insurance program. Although private insurance is also available, all Japanese citizens, permanent residents, and any non-Japanese residing in Japan with a visa lasting three months or longer are required to be enrolled in either National Health Insurance or Employees' Health Insurance. On July 9, 2012, the alien registration system was abolished and foreigners are now able to apply as part of the Basic Resident Registration System. Foreigners who reside in Japan for more than three months need to register for national health insurance. It is defined by the National Health Care Act of 1958.

== History ==
Japan's first health insurance system was introduced in 1922. It took effect in 1927 to cover laborers, and in 1938 was extended to cover farmers also. The system originated from labor unions representing workers in dangerous industries, and over time was gradually extended so that currently all Japanese citizens and residents should be covered.

The current NHI system, which is managed by local municipal governments, was introduced in 1961. The information in this article relates to Minato Ward in Tokyo, and NHI conditions in other municipalities may differ.

== Joining NHI ==
People are required to join the NHI within two weeks of becoming eligible. This is required if a person moves to the municipality from another municipality or overseas and isn't covered by Employees' Health Insurance, withdraws from Employees' Health Insurance (for example, due to job loss), stops receiving public assistance, or is born (and not covered under parents' Employees Health Insurance).

Those who do not register when they become eligible and register later, can be charged for up to two years of back payments.

A person applies to their local ward office or city office, which issues them with a NHI card, and invoices for the NHI premiums. The insured person then pays the premiums, and is now covered.

== How the National Health Insurance works ==
When the insured person uses a medical facility that accepts NHI, they will only need to pay part of the cost.

The medical facility will then send invoices for the remaining amount to the National Health Insurance Federation, which reviews and pays the medical facility. After this, the NHIF reports on the invoices to the municipal office, which reimburses the NHIF.

== Withdrawing from NHI ==
There are several different grounds for withdrawing from NHI.

- As NHI is managed by local municipalities, if an insured person moves to another municipality, they must withdraw from their current municipality's NHI and enter the NHI of their new area.
- If the insured person is not a Japanese citizen and leaves Japan without intention of returning, or without re-entry permission they must settle their premium in advance.
- NHI members also withdraw if they join Employees' Health Insurance, start receiving public assistance, or pass away.

== Other notifications ==
Insured people are required to notify the city if they change their address, their name, the head of household, lose their NHI card, or the NHI members covered under the card have changed. 134

== Insurance premiums ==
In 2013 the calculation method for premiums changed.

There are three types of NHI premiums. The head of household is responsible for payment, even if they are not a NHI member. The rate at which the premiums are calculated is based on the Resident's tax (住民税, juuminzei) amount charged by the local municipal government. This is in turn based on income earned by that member during the previous calendar year. Resident's tax is determined in June, and notifications are sent in July. Because of this, the yearly NHI premium is divided into 10 installments. In 2010 the premiums were:

- Category 1 - The basic premium (for regular NHI members.)

Calculated by multiplying the total residents tax paid by all NHI members in the household by 0.80. This is the income levy. Then multiplying the number of insured household members by 39,000. This is the per capita levy. These two levies added together are the annual premium that must be paid. The maximum possible is 580,000 per year.

- Category 2 - The premium for supporting the elderly (for people older than 75.)

Calculated by multiplying the total residents tax paid by all NHI members in the household by 0.23. This is the income levy. Then multiplying the number of insured household members by 12,000. This is the per capita levy. These two levies added together are the annual premium that must be paid. The maximum possible is 190,000 per year.

- Category 3 - For nursing care (for people in long-term care)

Calculated by multiplying the total residents tax paid by all category 2 NHI members in the household by 0.11. This is the income levy. Then multiplying the number of category 2 household members by 15,600. This is the per capita levy. These two levies added together are the annual premium that must be paid. The maximum possible is 160,000 per year.

== Collection procedures ==
If NHI members do not make payment, a reminder will be sent. If payment is still not received after the reminder, the members NHI card will be replaced with a short term (6 month) card.

If payment has not been received for a year, NHI members may have to return their NHI card, and will be provided with an eligibility certificate. This shows that the person is a NHI member and can receive treatment, but must bear all the costs themselves. However, it is possible that the amount that NHI bears can be applied to the members premiums at a later date.

If payments are not made, the municipality may have the members property (savings, salaries, telephone lines, etc.) seized to pay for the arrears.

== NHI benefits ==
=== General medical benefits ===
When the insured person uses a medical facility that accepts NHI, they will only need to pay part of the cost. As of 2011 this copayment will be either 10% or 30% depending on the income of the insured person, and in April 2011 the lowest rate will rise to 20%.

Those aged between 70 and 74 are entitled to a NHI Elderly Recipient Certificate. Those with this certificate have to make a copayment of either 10% or 30% depending on their income.

=== Exceptions ===
NHI cannot be used in the following cases:

- Failure to follow doctor's instructions regarding treatment.
- Intentionally inflicted injury or illness resulting from a crime or suicide attempt.
- Injury or illness resulting from a fight or drunkenness.
- Treatment unrelated to illness (health examinations, preventative injections, cosmetic surgery, orthodontic work, normal child delivery/abortion for economic reasons, etc.).
- Private or semi-private room charges during your hospitalization.
- Injury during work (either covered by worker's compensation or the employer).
- When a patient themselves desired to receive treatment without using the insurance.
- Combination of insured and uninsured treatment or totally uninsured treatment in dental treatment using special materials.

Members can apply for benefits within two years of becoming entitled.

=== Hospitalization expenses ===
For those under 70 years of age: If NHI members show their NHI card and a Maximum Ceiling Amount Applicable Certificate together the member will only have to pay the amount specified as their personally borne expense ceiling. For members who are exempt from residents tax, a Ceiling Applied/Standard Personally Borne Amount Reduction Certificate is required. These certificates must be applied for at the city office.

For those over 70 years of age: If NHI members over 70 years old who pay Resident's tax show their NHI card and an Old Age Medical Insurance card they only have to pay the amount specified as their personally borne expense ceiling.

Maximum Ceiling Amount Applicable Certificate together the member will only have to pay the amount specified as their personally born expense ceiling. For members who are exempt from residents tax, their NHI card, Old-Age Medical Insurance Card and a Ceiling Applied/Standard Personally Borne Amount Reduction Certificate is required. This certificate must be applied for at the city office.

=== Cash reimbursements ===
NHI members can go to their city office to apply for cash reimbursements for when they pay the full amount for medical services. It takes about three months. Situations covered are:

- If a member was treated for a sudden illness without showing their NHI card and had to pay the entire cost.
- When the NHI member unavoidably received treatment at a facility that does not accept NHI. If using this facility was voluntary no reimbursement can be received.
- For the costs of medical corsets, casts, or other therapeutic devices recommended by a doctor.
- When acupuncture, moxibustion, or massage is received upon a doctors consent. Reimbursement does not always happen in this case.
- Transportation costs during emergencies or if the member has trouble walking when hospitalized and leaving the hospital.
- If a member receives medical treatment overseas after falling suddenly ill. This does not apply if the member travels overseas for the purpose of recuperating.

=== Subsidies for high medical expenses ===
If the personally borne medical expenses exceed a certain amount NHI members can apply to have a certain amount reimbursed. Reimbursements are paid about four months after the medical service is provided.

NHI members under 70 years of age must show their NHI card and either their Maximum Ceiling Amount Applicable Certificate or Ceiling Applied/Standard Personally-Borne Amount Reduction Certificate to pay only their personally borne expense ceiling. Members under 70 years old are not eligible for the high-cost medical benefit.

NHI members over 70 and under 75 years of age are responsible for paying up to their expense ceiling as usual. But members from households who are exempt from resident's tax will be categorized as Low Income Earner 1 or 2.

Ceiling Applied/Standard Personally-Borne Amount Reduction Certificate is required for these members to have the amount they must pay decreased from their normal personally borne expense ceiling.

=== Designated ceilings for personally-borne medical expenses ===
Elderly Recipient Certificate holder (over 70 and under 75 years old)
	As an individual (outpatient only)	As a household (includes hospitalization
Almost the same income as pre-retirement	¥44,400	¥80,100+[(Total Medical Expense - ¥267,000) x 1%)] 4th time or more in 1 year ¥44,400.
General	¥12,000	¥44,400
Low Income Earner 1	¥8,000	¥24,600
Low Income Earner 2	¥8,000	¥15,000

Under 70 Years Old
	Up to 3 times	4th and subsequent time
Taxable household - High Income	¥150,000+[(Total Medical Expenses - ¥500,000) x 1%]	¥83,400
Taxable Households - General	¥80,000+[(Total Medical Expenses - ¥267,000) x 1%]	¥44,400
Non-taxable households	¥35,400	¥24,600

=== High medical expense subsidy application procedures ===
An application kit should be sent three or four months after the month of the examination/treatment. The form should be completed and returned to the city office.

If the expenses were from hospitalization, members should apply for a Maximum Ceiling Amount Applicable Certificate or a Ceiling Applied/Standard Personally Borne Amount Reduction Certificate, whichever is appropriate. Members who have one of these certificates will only need to pay the maximum ceiling amount for the examination/treatment, and therefore have no need to apply for a High Medical Expense Subsidy.

=== Loans for high medical expenses ===
As it takes a long time for reimbursements for high medical expenses to be made, loans are available for those who have trouble paying their medical bills in the meantime.

Requirements: Those who are prospective candidates for a High Medical Expense Subsidy.

Loan amount: Within 90% of the estimated High Medical Expense Subsidy.

- There is also another method by which the NHI member pays the personally-borne expense ceiling amount to the medical institution, and the city pays the high medical expense subsidy directly to the medical institution, pending approval of the medical institution.
- For hospitalization expenses, members who apply for a Maximum Ceiling Amount Applicable Certificate or a Ceiling Applied/Standard Personally Borne Amount Reduction Certificate, whichever is appropriate and show it to the medical institution counter, members will only need to pay the maximum ceiling amount for the examination/treatment, and therefore have no need to apply for a loan.

=== Meal expenses during hospitalization ===
During hospitalization, members must bear a portion of the meal expense.

Meal expenses payable during hospitalization
Classification	Expense per meal
General NHI member	¥260
Resident's tax-exempt household(i)	¥210
Resident's tax-exempt household(ii)	¥160
Resident's tax-exempt household(iii)	¥100

(i) Hospitalized up to 90 days in the last 12 months

(ii) Hospitalized over 90 days in the last 12 months

(iii) Recipient of the Elderly Recipient Certificate whose household is exempt from resident's ta and the total income of the household is ¥0 (Pension income is calculated with deduction amount as ¥800,000.

=== Childbirth allowance ===
When a NHI member gives birth, ¥420,000 will be provided for each child. This allowance is also paid in cases of miscarriage or stillbirth if this occurs after 85 days (4 months) of pregnancy. However, this will not be provided to those who receive a childbirth allowance from other health insurance programs. The mother presents her NHI card at the hospital, and NHI will pay the hospital directly. If the cost of childbirth is more than ¥420,000 the member must pay the remainder. If the cost is less than ¥420,000, the member will receive the balance. A form will be sent approximately 2 months after delivery, which must be returned to claim the balance.

It is also possible to apply for this childbirth allowance if the NHI member has their baby outside Japan, the member should speak to the local city office about the procedures for doing this.

=== Funeral allowances ===
When a NHI member dies, ¥70,000 is paid for funeral services. However, if a person who was covered under Employees' Health Insurance died within 3 months of resignation, Employees' Health Insurance will pay for the funeral allowance, not NHI. Also, if the death was due to the act of a third party (such as a traffic accident) and their compensation is available, NHI will not provide the funeral allowance.

=== Individual medical expense reductions or exemptions ===
A portion of the cost of medical treatment must be paid by the NHI member. However, if their livelihood has been affected by a natural disaster, unemployment, or other difficulties, then reductions of or exemptions from paying their copayment are possible for a period of up to three months.

=== Injuries from traffic accidents or attacks ===
Reports are required before receiving treatment with an NHI certificate. For injuries caused by a third party (for example a traffic accident or assault) the person who caused the injury is liable. However, it may be possible to use NHI if the person responsible does not pay and if the proper notifications are filed. The NHI will charge the responsible person afterwards. If you receive treatment using NHI, you must contact the NHI and Pension section of the city office before and submit "report of accident and sickness by the third party" later.

=== Exceptions ===
NHI cannot be used in the following cases:

- The treatment fee was already paid by the person who caused the accident
- Work-related injuries
- Injuries due to driving while intoxicated or without a license

== Disclosure of medical fee receipts ==
If it receives a request, after about one month the city will disclose medical fee receipts and other documents to:

- The person whose name is on the receipt
- Bereaved family members (parents, spouse, or children)
- Legal representatives where the person or their bereaved family members are minors or wards who are of age
- Attorney appointed by the said person or their bereaved family members

== Long Life Health Insurance system ==
When NHI members reach 75 years old (or 65 for those with a certain degree of disability) they can receive medical care under the Long Life Health Insurance System. An insurance card is issued to all eligible members. Premiums are based on the member's income.

== See also ==
- Health in Japan
- Health care system in Japan
- National Health Care Act of 1958
