= National Pension (Japan) =

Pension system for all residents of Japan

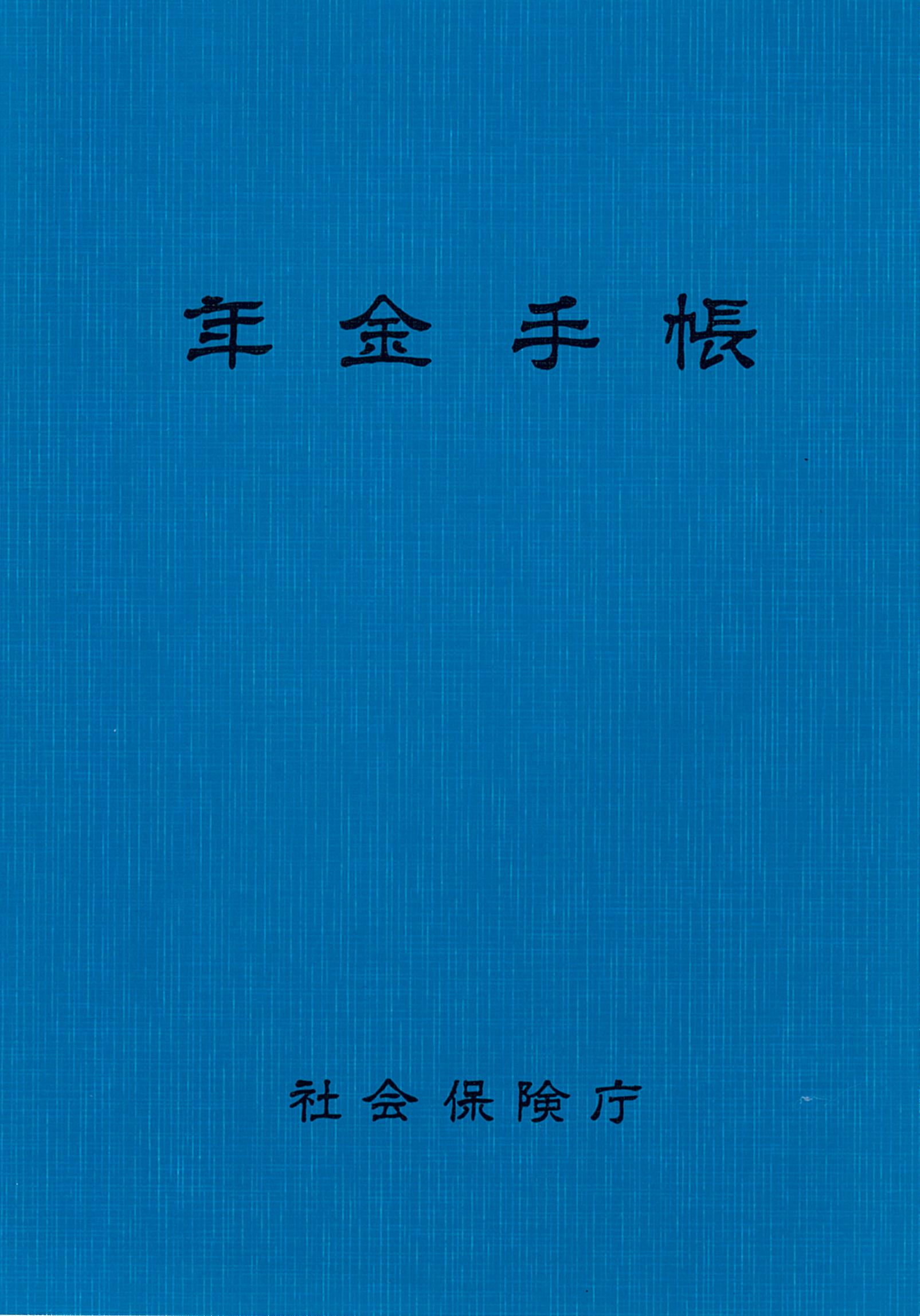
A Pension Notebook issued by Japan Pension Service.

The National Pension (国民年金, Kokumin Nenkin) is a pension system operated by the Japan Pension Service. All Japanese nationals and foreign residents are required to enroll in it.

== History ==
In 1942 the Workers Pension Insurance Act was enacted, and in 1944 the name was changed to Employees' Pension Insurance Act. It was amended substantially in 1954, and in 1961 the National Pension Act created universal pension coverage for residents of Japan.

== Types of members ==
(This is also described under Social Welfare in Japan)

- Category 1 – All registered residents of Japan who are aged between 20 and 60 years old, but do not fit into either category 2 or 3 (i.e. typically the unemployed, self-employed, or employees of very small companies). People in this category should go to the National Pension counter at their local municipal office. (People in this category are enrolled in the national health insurance scheme).
- Category 2 – Workers who are enrolled by their employer in Employees Pension schemes (such as the Kigyō Nenkin Rengōkai (企業年金連合会) Pension Fund Association, successor to Kōsei Nenkin (厚生年金), or Mutual Aid association (such as the Shigaku Kyōsai (私学共済) Private School Mutual Aid Association). These pension contributions include the basic national pension. Pension contributions are deducted from the workers' salary by the employer. (People in this category are enrolled in an employee health insurance scheme).
- Category 3 – People aged between 20 and 60 years old who are dependent on Category 2 contributors. Contributions are waived for Category 3 members, as their contributions are subsidized by all Category 2 contributors.

=== Pension handbook ===
Once a person has enrolled in the national pension they will receive a pension handbook with their Individual Number attached to it If the pension handbook is lost, Category 1 members can apply at the local municipal office for it to be reissued. Category 2 members can ask their employer or the local Japan Pension Service office. Category 3 members must ask through the employer of the Category 2 member on whom they are financially dependent.

== Monthly contributions ==
The monthly contribution amount for the national pension from April 2025 to March 2026 is ¥17,510. Contributions for each month must be paid by the end of the following month. Contributions can be paid at banks, post offices, or convenience stores, as well as by bank transfer or online.

== Payment difficulties ==
If members have trouble paying due to low income or other reasons they should apply for an exemption from contribution payments at their local municipal office. The pension office will examine their previous year's income and other factors and may give a total or partial exemption from payments.

Payment exemptions
Type of exemption	Contribution amount	Amount of old-age basic pension
Full exemption	¥0	4/8
1/4 payment (3/4 exemption)	¥3,780	5/8
1/2 payment (1/2 exemption)	¥7,550	6/8
3/4 payment (1/4 exemption)	¥11,330	7/8
Contribution postponement for low-income youth	¥0	¥0
Special payment system for students	¥0	¥0

Failure to make partial payments after an arrangement has been made will be regarded as non-payment rather than partial exemption. Periods of non-payment may not be included in calculating the old-age basic pension that the member will receive in the future. In addition, non-paying members will not be entitled to the disability basic pension and survivors basic pension in the case of unexpected circumstances.

People in their 20s can use the contribution postponement system for low-income youth.

Students can use the special payment system for students. Generally speaking, students at Japanese schools overseas are not eligible for the special payment system for students.

=== Recovery of past exempted contributions ===
Payments making up for payments that the member was exempted from in the past can be made for up to 10 years afterwards. If they are brought fully up to date, the members old age basic pension will be calculated in the same manner as for full contribution payments.

== Pension benefits offered by the national pension system ==
- Old age basic pension – Pension benefits are paid from age 65 to persons who satisfy certain conditions, such as having paid their national pension contributions for 10 years or more. The benefit amount per year, as of Financial Year 2018, for members who paid contributions for 40 years is ¥779,300.
- Disability basic pension – Members can receive the disability basic pension if they experience sickness or injury resulting in a grade 1 or grade 2 disability during the time they are covered by the national pension. As of Financial Year 2018, the annual amount for grade 1 is ¥974,125 and the annual amount for grade 2 is ¥779,300.
- Survivors basic pension – The survivors basic pension is provided to family members (spouses who care for children, or dependent children themselves) of national pension members who pass away. The benefit amount is ¥1,003,600 (as of financial year 2018, for a wife with one child). For naturalized citizens of Japan, the period of time between April 1, 1964, and the day prior to them become citizens in which they lived overseas will be included in the 10-year qualifying period for the old age basic pension. However, this time will not be used in calculating the benefit they will receive.

Both the disability basic pension and the survivors basic pension have set contribution payment requirements. Such benefits can't be received unless these requirements are met.

== Lump-sum withdrawal payments ==
Foreign residents who have contributed to the national pension for 6 months or more (not including as category 2 or 3 members) and who have not contributed for 10 years, can claim a lump-sum withdrawal payment within two years of leaving Japan. However, even if a Japanese or foreign resident has not contributed for 10 years, if their country has a reciprocal social security agreement with Japan, some such agreements allow the number of years of contributions in both countries to be totalized in determining eligibility. Even if there is no such reciprocal agreement, they may be able to receive a pension based on kara kikan (カラ期間) (period spent outside Japan after age 20) if they become permanent residents before the age of 65.

The amount of the lump-sum withdrawal depends on the number of months that contributions were paid for:

Lump-sum withdrawal payments
Total contribution-paid period	Benefit amount
Between 6 and 11 months	¥45,300
Between 12 and 17 months	¥90,600
Between 18 and 23 months	¥135,900
Between 24 and 29 months	¥181,200
Between 30 and 35 months	¥226,500
36 months or more	¥271,800

The total contribution period paid period is calculated as follows: Total number of months paid + (number of months of one-quarter contribution paid × 0.25) + (number of months of half-contribution paid × 0.5) + (number of months of three-quarters contribution paid × 0.75). Application procedures for lump-sum withdrawal payments. When canceling their alien registration, pension members should file a notice of forfeiture of national pension, and get a claim for the lump-sum withdrawal payment. After leaving Japan the claim form should be sent to the Japan Pension Service.

The reason for the lump sum not increasing after 36 months of paying into the pension scheme are unclear, but may relate to the JET Programme, where young foreign graduates come to Japan to teach English in public schools. Until 2006, JET participants could only work in the program for three years and it appears the lump sum rules were crafted with this in mind.

== Social security agreements ==
Some countries have concluded bilateral agreements with Japan to eliminate dual coverage in pension systems and allow enrollment periods in foreign pension system to be counted when calculating eligibility and benefits to be paid. Social Security (mandatory health insurance, employment insurance, and pension contribution) payments by employees are typically about ¥40,000 per month.

== See also ==
- Japan Pension Service
