= Henrik Lévay =

Hungarian businessman

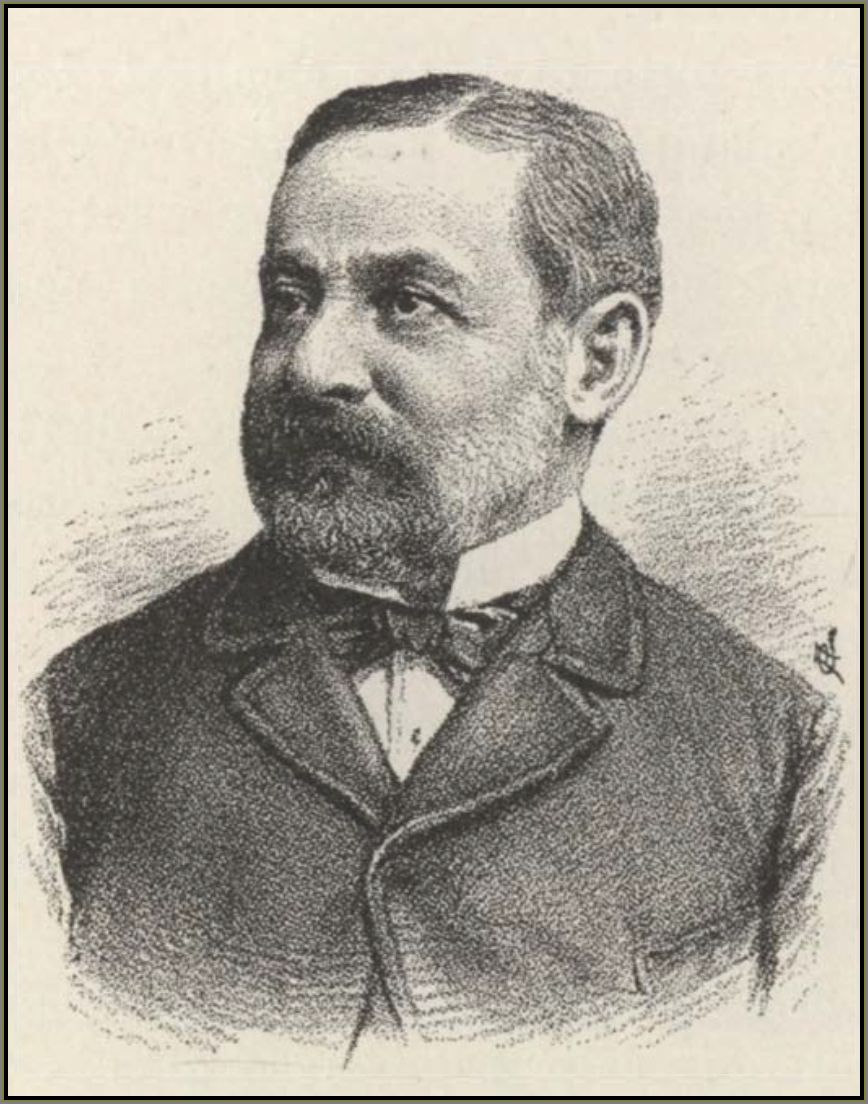
- Henrik Lévay in 1887
- Born: April 16, 1826; Jánoshalma, Hungary
- Died: December 15, 1901 (aged 75); Budapest
- Occupation: Financier
- Known for: Establishing the First Hungarian General Insurance Company

Baron Henrik Lévay de Kistelek (Hungarian: kisteleki báró Lévay Henrik; Jánoshalma, 16 April 1826 – Budapest, 15 December 1901) was a Hungarian businessman. By establishing the First Hungarian General Insurance Company (Első Magyar Általános Biztosító Társaság) in 1857, he introduced the insurance industry in Hungary (then part of the Austrian Empire).

== Early life ==
The second son of József Lévay (d. 1862) and Mária Herczel (d. 1858), Henrik was born into a Jewish family in Jánoshalma in the southern part of the Kingdom of Hungary. He took part in the Hungarian Revolution of 1848, and fought as a lieutenant in the revolutionary Hungarian Defence Forces. After the fall of the revolution, he was employed by the Riunione Adriatice insurance company. He married Róza Sárkány on 5 September 1852.

== Businessman ==
Lévay established the First Hungarian General Insurance Company, founding the insurance industry in Hungary in 1857. King Franz Joseph I (r. 1848–1916) awarded him with nobility on 25 August 1868. As many other ennobled Jews, he converted to Christianity. He was made a baron on 22 April 1897. He died childless in Budapest on 15 December 1901. Five days later he was buried in Táplány (now in Töltéstava).

== Sources ==
- Patai, Raphael (2015). The Jews of Hungary: History, Culture, Psychology. Wayne State University Press. ISBN 978-0-8143-2561-2.
- Gudenus, János József (1993). A magyarországi főnemesség XX. századi genealógiája, II. kötet (K–O) [The 20th-century Genealogy of the Hungarian Aristocracy, Volume II (K–O)]. Tellér Kft. ISBN 963-8178-00-0.
