= Social Insurance Agency =

Defunct Japanese public welfare agency

Coordinates: 35.673°N 139.749°E

The Social Insurance Agency (社会保険庁, Shakaihoken-chō) was an agency administered by the Japanese Ministry of Health, Labor, and Welfare. After a scandal involving millions of lost pension records, on January 1, 2010, it was abolished and replaced by the Japan Pension Service.

It was responsible for four types of social insurance:

- Employees’ Health Insurance
- Seamens' Insurance
- Employees’ Pension Insurance
- The National Pension.

== Pension records problem ==
The Social Insurance Agency computerized their records in 1979 and in 1997 the SIA attempted to integrate three different databases together. Numerous problems resulted from this and in May 2007 it was exposed by the then-opposition party, the Democratic Party of Japan that 50 million pre-1997 premium payers could not be matched to any citizen enrolled in the system. The then-ruling party, the Liberal Democratic Party, subsequently suffered a loss in the 2007 election, which was partly attributed to the pension scandal.

By January 2010, 14 million of these 50 million records had been consolidated with an existing pension number.
