= Japan Pension Service =

Government organization in Japan

Coordinates: 35.673°N 139.749°E

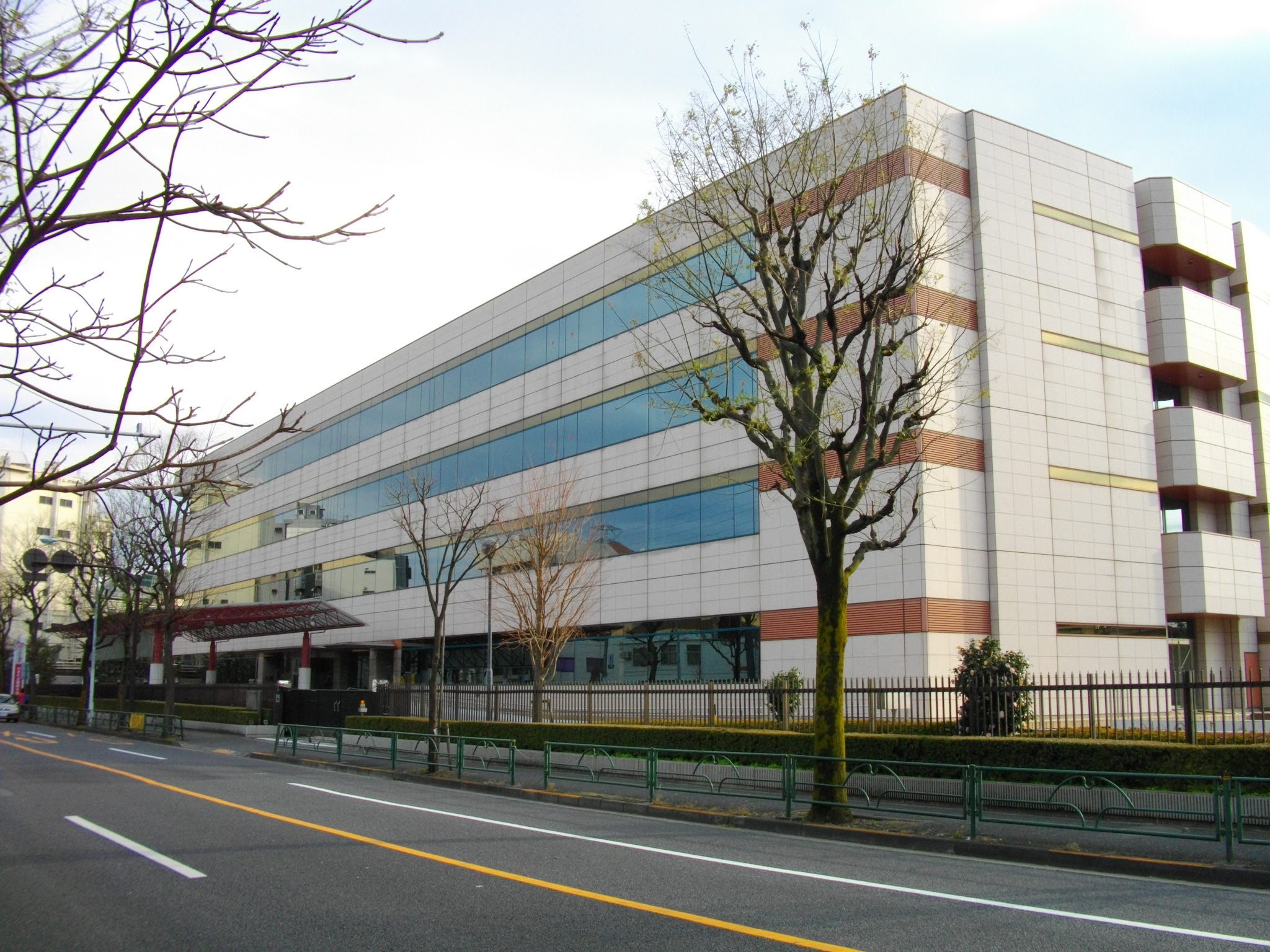
Japan Pension Service Headquarters

The Japan Pension Service (日本年金機構, Nihon nenkin kikō) is a government organization administered by the Ministry of Health, Labour and Welfare. On January 1, 2010, it replaced the Social Insurance Agency.

== Organization ==
It is a special public corporation with a non-governmental employees headquarters, nine regional headquarters, and 312 branch offices. It has 47 processing centers, which are planned to be integrated into the 9 regional headquarters. The President of the JPS is Toichiro Mizushima, and it has around 27,000 total staff, 15,000 full-time staff and 12,000 temporary workers.

== Responsibilities ==
The JPS is responsible for managing all tasks related to the public pension system:

- Handling applications
- Collecting contributions
- Keeping records
- Pension consultations
- Paying benefits

== Pension records problem ==
The Social Insurance Agency, the predecessor to the Japan Pension Service, computerized their records in 1979 and in 1997 the SIA attempted to integrate three different databases together. Numerous problems resulted from this and in May 2007 it was exposed by the then-opposition party, the Democratic Party of Japan that 50 million pre-1997 premium payers could not be matched to any citizen enrolled in the system. The then-ruling party, the Liberal Democratic Party, subsequently suffered a loss in the 2007 election, which was partly attributed to the pension scandal.

By January 2010, 14 million of these 50 million records had been consolidated with an existing pension number.

Between the period April 1964 to December 1981, non-Japanese were not allowed to join the National Pension System.

== Issues with nonpayment of pension ==
Under the new system when the JPS was launched in January 2010, the organization is allowed to delegate to the National Tax Agency authority to forcibly collect unpaid pension premiums, but this has not been occurring. Analysts attributed it to squabbles between the Ministry of Health, Labor, and Welfare, under which the JPS operates, and the Ministry of Finance, under which the National Tax Agency works. The ratio of people continuing to pay their national pension premiums has been dropping, falling to 56% as of October 2011. The number of companies failing to make pension payments hit 162,400 nationwide in 2010.

More than 100,000 businesses have refused to join the program in the three years up to 2012. JPS staff have visited non-compliant businesses and sent notices urging them to join the program. In some cases it has forced businesses to join. It was announced in May 2012 that the Ministry of Health, Labor, and Welfare would file a complaint with police and publish the names of the offending companies. The Employees' Pension Insurance Act stipulates a prison term of up to six months or a fine of up to 500,000 yen for any violator of the law, but the law has rarely been applied.

== Social Problems with pension system ==
Under the national pension plan, a wife who earns less than 1.30 million yen ($13,000) annually has not had to pay for any type of pension plan but has been entitled to receive a pension as a dependent of her employed husband. In other words, the pension system works to the advantage of full-time housewives, who receive survivors’ benefits without ever having contributed to the National Pension fund. This has led to complaints from working women that it is unfair that women who have not contributed to pension, receive money from pension fund. The problem we have in the Japanese Pension system is that it is based on the traditional conservative family (the man is working, the woman is not working and is taking care of the children).

The amount of national pension people who are older than 65 (who did full contribution) can get is 779,300JPY/ year, which is not enough by normal living standards. Usually, people combine both corporate pension and national pension to survive. However, since a corporate pension is not always available, there are a growing number of the elderly on welfare due to insufficient amount of pension money received. The rate of relative poverty for the people over age 65 is 21% while the OECD average is 13% (2007). So this Japanese system of elderly dependence on both national pension and corporate pension has led to an increase in relative poverty as some of them do not have access to corporate pensions.

Lastly, Japan is facing an aging population. Between 1975 and 1980, the fertility rate in Japan was 1.83 children per woman (OECD average − 2.26). In the period of 2005-2010, the fertility rate fell to 1.27 (average of OECD – 1.69). At the same time, Japan’s life expectancy (upon retirement age) in 2010 was 19.8 years for men (OECD average − 18.5 years) and according to the demographic projections, life expectancy in Japan will increase up to 21.6 years for men. In other words, as the working population is forecasted to shrink further, Japan’s pension system will rely on a smaller base of contributors. And there will be more spending as the number of elderly increases. In 2001, the amount of public old-age pensions received per elderly person was 17 times larger than social spending per person under the age of 65. Thus, the Japanese pension system is having a serious issue with the aging population.

== See also ==
- Ministry of Health, Labour and Welfare
- Social Insurance Agency
- National Pension (Japan)—mentions International (bilateral) Social Security Agreements
- Family policy in Japan
