= Pension insurance contract =

A pension insurance contract is an insurance contract under which contributions are paid to an insurance undertaking in exchange for pension benefits that are payable when plan members reach retirement age or leave the plan earlier.

== See also ==
- Pension fund
