= Ethnicity (disambiguation) =

Ethnicity is a social group's shared characteristics, attributes, and background which distinguishes them from other groups.

Ethnicity may also refer to:

- Ethnicity (United States census), ethnicity as defined by the US census
- Ethnicity (United Kingdom), ethnicity in the United Kingdom
- Mono-ethnicity, singular ethnic identity
- Metro-ethnicity, one of more recent concepts in ethnic studies
- Symbolic ethnicity, symbolic attachment to a particular ethnicity
- Supra-ethnicity, designation for several complex phenomena, "above" the level of basic ethnicity:
  - Poly-ethnicity, pluralistic ethnic identity
  - Pan-ethnicity, a particular concept in ethnic studies
  - Meta-ethnicity, one of more recent concepts in ethnic studies
- Ethnicities (journal), an academic journal
- Ethnicity (album), an album by Yanni

== See also ==
- Ethnicity theory
- Ethnic studies
- Ethnix, an Israeli new wave band
