= Supraethnicity =

Supraethnicity (from Latin prefix supra- / "above" and Ancient Greek word ἔθνος / "ethnos = people") is a scholarly neologism, used mainly in social sciences as a formal designation for a particular structural category that lies "above" the basic level of ethnicity. It is often paired with subethnicity, a similar technical term with the exact opposite meaning, also designating a particular structural category, but that which lies "under" the level of ethnicity. Both terms are used in ethnic studies in order to describe structural and functional relations between basic (common) form of ethnic identity and various related phenomena that are classified as belonging to "higher" (supraethnic) or "lower" (subethnic) levels. Formally, both categories (supraethnic and subethnic) are designating levels, not the contents. For example, there are several distinctive phenomena that are manifested on the supraethnic level, like: metaethnicity, multiethnicity (pluriethnicity), panethnicity, polyethnicity, or transethnicity, each of them having their own distinctive contents, but all of them sharing the same structural "supraethnic" level. There have been attempts to define some common, not only structural but also functional properties of supraethnicity, but such attempts were challenged by the present state of terminological diversity and inconsistency within the ethnic studies.

== See also ==
- Ethnic studies
- Ethnicity
- Metaethnicity
- Metroethnicity
- Monoethnicity
- Panethnicity
- Polyethnicity
- Symbolic ethnicity

== Sources ==
- Bereketeab, Redie (2002). "Supra-ethnic nationalism: The case of Eritrea". African Sociological Review. 6 (2): 137–152. doi:10.4314/asr.v6i2.23218.
- Fishman, Joshua A. (2010). "Ethnicity and supra‐ethnicity in corpus planning: The hidden status agenda in corpus planning". Nations and Nationalism. 10 (1–2): 79–94. doi:10.1111/j.1354-5078.2004.00156.x.
- Godina, Vesna V. (2007). "Supra-ethnic identity in multiethnic societies: The case of Yugoslav multiethnic identity". Ethnoculture. 1: 59–71.
- Leman, Johan (1999). "Religions, modulators in pluri‐ethnic cities: An anthropological analysis of the relative shift from ethnic to supra‐ethnic and meta‐ethnic faith communities in Brussels". Journal of Contemporary Religion. 14 (2): 217–231. doi:10.1080/13537909908580863.
- Okamoto, Dina G. (2003). "Towards a Theory of Panethnicity: Explaining Asian American Collective Action". American Sociological Review. 68 (6): 811–842. doi:10.2307/1519747. JSTOR 1519747.
- Okamoto, Dina G. (2008). "Panethnic Identity". Encyclopedia of Race, Ethnicity, and Society. Vol. 2. Los Angeles: SAGE Publications. pp. 1019–1022. ISBN 9781412926942.
- Okamoto, Dina G.; Mora, Cristina (2014). "Panethnicity". Annual Review of Sociology. 40: 219–239. doi:10.1146/annurev-soc-071913-043201.
- Rees, Kristoffer M.; Webb Williams, Nora (2017). "Explaining Kazakhstani identity: Supraethnic identity, ethnicity, language, and citizenship". Nationalities Papers. 45 (5): 815–839. doi:10.1080/00905992.2017.1288204. S2CID 157620594.
- Reifowitz, Ian (2003). Imagining an Austrian Nation: Joseph Samuel Bloch and the Search for a Supraethnic Austrian Identity, 1846-1918. New York: Columbia University Press.
