= Latin Americans =

Citizens of Latin American countries

Total population
- 680,000,000 or more (in 2021)

Regions with significant populations
- Latin America; 656,098,097
- Brazil: 214,326,223
- Mexico: 126,705,138
- Colombia: 51,516,562
- Argentina: 45,276,780
- Peru: 33,715,471
- Venezuela: 28,199,867
- Chile: 19,493,184
- Guatemala: 17,608,483
- Ecuador: 17,797,737
- Bolivia: 12,079,472
- Haiti: 11,447,569
- Cuba: 11,256,372
- Dominican Republic: 11,117,873
- Honduras: 10,278,345
- Nicaragua: 6,850,540
- Paraguay: 6,703,799
- El Salvador: 6,314,167
- Costa Rica: 5,153,957
- Panama: 4,351,267
- Uruguay: 3,426,260
- Puerto Rico: 3,256,028
- Guadeloupe: 396,051
- Martinique: 368,796
- French Guiana: 297,449
- United States: +62,000,000
- Spain: + 4,600,000
- France: 1,333,000
- Canada: 580,235
- Italy: 354,180
- Japan: +345,000
- Germany: 206,094
- United Kingdom: 186,500
- Portugal: ~100,000
- Australia: 93,795
- Sweden: 88,175
- New Zealand: 38,742

Languages
- Primarily Spanish and Portuguese; Regionally Quechua, Mayan languages, Guaraní, Aymara, Nahuatl and others

Religion
- Roman Catholic 69%; Protestant 19%; Irreligious 8%; Other 4%

Latin Americans (Spanish: Latinoamericanos; Portuguese: Latino-americanos; French: Latino-américains) are the citizens of Latin American countries, or people with cultural, ancestral or national origins in Latin America.

Latin American countries and their diasporas are multi-ethnic and multi-racial. Latin Americans are a pan-ethnicity consisting of people of different ethnic and national backgrounds. As a result, many Latin Americans do not take their nationality as an ethnicity, but identify themselves with a combination of their nationality, ethnicity and their ancestral origins. In addition to the indigenous population, Latin Americans include people with Old World ancestors who arrived since 1492. Latin America has the largest diasporas of Spaniards, Portuguese, Africans, Italians, Lebanese and Japanese in the world. The region also has large German (second largest after the United States), French, Palestinian (largest outside the Arab states), Chinese and Jewish diasporas.

The specific ethnic and/or racial composition varies from country to country and diaspora community to diaspora community: many have a predominance of mixed indigenous and European descent or mestizo, population; in others, Indigenous Amerindians are a majority; some are mostly inhabited by people of European ancestry; others are primarily mulatto. The largest single group are white Latin Americans. Together with the people of part European ancestry, they combine for almost the totality of the population.

Latin Americans and their descendants can be found almost everywhere in the world, particularly in densely populated urban areas. The most important migratory destinations for Latin Americans are found in the United States, Spain, France, Canada, Italy and Japan.

== Definition ==
Latin American countries (green) in the Americas

Latin America (Spanish: América Latina or Latinoamérica; Portuguese: América Latina; French: Amérique latine) is the region of the Americas where Romance languages (i.e., those derived from Latin)—particularly Spanish and Portuguese, as well as French—are primarily spoken.

It includes 21 countries or territories: Mexico in North America; Guatemala, Honduras, El Salvador, Nicaragua, Costa Rica and Panama in Central America; Colombia, Venezuela, Ecuador, Peru, Bolivia, Brazil, Paraguay, Chile, Argentina and Uruguay in South America; and Cuba, Haiti, the Dominican Republic and Puerto Rico in the Caribbean—in summary, Hispanic America plus Brazil and Haiti. Canada and the United States, despite having sizeable Romance-speaking communities, are almost never included in the definition, primarily for being predominantly English-speaking Anglosphere countries. The ABC islands (Leeward Antilles), where the primary language is Papiamento, a Portuguese Creole, may or may not be considered part of Latin America.

Latin America, therefore, can be defined as all those parts of the Americas that were once part of the Spanish, Portuguese or French colonial empires, namely Spanish America, Colonial Brazil and New France.

== Demographics ==
=== Ethnic and racial groups ===
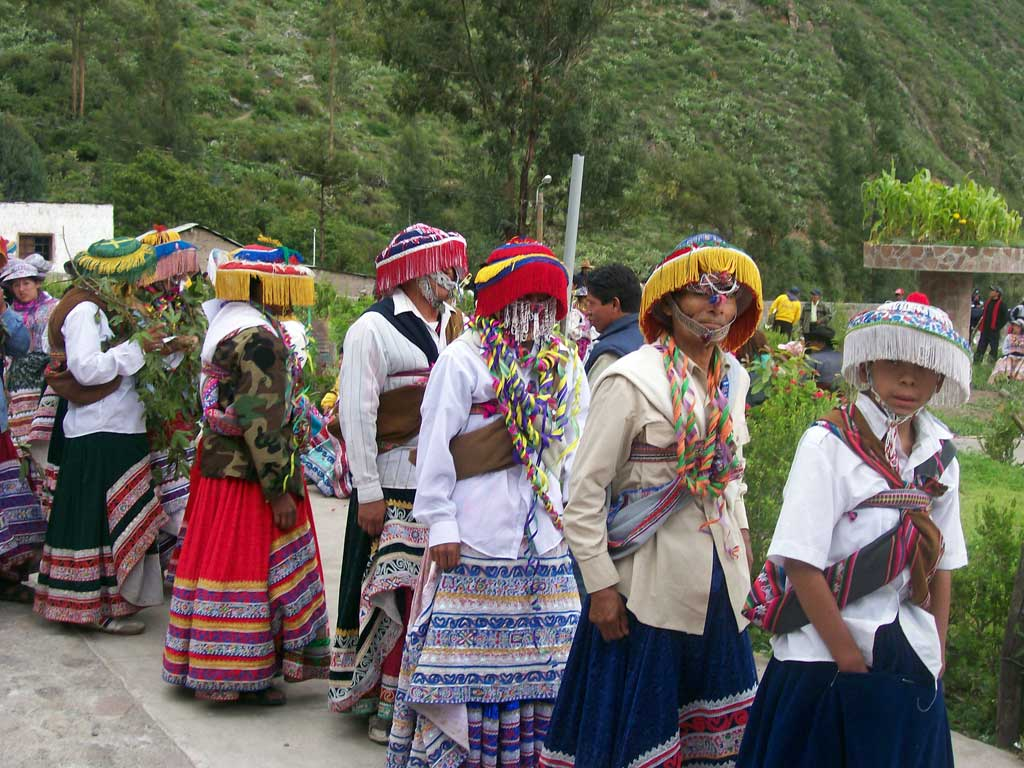
Wititi dancers from Colca Canyon, Peru. Indigenous people make up most of the population in Bolivia and Guatemala, and a quarter in Peru

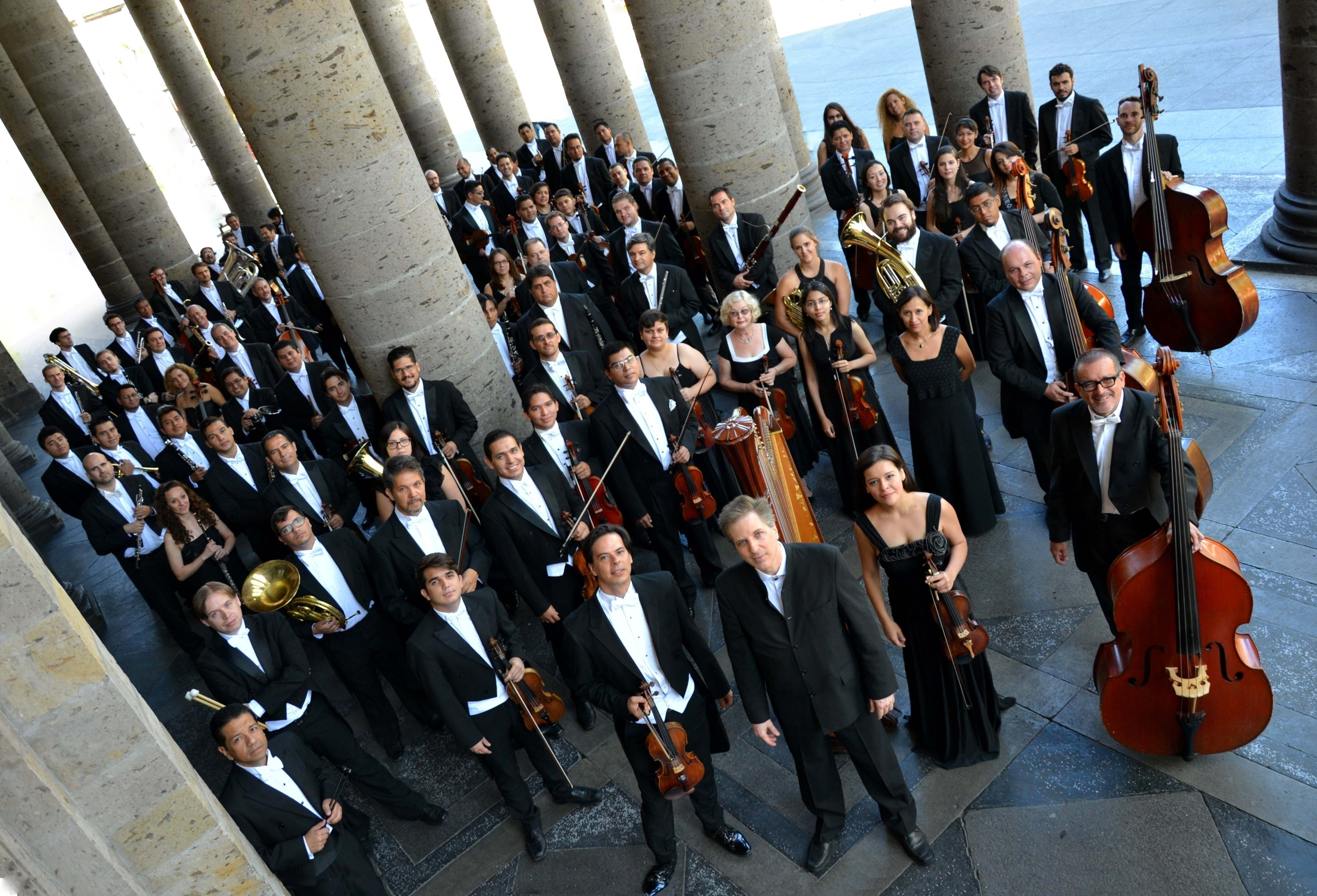
Mexican musicians from the Jalisco Philharmonic Orchestra. Mestizos comprise the majority of Mexicans

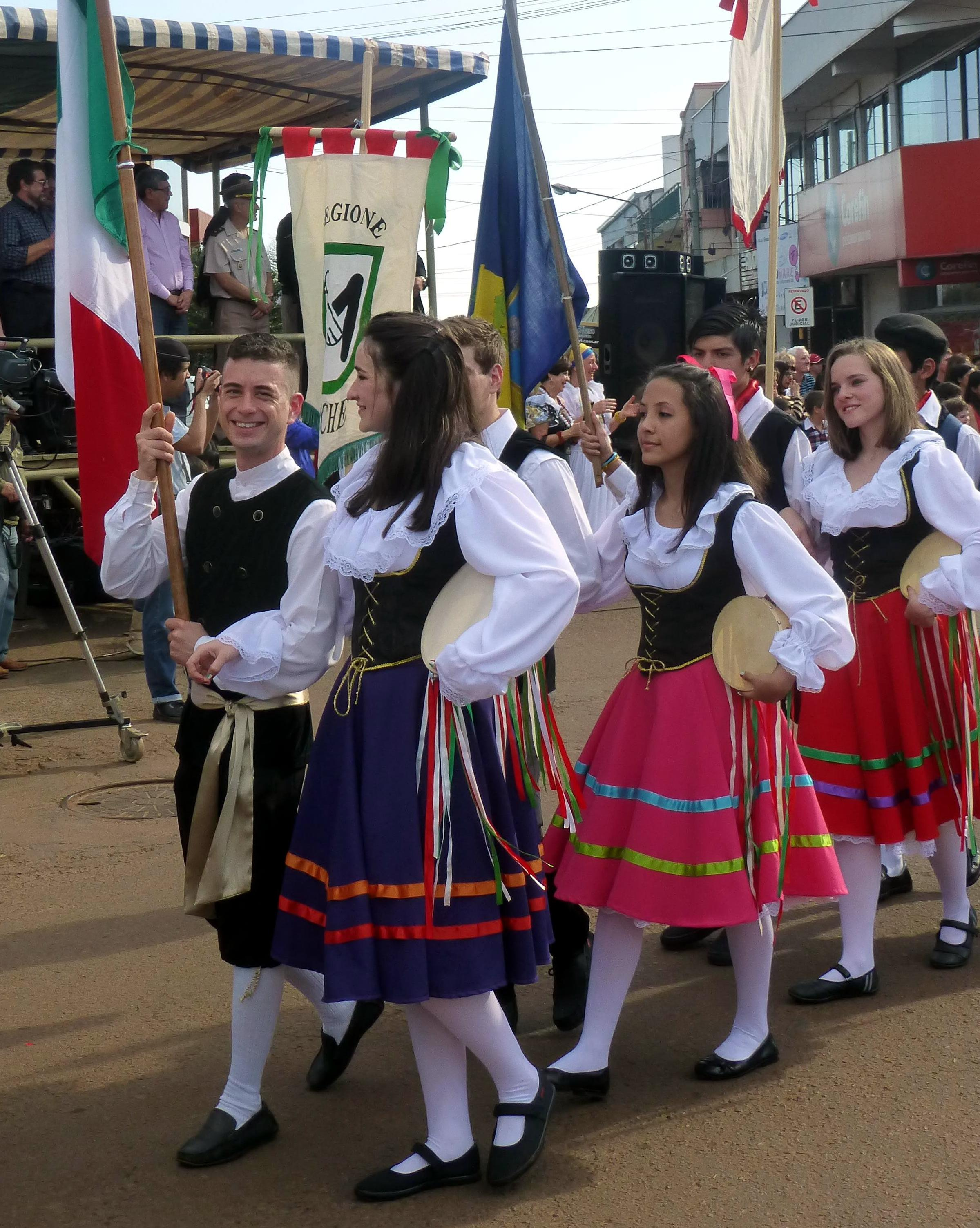
Italian Argentine youths in Oberá. Over 60% of Argentina's population has some degree of Italian ancestry

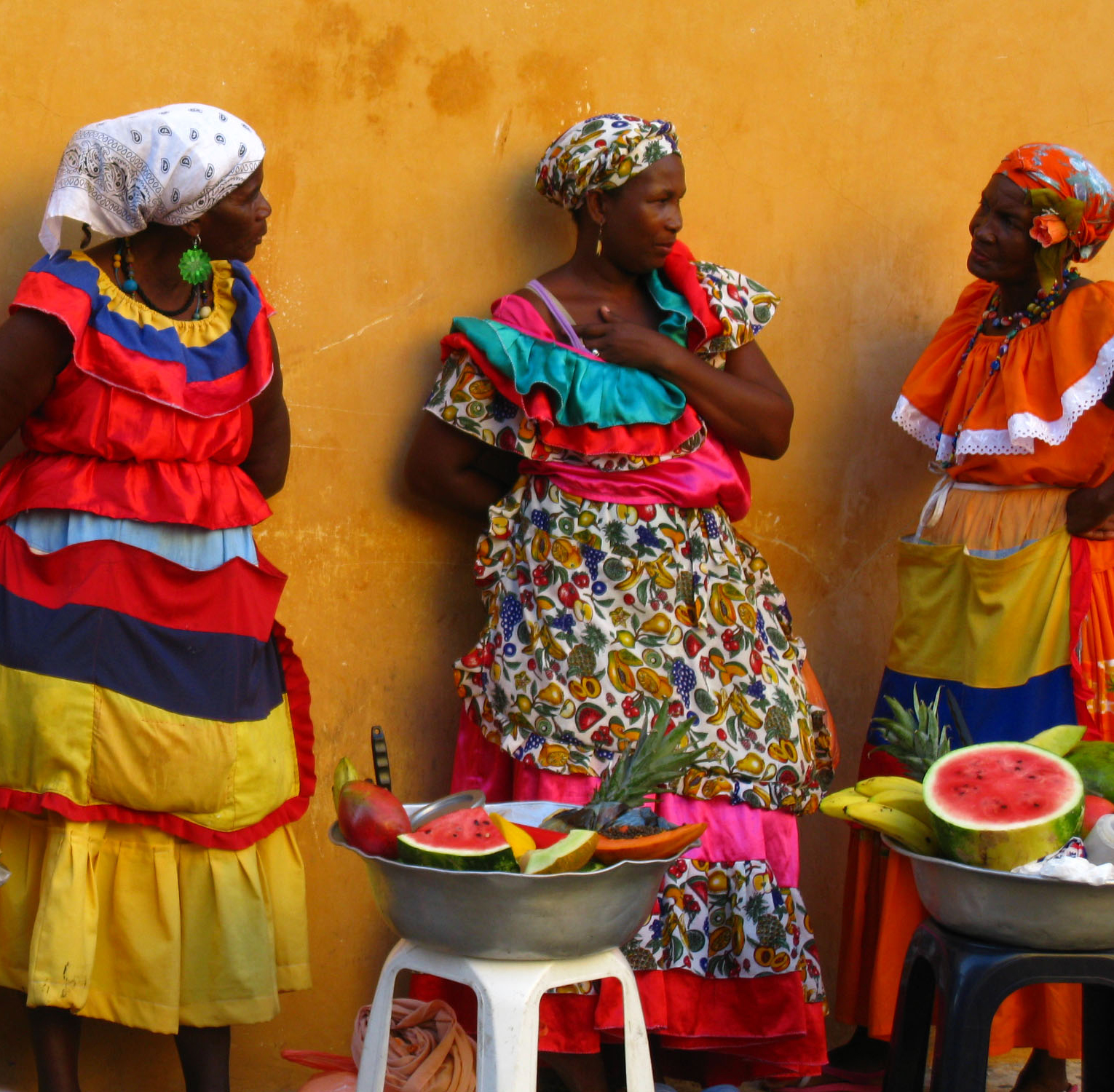
Afro-Colombian fruit sellers in Cartagena

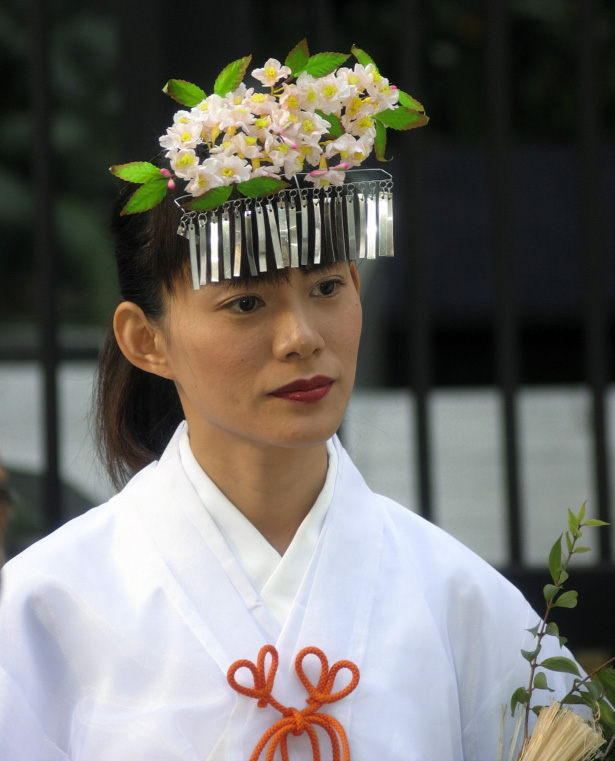
Woman from Curitiba, one of over a million Japanese Brazilians

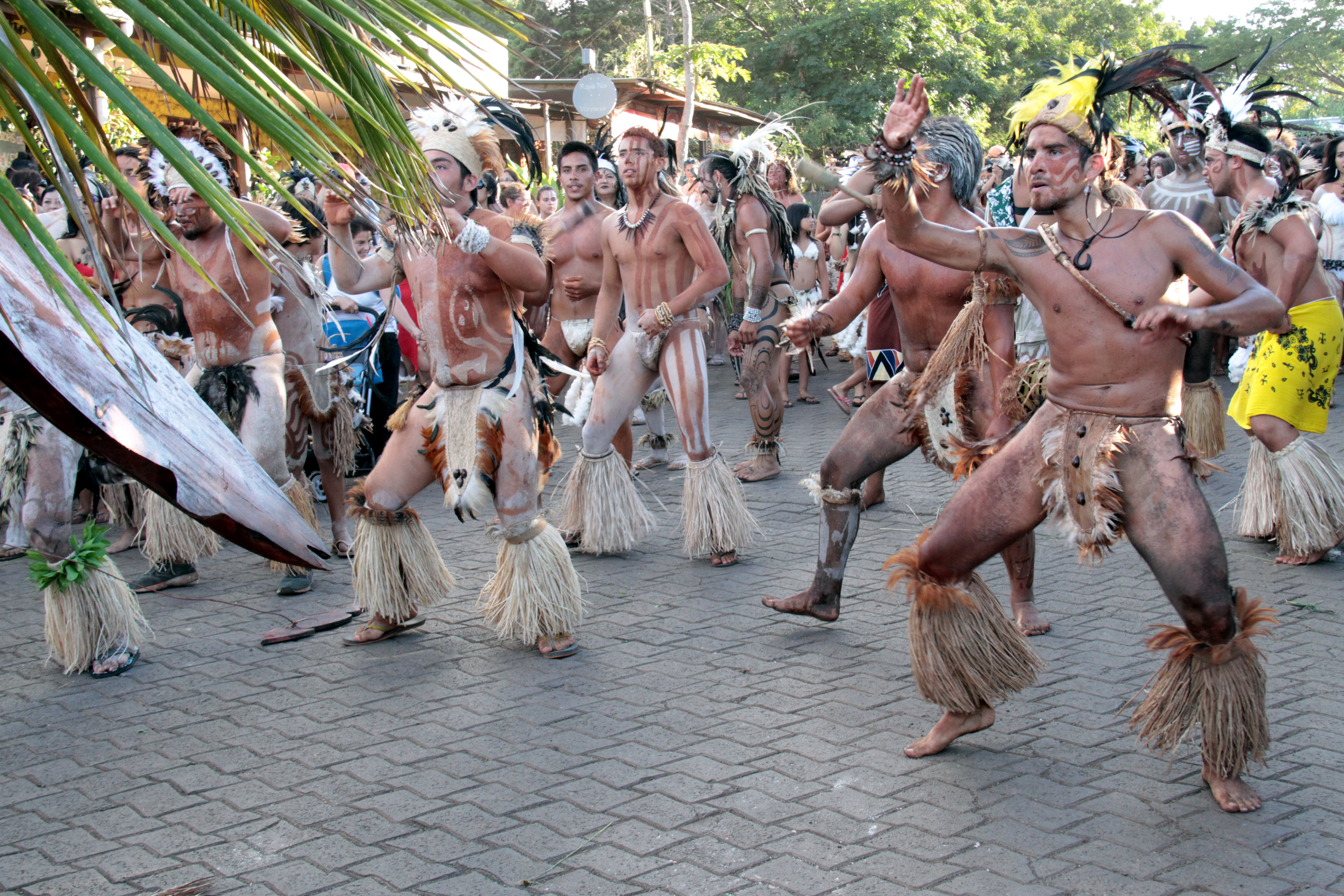
Rapa Nui dancers from Easter Island, Chile. The Rapa Nui are a Polynesian people

The population of Latin America comprises a variety of ancestries, ethnic groups and races, making the region one of the most diverse in the world. The specific composition varies from country to country: many have a predominance of mixed European and Amerindian, or mestizo, population; in others, Amerindians are a majority; some are dominated by inhabitants of European ancestry; and some countries' populations are primarily mulatto. White Latin Americans are the largest single group, accounting for more than one-third of the population. Black, Asian, and zambo (mixed black and Amerindian) minorities are also identified regularly.

- Mestizos: Intermixing between Europeans and Amerindians began early in the colonial period and was extensive. The resulting people, known as mestizos, make up the majority of the population in half of the countries of Latin America. Additionally, mestizos comprise large minorities in nearly all the other mainland countries.
- Whites: Beginning in the late 15th century, large numbers of Iberian colonists settled in what became Latin America (Portuguese in Brazil and Spaniards elsewhere in the region), and at present most white Latin Americans are of Spanish, Portuguese and Italian ancestry. Iberians brought the Spanish and Portuguese languages, the Catholic faith, and many Iberian traditions. Brazil, Mexico, Argentina, Colombia and Venezuela contain the largest numbers of Europeans in Latin America in pure numbers. They make up the majority of the population of Argentina, Chile, Costa Rica, Cuba and Uruguay and roughly half of Brazil's and Venezuela's population. Of the millions of immigrants since most of Latin America gained independence in the 1810s–1820s, Italians formed the largest group, and next were Spaniards and Portuguese. Many others arrived, such as French, Germans, Greeks, Poles, Ukrainians, Russians, Croats, Serbs, Latvians, Lithuanians, English, Jews, Irish and Welsh. Most Latin Americans have some degree of European ancestry, when taking into account those of either mixed or full European descent.
- Amerindians: The indigenous population of Latin America arrived during the Lithic stage. In post-Columbian times, they experienced tremendous population decline, particularly in the early decades of colonization. They have since recovered in numbers, surpassing sixty million (by some estimates), though, with the growth of the other groups, they now comprise a majority only in Bolivia. In Guatemala, Amerindians are a large minority that comprises 41% of the population. Mexico's 21% (9.8% in the official 2005 census) is the next largest ratio, and one of the largest indigenous population in the Americas in absolute numbers. Most of the remaining countries have Amerindians minorities, in every case making up less than one-tenth of the respective country's population. In many countries, people of mixed indigenous and European ancestry, known as mestizos, make up the majority of the population.
- Asians: People of Asian descent number several million in Latin America. The majority of Asian descendants in the country are either of West Asian (such as Lebanese or Syrian) or East Asian (like Chinese or Japanese) descent. The first Asians to settle in the region were Filipino, as a result of Spain's trade involving Asia and the Americas. The Brazilian Institute of Geography and Statistics states that the country's largest Asian communities are from West Asia and East Asia. It is estimated that 7 to 10 million Brazilians are of Lebanese descent. Around 2 million Brazilians self-identify as being "Yellow" (amarela or of East Asian descent) according to the 2010 census. The country is home to the largest ethnic Japanese community outside Japan itself, estimated as high as 1.5 million, and circa 200,000 ethnic Chinese and 100,000 ethnic Koreans. Ethnic Koreans also number tens of thousands of individuals in Argentina and Mexico. The 2017 census stated that under 40,000 Peruvians self-identified as having Chinese or Japanese ancestry. Though other estimates claim as much as 1.47 million people of East Asian descent reside in the country. Lebanese and Syrian descendants have also formed notable communities in countries like Mexico and Argentina. The Martiniquais population includes a mixed African, European and Amerindian descent, and an East Indian (Asian Indian) population is also present in Martinique. In Guadeloupe, an estimated 14% of the population is of East Asian descent.
- Mulattoes: Mulattoes are people of mixed European and African ancestry, mostly descended from Spanish, Portuguese, or French settlers on one side and African slaves on the other, during the colonial period. Brazil is home to Latin America's largest mulatto population. Mulattoes form a majority in the Dominican Republic and are also numerous in Cuba, Puerto Rico, Nicaragua, Panama, Peru, Colombia, and Ecuador. Smaller populations of mulattoes are found in other Latin American countries.
- Blacks: Millions of African slaves were brought to Latin America from the 16th century onward, most of whom were sent to the Caribbean region and Brazil. Today, people identified as "black" are most numerous in Brazil (more than 20 million) and in Haiti (more than 9 million). Significant populations are also found in Cuba, Dominican Republic, Puerto Rico, Panama and Colombia. Latin Americans of mixed black and white ancestry, called mulattoes, are far more numerous than blacks.
- Zambos: Intermixing between blacks and Amerindians was especially prevalent in Colombia and Brazil, often due to slaves running away (becoming cimarrones: maroons) and being taken in by indigenous villagers. In Spanish-speaking nations, people of this mixed ancestry are known as zambos, and they are also known as cafuzos in Brazil.
- Multi-ethnic/Multi-racials: In addition to the foregoing groups, Latin America also has millions of peoples who belong to multiracial backgrounds.

Racial distribution, in 2005 - Population estimates, as of 2021
Country	Population	Mestizos	Whites	Amerindians	Mulattoes	Blacks	Zambos	Asians
Argentina	45,276,780	11.1%	85.0%	1.0%	0.0%	0.0%	0.0%	2.9%
Bolivia	12,079,472	28.0%	15.0%	55.0%	2.0%	0.0%	0.0%	0.0%
Brazil	214,326,223	19.4%	47.7%	0.4%	19.1%	6.2%	0.0%	1.1%
Chile	19,493,184	44.0%	53.0%	3.0%	0.0%	0.0%	0.0%	0.0%
Colombia	51,516,562	53.2%	20.0%	1.8%	21%	3.9%	0.1%	0.0%
Costa Rica	5,153,957	15.0%	82.0%	0.8%	0.0%	0.0%	2.0%	0.2%
Cuba	11,256,372	0.0%	62.0%	0.0%	27.6%	11.0%	0.0%	1.0%
Dominican Republic	11,117,873	0.0%	14.6%	0.0%	75.0%	7.7%	2.3%	0.4%
Ecuador	17,797,737	41.0%	9.9%	39.0%	5.0%	5.0%	0.0%	0.1%
El Salvador	6,314,167	86.0%	12.0%	1.0%	0.0%	0.0%	0.0%	0.0%
Guatemala	17,608,483	41.0%	6.9%	50.9%	0.0%	0.0%	0.2%	0.8%
Honduras	10,278,345	85.1%	1.9%	7.7%	1.6%	0.0%	3.9%	0.7%
Mexico	126,705,138	70%	15%	14%	0.5%	0.0%	0.0%	0.5%
Nicaragua	6,850,540	69%	17%	5%	6%	3%	0.6%	0.2%
Panama	4,351,267	32.0%	10.0%	8.0%	27.0%	5.0%	14.0%	4.0%
Paraguay	6,703,799	90.5%	3.5%	1.5%	3.5%	0.0%	0.0%	0.5%
Peru	33,715,471	32.0%	12.0%	45.5%	9.7%	0.0%	0.0%	0.8%
Puerto Rico (Note: Note: Puerto Rico is a territory of the United States.)	3,285,874	2.3%	17.1%	0.5%	10.5%	7.0%	0.0%	0.1%
Uruguay	3,426,260	4.0%	88.0%	0.0%	8.0%	0.0%	0.0%	0.0%
Venezuela	28,199,867	42.9%	42.2%	2.7%	0.7%	2.8%	0.0%	2.2%
Total	635,457,371	30.3%	36.1%	9.2%	20.3%	3.2%	0.2%	0.7%

=== Racial groups according to self-identification ===
The Latinobarómetro surveys have asked respondents in 18 Latin American countries what race they considered themselves to belong to. The figures shown below are averages for 2007 through 2011.

Country	Mestizo	White	Amerindian	Mulatto	Black	Asian	Other	DK/NR^{1}
Argentina	15%	73%	1%	1%	1%	0%	3%	7%
Bolivia	40%	6%	47%	1%	0%	0%	1%	4%
Brazil	18%	45%	2%	15%	15%	2%	0%	2%
Chile	26%	60%	7%	0%	0%	1%	1%	5%
Colombia	43%	29%	5%	5%	7%	0%	1%	9%
Costa Rica	16%	66%	3%	9%	2%	1%	1%	5%
Dominican Republic	28%	16%	5%	23%	25%	2%	0%	2%
Ecuador	78%	5%	7%	3%	3%	1%	0%	3%
El Salvador	62%	14%	5%	3%	2%	1%	2%	11%
Guatemala	29%	17%	44%	2%	1%	1%	2%	6%
Honduras	61%	9%	12%	3%	3%	2%	1%	10%
Mexico	60%	15%	15%	2%	0%	1%	3%	4%
Nicaragua	54%	19%	7%	3%	4%	1%	1%	11%
Panama	55%	15%	5%	5%	11%	4%	1%	4%
Paraguay	36%	35%	2%	1%	1%	0%	4%	20%
Peru	72%	12%	7%	2%	1%	0%	1%	5%
Uruguay	6%	80%	1%	3%	2%	0%	2%	6%
Venezuela	45%	40%	4%	3%	2%	1%	0%	5%
Weighted average^{2}	34%	33%	11%	8%	6%	0%	2%	7%

^{1} Don't know/No response.
^{2} Weighted using 2011 population.

=== Language ===
Linguistic map of Latin America. Spanish in green, Portuguese in orange, and French in blue

Spanish and Portuguese are the predominant languages of Latin America. Spanish is the official language of most of the countries on the Latin American mainland, as well as in Puerto Rico (where it is co-official with English), Cuba and the Dominican Republic. Portuguese is spoken only in Brazil, the biggest and most populous country in the region. French is spoken in Haiti, as well as in the French overseas departments of French Guiana in South America and Guadeloupe and Martinique in the Caribbean. Dutch is the official language of some Caribbean islands and in Suriname on the continent; however, as Dutch is a Germanic language, these territories are not considered part of Latin America.

Indigenous languages are widely spoken in Peru, Guatemala, Bolivia and Paraguay, and, to a lesser degree, in Mexico, Chile and Ecuador. In Latin American countries not named above, the population of speakers of indigenous languages is small or non-existent.

In Peru, Quechua is an official language, alongside Spanish and any other indigenous language in the areas where they predominate. In Ecuador, while holding no official status, the closely related Quichua is a recognized language of the indigenous people under the country's constitution; however, it is only spoken by a few groups in the country's highlands. In Bolivia, Aymara, Quechua and Guaraní hold official status alongside Spanish. Guarani is, along with Spanish, an official language of Paraguay, and is spoken by a majority of the population (who are, for the most part, bilingual), and it is co-official with Spanish in the Argentine province of Corrientes. In Nicaragua, Spanish is the official language, but, on the country's Caribbean coast English and indigenous languages such as Miskito, Sumo, and Rama also hold official status. Colombia recognizes all indigenous languages spoken within its territory as official, though fewer than 1% of its population are native speakers of these. Nahuatl is one of the 62 native languages spoken by indigenous people in Mexico that are officially recognized by the government as "national languages" along with Spanish.

Other European languages spoken in Latin America include: English, by some groups in Argentina, Chile, Costa Rica, Nicaragua, Panama and Puerto Rico, as well as in nearby countries that may or may not be considered Latin American, such as Belize and Guyana; English is also used as a major foreign language in Latin American commerce and education. Other languages spoken in parts of Latin America include German in southern Brazil, southern Chile, Argentina, portions of northern Venezuela and Paraguay; Italian in Brazil, Argentina, Uruguay and Venezuela; Polish, Ukrainian and Russian in southern Brazil; and Welsh in southern Argentina. Hebrew and Yiddish are used by Jewish diasporas in Argentina and Brazil.

In several nations, especially in the Caribbean region, creole languages are spoken. The most widely spoken creole language in the Caribbean and Latin America in general is Haitian Creole, the predominant language of Haiti; it is derived primarily from French and certain West African tongues with indigenous, English, Portuguese and Spanish influences as well. The other most spoken Creole is Antillean Creole French that is primarily spoken in the Lesser Antilles. It is a French-based creole, that is the local language spoken among the natives of the Caribbean islands of Saint Lucia and Dominica and also in Martinique and Guadeloupe. Creole languages of mainland Latin America, similarly, are derived from European languages and various African tongues.

=== Religion ===
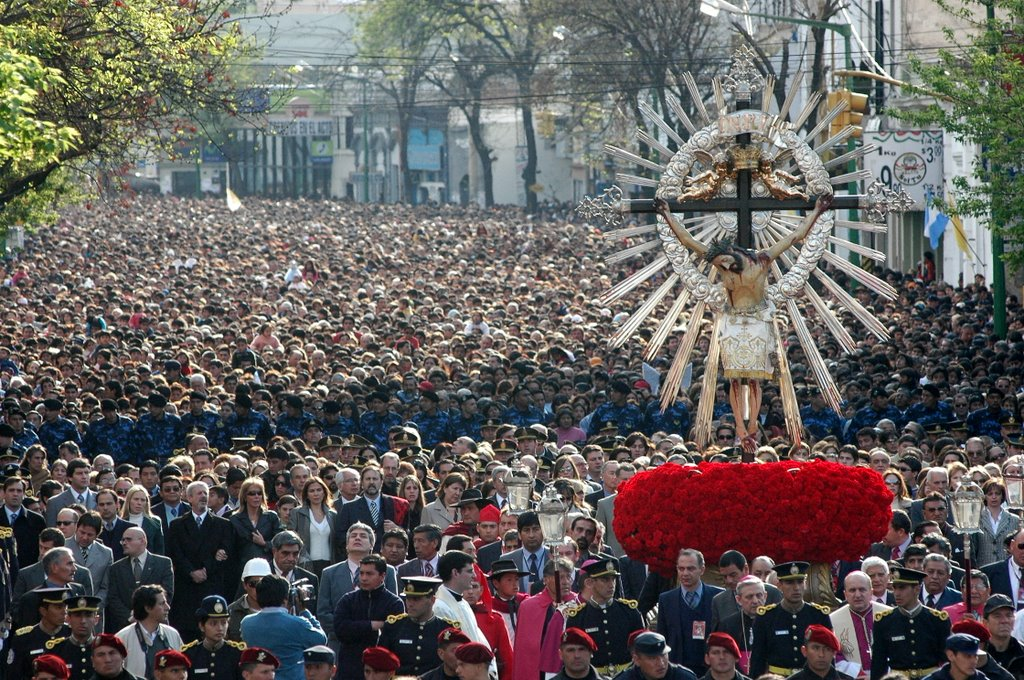
Procession of Our Lord and the Virgin of the Miracle in Salta city.

The vast majority of Latin Americans are Christians (90%), mostly Roman Catholics. About 71% of the Latin American population consider themselves Catholic. Membership in Protestant denominations is increasing, particularly in Brazil, Guatemala and Puerto Rico. Argentina hosts the largest communities of both Jews and Muslims in Latin America. Indigenous religions and rituals are practiced in countries with large indigenous populations, especially Bolivia, Guatemala, Mexico and Peru, and Afro-Latin American religions such as Santería, Candomblé, Umbanda, Macumba and Vodou are practiced in countries with large Afro-Latin American populations, especially Cuba, Brazil, Dominican Republic and Haiti. Latin America constitutes, in absolute terms, the world's second largest Christian population, after Europe.

=== Migration ===
According to the 2005 Colombian census or DANE, about 3,331,107 Colombians currently live abroad. The number of Brazilians living overseas is estimated at 2 million people. An estimated 1.5 to two million Salvadorians reside in the United States. At least 1.5 million Ecuadorians have gone abroad, mainly to the United States and Spain. Approximately 1.5 million Dominicans live abroad, mostly in the United States. More than 1.3 million Cubans live abroad, most of them in the United States. It is estimated that over 800,000 Chileans live abroad, mainly in Argentina, Canada, United States and Spain. Other Chilean nationals may be located in countries like Costa Rica, Mexico and Sweden. An estimated 700,000 Bolivians were living in Argentina as of 2006 and another 33,000 in the United States. Central Americans living abroad in 2005 were 3,314,300, of which 1,128,701 were Salvadorans, 685,713 were Guatemalans, 683,520 were Nicaraguans, 414,955 were Hondurans, 215,240 were Panamanians and 127,061 were Costa Rica.

As of 2006, Costa Rica and Chile were the only two countries with global positive migration rates. Spanish colonial era censuses meanwhile show that Mexicans and Peruvians composed 2.33% of the Philippines population during the 1600s.

== See also ==
Latin Americans by nationality

- Argentines
- Bolivians
- Brazilians
- Chileans
- Colombians
- Costa Ricans
- Cubans
- Dominicans
- Ecuadorians
- Guatemalans
- Haitians
- Hondurans
- Mexicans
- Nicaraguans
- Panamanians
- Paraguayans
- Peruvians
- Puerto Ricans
- Salvadorans
- Uruguayans
- Venezuelans

Other topics

- Californios
- Dekasegi
- Filipinos
- History of Latin America
- Italians
- Japanese Mexicans
- Latin American culture
- Latinos
- Los Angeles, California
- Miami
- Neomexicanos
- Nuyoricans
- Portuguese people
- Spaniards
- Tejanos
