= University Teachers Union (Japan) =

Trade union in Japan

UTU
- University Teachers Union
- Founded: January 1999
- Headquarters: Shimbashi, Minato Ward, Tokyo, Japan
- Location: Japan
- Members: 2,200 inclusive of the parent union
- Key people: Jason Nowe (President)
- Affiliations: NUGW Tokyo Nambu, NUGW National Council, National Trade Union Council (Zenrokyo)
- Website: official website

The University Teachers Union (大学教員組合 – Daigaku Kyouin Kumiai) was founded in January 1999 and represents the interests of tertiary-level teachers in the Kanto region of Japan. Membership is open to any teacher, regardless of nationality, who is employed at a university, college, or post-graduate institution in a non-management post. Under Japanese Trade Union Law, the University Teachers Union has the right to conduct collective bargaining with schools on behalf of its members. While negotiations with management are conducted in Japanese, internal business is mostly conducted in English.

== Affiliations ==
Although the University Teachers Union (UTU) describes itself as a union, it is in fact a branch of the National Union of General Workers Tokyo Nambu (全国一般労働組合東京南部 – Zenkoku Ippan Roudou Kumiai Tokyo Nambu), a trade union usually referred to as NUGW Tokyo Nambu or just Nambu. Nambu is a member of the NUGW National Council (全国一般労働組合全国協議会 Zenkoku Ippan Roudou Kumiai Zenkoku Kyogikai), a national umbrella organization for 39 trade unions, commonly known in English by its shortened title: the National Union of General Workers. NUGW National Council is in turn affiliated to National Trade Union Council (全国労働組合連絡協議会 – Zenrokyo), the smallest of the three national labour federations in Japan.

Within the NUGW National Council, UTU works closely with two of Nambu's sister unions which have a high proportion of foreign members: the General Union and the Fukuoka General Union. UTU also works closely with the Union of Part-Time Lecturers (非常勤講師組合 – Hijoukin Koushi Kumiai), a union established in 1996, with roughly 200 members. The Union of Part-Time Lecturers is affiliated to the second largest labour federation, the National Confederation of Trade Unions (全国労働組合総連合 – Zenroren), and conducts its business in Japanese.

== Aims ==
As a labour organization, UTU works towards the improvement and maintenance of working conditions, the improvement of the general working environment and employee welfare, and cooperation with other organizations that have similar objectives. UTU’s policies aim to realize:

- The creation of working environments in which professionalism and quality education are promoted
- A level of job security and stability which allows instructors to concentrate more on students' needs and research and less on issues of personal welfare
- The elimination of discrimination based on race, age, gender, sexual orientation or national origin
- The elimination of discrimination between different fields of education (such as that between lecture and so-called 'skills' classes).

== Surveys ==
In 2004, UTU carried out a Survey of Foreign Nationals at Japanese Universities. The survey was compiled and published in collaboration with the Tokyo area Union of Part-Time Lecturers.

The concerns used to formulate the survey were:

- The lack of equivalent contracts for Japanese and foreign workers.
- That foreigners’ contributions to education in Japan and their academic achievements were not being acknowledged.
- That difficulties facing foreigners in language, residence and visa administration were not being understood and properly taken into account by the universities.
- That foreigners and Japanese were not receiving the same benefits from the national pension system.

Questions concerned, among other issues: tenure and contracts, visa status, health insurance and pension, unemployment insurance, language, and housing. Analysis of responses from 330 foreign university instructors showed discriminatory treatment by universities in many of these matters. The Survey Report was submitted to the Ministry of Education, the Ministry of Labour and Welfare, and the Ministry of Justice at a meeting with lawmakers and officials on 8 March 2005.

UTU also contributed to a 2005 national survey of the conditions of part-time university lecturers, in conjunction with the Union of Part-Time Lecturers Kansai, Union of Part-Time Lecturers Tokyo Area, General Union, and Fukuoka General Union.

== Campaigns and actions ==
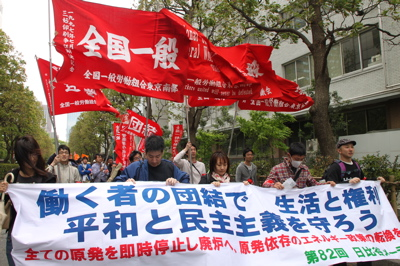
2011 National Trade Union Council (Zenrokyo) May Day march, Tokyo.

In 2007, as part of a campaign to maintain and improve working conditions, UTU launched a petition against outsourcing (the use of agency workers to reduce the labour costs of direct employment), a practice that continues to threaten the security of university teachers.

In 2006 and 2007, with the support of General Union and the Union of Part-Time Lecturers, UTU hosted forums and workshops in Tokyo to provide opportunities for college and university teachers to share experiences, and to explore ways to protect jobs, defend educational standards and improve working conditions on campus.

In 2008, UTU supported Amnesty International Japan and Solidarity Network with Migrants Japan in their campaign to abolish the discriminatory fingerprinting and photographing of foreign residents on their re-entry to Japan.

In the aftermath of the 11 March 2011 Tohoku earthquake, UTU has provided support to Nambu’s sister union, NUGW Tohoku.

National Trade Union Council (Zenrokyo) May Day, 2011. On May 1, 2011, UTU members along with Nambu under the banner of the National Union of General Workers, participated in the Hibiya Park rally commemorating International Workers' Day or May Day (see photo).

== See also ==
- Zenrokyo
- National Union of General Workers
- General Union (Japan)
- Japanese employment law
