= Immigration to Japan =

Migration destination

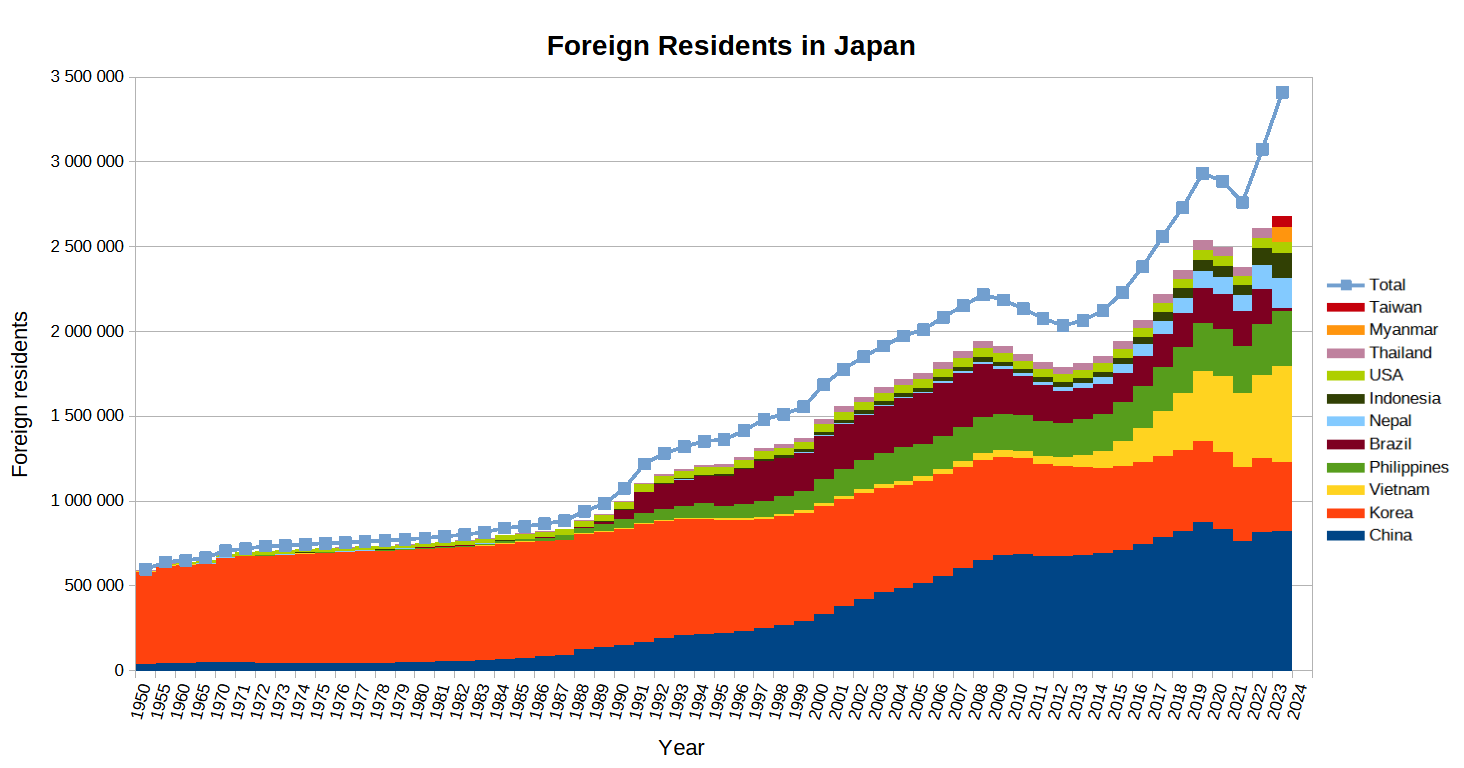
Foreign residents in Japan by source country, 1950-2024

According to the Ministry of Justice, the number of foreign residents in Japan has steadily increased since 1949.

In December 2025, there were more than 4.12 million foreign residents, accounting for approximately 3.35% of Japan's estimated population of 123.2 million.

== History ==
Foreign residents in Japan
Year	Pop.	±%
1950	598,696	—
1960	650,566	+8.7%
1970	708,458	+8.9%
1980	782,910	+10.5%
1985	850,612	+8.6%
1990	1,075,317	+26.4%
1995	1,362,371	+26.7%
2000	1,686,444	+23.8%
2005	2,011,555	+19.3%
2010	2,134,151	+6.1%
2015	2,232,189	+4.6%
2020	2,887,116	+29.3%
2025	4,125,395	+42.9%
Source: IPSS

Due to geographic remoteness and periods of self-imposed isolation, the immigration, cultural assimilation and integration of foreign nationals into mainstream Japanese society has been comparatively limited.

After 1945, unlike the guest worker immigration encouraged in other advanced industrial economies such as Germany, Japan was able to rely on internal pools of rural labor to satisfy the manpower needs of industry. In the late 1980s, the demands of small business owners and demographic shifts gave rise for a limited period to a wave of tacitly accepted illegal immigration from countries as diverse as the Philippines and Iran.

Production offshoring in the 1980s also enabled Japanese firms in some labor-intensive industries such as electronic goods manufacture and vehicle assembly to reduce their dependence on imported labor. In 1990, new government legislation provided South Americans of Japanese ancestry such as Japanese Brazilians and Japanese Peruvians with preferential working visa immigration status.

By 1998, there were 222,217 Brazilian nationals registered as residents in Japan, with a smaller number from Peru. In 2009, with economic conditions less favorable, this trend was reversed, with the Japanese government introducing a program to incentivize Brazilian and Peruvian immigrants to return home, with a stipend of $3,000 for an airfare and $2,000 for each dependent.

In late 2015, with an increasingly elderly Japanese population and lack of manpower in key sectors such as construction, IT services and health care, Japanese politicians were again debating the need to expand temporary foreign labor pools, through the use of short-term trainee programs. The years 2022–23 have seen rising immigration after policy changes in reaction to labour shortages, particularly in retail and hospitality industries.

== Economy ==
In a 2023 study by the independent think tank Recruit Works Institute, Japan may face a labor shortage of more than 11 million workers by 2040 due to its rapidly aging population and declining working-age population. The report projects that the worker supply will shrink by about 12% from 2022 levels by 2040, even as labor demand remains steady. To achieve the government’s target economic growth rate of 1.24% per year, Japan would need approximately 6.74 million foreign workers by 2040, nearly four times the number it had in 2020.

== Current immigration statistics ==
Resident foreign nationals in Japan that are counted in immigration statistics of permanent residents and mid-long-term residents (granted resident visas for 12 months or more), include individuals and their registered dependents with:

- Special permanent resident status
- Permanent Resident status
- Status of Residence based on Status or Position (Descendants of Japanese nationals)
- Individuals living in the country as registered spouses of Japanese nationals
- Individuals granted limited duration employment visas
- Individuals granted limited duration student or academic research visas
- Individuals on limited duration Technical Intern Training Program visas
- Registered refugee and asylum seekers

From 2013 published government reports, the proportion of foreign residents granted permanent resident status in Japan exceeded 30%. If foreign residents granted permanent resident status, spouses of Japanese nationals, fixed domicile residents (those of Japanese ancestry) and ethnic Koreans with residence in Japan are included, the number of resident foreigners granted permanent residence effectively exceeds 60%.

Japan receives a low number of immigrants compared to other G7 countries. This is consistent with Gallup data, which shows that Japan is an exceptionally unpopular migrant destination to potential migrants, with the number of potential migrants wishing to migrate to Japan 12 times less than those who wished to migrate to the US, and 3 times less than those who wished to migrate to Canada. This roughly corresponds to the actual relative differences in migrant inflows between the three countries.

Some Japanese scholars have pointed out that Japanese immigration laws, at least toward high-skilled migrants, are relatively lenient compared to other developed countries, and that the main factor behind its low migrant inflows is because it is a highly unattractive migrant destination compared to other developed countries. This is also apparent when looking at Japan's work visa programme for "specified skilled worker", which had less than 3,000 applicants, despite an annual goal of attracting 40,000 overseas workers.

=== By nationality ===
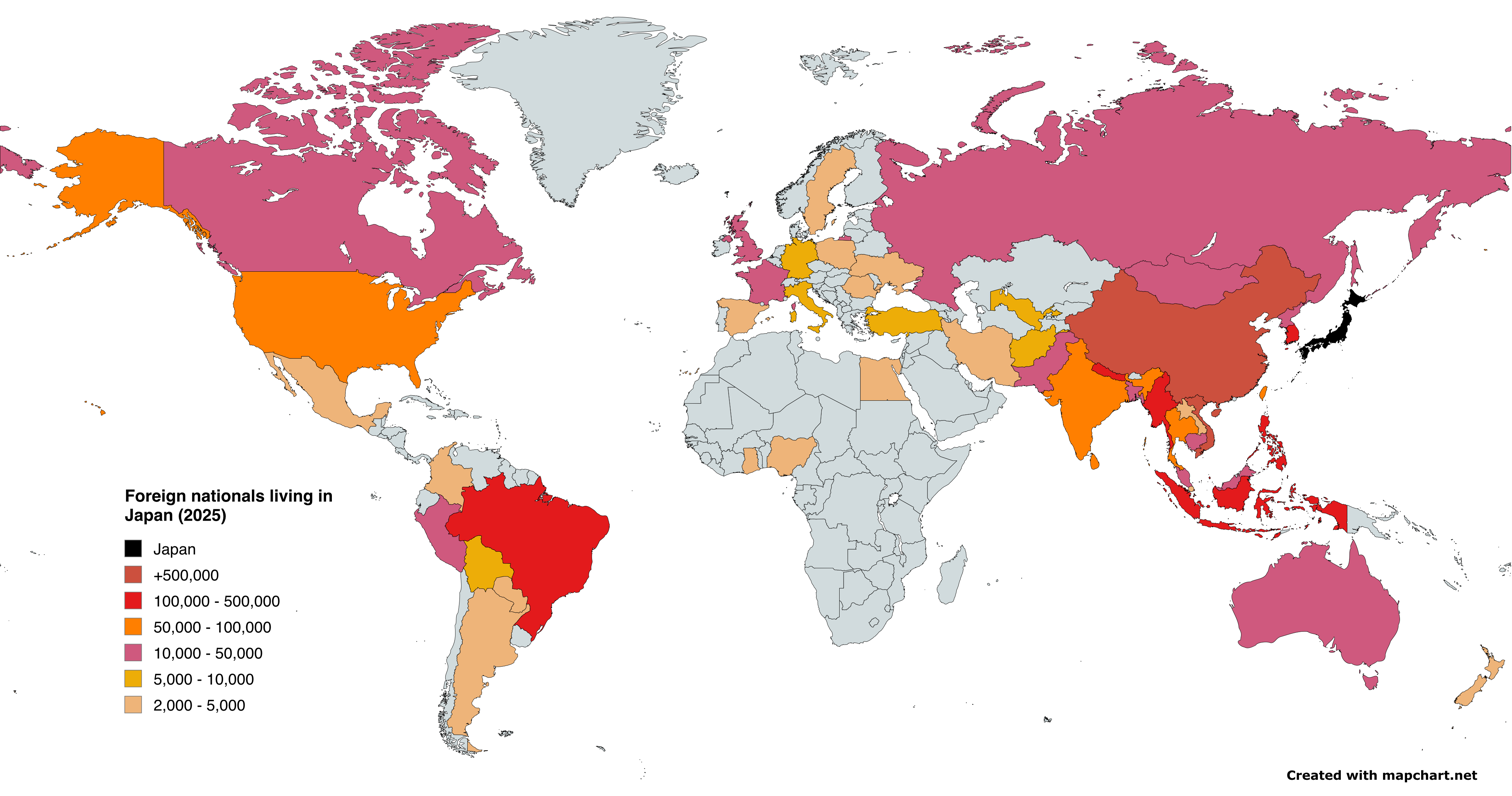
Foreign-born population by citizenship in 2025.

Foreign populations in Japan with over 10,000 residents, as of 31 December 2025:

Region	Country	Residents	See also
East Asia	China	930,428	Chinese people in Japan
Southeast Asia	Vietnam	681,100	Vietnamese people in Japan
East Asia	South Korea	407,341	Koreans in Japan
Southeast Asia	Philippines	356,579	Filipinos in Japan
South Asia	Nepal	300,992	Nepalis in Japan
Southeast Asia	Indonesia	266,069	Indonesians in Japan
South America	Brazil	210,014	Brazilians in Japan
Southeast Asia	Myanmar	182,567	Burmese people in Japan
South Asia	Sri Lanka	79,128	Sri Lankans in Japan
East Asia	Taiwan	73,256	Taiwanese in Japan
North America	United States	69,787	Americans in Japan
Southeast Asia	Thailand	67,097	Thais in Japan
South Asia	India	58,999	Indians in Japan
South America	Peru	49,020	Peruvians in Japan
South Asia	Bangladesh	44,938	Bangladeshis in Japan
South Asia	Pakistan	34,911	Pakistanis in Japan
Southeast Asia	Cambodia	28,957	Cambodians in Japan
Europe	United Kingdom	22,428	Britons in Japan
East Asia	Korea	22,201	Chōsen-seki
East Asia	Mongolia	21,359	Mongolians in Japan
Europe	France	17,088	French people in Japan
Oceania	Australia	13,776	Australians in Japan
North America	Canada	13,034	Canadians in Japan
Southeast Asia	Malaysia	12,266	Malaysians in Japan
Europe and Asia	Russia	12,187	Russians in Japan

== Immigration to Japan by resident status ==
=== Special Permanent Resident ===
The published statistics on foreign nationals resident in Japan includes zainichi Koreans, with tokubetsu eijusha Special permanent resident status at 277,664.

=== Permanent Resident ===
Foreign nationals already long-term residents in Japan under another visa category such as a working visa or as the spouse of a Japanese national are eligible to apply for permanent residence status. The granting of permanent residence status is at the discretion of the Immigration Bureau and dependent on satisfaction of a number of detailed criteria such as length of stay, ability to make an independent living, record of tax payments and documented contributions to Japan in terms of public service or professional activities. According to the Migrant Integration Policy Index, permanent residency laws were less stringent than those in the United States and the United Kingdom.

In September, the government announced stricter requirements for permanent residency, including higher fees, income requirements, Japanese-language proficiency, and pension-related requirements. The changes were part of broader immigration reforms under Prime Minister Sanae Takaichi.

=== Immigration through marriage ===
International marriage migration used to represent as much as 25% of permanent migration flows to Japan, but this trend has been in decline since a peak in 2006. In the 1980s increasing numbers of Japanese men were registering marriages in Japan to women from China, Korea and the Philippines.

In 2006, 44,701 marriages, or 6.11% of all marriages registered in Japan were to a foreign national. In 2013, this number had fallen to 21,488 marriages, or 3.25% of all marriages registered in Japan. Of the 21,488 international marriages registered in Japan in 2013, 15,442 or 71.77% were marriages involving a foreign bride, compared to 6,046 or 28.23% where the groom was non-Japanese.

Japan registered marriage statistics alone may not present a comprehensive picture of the numbers of international marriages in Japan, as marriages registered overseas may also contribute to total immigrant spouse numbers. Once married, foreign spouses may also, if certain criteria are satisfied, change their visa status to Permanent Resident or other visa categories. 2012 Ministry of Justice data indicates that of all foreigners in Japan, 7.5% are resident in Japan under a visa designation as a spouse of a Japanese national.

=== Long term residents on limited duration employment ===
In June 2024, there were 3,588,956 foreigners residing in Japan. Of this number, 1,181,203 were considered long-term, but non-permanent residents: those granted visas for a duration of 12 months or more. The majority of long-term residents in Japan on limited duration work or study visas were from Asia. Chinese made up the largest portion of this group with 844,187, followed by Vietnamese with 600,348, and Koreans with 411,043. Filipino, Nepalese, Indonesian and Taiwanese long-term residents totaled 47,956. Those from other Asian countries totaled 554,246.

In 2022, Technical Intern Training Program visas account for nearly 327,689 of the number. Vietnamese made up the largest group with 160,563, followed by Chinese with 37,4891, and Indonesians with 34,459.

=== Student visas ===
According to the Japan Student Services Organization (JSSO), as of 2023, 279,274 international students are residing in Japan. Chinese made up the largest portion of this group with 115,493, followed by Nepalis with 37,878, and Vietnamese with 36,339.

== Refugees and asylum seekers ==
Japan is a signatory to the UN 1951 Refugee Convention and the 1967 Protocol. Japan therefore has made a commitment to offer protection to people who seek asylum and fall into the legal definition of a refugee, and not to return any displaced person to places where they would otherwise face persecution.

Japan has historically been one of the world's most generous donors to refugee relief and resettlement programs overseas. In 2014, Japan was the world's 2nd largest financial contributor to UNHCR programs. Japanese diplomat Sadako Ogata served as the United Nations High Commissioner for Refugees from 1991 to 2000.

In December 2015, Japan had 13,831 asylum applications under review. In 2016, more than 10,000 applications for refugee status in Japan were received and in the same year 28 asylum applications were approved. In 2015, more than 7,500 people applied for refugee status and 27 asylum applications were approved. In 2014, more than 5,000 applications were made and 11 applications were approved.

Recent low approval rates for asylum applications follow historic trends. From 1982 to 2004, 330 applications for asylum were approved, an average of 15 per year.

Total numbers of asylum applications in Japan 2010–2025
Year	No. received	No. approved
2010	1,202	39
2011	1,867	21
2012	2,545	18
2013	3,260	6
2014	5,000	11
2015	7,586	27
2016	10,901	28
2017	19,629	20
2018	10,493	42
2019	10,375	44
2020	3,936	47
2021	2,413	74
2022	3,772	202
2023	13,823	303
2024	12,373	190
2025	11,298	187

Whereas in Germany and Canada around 40% of asylum applications are approved, in Japan the number averages 0.2 percent. On occasion, where Japan has stopped short of granting official refugee status, a limited number of applicants have been granted permission to stay on humanitarian grounds. In 2016, 97 refugee applicants were granted permission to stay on this basis. Decisions on refugee status in Japan are often slow, and confirmations of deportation orders are not widely published. Resubmission of asylum claims by previously unsuccessful applicants often occurs.

=== Closure of asylum application legal loophole ===
Between 2010 and January 2018, a rise in the number of asylum seekers in Japan was attributed in part to a legal loophole related to the government administered Technical Intern Training Program. In 2015, 192,655 vocational trainees mainly from developing economies were working in Japan in factories, construction sites, farms, food processing and in retail. Although total numbers are small, following a change in rules in 2010, asylum applications jumped four-fold, fueled by asylum seekers from Nepal, Turkey and Sri Lanka.

Rising numbers of vocational trainees reportedly made formal asylum applications in order to change employers and escape reported employment abuses and low pay. The government-backed vocational program allows trainees to work on either one or three year contracts. Although the chances of refugee status been granted in Japan are exceptionally small, asylum applicants were permitted to get a job six months after applying for refugee status and, significantly, to make their own choice of employer.

Permits enabling legal employment six months after application for refugee status were discontinued by the Justice Ministry in January 2018. Workplace inspections and illegal immigration deportation enforcement activities were subsequently stepped up aimed at curbing alleged abuse of the refugee application system.

In June 2024, Japan revised an immigration law allowing deportations of immigrants who applied for refugee status three or more times if they did not submit reasonable grounds for approval, and would be allowed to live outside detention facilities conditionally.

== Illegal immigration ==
According to Ministry of Justice (MOJ) estimates, the number of foreign nationals staying illegally in Japan beyond their authorized period of stay dropped to approximately 71,000 as of 1 July 2025. Illegal immigrant numbers had peaked at approximately 300,000 in May 1993, but have been gradually reduced through a combination of stricter enforcement of border controls, workplace monitoring and an expansion of government-run foreign worker programs for those seeking a legal route to short term employment opportunities in Japan.

Border controls at ports of entry for foreign nationals include examination of personal identification documentation, finger printing and photo recording. Security at both air and maritime ports is closely controlled. As a result, according to MOJ data, the single largest source of illegal immigrants in Japan are those foreign nationals found to have stayed illegally beyond the 90 day time period of the temporary visitor visa.

== Immigrant integration into Japanese society ==
=== Naturalisation ===
In 2015, 9,469 applications for Japanese citizenship were approved. The number of foreign residents in Japan applying to naturalize and obtain Japanese citizenship peaked in 2008 at more than 16,000, but declined to 12,442 in 2015. Processing of applications can take up to 18 months. Application criteria are set deliberately high and inspectors are granted a degree of discretion in interpretation of eligibility and good conduct criteria. Apart from the requirement to renounce foreign citizenship, naturalization criteria are similar to other developed countries such as the US, although there is no citizenship test. About 80 percent of naturalization applications in Japan are approved, compared to about 90 percent in the US.

Most of the decline in applications is accounted for by a steep reduction in the number of Japan-born Koreans taking Japanese citizenship. Historically the bulk of those taking Japanese citizenship have not been new immigrants but rather Special Permanent Residents; Japan-born descendants of Koreans and Taiwanese who remained in Japan at the end of the Second World War. Since 1989, 251,753 Koreans (Zainichi, Chōsen-seki and citizens of South Korea) have naturalized in Japan and 127,223 Chinese citizens have naturalized in Japan.

=== Ethnicity and nationality ===
The concept of minzoku (民族; "ethnic group") as represented in Japanese makes no distinction between racial, ethnic, and national identities. Where the census of the United Kingdom, for example, separates ethnic or racial background from nationality, the Japanese Census and Statistics Bureau do not distinguish between the two.

The definition of ethnic and racial boundaries alongside national ones leads many people to represent Japan as tan’itsu minzoku kokka (単一民族国家; "an ethnically homogeneous nation"), with an explicit purity of blood and culture. In 2005, future Prime Minister Tarō Asō described Japan as being a nation of "one race, one civilization, one language and one culture". In 2012, this claim was repeated by former Governor of Tokyo Shintaro Ishihara.

The concept of a unified minzoku retains a legal authority. A 1984 amendment to the Japanese Nationality Act made citizenship jus sanguinis, tied to blood rather than place of birth. Japanese citizenship is exclusive: those who naturalize must renounce their first nationality, and those who are born Japanese but with a second citizenship must choose between them by the time they are 20 years old.

=== Public opinion towards immigration ===
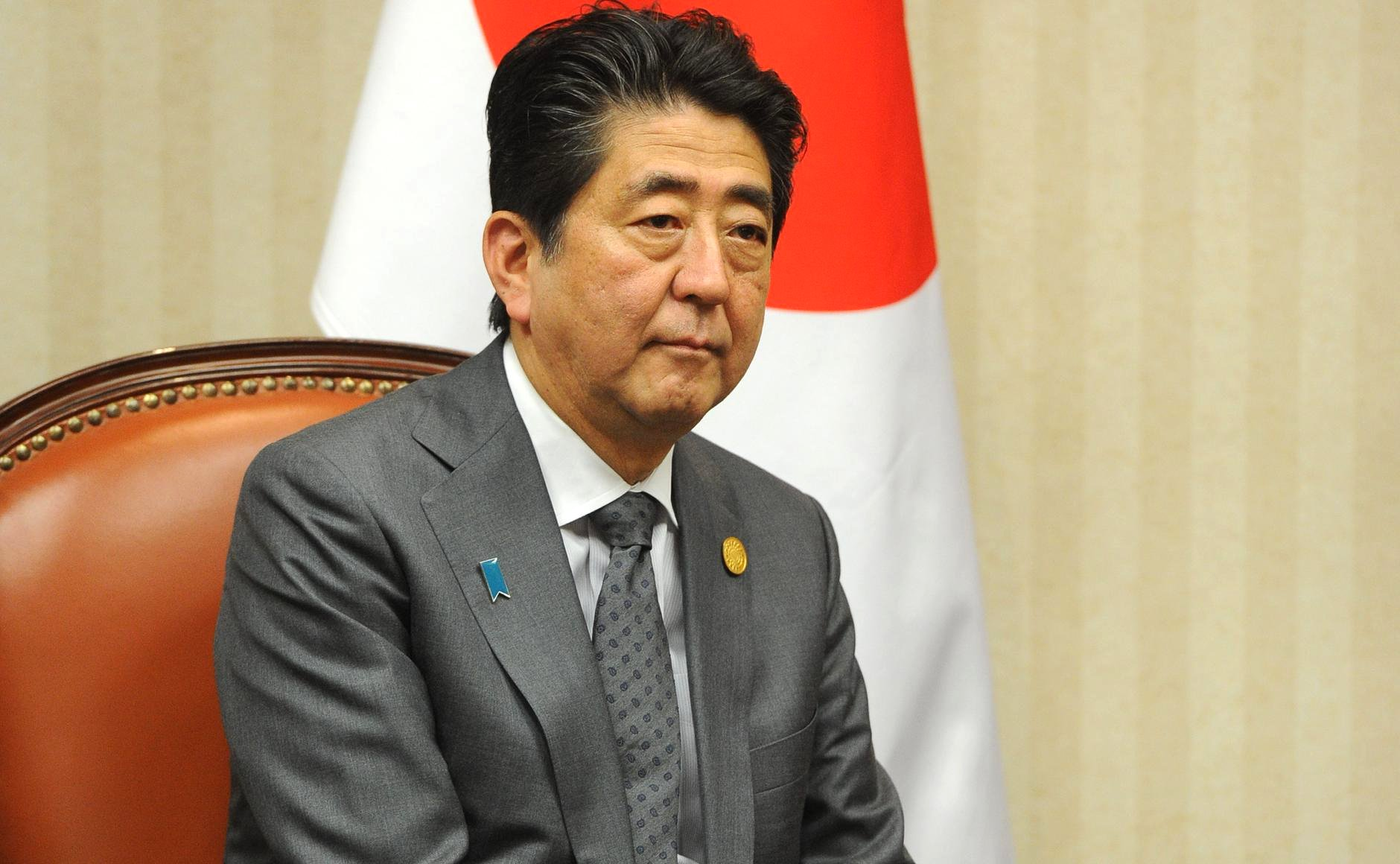
Shinzo Abe, Japan's longest-serving Prime Minister, was known for his policies that generally favored stricter immigration controls

Overall, polls find that Japanese public opinion toward immigration is similar to other G7 countries. A 1999 review article of opinion polls show attitudes broadly neutral and less negative than other developed countries.

In 1993, 64% of respondents supported allowing firms facing labor shortages to hire unskilled foreign workers. A 2017 poll by Gallup shows a similar attitude 24 years later, with Japan middling among developed countries in terms of public positivity towards immigration, ranking close to France, Belgium and Italy. In a Nikkei survey from 2019, 69% of respondents said an increase in foreigners was "good". Japanese who are college educated are almost 50% more likely to favor immigration for both economic and cultural reasons.

A 2019 Pew Research Center poll found Japanese respondents had more positive views of immigrants than respondents in most countries. Another Pew Research Center poll found Japanese respondents were the least likely to support a reduction in immigration, and among the most likely to support an increase in immigration, of the 27 countries surveyed.

A 2016 poll by the Asahi Shimbun found that 34% of its readers opposed an expansion of immigration to maintain Japan's economic status in the face of a shrinking and rapidly aging workforce, while 51% of its readers supported increased immigration.

However, a large poll of 10,000 native Japanese conducted later that year, between October and December 2015, found more opposition to increasing foreign immigration. Over half of Asahi Shimbun's readers who responded to a 2016 poll said that immigrants should respect Japanese culture and obey Japanese customs, while about one quarter said that Japanese people should embrace diversity. On the other hand, one of the common arguments for restricting immigration is based on safeguarding security, including public order, protecting welfare mechanisms, cultural stability, or social trust.

Another poll conducted by the Asahi Shimbun in 2018 showed an increase in opposition to immigration: 43% of the readers who responded were against the increase of immigrant workers, and 45% of those readers were in favor.

==== Opposition ====
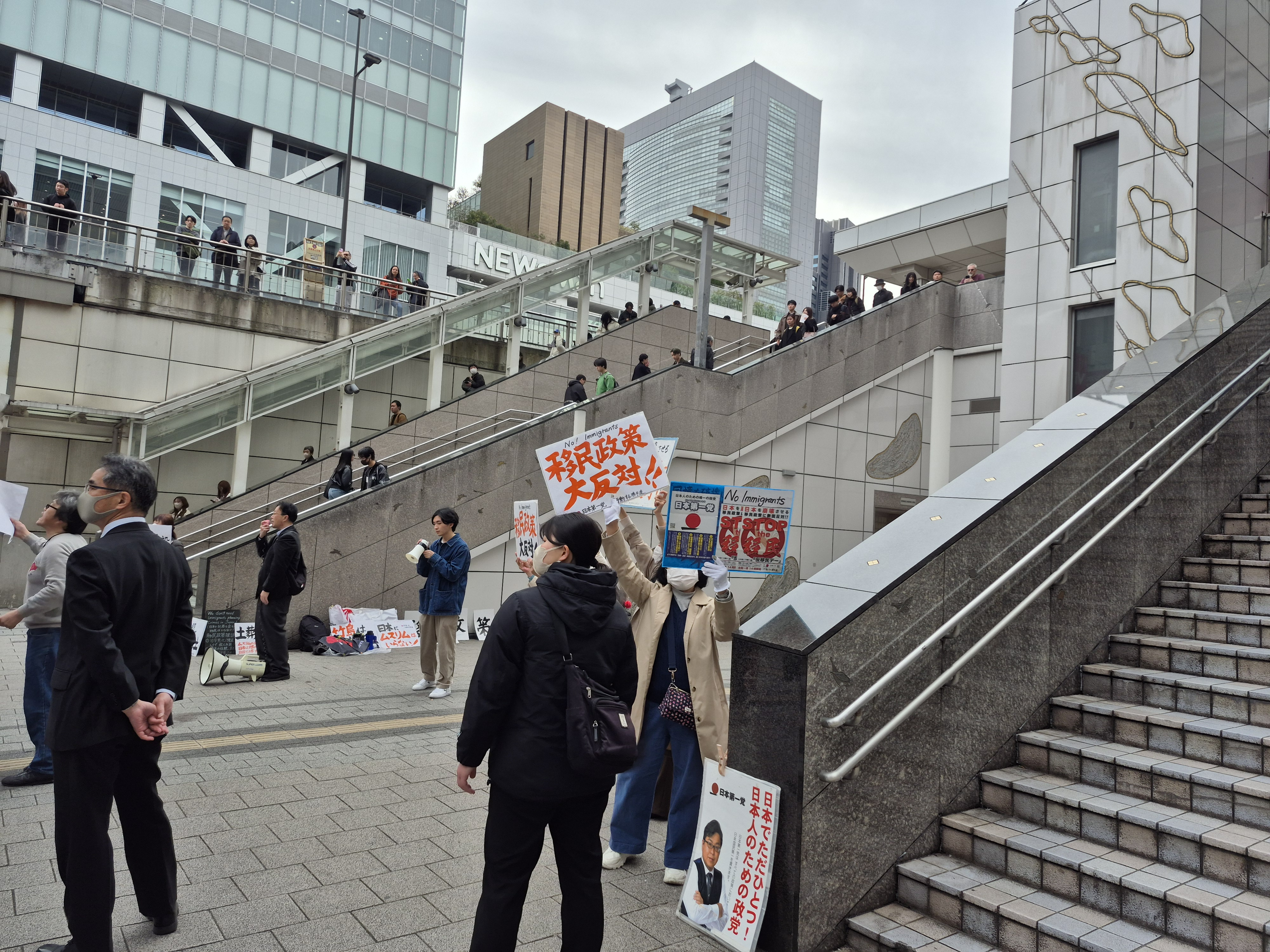
A small anti-immigration protest in Tokyo in February 2026.

In 2015, the Abe government declined to accept refugees fleeing conflicts in the Middle East and Africa. Japanese Prime Minister Shinzo Abe stated that Japan must "solve its own problems before accepting immigrants." He supported a temporary work visa program that would allow migrant workers to "work for a limited period, earn more and return home."

Like her fellow candidates in the 2025 LDP leadership election, Japanese Prime Mininster Sanae Takaichi has been described as taking a "hard-line stance" on immigration. The New York Times stated that during her leadership campaign "she seized on a wave of anti-immigrant sentiment". Specifically she has been described as wanting "tighter restrictions on immigration" and employed "anti-immigration rhetoric" during her campaign.

== Immigration detention ==
Japanese immigration law permits indefinite detention without a court order including for those that overstay and those who seek asylum. Three immigration detention centers are maintained by immigration bureau for long-term detainees:

- Higashi Nihon Nyukoku Kanri Center (Ushiku, Ibaraki, East Japan) – capacity: 700
- Nishi Nihon Nyukoku Kanri Center (Ibaraki, Osaka, West Japan)
- Omura Nyukoku Kanri Center (Omura, Nagasaki) – capacity: 800

In 2013, 16 regional detention houses were managed for short-term detention. Many of the long-term detainees have been detained in regional short-term detention houses that lack facilities such as common rooms and recreational area. Some detainees spend significant time, up to 13 days, in isolation due to disciplinary measures. Practices of immigration bureau has been criticized for the "lack of transparency", "indefinite detention" and its "arbitrary" nature.

== See also ==
- Japanese diaspora—Information on historical and current migration trends from Japan.
