= Japan International Training Cooperation Organization =

Japanese public interest foundation (e. 1991)

Japan International Training Cooperation Organization (国際研修協力機構 Kokusai Kenshū Kyōryoku Kikō), abbreviated as JITCO (ジツコ Jitsuko), is a Japanese public interest incorporated foundation established in 1991. JITCO operates under the jurisdiction of the Ministry of Justice (MOJ), the Ministry of Health, Labour and Welfare (MHLW), the Ministry of Economy, Trade and Industry (METI), the Ministry of Foreign Affairs (MOFA) and the Ministry of Land, Infrastructure, Transport and Tourism (MLIT). The foundation's purpose is to promote and facilitate the Technical Intern Training Program. It is mainly funded through membership fees from associations and enterprises that dispatch or employ foreign migrant workers as technical intern trainees in Japan.
