= Panethnicity =

Political neologism

Panethnicity is a political neologism used to group various ethnic groups together based on their related cultural origins; geographic, linguistic, religious, or "racial" (i.e. phenotypic) similarities are often used alone or in combination to draw panethnic boundaries. The term panethnic was used extensively during the mid-20th century anti-colonial/national liberation movements. In the United States, Yen Le Espiritu popularized the term and coined the nominal term panethnicity in reference to Asian Americans, a racial category composed of disparate peoples having in common only their origin in the continent of Asia.

It has since seen some use as a replacement of the term race; for example, the aforementioned Asian Americans can be described as "a panethnicity" of various unrelated peoples of Asia, which are nevertheless perceived as a distinguishable group within the larger multiracial North American society.

More recently the term has also come to be used in contexts outside multiculturalism in US society, as a general replacement for terms like ethnolinguistic group or racial group.

The concept is to be distinguished from "pan-nationalism", which similarly groups related ethnicities but in the context of either ethnic nationalism (e.g. pan-Arabism, pan-Celticism, pan-Germanism, pan-Indianism, pan-Iranism, pan-Latinism, pan-Slavism, pan-Turkism) or civic nationalism (e.g. pan-Africanism).

== United States ==
Panethnicity has allowed Asian Americans to unite based on similar historical relations with the United States (such as - in some cases - US military presence in their native countries). The Asian American panethnic identity has evolved to become a means for immigrant groups such as Asian Americans to unite in order to gain political strength in numbers. Similarly, one can speak of a "panethnic European American category".

Scholarship on the historical development and institutionalization of Hispanic/Latino panethnicity, such as that by sociologist G. Cristina Mora in her book "Making Hispanics: How Activists, Bureaucrats, and Media Constructed a New American" (2014), has examined how governmental, media, and activist institutions jointly shaped the emergence of broad panethnic identities in the United States.

The term "American" has become one of the more widespread panethnic concepts.

Mainstream institutions and political policies often play a big role in the labeling of panethnic groups. They often enact policies that deal with specific groups of people, and panethnic groups are one way to group large numbers of people. Public policy might dole out resources or make deals with multiple groups, viewing them all as one large entity.

Panethnic labels are often, though not always, created and employed by outsiders of the group that is being defined panethnically. In the case of the Asian American movement of the 1960s and 1970s, the panethnic label "Asian American" was not created by outsiders; rather, it was coined by professor Yuji Ichioka and his spouse, Emma Gee, in order to consolidate Asian activists that they had seen at various political demonstrations of the time. The manner in which the two garnered support for the alliance sheds light on the expressly panethnic approach that was at the core of this new Asian American identity: they went through the roster of the Peace and Freedom Party, a majority white anti-war organization that was protesting the Vietnam War at the time, and telephoned all the individuals they could find with "Asian" surnames. Though the Asian American identity was initially not inclusive of many Asian ethnicities, new waves of Asian immigrants since the 1965 Immigration and Nationality Act have accelerated the expansion of the identity. At the time of the 2000 US census, 88% of Asian America was made up of six Asian ethnicities: Chinese, Japanese, Korean, Filipino, Indian, and Vietnamese.

=== Criticism ===
The use of "Asian American" as a panethnic racial label is often criticized, due to the term only encompassing some of the diverse peoples of Asia, and for grouping together the racially and culturally different South Asians with East Asians as the same "race". Americans of West Asian descent, such as Iranian, Israeli, Armenian, and many Arab nationalities, are notably excluded from the term despite West Asia being geographically part of Asia. As well as West Asians having racial and cultural similarities with South Asians. The common justification for grouping together South Asians and East Asians is because of Buddhism's origins in India, but the religion has "practically died out" in South Asia.

Although the panethnic term refers to Americans of East Asian, South Asian, and Southeast Asian ancestry, "Asian American" is usually synonymous for people of East Asian ancestry and or appearance, which has caused some to highlight the general exclusion of South Asians and Southeast Asians.

== See also ==
- Asian Pacific American Labor Alliance
- British people
- Ethnic group
- Ethnographic group
- Ethnolinguistic group
- Ethnoreligious group
- La Raza
- Meta-ethnicity
- Metroethnicity
- Monoethnicity
- Polyethnicity
- Symbolic ethnicity
- Yugoslavs

== Sources ==
- Okamoto, Dina G. (2003). "Towards a Theory of Panethnicity: Explaining Asian American Collective Action". American Sociological Review. 68 (6): 811–842. doi:10.2307/1519747. JSTOR 1519747.
- Schaefer, Richard (2008). Encyclopedia of Race, Ethnicity, and Society. doi:10.4135/9781412963879. ISBN 978-1-4129-2694-2.
- Okamoto, Dina G.; Mora, Cristina (2014). "Panethnicity". Annual Review of Sociology. 40: 219–239. doi:10.1146/annurev-soc-071913-043201.
