= Solidarity Network with Migrants Japan =

Japanese human rights organization

Solidarity Network with Migrants Japan (移住者と連帯する全国ネットワーク, Ijūsha to Rentai suru Zenkoku Nettowāku), abbreviated as SMJ (移住連, Ijūren), is a non-partisan advocacy and human rights organization and umbrella of migrant interest and support organizations founded 1997 in Japan. Solidarity Network with Migrants Japan was founded in 1997 by 66 migrant support groups and 72 individuals, who started to meet on a regular basis at the "nationwide forum for solidarity with migrant workers" (ijū rōdōsha to rentai suru zenkoku fōramu) in 1996. Since June 2015 SMJ is legally incorporated as Non-Profit Organization (NPO) under the Japanese NPO-law. Among the SMJ's members are organizations as well as individuals. The SMJ's office is located in Bunkyō ward, Tokyo. The largest part of its revenue comes from membership fees and subscriptions.

== Activities ==
SMJ describes its activities as advocacy, networking, and publicity. Authors observed the organizations' potential for deliberative democracy and global citizenship education.

=== Publications ===
SMJ publishes the monthly Japanese language magazine Migrants Network (abbreviated as M-net). One issue costs 500 yen and can be purchased via subscription. The SMJ has also edited several non-fiction books on different migration issues. Most of them have been published by Akashi Shoten, a publisher in Tokyo specializing in education, social and minority issues in Japan.

=== Policy demands ===
In 2002 the SMJ demanded wide-ranging reforms of foreigner policies in Japan. As the SMJ's proposal touched all aspects of migration and foreigners living in Japan, it has been one of the most encompassing in Japan so far. In ten chapters it recommended policy revisions that concerned the rights of foreigners as workers, women's rights, education and citizenship of children, the role of the local self-government, the treatment of asylum seekers, the rights of foreigners in court and proclaimed the aim of ending racism and xenophobia in Japan. A central demand of SMJ is abolishing the Technical Intern Training Program and creating a visa category for foreign nationals finding employment in Japan without restriction on skills and educational attainment.

Further legal changes proposed by SMJ include the introduction of a basic law on the human rights of foreigners, a law that prohibits discrimination based on race and ethnicity, a constitutional reform that guarantees more basic rights to foreigners, a separation of the law on immigration and refugee recognition and abolishing of the Alien Registration Act. It also urged the Japanese government to completely ratify all international human rights conventions, as well as to withdraw its reservations concerning the International Convention on the Elimination of All Forms of Racial Discrimination (ICERD).

=== Advocacy ===
The SMJ has no formal ties to political parties in Japan. In July 2008, the former Democratic Party of Japan (DPJ), which was in power from August 2009 to December 2012, published a report on foreign workers policies. Besides other institutions and interest groups, the DPJ's committee also invited SMJ representatives as external advisors during the drafting process.

Since its establishment in 1997, SMJ and its partner organizations regularly met with bureaucrats from several ministries at least twice a year in March and November, and SMJ members have appeared as external councilors in parliamentary commissions of the National Diet in 2003, 2004 and twice in 2009.

== In the media ==
SMJ regularly serves as information sources for journalists reporting on migration issues in Japan. Ippei Torii, the secretary general of SMJ, appeared in the 2009 documentary movie "Sour Strawberries – Japan's Hidden Guest Workers". On 17 September 2019 the Japanese public broadcaster NHK aired a 40 minutes feature on Torii.

== International recognition ==
When in 2010 the UN Special Rapporteur on the human rights of migrants, Jorge Bustamante, visited Japan he also met with SMJ. As a result, Bustamante's report widely adopted SMJ's view on the Technical Intern Training Program stating that "situations amount to slavery or trafficking", and that since there was:

no effective system [...] in place to monitor the situation of trainees and technical interns and offer them protection and referral mechanisms, they remained particularly vulnerable and became victims of serious abuses.

In July 2013, Secretary of State John Kerry awarded Ippei Torii with the title of "TIP Report Hero", for being:

a forceful leader in anti-trafficking efforts as the secretary general for Solidarity Network with Migrants Japan (SMJ), which has provided shelter and assistance to more than 4,000 foreign workers in Japan who have escaped from exploitative conditions or sought help recovering unpaid wages. [...] Mr. Torii meets regularly with various ministries that are responsible for oversight of the program, and he has provided guidance to the UN Special Rapporteur on the Human Rights of Migrants. His persistence has kept this issue squarely before the press and on the political agenda in Japan.
