= Special permanent resident (Japan) =

Status for former colonial subjects of Japan

A Special Permanent Resident (特別永住者, tokubetsu eijūsha) is a resident of Japan with ancestral origins in Japan's former colonies, Korea and Taiwan, during the period of colonial rule. This status was created in 1991. Individuals in this category had previously been subjects of the Empire of Japan, but had involuntarily lost that status after the war when the Treaty of San Francisco took effect in 1952 (i.e. former citizens of Japan and their descendants).

== Demographics ==
As of 2025, around 266,896 people in Japan were classified as Special Permanent Residents.

== History and political status ==
Korean residents of Japan, known as Zainichi Koreans, were permitted to naturalise and become Japanese citizens, but many hesitated to do so given anti-Korean prejudice in Japan. In accordance with the law that took effect in Japan in November 1991, Zainichi Koreans gained Special Permanent Resident status.

Although Special Permanent Residents are unable to vote in Japanese elections, they are usually afforded additional rights and privileges beyond those of normal Permanent Residents comparable to a citizen. For example, Special Permanent Residents are not subject to immigration control under Article 5 of the Immigration Control Act of 1951. During the coronavirus pandemic of 2020, Special Permanent Residents were allowed the right of return, while other permanent residents were denied permission to enter Japan.
