= John C. Maher =

Irish-British author and academic

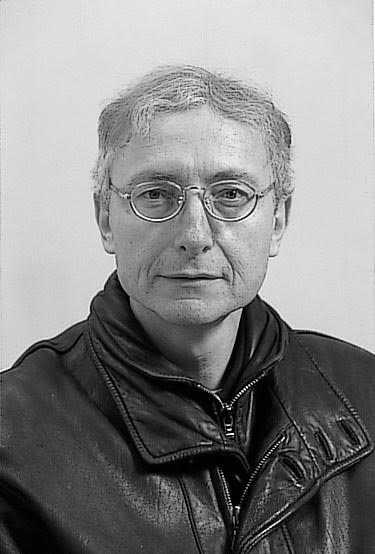
- Born: 22 January 1951; Leeds, England

Academic background
- Education: University of London, B.A. (1974); University of London, Heythrop College, M.TH.(1976); University of Michigan, M.A.(1982); University of Edinburgh, Ph.D.(1986)

Academic work
- Discipline: Sociolinguistics
- Institutions: International Christian University

John C. Maher (born 22 January 1951) is an Irish-British linguist, academic and author, professor of linguistics at International Christian University, Tokyo, Japan.

== Biography ==
Maher was born in Leeds, England and attended schools in Leeds, Mirfield and Dumfries. He has a Bachelor of Arts (1974) and Master of Theology (1976) from the University of London, a Master of Arts from the University of Michigan (1982) and a PhD in linguistic from the University of Edinburgh (1986).

== Career ==
Maher specializes in sociolinguistics with particular reference to multilingualism. He has pioneered frameworks for the description of multilingualism in Japan. He also developed the concept of metroethnicity as a hybrid, portable, lifestyle ethnicity used for aesthetic effect. He was lecturer in Japanese in the Department of East Asian Studies at the University of Edinburgh, Scotland, and taught English at the University of Hiroshima, Shimane Medical University and the English Language Institute, University of Michigan. His paper on English as an International Language of Medicine won the English-Speaking Union Prize for Best Academic Paper of the Year (1986). He was a British Council Lecturer at De La Salle University, Manila.

He is a founding member of Nihon Gengo Shakai Kagakkai 日本言語社会科学会 (Japan Association of Sociolinguistics).

== Publications ==
- マーハ・ジョン、八代京子編著（1991）『日本のバイリンガリズム』東京、研究社。1991. Bilingualism in Japan]. with Kyoko Yashiro (Tokyo: Kenkyusha ).
- マーハ・ジョン、本名信行編著（1994）『新しい日本観世界観に向かって：言語と文化の多様性』東京、国際書院。 [Towards a New Order: Linguistic and Cultural Diversity in Japan] with N. Honna. Tokyo; Kokusai Shoin.
- Diversity in Japanese Culture and Language Maher, J. and Macdonald, G. (Eds). (Kegan International, 1995)
- Multilingual Japan. Maher, J. and Yashiro, K. (Eds). (Multilingual Matters 1995)
- Introducing Chomsky. Illustrated by Judy Groves. (Cambridge: Icon Books 1997)
- Literacy for Dialogue in Multilingual Societies (Co-ed with B. Jelisava, C. Duval) (Linguapax Asia/Sun Process, Tokyo, 2012.)
- マーハ・ジョン、ジュディ・グローヴス（2004）『チョムスキー入門』東京：明石書店
- Languages in Danger and Language Networks. T. Katsuragi and J. Maher (Eds). (Tokyo: Sangensha. 2017)
- Multilingualism: a Very Short Introduction. (Oxford: Oxford University Press 2017)
- Metroethnicity, Naming and Mocknolect: New Horizons in Sociolinguistics. John Benjamins Publishing Company. 15 May 2021. ISBN 9789027260024.
- John C. Maher, ed. (25 April 2022). Language Communities in Japan. Oxford University Press. ISBN 9780198856610.
