= G. Cristina Mora =

American sociologist

- Occupation: Sociologist
- Known for: Research on panethnicity and Latino identity formation

Academic work
- Discipline: Sociology
- Sub-discipline: Race and ethnicity Panethnicity; Immigration; Latino studies
- Institutions: University of California, Berkeley
- Notable works: Making Hispanics: How Activists, Bureaucrats, and Media Constructed a New American

G. Cristina Mora is an American sociologist and Chancellor's Professor at the University of California, Berkeley. Her research examines the social construction and institutionalization of racial and ethnic categorization, panethnicity, and immigration politics in the United States. She also serves as co-director of the Institute of Governmental Studies at UC Berkeley.

== Early life and education ==
Mora grew up in Pacoima, a neighborhood in the San Fernando Valley of Los Angeles County, California. She is a child of immigrants and the daughter of Mexican American heritage. Initially, she aspired to become a teacher or school principal. Mora earned her B.A. in Sociology from UC Berkeley in 2003, graduating from the institution where she later would establish her academic career. She went on to earn her Ph.D. in Sociology from Princeton University in 2009 with dissertation titled "De Muchos, Uno: The Institutionalization of Latino Panethnicity, 1960–1990". In the dissertation she examined the historical construction of the Hispanic/Latino panethnic category in the United States. Before returning to UC Berkeley as faculty, Mora was a Provost Postdoctoral Scholar in Sociology at the University of Chicago from 2009 to 2011.

== Academic career ==
Mora joined the UC Berkeley faculty in July 2011 as an assistant professor in the Department of Sociology. She has since been promoted to Chancellor's Professor, the highest faculty rank at UC Berkeley. She holds a courtesy appointment in Chicano/Latino Studies. In July 2020, Mora was named co-director of the Institute of Governmental Studies at UC Berkeley alongside Eric Schickler, an interdisciplinary research center that conducts policy-relevant research and oversees the California Field Poll. She also serves as director of Berkeley Connect in the Department of Sociology, a program providing mentorship and support for graduate students.

== Research and scholarship ==
Mora's research focuses on racial and ethnic categorization, panethnicity, organizations, immigration, and racial politics in the United States and beyond. Her work examines how racial and ethnic categories are socially constructed, institutionalized, and contested through the interactions of government agencies, activist organizations, media institutions, and individuals.

=== Major publications ===
Mora's first and most widely cited monograph is Making Hispanics: How Activists, Bureaucrats, and Media Constructed a New American (2014, University of Chicago Press), which provides the first comprehensive historical account of how the Hispanic/Latino panethnic identity emerged in the United States between the 1960s and 1990s. The book is based on extensive archival research, oral histories, and interviews tracing how activists, bureaucrats, and media executives in the 1970s and 1980s worked to construct a unified identity across previously distinct Mexican American, Puerto Rican, and Cuban American populations. The work argues that this identity formation was not inevitable but rather resulted from "cross-field effects"—the concept that developments in one institutional sector (government, media, or activism) sparked and accelerated changes in other sectors.

The book received endorsements from prominent scholars including Edward Telles (Princeton University), Paul DiMaggio (Princeton University), and Hayagreeva Rao (Stanford Graduate School of Business). One reviewer noted it as "a model and masterpiece of institutional analysis." As of 2024, the book has been cited over 687 times in academic scholarship.

Mora has also authored significant peer-reviewed articles, including:

- "Cross-Field Effects and Ethnic Classification: The Institutionalization of Hispanic Panethnicity, 1965 to 1990" (2014), published in American Sociological Review, which has been cited over 171 times
- "Panethnicity" (2014), co-authored with Dina Okamoto, published in the Annual Review of Sociology, providing a comprehensive review of panethnicity as a form of ethnic identification globally
- "Pandemic Politics: Political Worldviews and COVID-19 Beliefs and Practices in an Unsettled Time" (2020), co-authored with Hana Shepherd and Norah MacKendrick, published in Socius, examining how political ideology shaped COVID-19 health beliefs and behaviors in California
- "Who identifies as 'Latinx'? The generational politics of ethnoracial labels" (2022), co-authored with R. Perez and N. Vargas, published in Social Forces, exploring generational differences in adoption of the term Latinx

In 2025 and 2026 Mora was working on additional book projects: Normalizing Inequality: How Californians Make Sense of the Growing Divide and California Color Lines.

== Teaching and curriculum development ==
Mora is noted for her commitment to undergraduate and graduate teaching. She developed Latino Sociology, a course examining the historical and contemporary experiences of Latinx populations in the United States, designed for students who had limited exposure to scholarly material centered on the Latinx experience. In 2023, she co-authored research documenting that only 4% of colleges and universities in the U.S. offer a major centered on the Latinx experience, examining majors such as Latino Studies, Mexican American Studies, Chicano Studies, and Puerto Rican Studies.

== Research initiatives and public engagement ==
In April 2020, Mora helped oversee a large survey on COVID-19 and racial disparities in California, a project that produced some of the state's first research briefs and articles examining the pandemic's differential impact on communities of color. Her research on COVID-19 politics has been featured in numerous national media outlets including The Atlantic, The New Yorker, and NPR. In 2020, Mora played a key role in establishing UC Berkeley's first social-science cluster hire focused on "Latinos and Democracy," a multi-year initiative to recruit and support faculty conducting research on Latino political participation and representation. In 2023, Mora and her colleagues Michael Rodríguez-Muñiz and Nicholas Vargas secured federal funding from the U.S. Department of Education to establish the Latino Social Science Pipeline Initiative (LSSPI) at UC Berkeley, the nation's first such initiative. The $1 million grant, obtained with support from U.S. Senator Alex Padilla and Congresswoman Barbara Lee, aims to advance Latino social science research, training, and community engagement. The initiative provides fellowships, research grants, and community partnerships to develop the next generation of Latino-focused social scientists and policy researchers.

== Awards and recognition ==
Mora has received the following awards recognizing her scholarly contributions and service:

- 2010: Distinguished Dissertation Award from the American Sociological Association for her dissertation on the institutionalization of Latino panethnicity
- 2015: Latina/Latino Sociology Award from the American Sociological Association for her article "Cross-Field Effects and Ethnic Classification: The Institutionalization of Hispanic Panethnicity, 1965 to 1990" published in American Sociological Review
- 2018: Early Career Award from the Section on Racial and Ethnic Minorities (SREM) of the American Sociological Association, recognizing distinguished contributions to research on race and ethnicity in sociology
- 2020: Latinx Service Recognition Award from the Alianza Latinx Staff Association recognizing her contributions to Latinx advancement at UC Berkeley
- 2021: Graduate Mentoring Award from UC Berkeley, recognizing her exceptional mentorship of graduate students
- 2022: Chancellor's Award for Advancing Institutional Excellence and Equity, UC Berkeley's highest honor for contributions to diversity, equity, inclusion, belonging, and justice through research, teaching, and service

== Impact and public intellectualism ==
Mora's work focuses on Hispanic/Latino identity, census classification, immigration politics, and racial inequality. She has been featured in national media including The Atlantic, The New Yorker, NPR's Latino USA, and the Hispanic Executive podcast. Her research on the social construction of the Hispanic/Latino category has influenced public discourse on racial classification, ethnic identity, and panethnic solidarity. Her work has had particular influence on debates concerning the 2020 U.S. Census, in which the Census Bureau considered merging the race and ethnicity questions — a proposal for which Mora's research on the historical contingency of census categories provided background information. In 2025, she appeared in educational video content addressing the stakes of Latinx representation in America.
