= Technical Intern Training Program =

Work training program in Japan

The Technical Intern Training Program (技能実習制度, Ginō Jisshū Seido) is a work training program providing employment opportunities for foreign nationals in Japan.

Technical Intern can work for up to five years in Japan: 1 gou (1st year – Basic level), 2 gou (2nd and 3rd year – Intermediate), 3 gou (4th and 5th year – Advanced). Technical Interns who have completed 2 gou or 3 gou can continue to work under the specified skill status.

When the system was first established, administered by the Japan International Training Cooperation Organization (JITCO) its stated purpose is to provide training, technical skills and technology experience for workers from developing economies.

The government-run internship aims to support the international cooperation program and was first established in 1993.

Since the Labor Standards Act was not applied at the start of the system, some workplaces have engaged practices such as the non-payment of wages and poor working environments. It has been accused of being a modern slavery system.

== Participation ==
According to Ministry of Justice data, there were 192,655 technical interns in Japan under the terms of the program as of 2015, an increase of about 15% from the previous year. In 2017, China was the largest source of interns, at 46.2% of the total, followed by Vietnam at 29.9% and the Philippines at 9.2%.

In 2019, almost half of 410,000 Vietnamese workers participated in the TITP program.

In December 2019, 328,360 foreign workers were registered as technical trainees.

According to Japan's Ministry of Health, Labour, and Welfare, approximately 35,000 workplaces hosted interns as of the end of 2015. Small businesses in rural locations in Japan employ many of the trainees, who are often hosted by local commerce and industry groups and small-business associations. Approximately 42% of trainees work in the seafood processing industry, and as Mazumi finds, in contrast to some criticisms that trainees take jobs from domestic workers, in the seafood processing industry trainees are mostly found in regions which suffer from a shortage of a stable (non-seasonal) workforce. In these areas, "the larger the employment size of the seafood processing industry in the local labor market, and the higher the productivity of the industry, the higher the share of migrants in the local labor force."

== History of institutional reform ==
- July 2010 – Revision of the Immigration Control and Refugee Recognition Act. Establishment of the "technical training" residence status.
- November 2016 – Technical Intern Training Act enacted
- January 2017 – Establishment of Organization for Technical Intern Training (OTIT)
- November 2017 – Technical Intern Training Act comes into force

Since the 2017 system changes, the OTIT has placed a particular emphasis on the protection of Technical Interns. Under the new system, the OTIT focuses on compliance (with laws and regulations), additional schemes (3 gou), and the protection of Technical Interns.

As of 2024 the system stands to be abolished and replaced by a new system that focuses on "employment for skills development." The new system's plan hopes to not only train foreign workers but also encourage those who complete the program to transition to a special skilled workers visa that allows for longer stay. The new system is planned to come into effect in April 2027, replacing the Technical Intern Training Program.

== Organization for Technical Intern Training ==
The OTIT conducts regular on-site inspections, every year for each Supervising organization, and every 3 years for each Implementing organization.

If an on-site inspection finds violations of the law, administrative action may be taken, such as revocation of the permit or certification.

== Criticism ==
The program has come under increasing scrutiny for alleged labour rights violations, occupational health and safety issues and lax administrative oversight. It has also faced criticism that the trainees are forced to work overtime and are subject to unsafe working conditions.

In 2016, the United States Department of State's Trafficking in Persons Report pointed out that the program "originally designed to foster basic technical skills among foreign workers has effectively become a guest worker program." The report says many interns are "placed in jobs that do not teach or develop technical skills." The program was criticized for trying to counteract the lack of low-skilled workers around the business sector.

According to official figures from the Japanese Ministry of Justice in 2019, between 2012 and 2017 about 171 trainees died during the program. The investigation also revealed that 759 cases of suspected abuse had taken place.

Several Japanese organizations and politicians have demanded the Technical Intern Training Program to be abolished, among them Solidarity Network with Migrants Japan (SMJ), the Japan Federation of Bar Associations (JFBA), as well as the current Minister for Administrative Reform and Regulatory Reform, Tarō Kōno (LDP).

== See also ==
- Japan International Training Cooperation Organization
