= Ian Reifowitz =

American historian

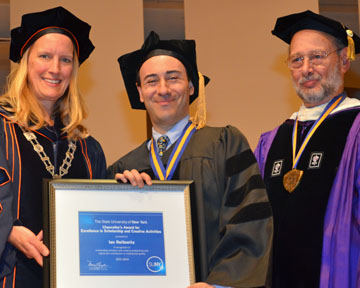
Ian Reifowitz being presented the S.U.N.Y. Chancellor's Award for Excellence in Scholarship by Empire State University President Merodie Hancock and Long Island Dean Michael Spitzer

Ian Reifowitz is SUNY Distinguished Professor of Historical Studies at Empire State University of the State University of New York. He is the author of four books, the most recent of which was published in 2025, and writes commentary on American politics and society. His research focuses on political rhetoric relating to issues of ethnic and national identity in multiethnic societies, including Austria-Hungary in the late nineteenth and early twentieth centuries, and the contemporary United States. His books on American politics have examined Barack Obama, Rush Limbaugh, and Donald Trump. Reifowitz is a contributing author for the Progressive Policy Institute, was a contributing editor/writer at Daily Kos, and has also published articles in various print media outlets.

== Media ==
Reifowitz's most recent book, Riling Up the Base: Examining Trump's Use of Stereotypes through an Interdisciplinary Lens, was published in 2025. Also that year he published an essay, "How Democrats Lost Sight of Obama's Vision of National Identity" for the Progressive Policy Institute. Reifowitz appeared on a number of podcasts to discuss Riling Up the Base, including Open Book, hosted by Anthony Scaramucci, and the Daily Blast, hosted by Greg Sargent. Reifowitz discussed his 2019 book, The Tribalization of Politics: How Rush Limbaugh's Race-Baiting Rhetoric on the Obama Presidency Paved the Way for Trump, on The Thom Hartmann Program and on the PBS program Story in the Public Square, among other outlets. Reifowitz was quoted extensively in articles published upon the conservative host's death in February 2021. He has appeared on Fox News, Channel 5 New York (WNYW) News, France 24 News, Spectrum News NY 1, and One America News Network among other outlets as a guest commentator on U.S. politics and society.

Reifowitz's 2012 book Obama's America received a strongly positive review in the academic journal Presidential Studies Quarterly, where reviewer Michael R. Kramer called it "a thorough and carefully expounded study of President Barack Obama, inclusiveness, and national identity...a relevant, thoughtful read." Reifowitz's 2019 book The Tribalization of Politics earned an equally positive review from University of North Carolina-Chapel Hill professor Daniel Kreiss, which was published in Volume 57, Number 5 (January 2020) of Choice, the journal of the Association of College and Research Libraries. Kreiss stated: "Reifowitz shows how Limbaugh’s rhetoric worked to make white identity salient and stoke white fears of a changing country. Through a series of richly detailed cases, Reifowitz demonstrates the ways that Limbaugh constructed this narrative time and again throughout president Obama’s tenure and provided a template for Trump," and called the book's argument "convincing." Reifowitz's published writings, both academic and mainstream, are cited widely.

Reifowitz was criticized by name in Hugh Hewitt's 2006 book Painting the Map Red: The Fight to Create a Permanent Republican Majority (Regnery, 2006). Ramesh Ponnuru of the National Review wrote a post in 2005 titled "Ian Reifowitz." Both of these criticized a 2005 article (link no longer available) Reifowitz published in The New Republic.

Reifowitz was also a contestant, appearing on March 30 and April 2, 2000, on Who Wants to Be a Millionaire.

== Awards ==
In 2014 Reifowitz won a S.U.N.Y. Chancellor's Award for Excellence in Scholarship and Creative Activities, and in 2009 won Empire State University's Susan H. Turben Award for Excellence in Scholarship.

== Books ==
- Riling Up the Base: Examining Trump's Use of Stereotypes through an Interdisciplinary Lens. DeGruyter Brill. August 2025. ISBN 9783111426921
- The Tribalization of Politics: How Rush Limbaugh's Race-Baiting Rhetoric on the Obama Presidency Paved the Way for Trump. Ig Publishing. June 2019. ISBN 9781632460912
- Obama’s America: A Transformative Vision of Our National Identity. Potomac Books. July 2012. ISBN 978-1-61234-472-0
- Imagining an Austrian Nation: Joseph Samuel Bloch and the Search for a Multiethnic Austrian Identity, 1846-1919 East European Monographs; distributed by Columbia University Press. December 2003. ISBN 9780880335294
