= Monoethnicity =

Existence of a single ethnic group in a region or country

Monoethnicity is the existence of a single ethnic group in a given region or country. It is the opposite of polyethnicity.

An example of a largely monoethnic country is Japan. It is a common belief in Japan that the entire country is monoethnic, but a few ethnic minorities live in Japan (e.g. Koreans, Ainus, and Ryukyuans). They represent around 2.3% of the whole population.

South Korea is another monoethnic country. There are small immigrant populations that exist in South Korea, where they account for around 5.2% of the South Korean population. These include around 900,000 Chinese immigrants, many of whom are of Korean descent.

Most sub-Saharan African countries have what would be considered a mono-racial society, but it is common to find dozens of ethnic groups within the same country.

The Yugoslav Wars are noted as having made Yugoslavia's successor states "de facto and de jure monoethnic nation-states", with Bosnia and Herzegovina further diving itself into mono-ethnic enclaves.

Because not all countries collect data on ethnicity, and the collection of data usually relies on self-reporting, it can be difficult to discern how monoethnic a country is.

== Monoethnic countries with more than 85% homogeneity ==
Sovereign states

Rank	Country	Population	Dominant group	%	Notes	Ref
1	North Korea	26,298,666	Korean	99.998%		
2	Egypt	111,247,248	Egyptian	99.7%		
3	Lesotho	2,227,548	Basotho	99.7%		
4	Tunisia	12,048,847	Arab-Amazigh	98%		
5	Bangladesh	168,697,184	Bengali	99%		
6	Morocco	37,387,585	Arab-Amazigh	99%	Excludes data from Western Sahara; also excludes data surrounding Andalusians (Moriscos and Sephardic Jews), whose millions of descendants have absorbed Arab identity over the course of generations.	
7	Vanuatu	318,007	Ni-Vanuatu	99%		
8	Armenia	2,976,765	Armenian	98.1%		
9	Albania	3,107,100	Albanian	98%		
10	Japan	123,219,024	Japanese	96.9%		
11	Poland	38,746,310	Polish	96.9%	This number represents the percentage of people who indicated Polish as their primary ethnicity.	
12	Tonga	104,889	Tongan	96.5%		
13	Kiribati	116,545	I-Kiribati	95.78%		
14	Marshall Islands	82,011	Marshallese	95.6%		
15	Cambodia	17,063,669	Khmer	95.4%		
16	Solomon Islands	726,799	Melanesian	95.4%		
17	Lebanon	5,364,482	Arab	97%		
18	Portugal	10,207,177	Portuguese	95%		
19	South Korea	51,117,378	Korean	94.6%	These include all foreign residents, regardless of whether they are of Korean descent or not. Many foreigners in Korea are either returning migrants or their descendants, especially the Chinese-Korean population.	
20	Nauru	9,892	Nauruan	94.6%		
21	Azerbaijan	10,650,239	Azerbaijani	91.6%		
22	Croatia	4,150,116	Croatian	91.6%		
23	China	1,416,043,270	Han Chinese	91.1% or 94%	From 1978, the Chinese government launched the "redefination of ethnic identification policy (民族成分恢复)", Han Chinese were encouraged to redefine their ethnic identity as those of ethnic minorities. Therefore, some sources prefer quoting the current official percentage reported by the Chinese government (91.1%), but others still prefer quoting the old percentage before 1978 (94%).	
24	Italy	58,947,905	Italian	91%		
25	Saudi Arabia	36,544,431	Arab	90%		
26	Finland	5,603,851	Finns	89.8%		
27	Romania	18,148,155	Romanian	89.3%	Data represents only those who declared an ethnicity in the 2021 census	
28	Turkmenistan	5,744,151	Turkmen	87.6%		
29	Georgia	4,900,961	Georgian	86.8%		
30	Vietnam	105,758,975	Viet	85.3%		

=== Unrecognized states and dependent territories ===
Country	Population	Dominant group	%	Ref
Palestine	5,483,450	Palestinian	91%	
Northern Cyprus	382,836	Turkish Cypriots	99.2 %	
Somaliland	6,200,000	Somalis	99%	
Taiwan	23,347,374	Han Chinese	97%	
Hong Kong	7,249,907	Han Chinese	92%	
Kosovo	1,586,659	Albanians	92%	
Greenland	55,877	Greenlandic Inuit	89.7%	
South Ossetia	53,532	Ossetians	89.9%	
Macau	614,458	Han Chinese	88.7%	
Åland	30,696	Ålanders	86.5%	

== See also ==
- Multinational state
- Ethnic cleansing
- Ethnic nationalism
- Ethnocracy
- Homogeneous
- Titular nation
