= Meta-ethnicity =

Large group of related ethnic groups who identify with each other

Meta-ethnicity is a level of commonality that is wider ("meta-") and more general (i.e., might differ on specifics) than ethnicity, but does not necessarily correspond to (and may actually transcend) nation or nationality. It is a relatively recent term (or neologism) occasionally used in academic literature or public discourse on ethnic studies. In colloquial discourse, it usually signifies a larger in-group of distinct ethnic groups who identify more closely with each other than they would with out-group ethnic groups. The groups within the in-group may be genetically and culturally related which reinforces the grouping.

An early use—possibly the first published in English—was an article in a 1984 USSR Academy of Sciences publication discussing identity in Asia and Africa.

== Examples of use ==
Some other examples:

- Gurharpal Singh, Ethnic Conflict in India: A Case-Study of Punjab (New York: Palgrave, 2000).
- Gurharpal Singh, "Against this dominant view of the nature of the Indian state, Singh argues that India should be seen as an 'ethnic democracy' in which Hinduism works as a meta-ethnicity and in which hegemonic control is exercised over ethnic minorities, particularly those living in the peripheral regions" in Christopher Shackle, Gurharpal Singh and Arvind-Pal Mandair eds., Sikh Religion, Culture and Ethnicity (Curson: 2001), p.155.
- "L. Byzov, however, believes that 'there has taken place within the Russian national consciousness one of the most radical changes ever: from a meta-ethnic sense of identity to a strictly ethnic identity' (Byzov 1996, 45)."
- "Geoffrey Fox, on the other hand, argues that 'Hispanic', with its emphasis on Spanish-language heritage as the foundation of meta-ethnicity, has no implied racial or class agendas and is simply preferred by most immigrants from Latin America." ... "Furthermore, these split-level processes of identity formation—the forging of ethnicity and meta-ethnicity—take place in regional contexts of unequal ethnic control over media and symbol systems."
- Peter Turchin introduces the concept "metaethnic frontier theory" in his 2003 book, Historical Dynamics: Why States Rise and Fall
- According to Hussain, Imtiaz, "At the beginning of the new century, Chinese people are living the construction of a metaethnicity of multiple identities."

== See also ==
- Multiethnic society
- Panethnicity
