= Polyethnicity =

Mutual interactions between ethnicities

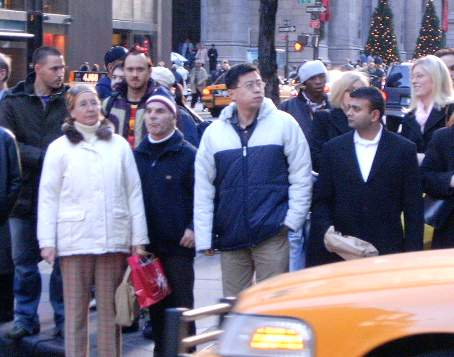
Polyethnicity in New York City

Polyethnicity, also known as pluri-ethnicity or multi-ethnicity, refers to specific cultural phenomena that are characterized by social proximity and mutual interaction of people from different ethnic backgrounds, within a country or other specific geographic region.

These same terms may also relate to the ability and willingness of individuals to identify themselves with multiple ethnicities. It occurs when multiple ethnicities inhabit a given area, specifically through means of immigration, intermarriage, trade, conquest and post-war land-divisions. This has had many political and social implications on countries and regions.

Many, if not all, countries have some degree of polyethnicity, with countries like Nigeria and Canada having high levels and countries like Japan and Poland having very low levels (and more specifically, a sense of homogeneity). The amount of polyethnicity prevalent in some Western countries has spurred some arguments against it, which include a belief that it leads to the weakening of each society's strengths, and also a belief that political-ethnic issues in countries with polyethnic populations are better handled with different laws for certain ethnicities.

== Conceptual history ==
In 1985, Canadian historian William H. McNeill gave a series of three lectures on polyethnicity in ancient and modern cultures at the University of Toronto. The main thesis throughout his lectures was the argument that it has been the cultural norm for societies to be composed of different ethnic groups. McNeill argued that the ideal of homogeneous societies may have grown between 1750 and 1920 in Western Europe because of the growth in the belief in a single nationalistic base for the political organization of society. McNeill believed that during World War I, the desire for homogeneous nations began to weaken.

== Impact on politics ==
Polyethnicity may complicate politically, as local and national governments attempt to satisfy all ethnic groups. Many politicians in countries attempt to find the balance between ethnic identities within their country and the identity of the nation as a whole. Nationalism also plays a large part in these political debates, as cultural pluralism and consociationalism are the democratic alternatives to nationalism for the polyethnic state.

The idea of nationalism being social instead of ethnic entails a variety of culture, a shared sense of identity and a community not based on descent. Culturally-plural states vary constitutionally between a decentralized and unitary state (such as the United Kingdom) and a federal state (such as Belgium, Switzerland, and Canada). Ethnic parties in these polyethnic regions are not anti-state but instead seek maximum power within this state. Many polyethnic countries face that dilemma with their policy decisions. The following nations and regions are just a few specific examples of this dilemma and its effects:

=== United States ===
U.S. languages (2006)
English (only)	224.2 million
Spanish, incl. Creole	34.0 million
Chinese	2.5 million
French, incl. Creole	2.0 million
Tagalog	1.4 million
Vietnamese	1.2 million
German	1.1 million
Korean	1.1 million

The United States is a nation founded by different ethnicities frequently described as coming together in a "melting pot," a term used to emphasize the degree to which constituent groups influence and are influenced by each other, or a "salad bowl," a term more recently coined in contrast to the "melting pot" metaphor and emphasizing those groups' retention of fundamentally distinct identities despite their proximity to each other and their influence on the overall culture that all of those groups inhabit.

A controversial political issue in recent years has been the question of bilingualism. Many immigrants have come from Hispanic America, who are native Spanish speakers, in the past centuries and have become a significant minority and even a majority in many areas of the Southwest. In New Mexico the Spanish speaking population exceeds 40%. Disputes have emerged over language policy, since a sizeable part of the population, and in many areas the majority of the population, speak Spanish as a native language.

The biggest debates are over bilingual education for language minority students, the availability of non-English ballots and election materials and whether or not English is the official language. It has evolved into an ethnic conflict between the pluralists who support bilingualism and linguistic access and the assimilationists who strongly oppose this and lead the official English movement. The United States does not have an official language, but English is the de facto national language and is spoken by the overwhelming majority of the country's population.

=== Canada ===
Canada has had many political debates between the French speakers and English speakers, particularly in the province of Quebec. Canada holds both French and English as official languages. The politics in Quebec are largely defined by nationalism as some French Québécois wish to gain independence from Canada as a whole, based on ethnic and linguistic boundaries. The main separatist party, Parti Québécois, attempted to gain sovereignty twice (once in 1980 and again in 1995) and failed by a narrow margin of 1.2% in 1995. Since then, in order to remain united, Canada granted Quebec statut particulier, recognizing Quebec as a nation within the united nation of Canada.

=== Belgium ===
The divide between the Dutch-speaking north (Flanders) and the French-speaking South (Wallonia) has caused the parliamentary democracy to become ethnically polarized. Though an equal number of seats in the Chamber of Representatives are prescribed to the Flemish and Walloons, Belgian political parties have all divided into two ideologically identical but linguistically and ethnically different parties. The political crisis has grown so bad in recent years that the partition of Belgium has been feared.

=== Ethiopia ===
Ethiopia is a polyethnic nation consisting of 80 different ethnic groups and 84 indigenous languages. The diverse population and the rural areas throughout the nation made it nearly impossible to create a strong centralized state, but it was eventually accomplished through political evolution. Prior to 1974, nationalism was discussed only within radical student groups, but by the late 20th century, the issue had come to the forefront of political debate.

Ethiopia was forced to modernize their political system to properly handle nationalism debates. The Derg military government took control with a Marxist–Leninist ideology, urging self-determination and rejecting compromise over any nationality issues. In the 1980s, Ethiopia suffered a series of famines and, after the Soviet Union broke apart, lost its aid from the Soviets; the Derg government later collapsed. Eventually, Ethiopia restabilized and adopted a modern political system that models a federal parliamentary republic.

It was still impossible to create a central government holding all power and so the central government was torn. It now presides over ethnically based regional states, and each ethnic state is granted the right to establish its own government with democracy.

=== Spain ===
In Spain from 1808 to 1814, the Spanish War of Independence took place in a multicultural Spain. Spain, at the time, was then under the control of King Joseph Bonaparte, who was Napoleon Bonaparte's brother. Because they were under the control of French rule, the Spanish formed coalitions of ethnic groups to reclaim their own political representation to replace the French political system, which had lost power.

=== Southeast Asia ===
Southeast Asia countries, 2009-10-10

In Southeast Asia the continental area (Myanmar, Thailand, Laos, Cambodia and Vietnam) generally practices Theravada or Mahayana Buddhism. Most of insular Southeast Asia (namely Malaysia, Brunei and Indonesia) practices mostly Sunni Islam. The rest of the insular region (Philippines and East Timor) practices mostly Roman Catholic Christianity and Singapore practises mostly Mahayana Buddhism.

Significant long-distance labor migration that occurred during the late 19th century and the early 20th century provided many different types of ethnic diversity. Relations between the indigenous population of the region arose from regional variations of cultural and linguistic groups. Immigrant minorities, especially the Chinese, then developed as well. Although there were extreme political differences for each minority and religion, they were still legitimate members of political communities, and there has been a significant amount of unity throughout history. This differs from both nearby East and South Asia.

== Impact on society ==
Polyethnicity, over time, can change the way societies practice cultural norms.

=== Marriage ===
An increase in intermarriage in the United States has led to the blurring of ethnic lines. Anti-miscegenation laws (laws banning interracial marriages) were abolished in the United States in 1967 and now it is estimated that one-fifth of the population in the United States by 2050 will be part of the polyethnic population. In 2000, self-identified Multiracial Americans numbered 6.8 million or 2.4% of the population.

While the number of interethnic marriages is on the rise, there are certain ethnic groups that have been found more likely to become polyethnic and recognize themselves with more than one ethnic background. Bhavani Arabandi states in his article on polyethnicity that:

Asians and Latinos have much higher rates of interethnic marriages than do blacks, and they are more likely to report polyethnicity than blacks who more often claim a single ethnicity and racial identity. This is the case, the authors [Lee, J & Bean, F.D] argue, because blacks have a "legacy of slavery," a history of discrimination, and have been victimized by the "one-drop rule" (where having any black blood automatically labeled one as black) in the US.

=== Military ===
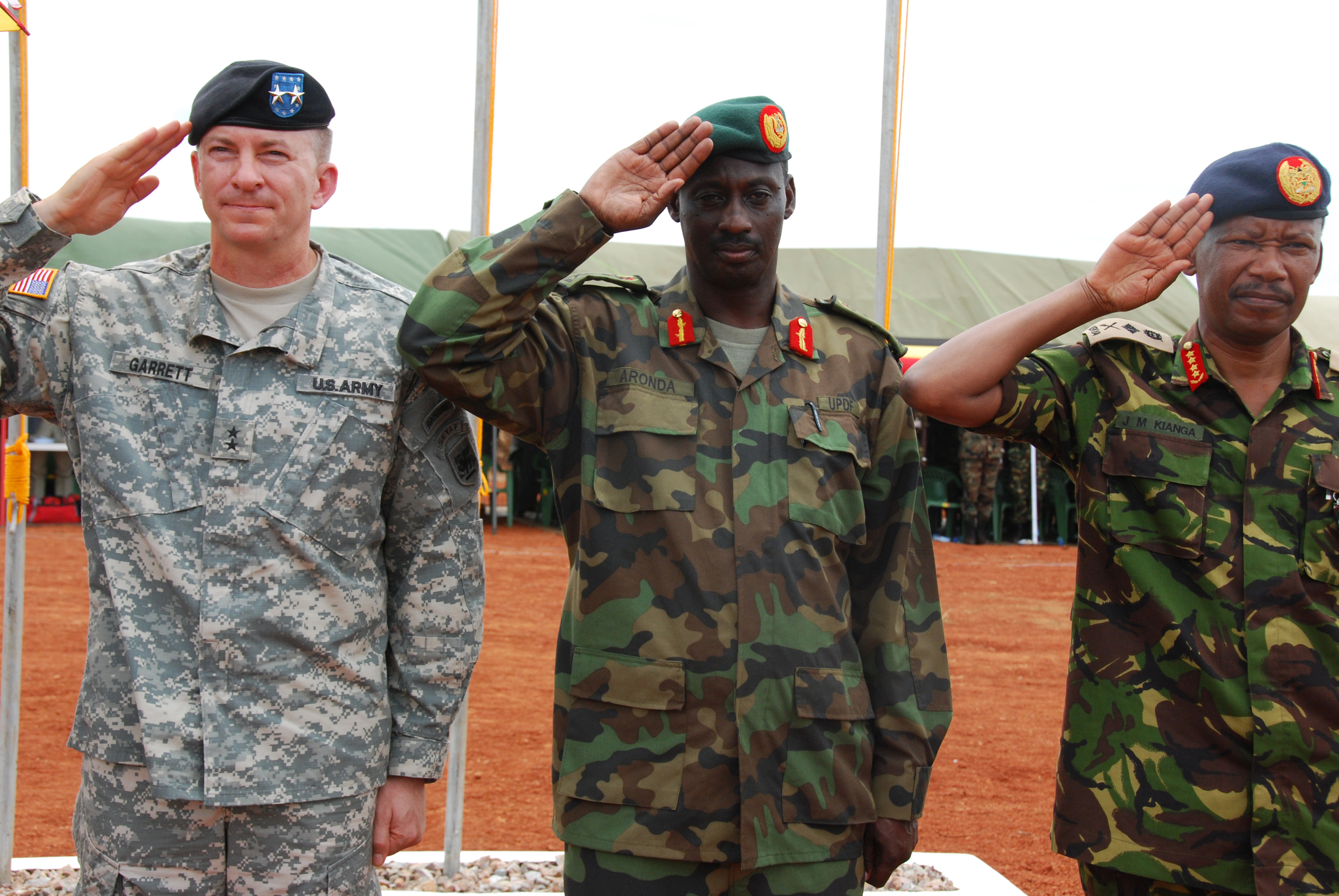
Maj. Gen. William B. Garrett III, commander of U.S. Army Africa, Gen. Nyakayirima Aronda, Chief of Defense Forces, Ugandan People's Defense Force and Gen. Jeremiah Kianga, Chief of General Staff, Kenya, render honors during the opening ceremony for Natural Fire 10, Kitgum, Uganda, Oct. 16, 2009.

Presently, most armed forces are composed of people from different ethnic backgrounds. They are considered to be polyethnic due to the differences in race, ethnicity, language or background. While there are many examples of polyethnic forces, the most prominent are among the largest armed forces in the world, including those of the United States, the former Soviet Union, and China. Polyethnic armed forces are not a new phenomenon since multi-ethnic forces existed during the Roman Empire, the Middle Eastern Empires, and even the Mongol Khans. The US military was one of the first modern militaries to begin ethnic integration, by order of President Harry Truman in 1945.

== Criticisms ==
There are also arguments against polyethnicity, as well as the assimilation of ethnicities in polyethnic regions. Wilmot Robertson in The Ethnostate and Dennis L. Thomson in The Political Demands of Isolated Indian Bands in British Columbia, argue for some level of separatism.

In The Ethnostate, Robertson declares polyethnicity as an ideal that only lessens each culture. He believes that, within a polyethnic culture, the nation or region as a whole is less capable of cultural culmination than each of the individual ethnicities that make it up. Essentially, polyethnicity promotes the dilution of ethnicity and thus hinders each ethnicity in all aspects of culture.

In The Political Demands of Isolated Indian Bands in British Columbia, Thomson points out the benefits in some level (albeit small) of separatist policies. He argues the benefits of allowing ethnic groups, like the Amish and the Hutterites in the United States and Canada or the Sami in Norway, to live on the edges of governance. These are ethnic groups that would prefer to retain their ethnic identity and thus prefer separatist policies for themselves, as they do not require them to conform to policies for all ethnicities of the nation.

== See also ==
- Diaspora politics
- Ethnic group
- Ethnopolitics
- Supraethnicity
- Interculturalism
- Interracial marriage
- Millet
- Multiculturalism
- Multilingualism
- Multinational state
- Nationalism
- Transnationalism
