= Metroethnicity =

Concept of Metropolitan and Ethnicity

Metroethnicity is a portmanteau of metropolitan and ethnicity. It is an ‘aesthetic’ or ‘lifestyle’ theory of language and ethnicity proposed by the British sociolinguist John C. Maher.

The theory of Metroethicity rejects cultural essentialism, and heroic ethnicity, in favour of a hybridized form of ethnicity that is utilised for aesthetic effect.

In this perspective, language should not be viewed as an enduring ethnic essence but a lifestyle ‘accessory.’ It is portable. It functions best as an aspect of personal life-style. Metroethnicity is linked to Cool because cool is basically an aesthetic phenomenon. Cool actively disconnects the ‘natural’ linkage that is often made between ethnicity and language. Cool is both an attitude as well as a facet of personal action.

This post-ethnic stance is illustrated by a young Ainu person in northern Japan: “Well, I don’t speak Ainu…be nice to speak it…but..anyway...I speak Italian ‘cause that’s where I want to be..love Italian stuff…I’m training to be an Italian chef.” (Maher 2006). In such person-driven identity traditional language is optional -not rejected but bracketed. This view of language may be confrontational a person who insists language and ethnicity should line up. The ethnic view fosters ethnic allegiance, even orthodoxy. By contrast, "Metroethnicity is a kind of post ethnicity state whereby both we play with ethnicity (not necessarily our own) for aesthetic effect. It involves cultural crossing, self-definition made up of borrowing and bricolage of blurred ‘identities’, what one might term ‘metroethnicity’. The operating system of this metroethnicity is ‘Cool’” (Maher 2005).
