= Tozen =

Japanese labour union

Zenkoku Ippan Tokyo General Union (Tozen Union)
- 全国一般東京ゼネラルユニオン
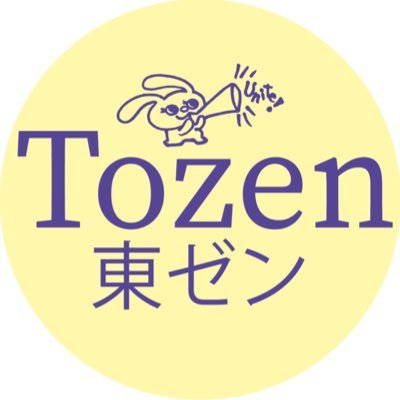
- Nickname: Tozen Union (東ゼン労組)
- Founded: 25 April 2010
- Founder: Louis Carlet, Anthony Dolan, David Ashton
- Headquarters: Tokyo
- Location: Japan
- President: Okunuki Hifumi
- Website: tozenunion.org

Zenkoku Ippan Tokyo General Union (Japanese: 全国一般東京ゼネラルユニオン), or Tozen Union (Japanese: 東ゼン労組), is a Japanese labour union. It was founded on April 25, 2010, by Louis Carlet, Tony Dolan, and David Ashton. It is a "godo roso" general amalgamated union, the first ever in Japan with foreigners holding all three top executive positions.

Although membership is not restricted to any particular industry, Tozen's members tend to be from the publishing, banking, universities and foreign language teaching industries, with most members located in the Kanto region.

The headquarters executive is composed of over 20 members, including Executive President Hifumi Okunuki, and Vice-president Tony Dolan.

== Founding of the union ==
Tozen Union was created when foreign and Japanese members of National Union of General Workers Tokyo Nambu defected. The NUGW is an older union which traces its roots back to 1956, with the founding of Jōnan Chūshō Gōdō Rōdōkumiai (城南中小合同労働組合).

In 1994, the National Union of General Workers Tokyo South was formed, then renamed NUGW Tokyo Nambu in 2003. In 2004, the Foreign Workers Caucus was formed inside Nambu, which would eventually come to have 11 local branches.

On April 25, 2010, six of these branches voted to separate from Nambu and form Tozen. Many other Nambu branches followed later.

Tozen obtained official corporate registration in July 2010, according to its own website.

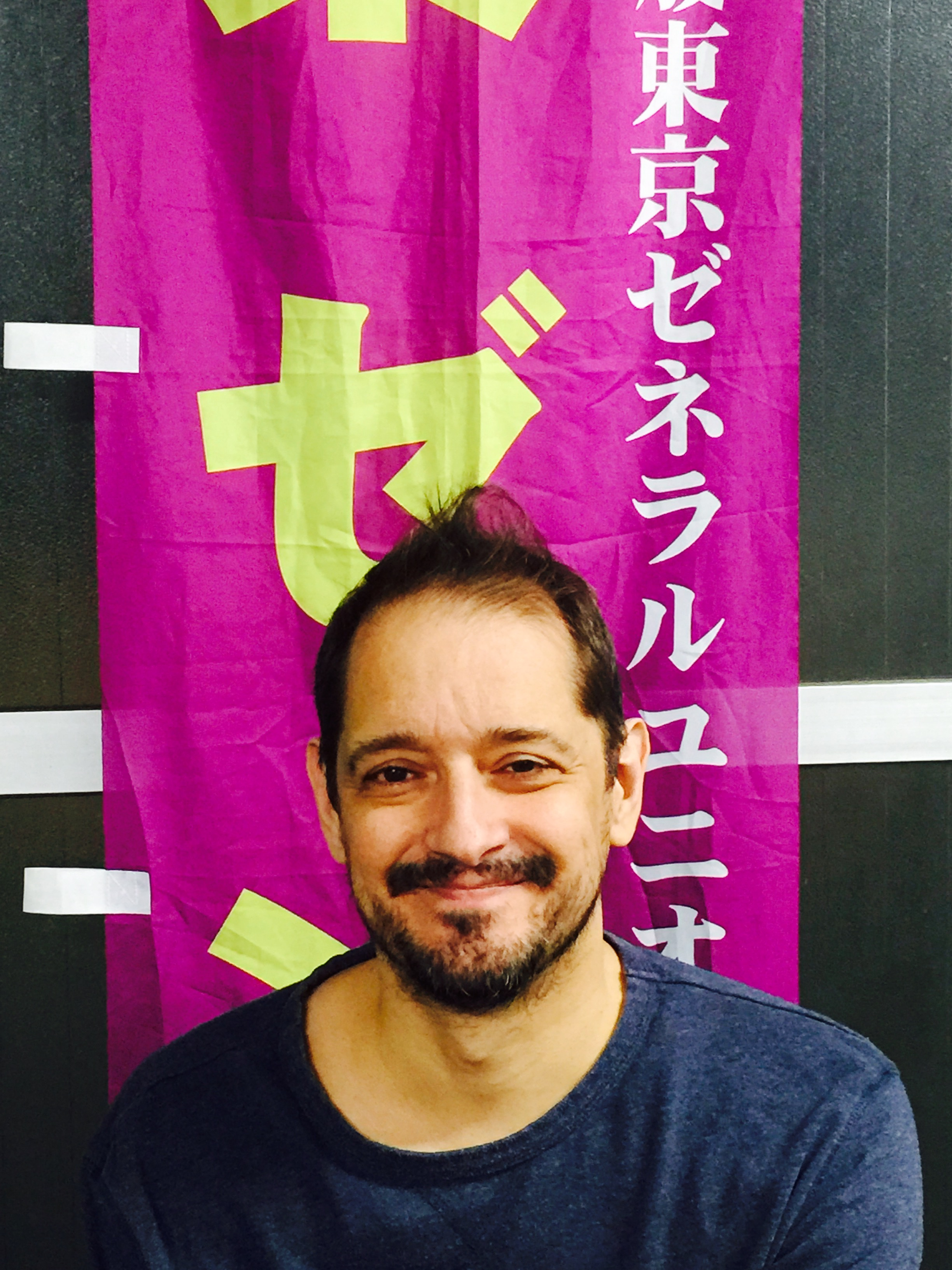
Tozen Union Founder Louis Carlet

While Tozen uses General Union in its name, it is not affiliated in any way to the General Union, Fukuoka General Union of the National Union of General Workers Tokyo Nambu. Tozen and General Union both have locals/branches at Gaba, Nova, Bunsai Gakuen, Shane, Berlitz and Interac. Tozen is also not a member of any National Union of General Workers national unions.

== Locals ==
As of September 13, 2022, Tozen Union has 30 local chapters at different workplaces, including: The Japan Times, Linguaphone, Philippine National Bank, Syndicat des Employés de l’Institut Franco-japonais, Lyceé français international de Tokyo, Sophia University, Gaba, Apple Japan, Japan College of Foreign Languages, Nichibei Eikaiwa, Shibaura Institute of Technology, Simul Academy, Coco Juku (Nichii Gakkan), Mitsui Fuso, NCC, English Express, Shane English School, Berlitz (Begunto Union). A local union was formed in June 2020 called ALC Local Union. Tozen also represents ALTs at various companies as well as university workers and teachers.

== Actions ==
Tozen and has taken action through the courts and industrial relations bureaucracy a number of times as well as engaging in strikes, leafleting, demonstrations, rallies and freedom of information campaigns. Tozen President (former Paralegal) Hifumi Okunuki began in February 2012 a column in the Japan Times called Labor Pains, in which she details famous labor law court cases. She also writes for Shingetsu News Agency.

Then Executive President Louis Carlet on March 11, 2011, spoke to Democracy Now! about the situation in Tokyo after the Great East Japan Earthquake.

Tozen was cited by the U.S. State Department's human rights report on Japan for the union's long campaign to enroll teachers in shakai hoken health and pension insurance. Tozen also spoke with political activist Noam Chomsky in March 2014.

== Visit to Iceland ==
Between February 27 and March 11, 2019, Tozen Union President Hifumi Okunuki, Chief Financial Officer Louis Carlet, and Field Director (and Rengo Trade Union Confederation Executive) Gerome Rothman participated in a guest lecture series organized by Iceland's second largest labour union, Efling.

Based on an invitation from Efling's Organizing Division (Félagssvið), on March 3, 2019, Tozen Union gave a presentation about its structure, history, range of activity, and the basics of Japanese labour law. The event was live-streamed.

And on March 5, 2019, Tozen Union led a workshop on the subject of workplace organizing.

On March 8, 2019, Hifumi Okunuki, and Louis Carlet were interviewed by Icelandic television about Efling's one-day maids' strike covering the whole of Reykjavík, which took place on the same date.

== Notable legal victories ==
=== The Language of Labour Relations ===
While most foreign workers in Japan are employed in the context of their native language, or English, both at the time of hiring and during their day-to-day workplace operations, employers typically attempt to dominate foreign union members by refusing to negotiate in the language of the workplace. In response Tozen Union invented and endeavours to establish the concept of The Language of Labour Relations, which contends that employers are not allowed to suddenly use a different language when their employees begin Collective Bargaining.

In a 2016 Tokyo Labour Commission ruling on Tozen Union's case against Tokyo Gakugei University, the commission established that employers are not allowed to unilaterally establish the conditions of Collective Bargaining, confirming that this includes the language in which negotiations will take place.

=== The right to strike for independent contractors ===
In an October 2019 Tokyo Labour Commission ruling, the commission established that teachers hired by Gaba Corporation as independent contractors have the right to strike. Tozen union and its Gaba Union Local sued Gaba Corporation to overturn warning letters issued to striking teachers. Gaba Corporation claimed that its over 1000 teachers were independent contractors, and thus were not protected by the rights of workers and Japan's Trade Union act. In a previous Osaka Labour Commission case victory filed by the General Union, the commission had recognized these employees' right to Collectively Bargain. Gaba Corporation management tried to nullify the impact of the ruling by claiming that even if the teachers had the right to Collective Bargaining, they didn't have the right to strike, which the Tokyo Labour Commission rejected based on Tozen's arguments. In Japan, the right to Solidarity, Collective Bargaining, and Collective Action (including strikes) are set in Article 28 of the Constitution, and cannot be divided.

== See also ==
- Labor unions in Japan
- Japanese employment law
