= Coco Juku =

English conversation school in Japan

- Type: Private
- Industry: Education
- Founded: April 2012
- Defunct: March 31, 2018
- Headquarters: Tokyo, Japan,
- Owner: Nichii Gakkan
- Website: http://cocojuku.jp/

Coco Juku (COCO塾), which stands for Communication Competence, was an English conversation school (eikaiwa) in Japan. The school was founded in 2012 by Nichii Gakkan, which also owns the English conversation school Gaba Corporation. Coco Juku's lessons began on April 10, 2012, and the "Coco Junior" program for children began in April 2013.

From 2013 it also began offering Japanese lessons under the name "Japanese course for foreigners".

On March 31, 2018, Coco Juku ended service. Its parent company still operated schools under the Coco Juku name for children, Coco Juku Junior. These were all closed by March 31, 2020.

== Branches ==
In April 2012, Coco Juku opened for business at six locations, and planned to open 92 locations within their first year. As of June 2015 it had 80 locations across Japan. As of December 2018 it had 72.

After poor business performance 51 of the locations were closed by March 31, 2019 with the remainder being closed soon afterwards.

== Unions ==
Coco Juku required all employees, including foreign teachers, to belong to their in-house union, the Nichii Gakkan Union (ニチイ学館労働組合).

In addition, some instructors belonged to the General Union.

=== General Union ===
==== Final payment for employees ====
Article 23 of Japan's Labor Standards Act states that when a worker completes work for an employer their final payment should be paid within seven days. Coco Juku does not follow this rule and pays employees the next month. In 2014 a Coco Juku employee who was resigning requested his pay within the seven days mandated by law, and was refused. The General Union became involved and made contact with Nichii Gakkan, the parent company of Coco Juku. Nichii Gakkan ordered Coco Juku to make the payment within the seven days, which the company did.

==== Company shutdown ====
After the closing down of the company was announced in early 2019, instructors teaching English were offered either three months severance package or to be transferred to Gaba Corporation, also owned by Nichii Gakkan. The General Union negotiated with the company and gained continued employment at 100% payment of salary while negotiations were ongoing.

== Advertising ==
After an initial 2012 advertising campaign featuring "Dr Coco", a suited foreign man, the company changed tack and, from later in 2012, launched a series of advertisements using well-known Japanese actor Yūsuke Iseya.

== See also ==
- Nichii Gakkan
- Gaba Corporation
