= Advocates for Injured Workers =

Student legal clinic in Toronto, Canada

Advocates for Injured Workers (AIW) is a student legal clinic operating in Toronto and affiliated with the University of Toronto Faculty of Law. This clinic is supervised by the Industrial Accident Victims' Group of Ontario (IAVGO)—itself a community legal clinic funded by Legal Aid Ontario.

Advocates for Injured Workers provides free legal representation for low-income clients who have been injured in workplace accidents or have suffered onset occupational injuries. AIW deals almost exclusively with claims under the Workplace Safety and Insurance Act, which are made to the Workplace Safety & Insurance Board (WSIB) of Ontario and may be appealed to the Workplace Safety and Insurance Appeals Tribunal (WSIAT). Very occasionally the clinic may also represent clients in consequential actions that stem from a workplace injury, such as actions before the Ontario Labour Relations Board (OLRB) and the Ontario Human Rights Commission (OHRC).

The clinic is staffed by approximately twenty-five part-time student volunteers during the academic year, and during the summer by eight full-time student employees. Every caseworker is responsible for their own individual client files. Upper-year volunteers have the opportunity to pursue clinical work for course credit. The clinic carries around one hundred active files at a time.
