= Equal Employment Opportunity Law (Japan) =

The Act on Ensuring Equal Opportunities for and Treatment of Men and Women in Employment (Japanese: 雇用の分野における男女の均等な機会及び待遇の確保等に関する法律), commonly known as the Equal Employment Opportunity Law (Japanese: 男女雇用機会均等法), is a Japanese labor law, passed in May 1985 and implemented in April 1986, designed to implement an earlier law, the Act on Equal Opportunity Between Men and Women in Employment, requiring equal employment opportunities between men and women, passed in 1972. This law also provided amendments to the Japanese Labor Standards Act of 1947 and the Working Women's Welfare Law.

The law provides for a Conciliation Commission to arbitrate disputes between women and their employers, along with placing specific legal protections into law. The law also establishes what equal opportunities are legally expected of employers. The law has been revised twice since its passage, once in 1997, and once in 2005-2006. The 1997 revisions target discrimination in specific areas of promotion, recruitment, and hiring, while the 2005-6 revisions focus on making employers responsible for eradicating sexual harassment in the workplace.

== Provisions ==
=== Article 1 - Fringe Benefits ===
This section defines the "fringe benefits" that the government's Ministry of Health, Labor, and Welfare will provide to further the goal of equal opportunity. These rights include: home lending, disbursing funds for the welfare of workers, and lending money for living or educational expenses.

=== Article 2 - Measures That May Cause Substantial Discrimination Due to a Person's Sex ===
This applies the law to three sets of actions an employer takes that the law mainly applies to. The three sections include: recruitment, hiring, physical requirements, promotions, job reassignments, and relocation.

==== Article 2-2 - Reasons Relating to Pregnancy or Childbirth ====
This section applies the law to specific situations related to pregnancy and childbirth. These reasons contain: pregnancy, childbirth, leave requests, reduction of responsibilities, work and overtime hours, overtime, child care time-off requests, and decline in physical abilities due to childbirth.

==== Article 2-3 - Time Off Requirements ====
This section requires employers to allow for specific amounts of time off related to the weeks of pregnancy for the purposes of receiving medical care. The law also stipulates that up to a year after childbirth, the employer must allow for sufficient time off for medical care.

=== Article 3 - Chief of the Conciliation Commission ===
This section provides for the appointment of the Chief of the Conciliation Commission and gives the Chief the power to preside over meetings. It also provides for the Chief's Deputy, who can preside in the unavoidable absence of the Chief, to be appointed by the Chief.

=== Article 4 - Equal Opportunity Conciliation Conference ===
This article establishes the Equal Opportunity Conciliation Conference. The Chief convenes each conference, which requires at least 2 other commissioners in order to meet. It also states that meetings of the commission will not be open to the public.

=== Article 5 - Administrative Work of the Equal Opportunity Conciliation Conference ===
This section delegates the administrative duties of the Conference to the Equal Opportunity Department in the Prefectural Labor Office where the Conference is located.

=== Article 6 - Application for Conciliation ===
This section lays out the application process for review by the Conference. It requires a written application filed to the Director of the applicable Prefectural Labor Office.

=== Article 7 - Decision to Commence Conciliation ===
This section directs the Director of the Prefectural Labor Office who received the application to send the case to the Conference immediately after his decision to refer the matter to the Committee. The Director must also notify the parties involved in the complaint of the decision to send the case to the Committee or dismiss the complaint.

=== Article 8 - Hearing on the Circumstances from the Parties Concerned, etc. ===
This section details the procedure of a hearing. Anyone requested to attend must attend, but is allowed to bring an assistant. This assistant is legally allowed to make a statement. Any person whose presence is requested is allowed to state their opinions on the situation. Those required to attend are allowed to appoint a representative, provided that the representative is granted permission by the Chief of the Conciliation Commission. This representative is required to provide their information, including name, address, occupation, and legal document giving the right of representation to the representative.

=== Article 9 - Submission of Documents, etc. ===
This section allows the Conference to request documents relevant to each case.

=== Article 10 - Delegation of Implementing the Mediation Procedures ===
This section gives the Conference the authority to delegate portions of the procedure to one of the commissioners. Investigation of each case can also be delegated to the Equal Employment Department of a Prefectural Labor Office.

=== Article 11 - Nomination of Representatives by the Relevant Workers' or Employers' Organizations ===
This section allows for the Conference to request opinions from the relevant local employees' or employers' organizations and allows them to appoint representatives to give their opinion to the Conference. Those giving opinions must have their names and addresses provided to the Conference.

=== Article 12 - Recommendation for Acceptance of a Conciliation Proposal ===
This section requires a conciliation proposal to be unanimously agreed to by the Conference before it is presented to the parties. Once the proposal is sent, a deadline for acceptance is set for each party to accept. In order to make the acceptance official, each party must provide their signature and seal to the Conference.

=== Article 13 - Measures for Female Workers Engaged in Night Shifts ===
This section requires employers to take measures to protect female workers during transit to and from, as well as during, scheduled night shifts.

=== Article 14 - Delegation of Authority ===
This section delegates the authority of the Minister of Health, Labor, and Welfare within the act, to the local Director of the Prefectural Labor Office that has jurisdiction in the situation, unless the matter is deemed to have national significance.

== Criticisms ==
The law has been heavily criticized by many Japanese feminists for not containing penalties for employers that break the law, or providing stronger protections for women. The law also created the new practice of creating two tracks for women, the "management" track parallel to the men, and the "general employee" track specific to women, which allowed for more time off and location stability with almost no chances for advancement. The two track system was eventually implemented by almost half of Japan's largest corporations. The issue of employment also extended to the types of work women were hired to do. Most women were hired as temporary employees or part-time employees ineligible for advancement or trainings. Soon after the law's moderately successful implementation, the 1990s recession curbed the increases, and the percentage of women in the workforce dropped.

Another major criticism is the focus on pregnancy and childbirth benefits, which critics claim are a product of sexist attitudes of seeing women as mothers first. Currently, the law is seen as an imperfect attempt to solve the core concerns, with women only making up 9% of management positions, despite making up about 40% of the employee base. To try and improve the gender balance in management positions, the government set an official goal of 30% women in management roles by 2020 in 2003, but were forced to revise the goal to 15% of management in businesses and 7% in the government sector but continued to work with the original goal in mind.

The main implementation system of the law is a mediation system, based on the Japanese aversion to judicial solutions, except in rare circumstances. This has been critiqued by opponents as ineffective, allowing discrimination to still occur in Japan. The mediation process also leaned on the preference of the mediator, usually influenced by traditional cultural values. Much of the lack of required actions on the part of the employers was the largest complaint levied at the law, claiming it to be ineffective as a result. Many feminists still praised the law as a step forward, as at least a framework had been passed, but were disappointed by the lack of implementation and judicial remedies.

== See also ==
- Japanese labour law
