= Workplace Safety and Insurance Appeals Tribunal =

The Workplace Safety and Insurance Appeals Tribunal (WSIAT) is an agency of the Ontario Ministry of Labour, Government of Ontario. It is located in Toronto, Ontario at 505 University Avenue, 7th floor. The Tribunal is the final level of appeal to which workers and employers may bring disputes regarding workers' compensation matters in Ontario.

The Tribunal is separate from, and independent of, the Workplace Safety and Insurance Board (WSIB). Workers and employers who are dissatisfied with a decision of the WSIB may appeal that decision to the WSIAT.

== History ==
The WSIAT was formerly known as the Workers' Compensation Appeals Tribunal (WCAT) which was established Oct 1, 1985 by the Ontario government. In 1998, the Workplace Safety and Insurance Act came into force and changed the name of the Tribunal to Workplace Safety and Insurance Appeals Tribunal.

== Decisions ==
Decisions of the Tribunal are anonymized to protect the privacy of the injured workers and other workplace parties who appear before the Tribunal. These decisions are public and available on the Tribunal's website and on CanLII. All decisions of the Tribunal are made in writing and are usually rendered within 120 days. Some less complex appeals do not require an in-person hearing and are decided based on evidence in the file and on written submissions from the parties. WSIAT decisions are given a number rather than using the name of the worker or employer to identify the decision.

== Hearings ==
WSIAT hearings are held either by a vice-chair sitting alone, or by a three-person panel consisting of a vice-chair, a worker member and an employer member. Vice-chairs and side members are all appointed by order of the Lieutenant Governor in Council after a rigorous testing and vetting process.

Most hearings are held in the Tribunal's Toronto location, but they are also frequently held in regional centres across Ontario to serve the needs of workers and employers in those areas. Hearings may be conducted in either English or French and can last anywhere from a few hours to several days, depending on the complexity of the issues under appeal.

== Procedures ==
The Tribunal determines its own rules of practice and procedure. These rules are different than those of other Ontario tribunals or courts. The WSIAT practice directions are publicly available and offer guidance to workplace parties and their representatives who are pursuing an appeal at the Tribunal.

Information about the WSIAT's caseload can be found in the WSIAT's Annual Reports which are publicly available on the WSIAT's website.

== Library ==
The Ontario Workplace Tribunals Library (OWTL) is an information resource centre open to members of the public and located inside the WSIAT on the 7th floor. Library staff assists workers, employers and their representatives by collecting and organizing materials related to occupational health and safety, human rights/discrimination, pay equity, labour relations and employment law, administrative law and other related subjects. In addition to the Tribunal, the Library provides services to the staff of the Ontario Labour Relations Board, and the Pay Equity Hearings Tribunal.
