= AIW =

AIW may refer to:

- International Union, Allied Industrial Workers of America
- Advocates for Injured Workers, a Toronto-based legal clinic
- American Iron Works, a commercial steel design and fabrication company in Washington, DC
- Atlantic Intracoastal Waterway, an inland waterway in the US
- Alice in Wonderland, an 1865 novel with many adaptations
- All-in-Wonder, a computer graphics card
- Avengers: Infinity War, a 2018 superhero film by Marvel Studios
- Arctic Intermediate Water, a water mass
- Ai-Ais Airport (IATA code AIW), in Ai-Ais, Namibia

== See also ==
- Alice in Wonderland (disambiguation)
