= Gaba Corporation =

Japanese English school chain

- Company type: Private (Subsidiary of Bain Capital)
- Industry: Language instruction
- Founded: Tokyo, Japan (July 1995)
- Headquarters: Tokyo
- Key people: Natsuki Tokubuchi, Chairman and Chief Executive Officer;
- Number of employees: 851 contracted instructors, 615 other staff (January 2022)
- Website: www.gaba.co.jp

Gaba Corporation (株式会社 GABA, Kabushikigaisha Gaba) is a chain of eikaiwa schools (English conversation schools) in Japan. The company was founded in July 1995 and is currently headquartered in Shinjuku Ward in Tokyo with learning studios in the Tokyo, Chiba, Yokohama, Nagoya, Osaka, Kyoto, Kobe, and Fukuoka areas. The current president and CEO is Daisuke Terada.

The company provides language lessons on a "one-to-one" (one student and one teacher) basis and using textbook lessons and online (computerized) instructor aids, language and vocabulary drills, and guided conversation topics.

As of July 2019 the company has 50 learning studios. In January it had 615 staff and 851 sub-contracted instructors across Japan. In November 2013 it was reported that Gaba had 21,300 students.

== Meaning of the company name ==
The company name "GABA" is an acronym for "girls, be ambitious; boys, be audacious!". According to a speech given by co-founder Hideki Yoshino, he chose this name because he had a keen interest in physical fitness, and named it after Gamma-Aminobutyric acid, an amino acid used by bodybuilders. Many other large Japanese English conversation schools at the time also had four letter names, such as Nova, GEOS, and Aeon, and giving the school a four letter name would help it fit in.

Gaba describes itself as a "man-to-man eikaiwa". In Japanese, "man-tsū-man" (マンツーマン), a katakana phrase adapted from English, means "one-to-one", referring to the company's one student/one instructor lesson style.

== History ==
=== Founding and early history ===
Gaba was founded in 1995 by Karen and Hideki Yoshino. It was originally a matching service for students and teachers, and lessons were conducted in various locations, such as coffee shops or at teachers' homes. From 2000, the company established schools, referred to as "Learning Studios" where students, referred to as clients, and teachers, referred to as instructors, met, and lessons were conducted.

In March 2004, Chutatsu Aono (青野 仲達) became the president and CEO.

In July 2004, Gaba was purchased by NIF Capital Management, a wholly owned subsidiary of NIF Ventures Co Ltd, in turn a subsidiary of Daiwa Securities. According to the Nikkei Shimbun, the price was several billion yen. It went public in December 2006, and had a valuation of 11.39 billion yen. The majority stockholder was Daiwa Securities, which owned 60.38% of Gaba's stock.

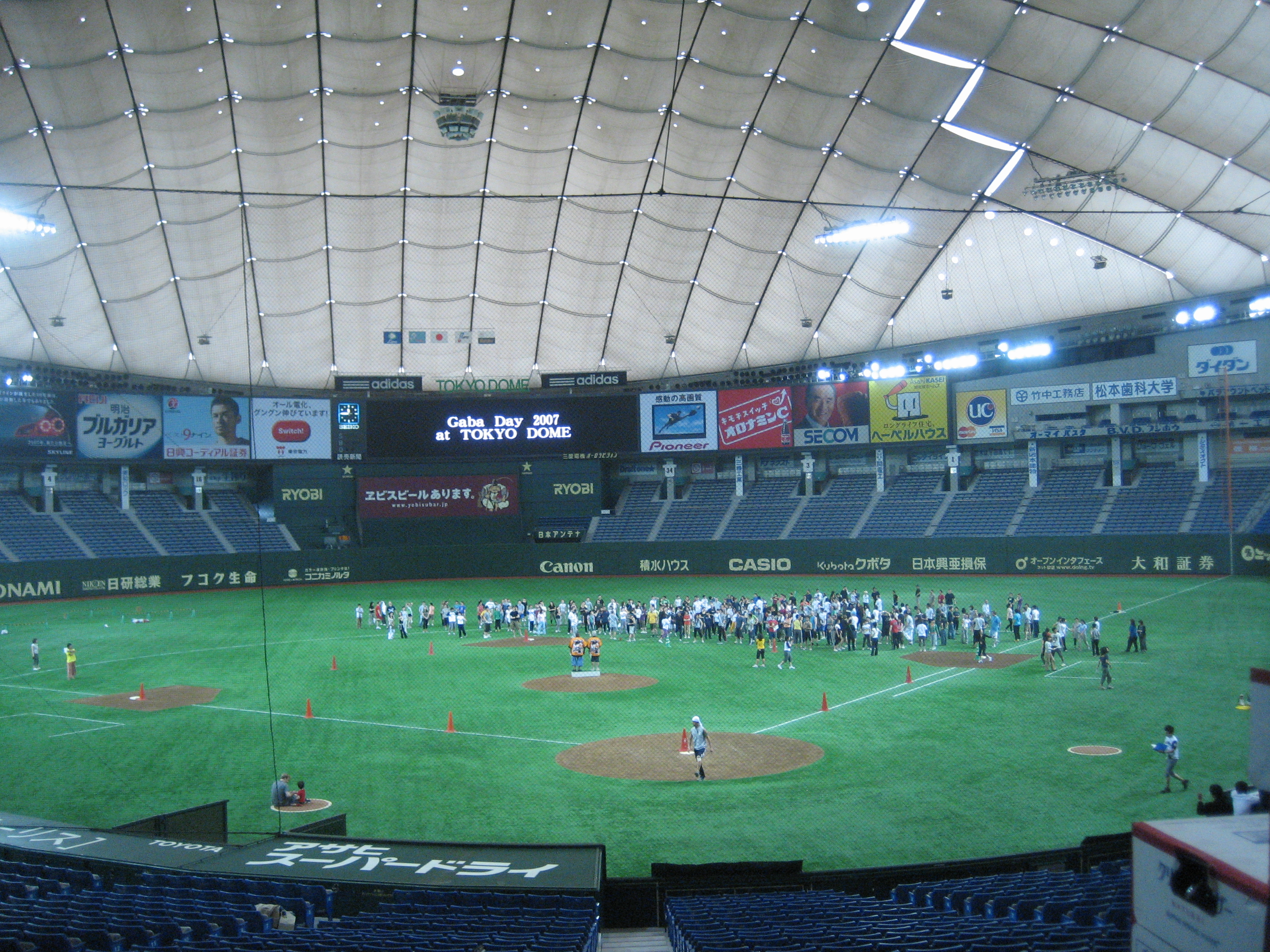
Gaba Day, Tokyo Dome 2007

Due to declining business performance the firm underwent a major transformation at the end of 2008 and the beginning of 2009. In October 2008, Kenji Kamiyama joined the company as COO and Senior Managing Executive Officer. In March 2009 he replaced Chutatsu Aono as president and CEO, and the position of COO was abolished. Kamiyama's focus was to reduce "wasteful expenditure" and to lead a rejuvenation of the profit and loss and balance sheets. During Aono's presidency the firm expanded its number of Learning Studios, but also maintained its headquarters in the expensive GT Tower in Nakameguro, launched the ill-fated Global Stars initiative, and made decisions such as holding its company sports day in May 2007 at Tokyo Dome.

The firm reported having over 18,000 students in September 2010.

On August 5, 2011, it was announced that Nichii Gakkan would purchase Gaba and make it a wholly owned subsidiary. This takeover was effective as of September 29, 2011.

Following Gaba's sale to Nichii Gakkan, effective December 5, 2011 Kenji Kamiyama stepped down as president, chief executive officer and Representative Director of Gaba, and was replaced by Bruce Anderson, and Takayuki Masuda became the vice-president. On March 29, 2012, Masuda succeeded Anderson as president.

In November 2013 it was reported that Gaba had 21,300 students.

President Takayuki Masuda was replaced by Masatoshi Saito on April 1, 2015. He was replaced by Daisuke Terada on December 1, 2017. Terada will be replaced by Makoto Nakamura on April 1, 2020.

=== Stock Price as a publicly listed company ===
Gaba went public on December 5, 2006, and was listed as TYO: 2133 on the Tokyo Stock Exchange. Its initial stock price opened at 255,000 yen per share, but the prices gradually fell from this level to the point where on March 4, 2009, the stock price was closing at 13,900 yen. After that the stock price gradually rose, reaching 162,700 on March 7, 2011. After the Tohoku earthquake it fell, at its lowest point closing at 82,100 on March 15. Subsequently, it rebounded, and after the August 5, 2011 announcement that Nichii Gakkan had launched a take over bid for Gaba paying 200,000 yen per share, the stock price rose to 199,000 on August 15, 2011. The tender offer opened August 8 and expired September 21. As of September 29, 2011 Nichii Gakkan owned 98.88% of Gaba's shares and Daiwa Securities held no voting rights in Gaba.

In 2011 Gaba became a wholly owned subsidiary of Nichii Gakkan. which purchased the company a from Daiwa Securities and other shareholders for 10,100,000,000 yen; on November 30, 2011, Gaba corporation's stock was removed from the Tokyo Stock Exchange . Nichii Gakkan expected Gaba to begin contributing to business results from the second half of fiscal year 2012, with net sales of 4,300,000,000 and an operating income of 400,000,000.

=== Learning Studio history ===
Gaba has added at least one Learning Studio every year from 2000 onward. Generally, they are named after the area they are located in, although some are named after the station they are closest to. The first were opened in March 2000, with the Ikebukuro, Shibuya, Jiyugaoka and Yokohama schools.

On July 13, 2005, Gaba opened a 'next generation' learning studio designed specifically for women in Ginza. It provided VIP "executive booths" that afforded complete privacy for the lesson. English conversation schools often gear marketing campaigns towards women, with strategies the focus on couplings between Japan and the other, represented and embodied by professional/romantic/sexual pairings between western instructors and female Japanese students. The Ginza LS was later moved to Yurakucho, and no longer caters to an exclusively female clientele.

By May 1, 2017, the firm has forty-five Learning Studios in Japan. The vast majority of them are located in the Kanto region (34), with the remaining LSs being in Chubu (2), Kansai (6) and Kyushu (1).

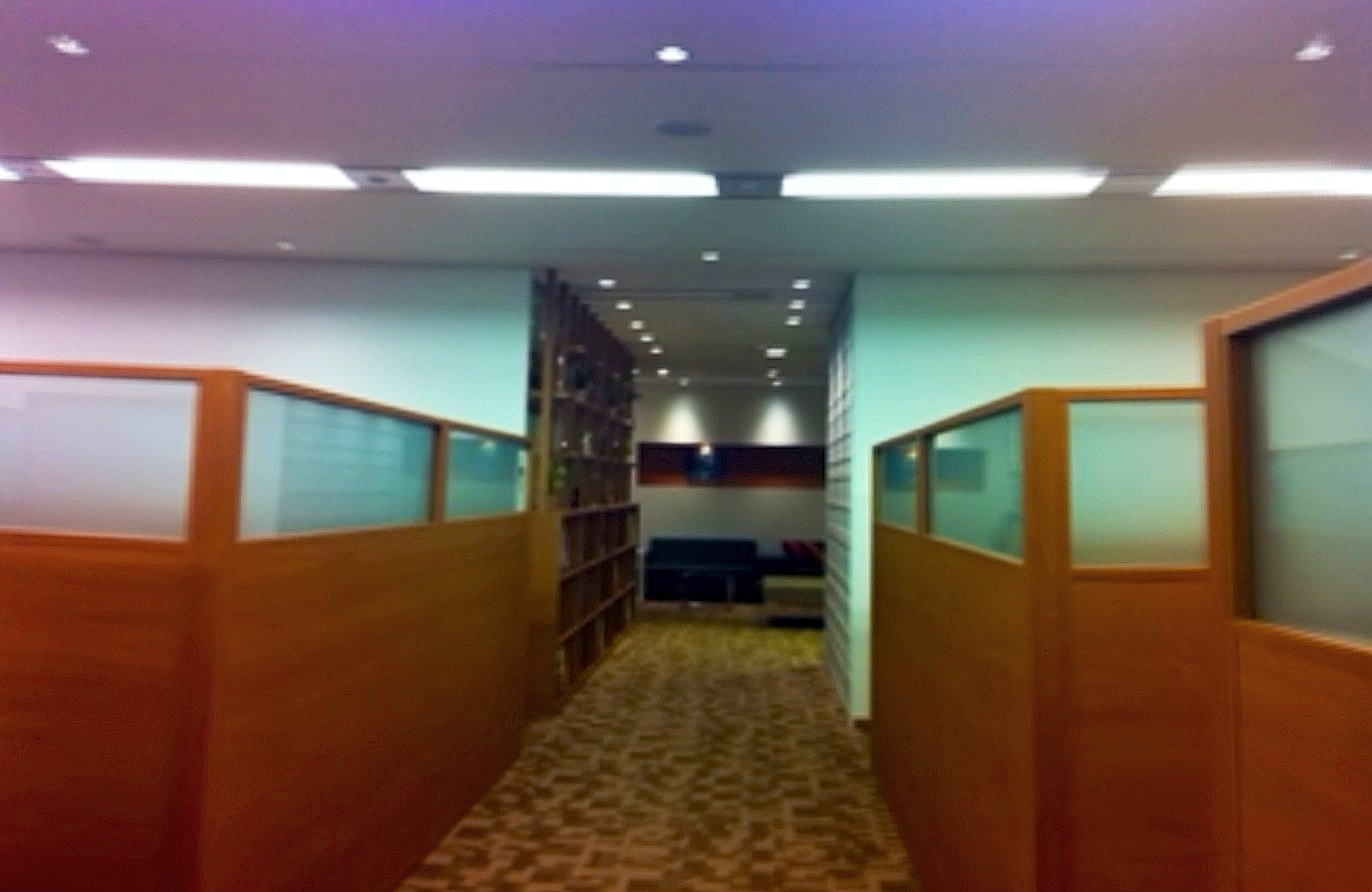
Inside the teaching booth area of the Ikebukuro branch, looking towards reception.

As of May 2020, clients can choose to take their lessons in the studio or online. Instructors continue to teach from their respective Learning Studios. In light of the pandemic, all instructors are required to wear both masks and face shields during offline lessons and masks in online lessons.

In late 2020, Gaba closed 10 of its Learning Studios (Hiroshima LS, Kyoto Ekimae LS, Sendai LS, Tsukuba LS, Sapporo LS, Aobadai LS, Fukuoka-Tenjin LS, Omotesando LS, Roppongi LS, Shimokitazawa LS) and a further 4 studios at the end of 2020 (Akasaka LS, Shinjuku East LS, Shimbashi LS, Tokyo LS).

=== Headquarters ===
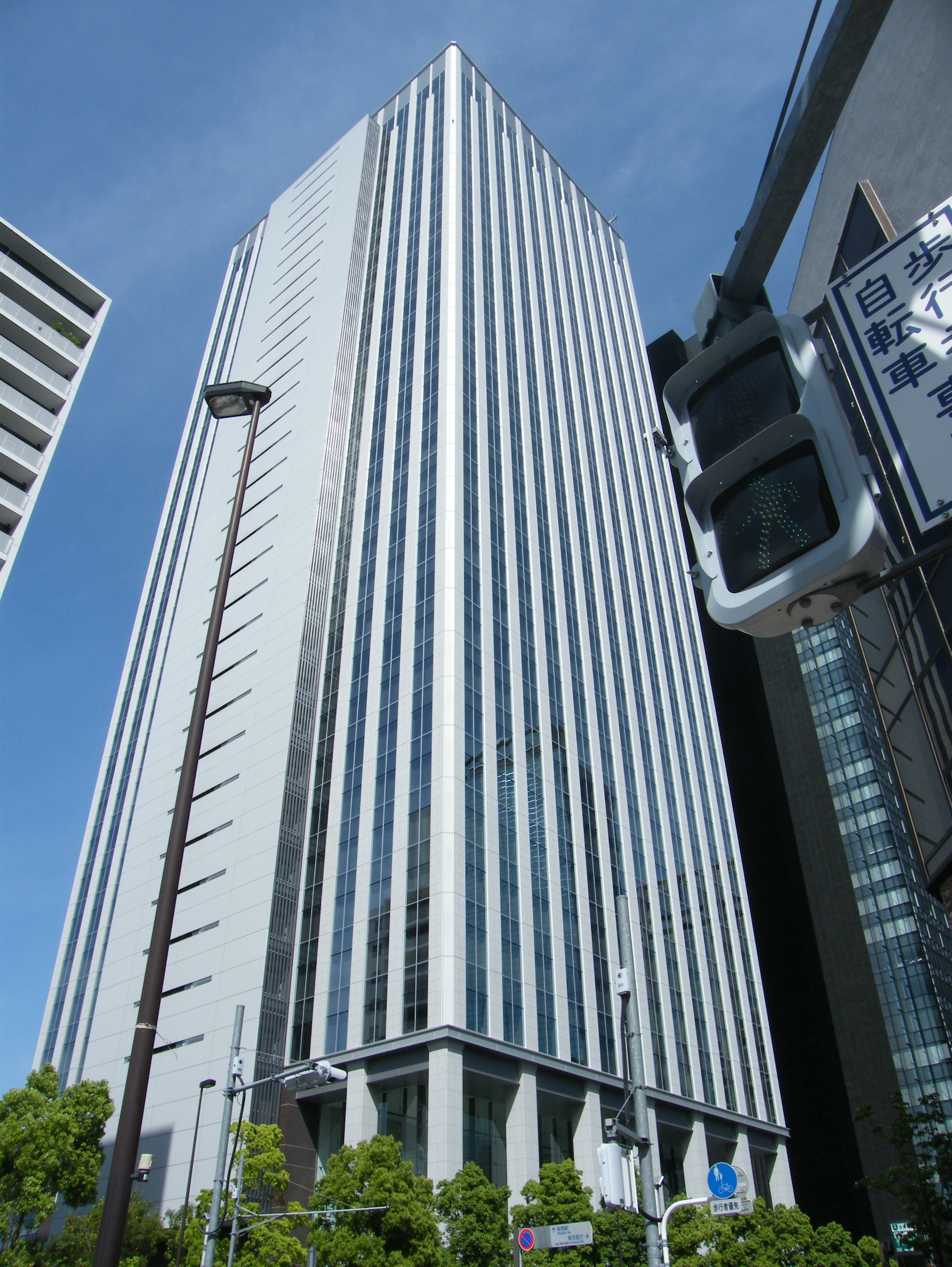
Gaba HQ, Kita-Shinjuku, Shinjuku-ku, Tokyo

Until November 2009, the firm had two buildings, the "Support Centre" in the GT Tower in Nakameguro, effectively the company headquarters and a "Quality Centre", where training was conducted in Ebisu. From November 16, 2009, the Support Centre moved to "Round Cross Moto-Yoyogi" building (now known as "Glass City") in Moto-yoyogi in Shibuya-ku, and on November 24 the "Quality Centre" did so too. After the closure of the Ikebukuro Annex, Gaba's Japanese classes, "Jaba", relocated there also.

On August 11, 2014, Gaba's headquarters moved to the "Shinjuku Front Tower" in Kita-Shinjuku.

=== Global Stars and Gaba Kids ===
In early 2008 Global Stars, a section of the business for teaching one-on-one lessons to children was launched. There were designated "Learning Fields" established in Hiroo and Seijo, as well as "Learning Field-enabled Learning Studios" in Ebisu and Tachikawa. There was not enough demand; the Learning Fields in Hiroo and Seijo were closed in 2009, and Gaba Global Stars was merged into a number of regular leaning studios. From 1 September 2009, Gaba Global Stars was officially re-branded Gaba Kids. It is offered in a number of Learning Studios in the Kanto area and Gaba.

In November 2015 Gaba launched "and Gaba.", a free conversation space in Shibuya, Tokyo.

== Textbooks ==
In February 2002, Gaba launched the Snapshots series of seven textbooks. They were designed to teach grammar points by combining a story about a mixed group of young Japanese and English-speaking characters interacting all over the world. The firm later created online drills for use with the textbooks. In June 2003, a second line of textbooks, Planet, was created. They were designed to teach travel English, with more focus on situations than specific grammar. In July 2004, the Career textbooks were launched. The three books were focused more on situations, in this case business situations, than specific grammar. The firm also used a variety of non-Gaba textbooks for both daily conversation and business English lessons.

From April 2008 the Gaba 13-level system was simplified to a 10-level system with new textbooks. In April 2008 the "Snapshots New" books began to be released. They were much less grammar-focused than the previous Snapshots books. Each level has twenty lessons, with the tenth and twentieth lessons being review lessons. The other eighteen lessons have five sections. First, a picture on the front page that instructors can ask the client to describe. Second, a dialogue section, then three practice sections where the target language for the lesson is tried out. Finally, there is an application section, essentially a role-play.

From October 2008, the Business Advantage textbooks were rolled out. They have the same construction as Snapshots New. The only exception is that from level seven and up, the picture at the start of each lesson is replaced by a newspaper article that the client and instructor discuss at the beginning of the lesson. The new Snapshots New and Business Advantage replaced the older Snapshots series, which are no longer being sold. However, the Planet and Career Gaba texts are still being sold. All non-Gaba textbooks have been phased out.

In February 2011, Gaba introduced the Travel series, replacing the Planet textbooks . In September 2013 the firm introduced the "Starter" textbooks, designed for students at a very low level of English. From June 2014 the firm introduced the "Snapshot Teens" textbooks, designed for teenage students at a low level of English.

In 2016, Gaba updated all of its Pack A textbooks from levels 1 to 7.

In August 2019, Gaba released its "Medical Advantage" series catering to professionals working in the medical field.

== Jaba Japanese lessons ==
In 2008, Gaba started a program to teach Japanese lessons known as Jaba. At first those lessons were held in the Tokyo LS, then in the Ikebukuro Annex, and from November 2009, they relocated to the 8th floor of the new headquarters in Moto-Yoyogi. Lessons are now also taught at various Gaba Learning Studios. The program formerly offered group lessons, but now only offers private lessons.

== Lesson purchase system ==
Gaba clients purchase blocks of lessons when they join the company and when they renew their contract. The company then places these funds into an escrow account, and allocates "lesson points" to the clients. Clients spend these lesson points, and as this occurs the funds are transferred from the escrow account to Gaba's regular accounts.

The cost to students for Gaba lessons is between 5000 and 7000 yen per lesson, depending on the course they purchase. According to an interview with Reuters, Gaba students pay about 50,000 yen per month, higher than the 36,500 average allowance that company employees receive from their employers for such training.

== Employment system ==
The firm has separate employment systems for staff and for instructors.

=== Staff employment system ===
Gaba employs Japanese staff referred to as "counselors" in the Learning Studios. Some of these are employed on a part-time basis, receiving unemployment insurance and transportation pay but no other benefits. Others are employed on a full-time basis and receive full employment benefits. Most other Gaba staff are also employed on a full-time basis with the standard benefits of employment.

=== Instructor employment system ===
Gaba instructors are not currently employees, but rather are 'itaku', effectively independent contractors. They have six month contracts, and are paid per lesson. Instructors used to have flexibility in choosing their schedule until July 2019, but Gaba ultimately choose when instructors can work. Gaba instructors receive an incentive for teaching a certain amount of lessons each month.

As Gaba instructors work under a contract, many benefits provided to salaried workers in Japan are not available. For example, they do not receive any travel allowance, sick leave, or holiday pay, and Gaba does not pay for part of their pension, health insurance, or unemployment insurance. They therefore do not pay payroll taxes, which normally take a significant chunk out of Japanese salaried workers' paychecks.

Similarly to many other English conversation schools in Japan, Gaba recruits extensively outside Japan. It has held recruiting events in Canada, Australia, England, Ireland, the US, Taiwan, South Korea, Hong Kong in August, and Singapore.

== Industrial action ==
On September 6, 2007, a union of Gaba's instructors was formed as part of the Osaka-based General Union, and has members in different areas of the firm. The General Union belongs to the National Union of General Workers (NUGW), which is a member of the National Trade Union Council (Zenrokyo).

Union representatives had many discussions with the company around 2007. In April 2008, Gaba raised its lesson rate; the General Union has long claimed that these changes were due to union pressure, but Gaba has maintained that the changes were being discussed in 2006, before the union came to Gaba, and were not related to union pressure. The union subsequently took an unfair labor practice case through the Osaka Labor Relations Commission claiming that Gaba had not negotiated in good faith, and also to have instructors recognized as employees, not independent gyomu-itaku (sub-contractors) .

The case ran from July 2008 to August 2009. The ruling found that Gaba had negotiated in good faith with the union, but also implied that Gaba's instructor contracting system had elements of labor and that Gaba instructors had the right to organize 'as employees'. This language was interpreted by the Union as a decision on the status of instructors, and through their web page declared that Gaba instructors are not itaku but employees under the trade union law. This did not immediately change the employment situation for Gaba instructors but the union said it would use this to win standard employment benefits (paid leave, unemployment insurance, health insurance, etc.) which Gaba does not currently give to instructors under their itaku contracts.

Gaba was dissatisfied with this interpretation, and appealed to the Central Labor Commission in Tokyo. On October 28, 2010, the Central Labor Commission ruled that the question should be decided by a lower court (the Osaka Labor Committee). After multiple appeals and negotiations with the union, the company eventually recognized the rights of its instructors under trade union law.

In August 2010, union members lodged applications with the Shibuya Hello Work office to be enrolled in unemployment insurance. The applications were eventually withdrawn by the GU as part of an agreement signed with Gaba. As of January 2016, Gaba instructors are not enrolled in unemployment insurance.

On October 4, 2010, the General Union made an official complaint to the Securities and Exchange Surveillance Commission, part of the Financial Services Agency, over compliance issues based on Gaba stating in its report for the 2009 financial year that there was no union at the company, and that labor relations were "smooth and harmonious", and also for failing to mention the Osaka Labor Commission case and the subsequent appeal. The company sued the General Union for libel, over an article on the union webpage dealing with Gaba's compliance. The company's suit was dismissed in November 2011. After negotiations with the union Gaba agreed not to appeal their loss.

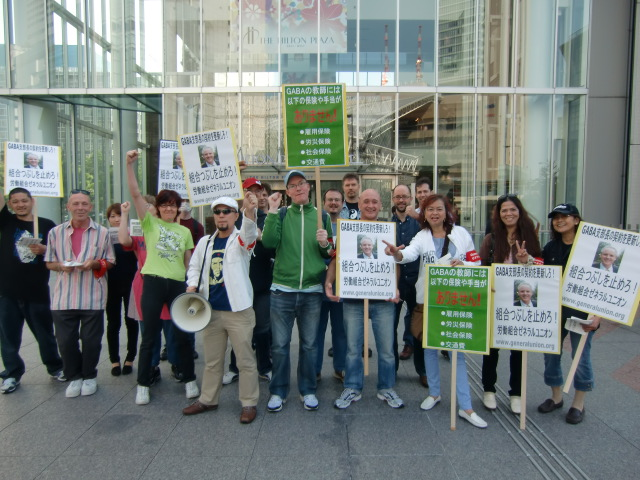
General Union demonstration at Umeda Learning Studio, Osaka

After over 8 years as a Gaba instructor, Gaba non-renewed the contract of Francis Strange, the chair of the Gaba branch of the General Union. The union viewed this as union busting, and in October the union demonstrated and leafleted Learning Studios in Osaka and Tokyo, and negotiated with Gaba and new owner Nichii Gakkan in an effort to reverse the non-renewal. After negotiations Gaba agreed to rehire Strange.

In April 2012 Gaba and the General Union signed an agreement in which both sides withdrew their pending cases in the courts and government bureaucracy. Gaba agreed to negotiate in good faith on the issue of employment status and benefits for instructors. After signing the agreement to negotiate, the union and the company commenced negotiations on conditions on May 28, 2012, and the negotiations are ongoing as of 2016.

=== Morning peak lesson pay increase ===
The General Union and company subsequently signed a collective agreement that from May 2013 all instructors working the first three weekday morning peak time lessons (the F-shift) would receive an additional 200 yen for every lesson taught. The agreement was officially signed and dated on June 17, 2013. and the first payday including the incentive was June 25, 2013. For instructors on the lowest pay rate (around 50% of the workforce) this meant a 13.3% pay increase for those lessons.

On October 4, 2013, the General Union and Gaba Corporation signed a grievance procedure agreement. This legally requires the company to respond to workplace grievances related to individual instructors in a fair and prompt manner.

=== Dealing with Sexual Harassment from Clients ===
From 2013 the General Union raised a number of incidents where Gaba clients had sexually harassed instructors. In response to this, the company changed their policy to make it easier for instructors to block students who behaved inappropriately and introduced a standardised form for ISLs to report harassment from clients to Gaba HQ.

In 2014 the Gaba Branch of the union appointed sexual harassment officers for instructors to speak to about incidents at work.

In 2015 Gaba staff deleted information on the system about clients who had harassed female instructors. An instructor brought up the issue with the company several times as new instructors were left with no warning, and no knowledge that they were in their rights to have the student blocked. No action were taken. Information about this were finally entered in the system by the instructor so female instructors would be aware and could prepare themselves. The comments were repeatedly deleted and the instructor was given a written warning by the company and told not to do it again. The union protested this. Later in 2015 an instructor who warned a new instructor about a client who had harassed female instructors in the past was disciplined by the company, which the union also protested.

== Sexual harassment allegations ==
Gaba teachers complained in 2014 that company management has not acted appropriately or with sufficient support when they have been sexually harassed by students at work.

== See also ==
- Nichii Gakkan
- Coco Juku
