= Japanese labour law =

Japanese labour law is the system of labour law operating in Japan.

== Contract and rights ==
The scope of Japanese labour law is defined by the Japanese Civil Code. Article 622 defines contracts of employment, article 632 defines a contract for work, and article 643 defines a contract for mandate. The parties are free to decide the functional nature of their contract, but labour rights apply regardless of the label in the contract. Courts use a subordination test to determine whether someone is an employee or is self-employed.

=== Contract of employment ===
Under the Civil Code, a contract in which one person performs services for another with compensation may be construed as any one of the following:

- an employment agreement (雇用契約, koyō keiyaku) where the object is the completion of labour under the employing party's direction.
- an independent contractor agreement (請負契約, ukeoi keiyaku) where the object is the completion of a specific task.
- a mandate agreement (委任契約, inin keiyaku) where, similar to power of attorney in common law countries, one party performs designated tasks on the other party's behalf. These tasks are usually legal acts but may be non-legal acts, in which case, the agreement is referred to as a quasi-mandate (準委任, jun-inin).

Employment agreements are regulated by the Civil Code and by the Labor Standards Act of 1947 (労働基準法, Rōdō-kijun-hō). (The JETRO reference below covers this subject.) Some general guidelines follow. Some items apply only to companies with ten or more employees.

Conditions of employment must be clearly set out in the employment agreement or in supplementary rules which are provided to the employee.

=== Pay ===
Japan has minimum wage laws: the actual amount is based upon the local cost of living and therefore varies from region to region (see links below).

Pay must generally be provided in full, in cash, and paid directly to the employee on or by a specified day of the month (as per the contract).

Cash payments are usually made by electronic funds transfer. The maximum pay period is one month, which is the standard pay period throughout Japan, although bonuses and other supplemental payments such as commuter allowance may be paid at longer intervals.

Salaries at Japanese companies are based on seniority, and are adjusted for the needs of employees, such as if they have a family and children. Companies also generally reimburse for public transportation.

=== Working time ===
Since 1987, Japan has adopted the principle of a 40-hour week. If people work over eight hours per day, 40 hours per week, or on holidays (and one "weekend" day a week), or at late night (10pm to 5am), they are entitled to overtime pay. Under the Labor Standards Act of 1947 article 37, this is 25% of pay, or 35% on holidays. Since 2010, a rate of 50% overtime pay applies for people working over 60 hours a week. However, although overtime pay is required by law, Japanese companies before 1990 were known to take employees to court over employees' requests for overtime or other legitimate compensation. Also, collective agreements may extend the normal work week.

If an employee works six to eight hours in a day, they are entitled to a 45-minute break. If an employee works eight hours in a day, they are entitled to a one-hour break.

The Labor Standards Act of 1947 gives the right to paid annual leave based on an employee's seniority. Since 1988, employees have the right to ten days of annual leave after the employee's first 6 months of service. The minimum amount of annual leave increases each year thereafter following a fixed schedule (as per the contract), usually up to twenty working days a year. An employee is entitled to one holiday per week unless they otherwise receive four or more holidays within every period of four weeks.

Several forms of unpaid leave are also provided by law, including maternity leave, child care leave, family care leave and nursing leave.

=== Work Style Reform Law ===
The "Work Style Reform Law" was passed on June 29, 2018, by the Abe government. The reform bills are also referred to as "The Revolution In The Way [People] Work" (働き方改革) and is effective April 2019 (dates vary according to amendment and size of employer), with violation subject to fines. The stated purpose includes restricting overtime hours, improving treatment of non-regular (such as temporary and part-time) workers and, more broadly, upping productivity of the Japanese economy.

The bill consists of three main pillars: 1) an overtime cap of 100 hours a month, 2) "equal pay for equal work" to improve treatment of non-regular employees, and 3) an exemption for "high-level" professionals from the overtime cap referred to in the first pillar.

The overtime element introduces a legal cap on overtime to a current landscape with unlimited overtime hours. The 100 hours cap (and 720 hours/year) is the limit allowed for busier months, with the general upper limit set at 45 hours per month (360 hours/year). The Health, Labor and Welfare Ministry defines the threshold for karōshi as greater than 80 hours of overtime a month. The cap is effective April 2019 for large companies and April 2020 for small and medium-sized companies.

"Equal pay for equal work" entails equal pay for non-regular workers that engage in the same scope of work. Put another way, equal treatment of workers—without discrimination on employment status. Question towards the lack of specificity of this portion of the law has been raised, and it is expected that the administration will provide further specifications. This amendment is effective April 2020 for large companies and April 2021 for small and medium-sized companies.

The "high-level" professionals who qualify for exemption from the overtime cap are those whose work require highly specific knowledge (such as financial traders, consultants, and product developers; professions are yet to be specified) and earn annual incomes greater than JPY 10.75 million ($97,500). A provision allowing "high-level" professionals to give up exemption status if they desired was added, following criticism from opposition that this exemption could further exacerbate the overwork culture. This amendment is effective April 2019.

Public reaction has been generally positive towards the overtime and equal pay amendments, though divided on the exemption amendment which has been especially controversial. Those in favor argue for its push towards productivity, whereas the opposition argue no pay for overtime hours could put workers at greater risk—politician Yukio Edano goes so far as calling it "The Permitting Death By Overwork (Karoshi) Legislation (過労死容認法案)".

Karōshi and reforms on labour policy in Japan were further brought into urgent attention following the suicide of 24-year-old Matsuri Takahashi on Christmas Day in 2015. Takahashi was an employee at Dentsu, Japan's leading advertising agency, and worked more than 100 hours overtime in the months prior to her death—her death was ruled as karōshi.

== Participation ==
Under the Japanese Constitution article 28 everyone has the right to unionise and to collectively bargain. Under the Trade Union Act of 1949 article 7(2) an employer's refusal to bargain with a union in good faith, without a good reason, is an unfair labour practice. The duty to bargain in good faith extends to managerial issues affecting employment conditions.

Under the Trade Union Act of 1949 article 18, a Ministerial order may extend the provisions of a collective agreement if both employers and a union request it to a defined area or sector. However, in practice this is used very little. Under the Trade Union Act of 1949 article 7(1) a closed shop agreement is permitted with majority unions.

Japan has, unlike the majority of OECD countries, no right of workers to vote for members of a company board of directors. There is no statutory right to elect a work council with binding rights, although companies use employee consultative committees widely. If there is no majority recognised union, employee committees may make agreements with the same effect as collective agreements. Under Trade Union Act of 1949 article 38(4) the use of health and safety committees is discretionary.

The Japanese Constitution article 28 contains the basic right to strike, or take collective action in defence of workers' interests. However, there is no protection for unofficial strikes without a union's endorsement, political strikes, and secondary action has been suppressed since 1975 case law. "Defensive" lock-outs aimed to restore "equilibrium" between the collective parties are permitted. There is also a requirement to notify an employer 10 days in advance before a strike in "essential" services under the Labour Relations Adjustment Act, article 37(1). A strike in breach of a peace obligation is not in itself unlawful and is not a ground for dismissal. Dismissal for taking part in a lawful strike is not permitted but there is no restriction on hiring replacements during a strike.

== Equality ==
=== Discrimination ===
Article 4 of the Labour Standards Act of 1947 prohibits discrimination in pay based on gender: "An employer shall not engage in discriminatory treatment of a woman as compared with a man with respect to wages by reason of the worker being a woman."

Subsequent legislation has also banned forms of disparate treatment which were previously used to skirt this stipulation. For instance, women must be afforded the same hiring, job training, promotion opportunities and retirement plans as men. Despite the law, it is reported that the disparity in pay and in promotion between men and women is one of the highest of the so-called advanced countries.

Article 3 of the Labour Standards Act of 1947 prohibits ethnic, national and religious discrimination by employers in regards to work conditions: "An employer shall not engage in discriminatory treatment with respect to wages, working hours or other working conditions by reason of the nationality, creed or social status of any worker ..."

Article 7 of the Trade Union Act of 1949 prohibits discrimination against people who join or attempt to join a union, or who participate in union activities.

=== Atypical workers ===
Since 2008, part-time workers have a right to equal treatment with full-time workers if they have contracts for indefinite duration. If part-time workers have a fixed-term contract, there is no right to equal treatment. Case law has stated that different redundancy payments between regular workers and others are potentially justifiable. Fixed-term contracts are not restricted, and there is no right to equal treatment with permanent workers. The Labour Standards Act of 1947 article 14 states a fixed-term contract's maximum duration is three years, but there is no limit on renewals or any reason required. Case law suggests renewals are possible. However, since 2013, a fixed-term contract would convert into a permanent contract after five years if the employee submits a request, unless renewal could be regarded as socially acceptable.

Until the Worker Dispatching Act of 1986, agency work was strictly controlled and limited to a number of sectors. The rules were liberalised in 1996 and 1999 and then restrictions were removed in 2004. Agency workers have no right to equal treatment with directly employed staff.

== Job security ==
A fixed-term employment contract is generally limited to one year (there are some exceptions). For tenured staff, the term is not specified (but of course retirement age is usually stated). If a contract is a full-year contract, and has been renewed at least once, then compensation—typically one month's pay for each year worked—is often negotiated.

Under the Labour Standards Act of 1947 article 20, an employer must usually give 30 days' notice before dismissal, or pay in lieu of notice. An employee is permitted to resign at any time (usually two weeks' notice is required).

An employer must only dismiss an employee for rational, reasonable, and socially acceptable reason. There is no qualifying period for this right. The main criterion for a fair dismissal is that it follows a fair procedure, since case law from 1970. Fair reasons for dismissal are defined by the Labour Contracts Act 2008. However, reinstatement is rare and compensation is the normal remedy under the Japanese Civil Code, articles 546 and 709.

Dismissal is specifically prohibited during:

- Maternity leave of a female employee, and for 30 days afterward.
- Hospitalisation of an employee following job-related illness or injury, and for 30 days afterward.

An employee who plans to contest dismissal should say so, demand that the reason be provided in writing, and should not accept the thirty days' pay in lieu of notice—as this may be construed as accepting dismissal.

There are no legal rights to a redundancy payment, and there is no rule about priority in redundancy based on seniority.

The Employment Insurance Act of 1974 gives workers who have lost their jobs benefits.

== See also ==
- Religious freedom in Japan
- Law of Japan: Employment law
- Family law in Japan
- JNR dismissal lawsuit (1987)
- Prada gender discrimination case (2012)
- Equal Employment Opportunity Law (Japan)

General:

- Human rights in Japan
- Japanese work environment
- Labour insurance (Japan)
- Labor market of Japan
- Labor unions in Japan
- Haken (employment)
- Unfair labor practice (Japan)

International:

- UK labour law
- German labour law
- Indian labor law
- European labour law
- US labor law
