= Workers Compensation Act 1987 =

Australian statute

In New South Wales (NSW), Australia workers compensation is governed by the Workers Compensation Act 1987. It was introduced to replace the Workers Compensation Act 1926. Overseen by WorkCover, the Act outlines the compensation and rehabilitation of workers in respect to work related injuries. The Act consists of 10 parts (2 of which have been repealed) which cover the issues of compensation liability and benefits, uninsured liabilities, common law remedies, insurance and protection of injured workers from dismissal.
