= Labour insurance (Japan) =

Government welfare programs in Japan

Labour insurance (労働保険, roudou hoken) is a term for two systems of government welfare programs employed in Japan: Unemployment insurance (雇用保険, koyou hoken) and Workers' accident compensation insurance (労働者災害補償保険, rousai hoken). Unemployment insurance is managed by Hello Work; and worker's accident compensation insurance is managed by the Labour Standards Office.
