= Nichii Gakkan =

- Type: Public
- Traded as: TYO: 9792
- Industry: Medical services
- Founded: Tokyo, Japan (1968)
- Headquarters: 2-9 Kanda-Surugadai, Chiyoda Ward, Tokyo 101-8688, Japan
- Key people: Akihiko Terada, deceased founder; Koichi Terada, Director; Kazuyoshi Yaji, Vice President, Representative Director
- Number of employees: 20,393 (Employees) 74,701 (Sub-contract Employees)
- Website: www.nichiigakkan.co.jp/

Nichii Gakkan (株式会社 ニチイ学館, Kabushiki Kaisha Nichii Gakkan) is a medical services company in Japan. The company was founded in 1968 by Akihiko Terada and is headquartered in Chiyoda Ward in Tokyo. Founder Akihiko Terada has been chairman and representative director since May 2010 and from October 1, 2014, he also became president of the company once again, replacing Masatoshi Saito, who had been president since April 2011. Akihiko Terada died on September 28, 2019.

== History ==
Nichii Gakkan was founded in 1968 as a medical office administration services business. It was incorporated in 1973 and gradually expanded its range of businesses. In 1999 it was listed on the Tokyo stock exchange, and in 2007 the various brand names were standardized to Nichii.

== Stock price ==
In recent times Nichii Gakkan's stock price has fluctuated substantially. Its most recent high was 1124 yen on April 13, 2012. Since that date it has fallen to close at 877 yen on May 30, 2014.

== Dividends ==
Nichii Gakkan pays dividends to shareholders twice a year. In 2010 it was 6 yen per share, in 2011 it was 7 yen, In 2012 it was 8 yen. In 2013 a dividend of 9 yen was paid, and in 2014 10 yen was paid.

== Director and auditor bonuses ==
Nichii Gakkan pays a bonus to directors and auditors. In 2010 this totalled 34,000,000 yen, in 2011 this was 35,100,000 yen, in 2012 it was 36,500,000 yen. In 2013 the amount rose to 39,700,000 yen. In 2013 it totalled 39,700,000 yen, with 36,000,000 being divided among 12 directors and 2,700,000 being divided among three auditors.

== Company structure ==
As of March 2014 the Nichii Group consisted of Nichii Gakkan Company, 25 subsidiaries and two affiliates.

Nichii Gakkan has four principal business areas:

- Medical - Medical office administration total services, research and analysis services, PFI.
  - Principal companies: Nichii Gakkan Company, NIhon Support Service Co., Ltd
- Healthcare - At-home care services, facility care services, livelihood support services.
  - Principal companies: Nichii Gakkan Company, Nichii Carenet Co., Ltd, Nihon Support Service Co., Ltd, Nichii Care Palace Co., Ltd.
- Education - Home helper training, medical office administration education, others.
  - Principal companies: Nichii Gakkan Company, Gaba Corporation, SELC Australia Pty Ltd.
- Other - Information processing, storing and delivery of goods, publishing and sale of books, production and sale of flowers, plants and seedlings, leasing, etc.
  - Principal companies: Nihon Support Service Co., Ltd, Tokyo Marunouchi Publishing Co., Ltd, Nichii Green Farm Co., Ltd, Nihon Credit Lease Corp.

== Management principles ==
Nichii Gakkan has a "Target five stars" management strategy aiming to make the company the industry leader in:

- Net sales
- Earnings
- Product Strength
- Employee compensation
- Corporate ethics

== Moves into China ==
Nichii Gakkan moved into China, with group wholesaler of long-term care products and welfare equipment Nichii Carenet Company establishing Riyi Fuli Qiju Maoyi (Shanghai) Co., Ltd., as a locally incorporated entity in February 2012.

== Moves into the language teaching market ==
On August 5, 2011, it was announced that Nichii Gakkan would add to its education business area by purchasing the eikaiwa Gaba Corporation, mostly delivering one-on-one lessons at with 36 locations across Japan, for $127 million and making it a wholly owned subsidiary. This takeover was effective as of September 29, 2011. As of June 2015 Gaba Corporation has 41 locations across Japan.

In April 2012 Nichii Gakkan founded Coco Juku, an English conversation school primarily focused on group lessons. As of June 2015 it has 80 locations across Japan.

Nichii Gakkan has also made the Sydney English Language Centre (SELC Pty Ltd), a subsidiary, and plans to expand its operations into North America and Europe. SELC currently has branches in Australia, Canada, and the Philippines.

== See also ==
- Akihiko Terada
- Takayuki Masuda
- Masatoshi Saito
- Gaba Corporation
- Coco Juku
