= Ministry of Health, Labour and Welfare =

Government ministry of Japan

Coordinates: 35.673°N 139.753°E

- 厚生労働省; Kōsei-rōdō-shō

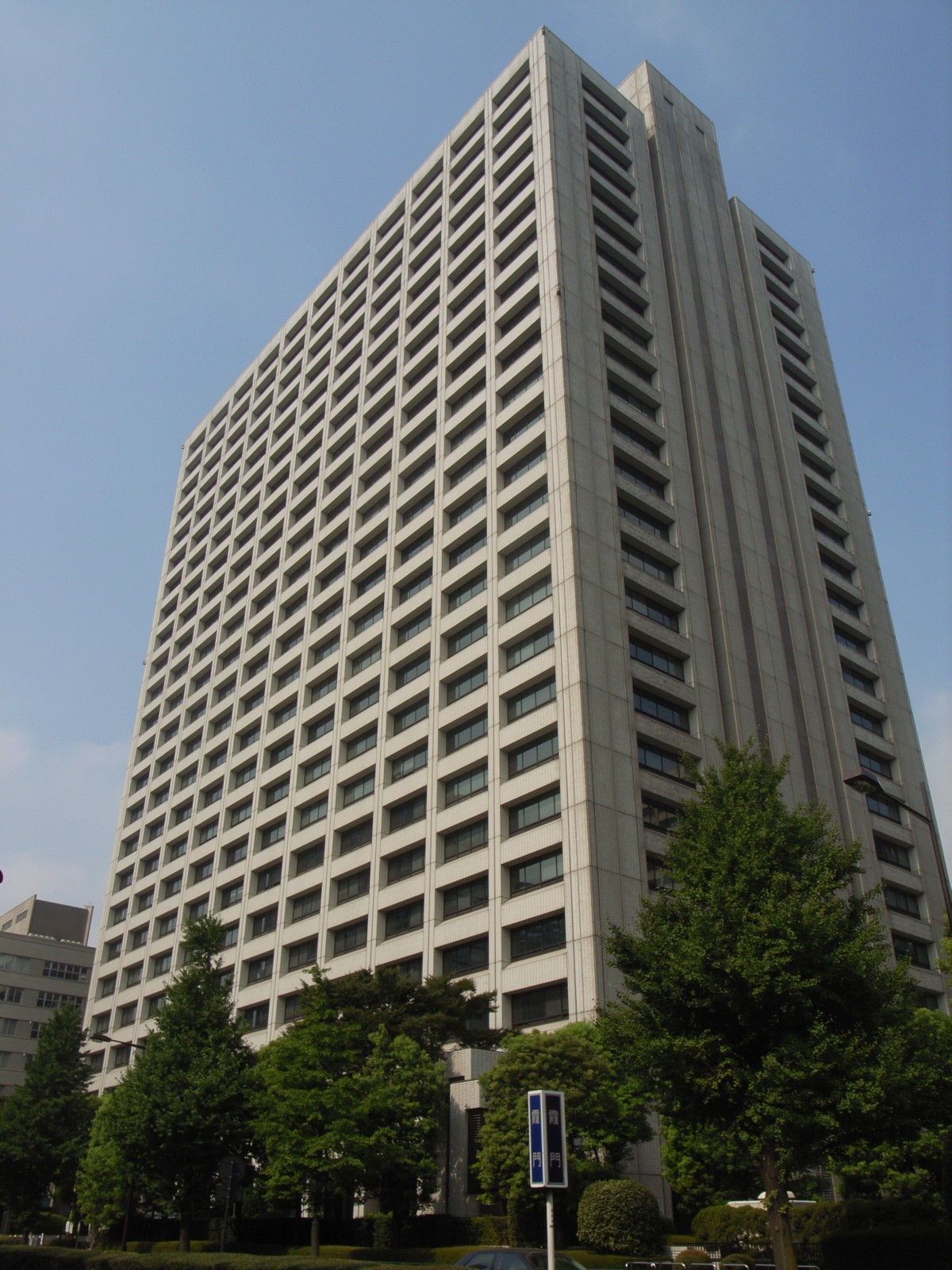

Agency overview
- Formed: 2001
- Preceding agencies: Ministry of Health and Welfare (厚生省, Kōsei-shō); Ministry of Labour (労働省, Rōdō-shō)
- Jurisdiction: Government of Japan
- Headquarters: 1-2-2 Kasumigaseki, Chiyoda-ku, Tokyo, 100-8916 Japan
- Ministers responsible: Kenichiro Ueno, Minister; Hirobumi Niki, State Minister; Yasumasa Nagasaka, State Minister
- Website: mhlw.go.jp/english

The Ministry of Health, Labour and Welfare (厚生労働省, Kōsei-rōdō-shō; lit. 'Ministry of Health and Labour'; MHLW) is a cabinet-level ministry of the Japanese government. It is commonly known as Kōrō-shō (厚労省) in Japan. The ministry provides services on health, labour and welfare.

The Minister of Health, Labour and Welfare is a member of the Cabinet and is chosen by the Prime Minister, typically from among members of the Diet.

== History ==
It was formed with the merger of the former Ministry of Health and Welfare or Kōsei-shō (厚生省) and the Ministry of Labour or Rōdō-shō (労働省) in January 2001.

== Organization ==
The ministry contains the following sections as of 2019:

- The Minister's Secretariat (including the Statistics and Information Department)
- The Health Policy Bureau
- The Health Service Bureau
- Pharmaceutical and Food Safety Bureau (including the Food Safety Department)
- The Labour Standards Bureau (including the Industrial Safety and Health Department, Workers Compensation Department, and Workers' Life Department)
- The Employment Security Bureau (including the Employment Measures for the Elderly and Persons with Disabilities Department)
- The Human Resources Development Bureau
- The Equal Employment, Children and Families Bureau
- The Social Welfare and War Victims' Relief Bureau (including the Department of Health and Welfare for People with Disabilities)
- The Health and Welfare Bureau for the Elderly
- The Health Insurance Bureau
- The Pension Bureau
- The Director-General for Policy Planning and Evaluation
- Affiliated research institutions (6 research institutes, 218 national hospitals, 13 quarantine stations, and 3 Social Welfare Facilities)
- Councils (Social Security Council, Health Sciences Council, Labour Policy Council, Medical Ethics Council, Pharmaceutical Affairs and Food Sanitation Council, Evaluation Committee for Independent Administrative institutions, Central Minimum Wages Council, Labour Insurance Appeal Committee, Central Social Insurance Medical Council, Examination Committee of Social Insurance, Examination Committee for Certification of Sickness and Disability, Examination Committee for Relief Assistances)
- Regional Bureaus (8 Regional Bureaus of Health and Welfare and 47 Prefectural Labour Bureaus)
  - Narcotics Control Department
- External Bureaus (Japan Pension Service, Central Labour Relations Commission)

== Investigations ==
=== Highway tour bus companies ===
After a fatal bus accident on April 29, 2012, where a bus bound for Tokyo Disneyland crashed in Gunma Prefecture killing seven and injuring 39 others, the ministry launched an investigation into highway bus companies. Investigations were carried out at a total of 339 businesses. It was discovered that 95.6% (324 firms) were violating the Labor Standards Law and the Industrial Safety and Health Law. 219 businesses (64.6%) broke the law by having their drivers work behind the wheel more than the legal maximum of eight hours a day and 40 hours a week, or longer than what was agreed upon with their labour union. It also found 37 businesses, (10.9%), did not provide "at least one day off a week," which the law obliges employers to give their drivers. Also, it found that 260 (76.6%) did not observe standards involving bus driver working hours, which prohibit them from working more than 16 hours a day in combined driving and office time. The ministry said it took "corrective measures" with those who violated the laws.

== Criticism ==
Published ministry employee and outspoken critic Moriyo Kimura states that the ministry's medical officers (ikei gikan) are "corrupt and self-serving." Kimura states that the officers, who number 250, have little experience and see no patients nor practice medicine after being hired by the ministry. Thus, says Kimura, Japan's public health policies lag behind other developed countries, by "decades".

== See also ==
- European Medicines Agency
- U.S. Department of Health and Human Services
