= Uninsured employer =

Uninsured employer in the United States is a term to identify an employer of workers under circumstances where there is no form of insurance in place to provide certain benefits to those workers. More specifically, it is a term used in workers’ compensation law to identify an employer who does not have some form of worker's compensation insurance or self-insurance coverage in effect at the time of, or during the time of, a claimed injury.

All States require that employers provide injury benefits coverage to their employees. These benefits are called workers’ compensation insurance coverage. This kind of coverage is to be distinguished from liability coverage, which covers the premises and the owner/occupier of the space from claims made by non-employees for injuries on the premises. It is also to be distinguished from health insurance, which covers only medical bills for non-work incurred conditions.

Protection can be accomplished through a traditional insurance policy for workers’ compensation coverage. Coverage can also be accomplished by way of compliance with various State self-insurance laws (usually reserved for larger employers) requiring substantial bonding and self-funding. For example, public agencies are usually permissibly self-insured.

When the employer has no specific insurance, or arrangement for the provision of workers’ compensation benefits to injured employees, the employer is then referred to as an uninsured employer.

== Criminal law as per state ==
This status is a highly negative one in most States and often deemed a crime under State law. When there are no funds available to cover the benefits, and resulting bills for such benefits, the State usually steps in and provides the funding; hence the State's interest in making the failure to have coverage both legally and financially painful. Most often this involves complete repayment to the State, fines, penalties, business closure, and the loss of legal defenses. The seriousness of the status by the uninsured employer is often underestimated due to unfamiliarity with the system and the belief that, like automobile uninsured motorist law, a quick settlement can be made by the uninsured for a modest amount to end the process. This is contrary to State law and recent studies in California have shown that for 2009 average claim cost is upwards of $60,000 and continually rising.

== State-based uninsured employers fund ==
Most often US states set aside fund to pay claims to injured workers under certain circumstances. Below are some examples:

=== California Uninsured Employers Fund ===
Two special funds pay claims to injured workers under certain circumstances.

- Claims are paid from the Uninsured Employers Benefits Trust Fund (UEBTF) when illegally uninsured employers fail to pay workers' compensation benefits awarded to their injured employees by the Workers' Compensation Appeals Board. The UEBTF is funded by a small tax on every Workers' Compensation policy that is written, and the UEBTF typically places liens on assets of the uninsured employers until the debt is repaid. To do so, a Special Notice of Lawsuit must be properly served upon the uninsured employer to give the UEBTF legal jurisdiction for the recovery.
- The Subsequent Injuries Benefits Trust Fund (SIBTF) is a source of additional compensation to injured workers who already had a disability or impairment at the time of injury. For benefits to be paid from the SIBTF, the combined effect of the injury and the previous disability or impairment must result in a permanent disability of at least 70 percent. The fund enables employers to hire disabled workers without fear of being held liable for the effects of previous disabilities or impairments. SIBTF benefit checks are issued to injured workers by the SIBTF Claims Unit after benefits are awarded by the Workers’ Compensation Appeals Board.

=== New York Uninsured Employers Fund ===
- If an employee is hurt when there is no workers' compensation policy in effect and that employee chooses to file a workers' compensation claim, the employer will be liable for the actual cost of medical care and compensation payments, in addition to penalties. If a corporation has failed to secure workers' compensation coverage, the president, secretary and treasurer of a corporation are personally liable for the medical care, compensation payments, penalties and possible criminal prosecution.

The New York State Workers' Compensation Board's Bureau of Compliance oversees uninsured claims. The Uninsured Employers Fund (UEF) is the funding mechanism for compensation and medical payments to injured employees whose employer was not properly insured at the time of the accident.

== Risks to an uninsured employer ==
The risks to an uninsured employer are many, and can threaten the continued existence and viability of the firm. These risks include:

1. Possibility of business closure
2. Large fines, which can reach $10,000 or more, depending on state
3. Presumption of negligence
4. Exposure to civil suits by injured workers
5. Criminal conviction and personal fines
6. Imposition of a 10% surcharge in addition to the disability claim, plus attorney fees for the worker

== Dealing with problems ==
While an uninsured employer does face a real problem, such as a prospective fine, prosecution, or employee injury, or is actually sued, there are steps the employer can take to minimize the consequences. Several established law firms can represent the employer in all administrative hearings and appeals, and advise the employer how to proceed. The goal for the uninsured employer is not only to achieve resolution to the immediate problem, but also to protect the assets of the firm, and to reach an accommodation with the regulatory agencies that enables the company to go forward in compliance with the law. The Uninsured Employer Benefit Trust Fund in CA does not have funding or staff to mitigate the value of an uninsured claim. UEBTF merely pays the claim and all costs as claimed by the Applicant/Plaintiff, and assesses the cost against the uninsured employer. If legal counsel is retained by the uninsured employer, there is at least opportunity to mitigate the value/reimbursement to UEBTF. Additionally, legal counsel can sometimes mitigate the administrative penalties, and negotiate repayment plans that allow the business to continue.
