= Labour Standards Bureau =

Japanese government agency

The Labour Standards Bureau (労働基準局, Rōdō Kijunkyoku) is a bureau of the Ministry of Health, Labour and Welfare responsible for maintaining work standards in Japan. It is tasked with securing and improving working conditions, ensuring the safety and health of workers, and is also responsible for managing Workers' Accident Compensation Insurance.

== Structure ==
Located in each of the 47 prefectures of Japan are the prefectural Labour Bureaus. There are also 321 Labour Standards Inspection Offices (plus four branches) located across Japan. The Labour Standards Offices are the first point of contact for employers and employees. They provide advice on laws and regulations and also perform the following tasks:

1) Supervision and guidance for businesses

2) Judicial punishment against serious and vicious violations of laws

3) Handling of applications for approval, reports, etc., submitted by business operators, etc.

4) Dealing with declarations and consultations

5) Inspection for the safety of manufacturing facilities

6) Carrying out investigations for industrial accidents and giving guidance for recurrence prevention

7) Payment of Workers' Accident Compensation Insurance benefits
