= Workers' accident compensation insurance (Japan) =

Government insurance program in Japan

Workers' accident compensation insurance (労働者災害補償保険, rōdōsha saigai hoshō hoken) is a government insurance program in Japan. It pays benefits to workers (or their survivors) if the insured worker suffers injury, illness, or death due to circumstances related to his or her work related duties or commuting. The workers' accident compensation insurance system is also involved in social welfare projects for workers, such as promoting the restoration of workers who have suffered injury or illness to a full role in society. It is paired with unemployment insurance (雇用保険, koyō hoken) and referred to collectively as labour insurance (労働保険, rōdō hoken). Workers' Accident Compensation Insurance is managed by the Labour Standards Office.

== Coverage ==
All companies that employ workers must provide this coverage. The employer bears the burden of paying premiums, workers are not responsible for payments.

== Premiums ==
As of April 2012, the maximum premium rate is 10.3% (for construction work and the like) and the minimum is 0.3% (for work that is mostly clerical). 0.005% is added to the above premium to fund benefits for asbestos-induced diseases. For example, for an office worker earning 250,000 yen per month the premium the employer would have to pay would be around 750 yen.

== Benefits ==
Benefits are paid for any illness, injury, disability or death incurred as a result of an accident caused by work or while commuting.

=== Medical Compensation Benefit ===
As long as injured workers visit a designated hospital for treatment they will not have to pay any costs themselves, it will all be covered by the insurance. If they visit a non-designated hospital they will be charged as usual but can receive a refund later. Costs for medical treatment at home and transportation are also covered.

=== Lost Wage Benefit ===
From the fourth day of missed work onward the insurance covers two-thirds of a worker's lost earnings. This is for workers who are on leave without pay.

=== Illness or Injury Compensation Pension ===
If a worker has not recovered within 18 months they may be eligible to receive this pension.

=== Disability Pension Benefit ===
When disability remains after treatment the worker may be eligible to receive this pension. There are 14 levels of disability covering around 140 types of disability. The worker will receive payment either as a lump sum or pension depending on their circumstances.

=== Bereaved Family Compensation Benefit ===
This is provided to family members who had been financially supported by a worker who died due to a work-related accident.

=== Nursing Care Compensation Benefit ===
This is provided to those who receive the Illness or injury compensation pension or the disability pension benefit who also meet certain other requirements.

=== Funeral Expenses Benefit ===
This partially covers the cost of a deceased worker's funeral

=== Secondary Screening Examination Compensation Benefit ===
Covers the cost of regular medical examinations, if these are thought to be necessary.
