= Prada Female Discrimination Case =

2010 Japanese lawsuit

The Prada Japan discrimination lawsuit, also known as the Prada Female Discrimination Case was a civil lawsuit filed in Japan in 2010.

In March 2010, Rina Bovrisse, and two other colleagues sued Prada Japan, accusing the company of gender discrimination and power harassment based on comments about female employees’ physical appearance. The Tokyo District Court dismissed the case in October 2012. Prada denied all charges and countersued Bovrisse for defamation.

== Litigation ==
In March 2010, Rina Bovrisse, who had been hired by Prada in 2009 as Senior Retail Operations Manager for Japan, Guam, and Saipan and two other colleagues, filed a lawsuit in the Tokyo District Court against Prada Japan. The plaintiffs accused the company of gender discrimination and power harassment based on comments regarding female employees' physical appearance.. Specifically, Bovrisse claimed that Prada Japan CEO had instructed her to dismiss or demote employees he considered unattractive or overweight. Prada Japan and Prada Milan headquarters have denied Bovrisse's allegations. On 26 October 2012, the Tokyo District Court dismissed the claims. Prada filed a countersuit for defamation against Bovrisse in 2010 on seeking ¥33 million (approx. $400,000).

On May 17, 2013, the United Nations Economic and Social Council released its concluding observations regarding the Government of Japan, urging the "State party to introduce in its legislation a definition of sexual harassment" and to "explicitly prohibit discrimination" in the workplace.
