= Hello Work =

Japanese public employment agency

Agency overview
- Formed: October 20, 1953
- Jurisdiction: Government of Japan
- Status: Current
- Parent department: Ministry of Health, Labour and Welfare
- Website: www.hellowork.go.jp

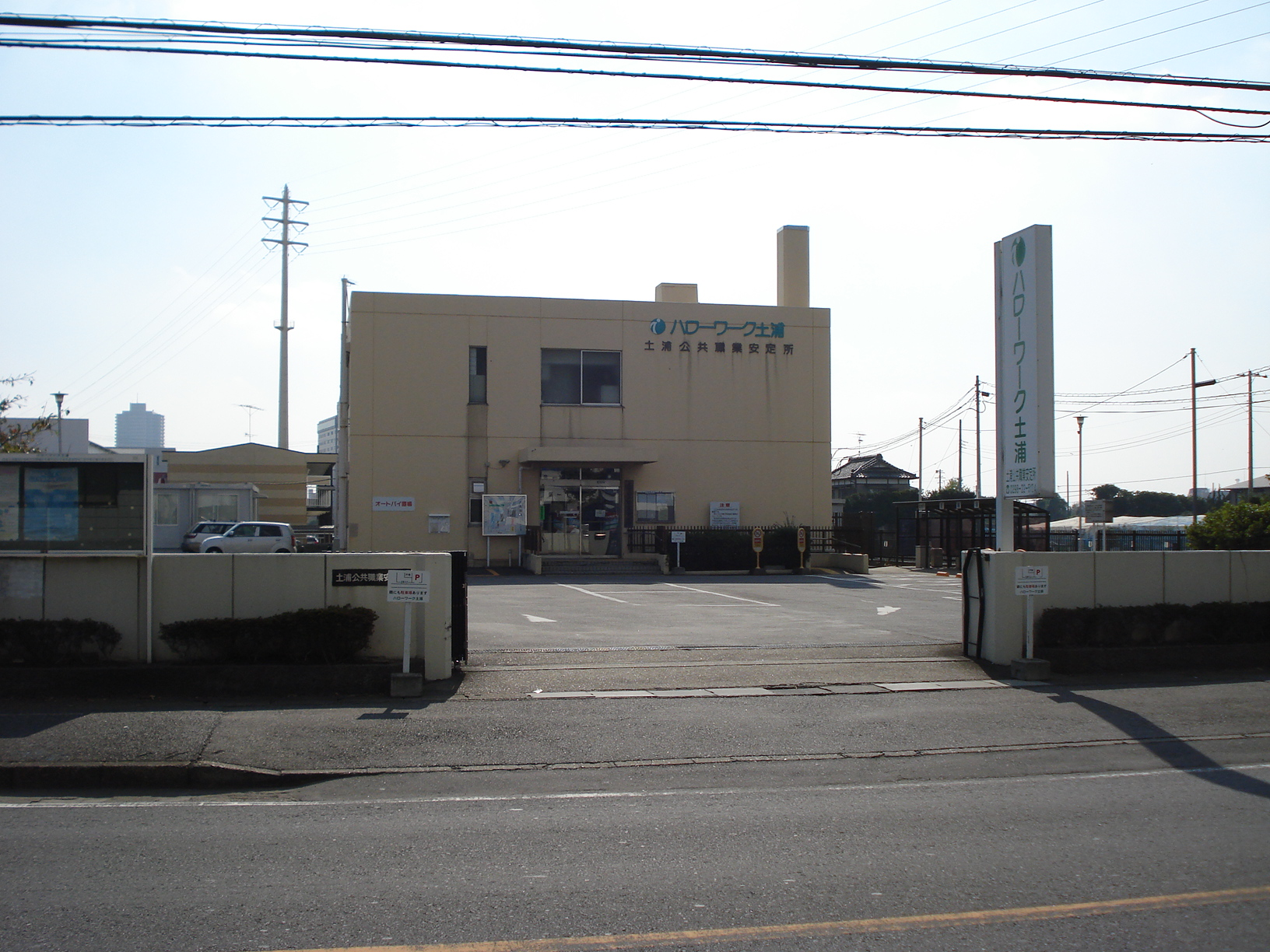
Tsuchiura Public Employment Security Office

Hello Work (ハローワーク, harōwāku) is the Japanese English name for the Japanese government's Employment Service Center.

== Foundation ==
The foundation of Hello Work is based on the Employment Service Convention No. 88 (ratified in Japan on 20 October 1953) under Article 23 of the Japanese Ministry of Health, Labour and Welfare.

== Duties ==
Hello Work offices maintain an extensive database of recent job offers made accessible to job seekers via an in-house intranet system and over the internet.

Additionally, it manages unemployment insurance benefits for both Japanese and foreign unemployed workers, a means tested allowance paid to low-income job seekers without employment insurance who participate in vocational training, and provides job-matching programs to the unemployed.

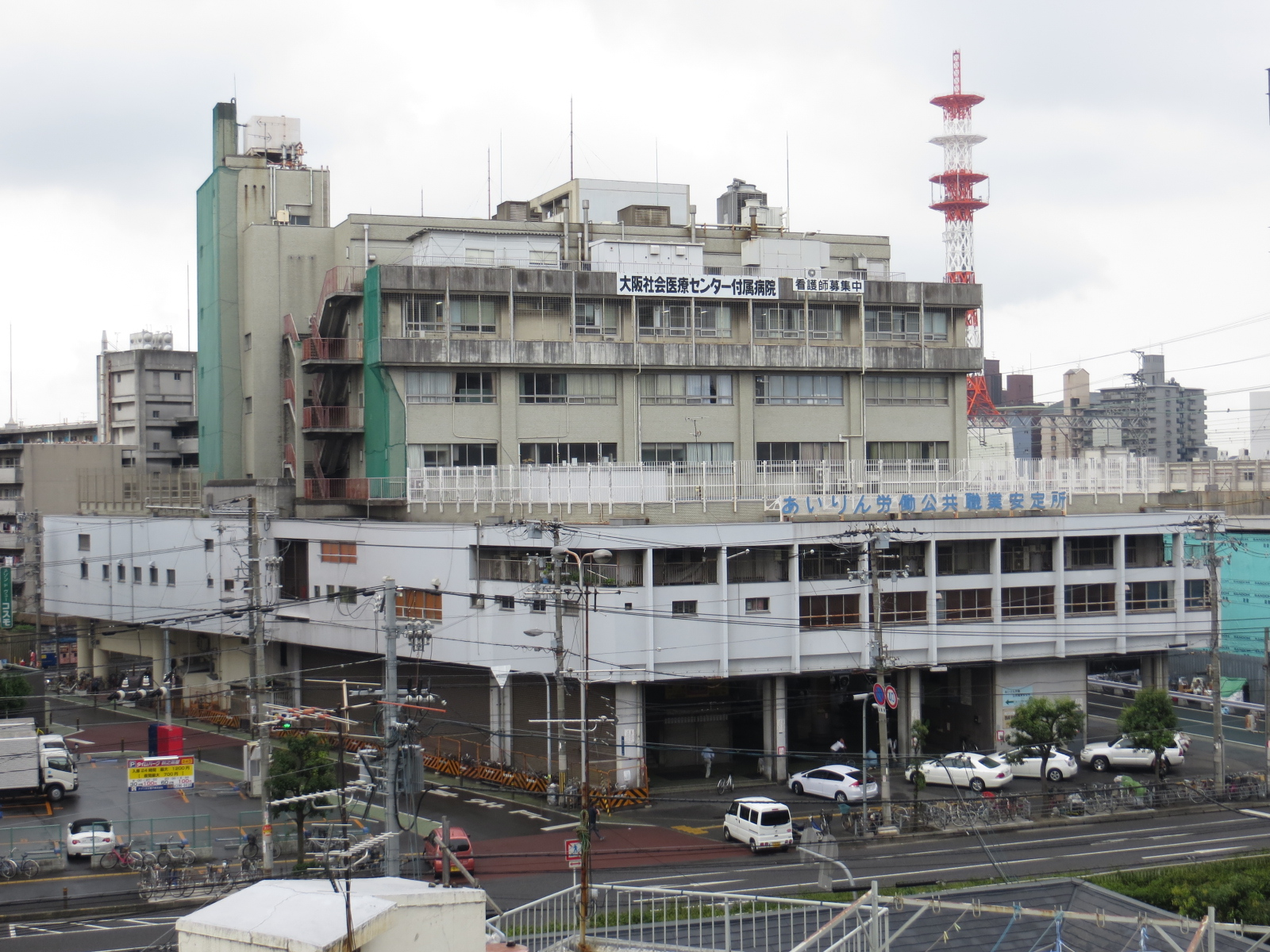
Airin Hello Work Office (Specialized in day laborers)

== Operations ==
There are 544 main offices countrywide that are responsible for administering unemployment benefits, providing job search support and placement to registered job seekers.

As of October 2013 the offices employ 32,765 and serve over 6.6 million people.

== Services ==
The core of employment services – placement and counseling – are publicly provided but many of the other services can be outsourced to the prefecture and local governments.

=== Services for job-seekers ===
Hello Work provides job-seekers with two major services:

Service	Examples
Job application procedures	Job application, employment consultation, occupation introduction
Employment Insurance Procedures	Unemployment benefits, employment promotion benefits, education training benefits, continued employment benefits, continued employment of older people, childcare leave, nursing care leave

Other services include providing information on employment/work, required qualifications and experience for finding employment, information on vocational training courses, etc.

=== Services for young job-seekers ===
Young job seekers benefit from specialized services with dedicated resources through two additional types of front offices:

Scheme	Establishment	Services	Eligibility	Offices
Hello Work for New Graduates	2010	Job search support (including job openings and supporting career guidance counselors in schools and universities)	Students and young people who graduated from high school or higher education within the last three years and have little to no job experience	57 (as of 2017)
Hello Work for Youth	2012	Intensified job search assistance, interview training and placement, psychologist consultations, aptitude tests	Job seekers with previous experience, up to the age of 45	28 (as of 2017)

=== Services for foreign job-seekers ===
Hello Work recommends that foreign residents in Japan improve their Japanese language skills, and as a way to do this it suggests Japanese classes.

Tokyo Hello Work suggests the "Tokyo Nihongo Volunteer Network", founded in 1993, which offers free Japanese lessons.

Almost-free Japanese classes are also offered by many Japanese "International Society" NPOs funded by local governments throughout Japan.

Not all offices offer services in languages other than Japanese. Those that do only offer them during limited hours and in limited languages. Usually English and Mandarin Chinese services are available, and some offices offer services in Spanish, Portuguese, or other languages.

There are a number of centers that specialize in support for foreigners:

- Shinjuku Foreigners' Employment Assistance and Guidance Center
- Nagoya Employment Service Center for Foreigners
- Osaka Employment Service Center for Foreigners
- Hamamatsu Employment Service Center for Foreigners

=== Services for employers ===
Regarding employers, its main services are human resources (job offering, introduction of applicants) and application for employment insurance. Hello Work also provides subsidies and benefits for employers including:

- Subsidy for employers who have to perform employment adjustment.
- Grants for employers hiring people.
- Grants for business owners who wish to start business or develop into new fields.
- Grants for business owners who do capacity development.
- Other grants.

Other services include employment management services (consultation and assistance concerning recruitment and placement, assistance for employment management of the elderly and disabled) and providing information.

== Issues ==
=== Misleading job offers ===
An investigation had found that at least 41 percent of job advertisers were misleading job-seekers by listing exaggerated pay and conditions.

Applicants reported being forced to work longer hours than described, and for less pay, and being told to sacrifice holidays they were entitled to by law.

=== Dangerous work overseas ===
In March 2005, a study published in the Japanese Communist Party’s agency newspaper Shimbun Akahata found that recruitment of Japanese workers working in Iraq as construction contractors with high salaries were undertaken in Japan and published as Job Openings on Hello Work.

At the time, the Ministry of Foreign Affairs had issued a recommendation for the evacuation of Japanese citizens in Iraq.

According to Hello Work Nagasaki, although they had introduced two people, the company in question asked for a withdrawal of the job offer around March 10 of the same year.

=== Harassment case at the Hello Work office in Shizuoka city ===
A 40-year-old female part-time employee who was forced to take a temporary leave due to her boss at the Hello Work office in the Shimizu Ward of Shizuoka City on 10 August 2017 filed a suit against the Shizuoka District Court for about 6.3 million yen in reparations.

According to the complaint, in January 2015 the plaintiff's boss hit her left arm three times. The woman was subsequently diagnosed with depression and anxiety, taking a total of about 5 months off work.
