= Ontario Labour Relations Board =

Canadian government entity

The Ontario Labour Relations Board is an adjudicative agency of the Ministry of Labour, Training and Skills Development and was established by the Ontario government in 1948. It defines itself as "an independent, quasi-judicial tribunal mandated to mediate and adjudicate a variety of employment and labour relations-related matters under a number of Ontario statutes". Its current (2022) chair is Brian O'Byrne.

== Role ==
The Board deals with many types of applications relating to labour relations within the province of Ontario. Most cases at the OLRB involve either the Labour Relations Act, the Occupational Health and Safety Act, or the Employment Standards Act. One of the most important powers of the Ontario Labour Relations Board is the ability to certify trade unions as collective bargaining agents. The Board is also in charge of the union formation, termination and decertification. It also commonly deals with claims of unfair labour practices, occupational health and safety reprisals, duty of fair representation cases, and construction industry grievances, among others.

== Location ==
The Ontario Labour Relations Board is located at 505 University Ave. Toronto, Ontario.

== Decisions ==
Decisions issued by the OLRB are made available on CanLII and commercial legal databases. All reported OLRB decisions back to 1944 are available in the Ontario Workplace Tribunal Library.

== Library ==
The Ontario Workplace Tribunals Library (OWTL) is attached to the Ontario Labour Relations Board and is open to the public. The library collects and organizes materials related to workplace health and safety, human rights/discrimination, pay equity, labour relations and employment law, administrative law and other related subjects. In addition to the Board, the Library provides services to the staff of the Workplace Safety and Insurance Appeals Tribunal.

The library also holds the OLRB collection of bargaining unit certificates issued from 1962 to the present. Certificates issued from 2007 onward are available on the OWTL website.

== Publications ==
The Ontario Labour Relations Board publishes an annual report, bi-monthly reports of significant decisions and a monthly publication of summaries of significant decisions called “Highlights”.

== Support to other Agencies and Commissions ==
In 2008, by the signing of their respective Memoranda of Understanding with the Ministry of Labour, the Board assumed administrative oversight over the Pay Equity Hearings Tribunal. The PEHT has its own OIC appointees (many of whom are cross-appointed from the Board), but relies on the Board for all its administrative and legal support.

== Bibliography ==
- 2019-2020 - Annual report.
- 2018-2019 - Annual report.
