= Unemployment insurance in Japan =

Unemployment insurance (雇用保険, koyou hoken), also known as 失業保険 (shitsugyou hoken), is the "user pays" system of unemployment benefits that operates in Japan. It is paired with Workers' Accident Compensation Insurance (労働者災害補償保険, rousai hoken) and referred to collectively as Labour insurance (労働保険, roudou hoken). It is managed by Hello Work.

== System ==
Japanese unemployment insurance is closer to the US or Canadian "user pays" system than the taxpayer funded systems in place in countries such as the United Kingdom, New Zealand, or Australia. It is paid for by contributions by both the employer and employee.

== Requirements ==
Workers enrolling in unemployment insurance must be working at least 20 hours per week, and to expect to be employed for at least 31 days. Employees who are dispatched to Japan from overseas and who already have coverage in a similar scheme are not required to enroll in Japanese unemployment insurance.

The Ministry of Health, Labour and Welfare of Japan in 2017 plans to cover workers with combined 20 or more hours at different firms in the unemployment insurance. This is due to an increasing trend of irregular employment in labour force since the 1990s. Recent years, the irregular unemployment rate has reached a 35% to 40%, almost doubling the percentage in 1990. This is due to the rising of part-time workers, as well as seniors rehired after retirement. The irregularity thus makes many people work for multiple companies. However, the social welfare coverage for those people are much lower than the full-time regular employees, including health care, pensions and unemployment insurance. With that being said, there is a growing population, with an estimation of 300,000 people not protected by the unemployment insurance but are in an unstable employment conditions. To improve the living standards of those working multiple jobs, and sustain the economy, the Ministry of Health, Labour and Welfare is going to propose it to the Diet for further discussion.

== Procedures ==
On leaving a job, employees are supposed to be given a "Rishoku-hyo" document showing their ID number (the same number is supposed to be used by later employers), employment periods, and pay (which contributions are linked to). The reason for leaving is also documented separately.

== Premiums ==
Premiums are calculated as a certain percentage of each worker's total wage. In April 2023, the insurance premium rate was revised to 1.55% (the employer paying 0.95% and the worker paying 0.6%) with the exception of a few kinds of jobs. In April 2025, the rate was again revised to 1.45% (the employer paying 0.9% and the worker paying 0.55%).

== Payments ==
The circumstances under which an employee left their position affect eligibility, timing, and amount of benefits. The length of time that unemployed workers can receive benefits depends on the age of the employee, and how long they have been employed and paying in.

It is supposed to be compulsory for most full-time employees. If they have been enrolled for at least six months and are fired or made redundant, leave the company at the end of their contract, or their contract is non-renewed, the now-unemployed worker will receive unemployment insurance. If a worker quit of their own accord they may have to wait between one and three months before receiving any payment.

== Rates ==
In July 2016 Japan's unemployment rate was 3%. Japan's unemployment rate has remained relatively low over the years. However July 2016 set the record low in twenty-one years. Despite this recent record low unemployment, Japan has record high job availability. Japan's unemployment rate might fall even lower based on their job availability. Japan's welfare state utilizes an egalitarian principle designed at providing equal aid to all individuals. This style facilitates maintaining low unemployment percentage, high job availability percentage, and a growing economy. Although unemployment rates are dynamic there are many intervening variables correlating to its growth or decline.

== Other unemployment protection ==
Japanese government in 2011 started a new policy implementing occupational training for workers who want to change jobs and the unemployed. This system aims to be the second protection other than the unemployment insurance for people who are struggling in the labour force. With a monthly allowance of ¥100,000 and traffic fee, people who are registered at public employment security offices (PESOs) could receive the occupational training and get ready for their new career. The new job training system categorized 3 different types of training, specifically for job seekers, employed workers and the high school graduates. Most unemployed workers fit in the first category, and based on the released Manuel from the Ministry of Health, Labour and Welfare, their standard training period is 3 months to 1 year, ranging from gardening to architecture. Many women indicate that such job training programs help them transition back to the workplace after staying at home for years. But at the same time, some people are concerned with the quality of the training provided.

== See also ==
- Japanese labour law
- Unemployment benefits
- National Diet
- National Insurance
