= Workplace Safety and Insurance Board =

Government agency in Ontario

- French: Commission de la sécurité professionnelle et de l’assurance contre les accidents du travail

Agency overview
- Formed: 1914
- Preceding agency: Workmen's Compensation Board
- Type: Crown agency
- Jurisdiction: Government of Ontario
- Headquarters: WSIB Place; 300 Tartan Drive; London, Ontario; N5V 0E9
- Agency executives: Grant Walsh, Chair; Jeffery Lang, President & CEO
- Website: wsib.ca

The Workplace Safety and Insurance Board (WSIB) is the workplace compensation board for provincially regulated workplaces in Ontario, Canada. As an agency of the Ontario government, the WSIB operates "at arm's length" from the Ministry of Labour, Training and Skills Development and is solely funded by employer premiums, administration fees, and investment revenue. The WSIB is one of the largest compensation boards in North America and is primarily responsible for administering and enforcing the Ontario Workplace Safety and Insurance Act (WSIA).

Over 100 years old, WSIB covers over five million people in more than 300,000 workplaces across Ontario and works to promote health and safety in the workplace with a goal of one day having zero work-related injuries or illnesses.

== History ==
The Hon. Sir William Ralph Meredith, Chief Justice of Ontario, is the founding father of Workmen's Compensation in Ontario and by extension Canada.

In 1910, Ontario Premier Sir James Whitney [1905 - 1914] appointed Sir William Meredith to head the first Royal Commission into the "laws relating to the liability of employers to make compensation to their employees for injuries received in the course of their employment which are in force in other countries, and as to how far such laws are found to work satisfactorily".

In 1913 Sir William Meredith delivered his Final Report. The agreement between workers and employers creating the first workers compensation board in Canada was called the Historic Trade Off.

However due to pressure from employers the Final Report was shelved. Premier Whitney fell ill in 1914 and Acting Premier William John Hanna did introduce the Workmen's Compensation Act of Ontario becoming law on Jan. 1,1915.

The Historic Trade Off saw workers surrender their Right to the Courts in exchange for the 5 Meredith Principles and employers lost their "fault" defenses.

1. Non adversarial adjudication Sir William Meredith was loath to exchange one adversarial system, the courts, for another. Benefit of doubt to the injured worker, Sir William Meredith closed all loopholes that would impede an injured worker from collecting compensation for a workplace injury. No-fault, Sir William Meredith turned one of the fault defenses against employers, reasoning that if accidents were inherent in the work, then the accidents were inevitable and therefore no ones fault.
2. Compensation for a workplace injury expressed as a percentage of wage, for the life of the injury. Sir William Meredith gave his reasons for the duration being the life of injury in his Final Report. This is the Right workers exchanged the Right to the Courts for.
3. 100% employer funding were assessments collected were to be used exclusively for the benefit of injured workers. Sir William Meredith designed the system so that injured workers would not become a burden on relatives, friends, or the community.
4. Collective liability to ensure security of payment to the injured worker. An added bonus is that collective liability also was an edge against bankruptcy for employer.
5. Autonomous Board, with exclusive jurisdiction, doing what is just to the injured worker. The Provincial Governments entire role in workers compensation was to appoint honourable men to administer the Historic Trade Off.

== Business owners (schedule 1 and schedule 2) ==
WSIB distinguishes between two types of employers under the Workplace Safety and Insurance Act, 1997 (WSIA):

Schedule 1 employers
Primarily private-sector employers across industries such as construction, manufacturing, and services. They are required to have compulsory workplace insurance coverage and pay premiums to the WSIB. Premiums are based on insurable earnings multiplied by a rate assigned according to the employer’s (rate group) classification.

Schedule 2 employers
Primarily public-sector and certain large employers, such as municipalities and other designated organizations. These employers are individually liable, meaning the WSIB pays benefits to injured workers and subsequently recovers the full cost of those benefits, along with administrative expenses, from the employer.

== Claims and benefits ==
Every year, WSIB receives approximately 250,000 claims and pays over $2.5 billion in benefits. Coverage can include full medical care for people injured at work and wage replacement for as long as necessary until they are able to return to work. In the event of a fatality, the WSIB works with the surviving spouse to provide financial help, assistance re-entering the workforce if necessary, and support to provide for the post-secondary education of dependent children.

It is important to report and claim benefits as soon as possible. People who have experienced a workplace injury or illness have six months from the date of the injury to claim their benefits with the WSIB. For a workplace illness, it is generally 6 months from the date of diagnosis. Following the injury or illness, if treatment is needed from a health professional (beyond first aid), the employer is obligated to report it to the WSIB by filling out a Form 7. If the injured or ill person subsequently loses time from work, they must report the injury or illness to the WSIB by filling out and submitting a Form 6.

People who are injured or become ill because of work also have rights and responsibilities under WSIA.

Provincially regulated workers in Ontario workplaces have the right to:

- Know about potential danger
- Participate in making their workplace safe
- Refuse unsafe work

Provincially regulated in Ontario workplaces have a responsibility to:

- Work safely
- Report unsafe work conditions
- Wear the right safety equipment for the job

== Claims process ==
When a claim is reported, WSIB registers the claim and assigns it a claim number; over 90% of eligibility claims are made within two weeks of claim registration. If the claim is allowed, the injured or ill person is contacted and the WSIB begins to collect information from the health care provider (if applicable) and the employer. At this time, the eligibility adjudicator will determine if a claim needs support and if it does, the claim will be sent to a dedicated team of nurse consultants and return-to-work specialists. From here, a case manager, return-to-work specialist and nurse consultant work with the workplace parties to arrange for return to work and recovery.

== Financial Sustainability ==
After reaching a high of $14.2 billion in 2011, WSIB eliminated its unfunded liability in Q2 2018, almost 10 years ahead of the legislated deadline of December 31, 2027. The unfunded liability was the shortage between the money needed to pay future benefits to people injured at work for all established claims, and the money that was in the insurance fund. The elimination of the unfunded liability was accomplished as a result of:

- Premiums exceeding those needed to cover claims and administrative costs
- Better than expected investment returns
- Fewer claims
- Better recovery and return to work

== WSIB governance ==
WSIB's Board of Directors is composed of the chair, the president and CEO, and seven to nine members, who are appointed by the Lieutenant Governor-in-Council. The board governs the WSIB on:

- Workplace safety/reducing injury, disease and fatalities
- Administering the insurance plan
- Providing compensation and other benefits to injured workers and their survivors
- Facilitating workers' recovery, return to work and re-entry into the labour market
