= Labor Standards Act (Japan) =

Japanese law governing working conditions in Japan

The Labor Standards Act (労働基準法, roudou-kijunhou) is a Japanese law. It was enacted on 7 April 1947 to govern working conditions in Japan. According to Article 1 of the Act, its goal is to ensure that "Working conditions shall be those which should meet the needs of workers who live lives worthy of human beings."

== Historical background ==
As the Second World War was nearing its end, on 26 July 1945, Allied leaders Winston Churchill, Harry S Truman, and Chiang Kai-shek issued the Potsdam Declaration, which demanded Japan's unconditional surrender. This declaration also defined the major goals of the postsurrender Allied occupation: "The Japanese government shall remove all obstacles to the revival and strengthening of democratic tendencies among the Japanese people. Freedom of speech, of religion, and of thought, as well as respect for the fundamental human rights shall be established" (Section 10). In addition, the document stated: "The occupying forces of the Allies shall be withdrawn from Japan as soon as these objectives have been accomplished and there has been established in accordance with the freely expressed will of the Japanese people a peacefully inclined and responsible government" (Section 12). The Allies sought not merely punishment or reparations from a militaristic foe, but fundamental changes in the nature of its political system. In the words of political scientist Robert E. Ward: "The occupation was perhaps the single most exhaustively planned operation of massive and externally directed political change in world history."

== Allied Occupation of Japan ==
After the Japanese surrender on 15 August 1945, allied forces, mostly American, rapidly began arriving in Japan. Almost immediately, the occupiers began an intensive program of legal changes designed to democratize Japan.

While it was created while Japan was under occupation, the origins of the Act have nothing to do with the occupation forces. It appears to have been the brainchild of Kosaku Teramoto, a former member of the Special Higher Police, who was now the head of the Labor Standards section of the Welfare Ministry.

The situation during the occupation was very confusing, and Teramoto managed to convince a number of industrialists, bureaucrats, and politicians that GHQ was demanding strict controls on working conditions. He and a small staff then drafted the bill, based on prewar provisions that had been suspended by the military government, as well as a review of International Labor Organization conventions. The occupation authorities knew nothing about the bill until Teramoto handed it to Theodore Cohen, head of GHQ's Labor Division. The Americans gave the law their blessing, and Teramoto was able to tell the industrialists, bureaucrats and politicians that they had no choice but to go along with what the occupation forces wanted.

== Amendments ==
After being passed in 1947, The Labor Standards Act was amended in 1947, 1949 (twice), 1950, 1952, 1954, 1956, 1958, 1959, 1962, 1965, 1967, 1968, 1969, 1972, 1976, 1983, 1984, 1985 (three times), 1987, 1991, 1992, 1993, 1995, 1997, 1998, 1999 (four times), 2001 (three times), 2002 (three times), and 2003 (three times).

The Act was further amended by Act No. 71 of 2018. Article 36, as amended, sets a statutory maximum on overtime hours of 45 hours per month and 360 hours per year. Where an agreement provides for temporary increases in workload, overtime may exceed that maximum, but must remain below 100 hours in any single month and below 720 hours per year, may exceed 45 hours per month in no more than six months of the year, and must not exceed an average of 80 hours per month over any period of between two and six consecutive months.

== Main provisions ==
The law consists of 13 chapters and supplementary provisions:

- Chapter 1 General Provisions (Articles 1–12)
- Chapter 2 Labor Contract (Articles 13–23)
- Chapter 3 Wages (Articles 24–31)
- Chapter 4 Working Hours, Rest Periods, Rest Days, and Annual Paid Leave (Articles 32–41)
- Chapter 5 Safety and Health (Articles 42–55)
- Chapter 6 Juveniles (Articles 56–64)
- Chapter 6-7 Women (Articles 64–2–68)
- Chapter 7 Training of Skilled Laborers (Articles 69–74)
- Chapter 8 Accident Compensation (Articles 75–88)
- Chapter 9 Rules of Employment (Articles 89–93)
  - Articles 89 and 90 cover Work rules
- Chapter 10 Dormitories (Articles 94–96–3)
- Chapter 11 Inspection bodies (Articles 97–105)
- Chapter 12 Miscellaneous Provisions (Articles 105–2–116)
- Chapter 13 Penal Provisions (Articles 117–121)
- Supplementary Provisions

== See also ==
- Japanese labor law
