= Riot Police Unit =

Rapid reaction forces of Japanese police

- 機動隊
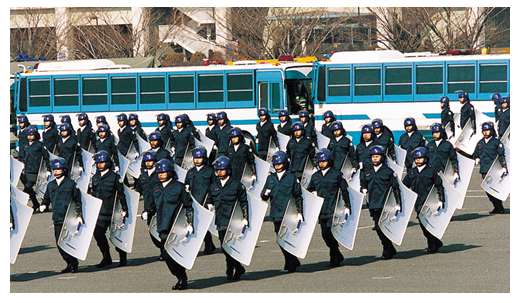
- Active: 1957 – present
- Country: Japan
- Agency: Prefectural police
- Role: Law enforcement; Riot control; Tactical support; Disaster response

Structure
- Sworn members: Approx. 8,000 (full-time members)

Riot Police Unit (機動隊, Kidō-tai) are the rapid reaction forces of Japanese prefectural police. These units are not only riot police, but a type of emergency service unit to maintain public order against large civil disorder, disaster response, or other emergency situations as the key units of Japanese law enforcement for crisis management. They are operated by prefectural police headquarters (PPH) under the supervision of the Security Bureau of the National Police Agency (NPA).

== Background ==
Before World War II, the Tokyo Metropolitan Police Department (TMPD) established the Emergency Service Unit (特別警備隊, Tokubetsu-keibi-tai). During the war, as air raids on Japan intensified and civilian casualties increased, the TMPD ESU was enhanced for relief missions and renamed as the Security Unit (警備隊, Keibi-tai). At the same time, it was decided to set up similar units in other prefectures with major cities. However, in 1946, the Security Units were disbanded as part of police reforms enacted by the Supreme Commander for the Allied Powers under the occupation.

Shortly after the TMPD ESU was disbanded, the Guard Section (防護課, Bougo-ka) was created for the same role. In 1948, this unit was reinforced to the Police Reserve Units (予備隊, Yobi-tai). In addition, similar but smaller-scale riot squads were created in several other prefectures to deal with post-war turmoil. In 1952, under the direction of the National Rural Police Headquarters (国家地方警察本部, Kokka-chihō-keisatsu Honbu), the Riot Police Units were created with 20 prefectures with large cities. In 1957, the TMPD Reserve Units were renamed the Riot Police Unit. By 1962, all PPHs had the same kind of units.

== Organization ==
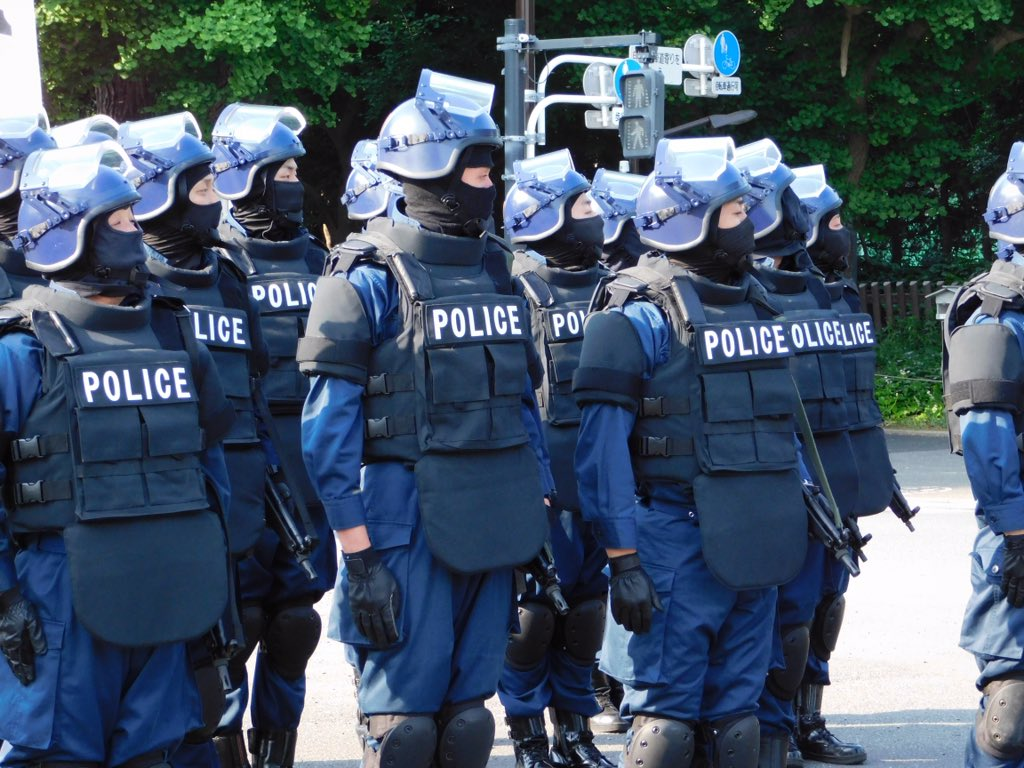
TMPD Emergency Response Team (ERT) officers

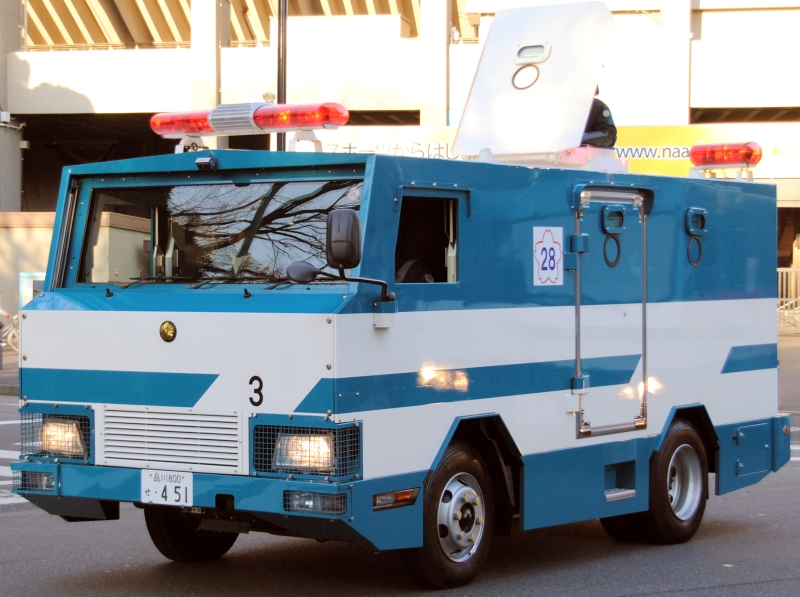
Special Armored Vehicle of the TMPD 3rd Riot Police Unit

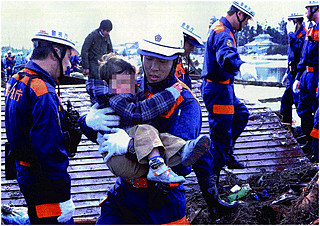
TMPD SAR officers rescuing a child during the 2011 Tōhoku earthquake relief mission

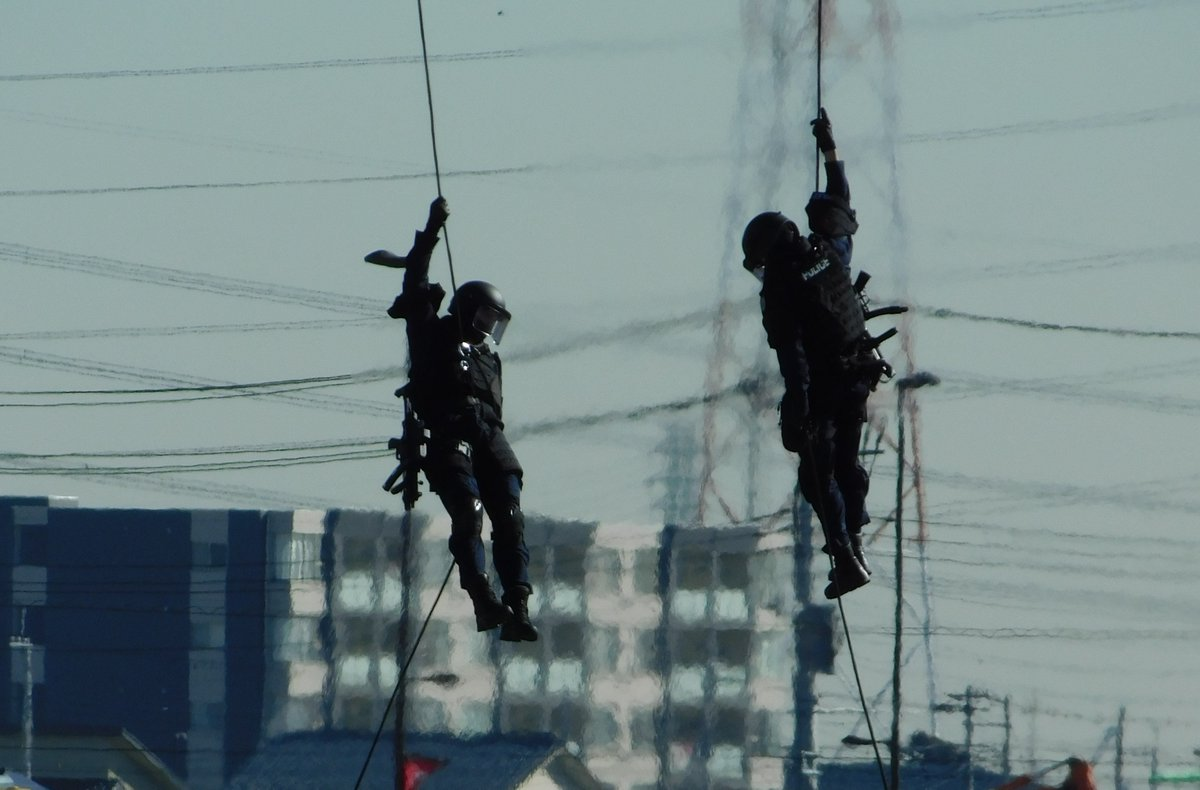
Saitama Prefectural Police Riots And Tactics Squad (RATS) officers rappelling from a helicopter

Riot Police Units comprise the main strength of the Security Departments (警備部, Keibi-bu) of each prefectural police headquarters (PPHs). Most PPHs have only one unit, but some urban PPHs have multiple units. For example, there are ten units (nine ordinary units and one Special Vehicle Unit) in the TMPD.

Each unit consists of a headquarters and some companies. The public relations divisions, known as "DJ cops", are placed in each unit headquarters. They rely on eloquent and humorous speaking to prevent crowd disasters.

=== Specialist squads ===
The equipment of the anti-riot officers is largely the same as that of regular police officers. However, equipment used in riot control operations, such as protective gear, may differ. And within the Riot Police Units, there are certain squads with specific equipment and training.

==== Counterterrorism ====
Anti-firearms squad (銃器対策部隊, Jūki-taisaku-butai)
As a response to the Kin Kiro incident, the NPA requested the establishment of the Special Firearms Squad (特殊銃隊, Tokushujū-tai) for every PPHs in 1969, and until 1973, all PPHs had these kind of squads as a part of the Riot Police Units.
At this time, these squads were part-time sniper teams called only when needed. Then, in 1996, they were reorganized as local full-time counterterrorism squads cooperating with the national-level Special Assault Teams. Since the deployment of Heckler & Koch MP5 submachine guns in 2002. In response to the 2015 Paris attacks, they have also began to deploy M4 carbines during operations in major cities.

Its current strength is about 1,900 officers. They are mainly mandated for gun violence, and also serve as first responders for emergency situations at nuclear power plants. Certain units with enhanced capabilities are established in urban prefectures, such as the Emergency Response Team (ERT) of the TMPD, the Armed Response Team (ART) of the Osaka PPH, and the Riot And Tactics Squad (RATS) of the Saitama PPH.

Counter-NBC terrorism squad (NBCテロ対応専門部隊, NBC-terror-taiou-senmon-butai)
Chemical, biological and nuclear defense squads. In some PPHs, they had been enhanced as an independent unit. They work in coordination with the AFS and the SAT.

Bomb disposal squad

Nuclear special guard unit (原発特別警備部隊, Genpatsu-tokubetu-keibi-butai)
A firearms unit meant to nuclear facilities throughout Japan since May 2002.

==== Search and rescue ====
Rescue squads (機動救助隊, Kidō-kyūjo-tai)
Technical rescue squads equipped with Heavy rescue vehicles. Ordinary rescue squads are part-time units, but in the Security Bureau of the TMPD (outside of its Riot Police Units), there is also Special Rescue Team (特殊救助隊, Tokushu-kyūjo-tai), the only full-time rescue team in Japanese police.
Ranger squads (レンジャー部隊, Renjā-butai)
In 1969, the TMPD established a Ranger squad in its 7th Riot Police Unit under the support of the Japan Ground Self-Defense Force. Its primary mission was mountain rescue, but with its superior mountaineering skills, this squad was used to deal with hostage rescue missions such as the Asama-Sansō incident.
In 2001, the TMPD reorganized its Ranger squad into the Mountain-rescue ranger (山岳救助レンジャー, Sangaku-kyūjo-renjā) and the Anti-firearms ranger (銃器対策レンジャー, Jūki-taisaku-renjā), combines firearms and mountaineering capability.
Water rescue squads (水難救助部隊, Suinan-kyūjo-butai)
Public safety diving and rescue swimmers squads.

Also, as non-permanent units prepared for large scale disasters, the Interprefectural emergency rescue units (広域緊急援助隊, Kouiki-kinkyū-enjotai) have been established based on the lesson of the Great Hanshin earthquake. Members of these units work mainly in Riot Police Units or Regional Riot Police Units during peacetime, but they regularly gather and train in preparation for disasters.

=== Reserves ===
Full-time riot police units can also be augmented by auxiliary riot police units with regular police officers trained in riot duties. There are two types of auxiliary riot police units:

Secondary Riot Police Units (第二機動隊, Dai-Ni-Kidō-tai)
These units operate as a reserve duty forces under control of each PPH, temporary formation units being organized by gathering police officers who usually work at police stations. In the TMPD, these kind of units are referred to as the Special Riot Police Units (特別機動隊, Tokubetsu-Kidō-tai).
Regional Riot Police Units (管区機動隊, Kanku-Kidō-tai)
These units are under control of Regional Police Bureaus of the NPA for regional operations as reinforcements to the other prefectures. In many prefectures, they are part-time units organized by members selected from the front-line units of each PPHs, such as inter-regional patrol units or mobile investigation units; but in some prefectures, they are full-time units and usually deployed in the same way as regular Riot police units under the command of each PPHs. Even though they are reserves, they are well equipped and trained not much different from regular units according to the national standards of the NPA.

== Operational history ==
Riot Police Units have been widely deployed in dealing with large civil disorder, disaster response, counter-terrorism operations, and so on as below:

Bloody May Day Incident (血のメーデー事件) (1952)
Some of the International Workers' Day protesters were incited by Zengakuren and Chōren, causing riots. As a result, some of the TMPD Reserve Units members were forced to use pistols because of the frequent occurrence of violent acts, such as burning foreigners' cars and throwing policemen into the moat.
Humanitarian response to the Typhoon Vera (伊勢湾台風) (1959)
Many Riot Police Units were dispatched from other police headquarters because of the large-scale flood damage. In particular, the Second Riot Police Unit of the TMPD were highly appreciated, and became known as "Kappa".
Riot control against student activism of the University of Tokyo (東大紛争) (1969)
At the University of Tokyo, the student movement had been intensifying since 1968, triggered by a demand for improvement in the treatment of internships at the Faculty of Medicine. Then, with the left-wing rebel groups joined this movement to find allies for the Anpo protests, they stood up in the school buildings and brought in weapons such as Molotov cocktails. With university officials unable to deescalate the incident, TMPD Riot Police Units were deployed to retake the occupied school buildings.
Asama-Sansō incident (1972)
The United Red Army had been trained in the mountains, but was discovered by the Riot Police Unit of the Nagano PPH, turned into a gunfight and held hostage. After a 10-day siege, Nagano PPH, with the support of TMPD, Kanagawa and Yamanashi PPH, carried out a rescue operation. The criminals fired guns, threw bombs and violently resisted, while one Superintendent and one Chief inspector of the TMPD Riot Police Unit were killed and many police officers were injured, but all five criminals were arrested and the hostage was also rescued safely.
Activities against Aum Shinrikyo (1995)
In response to the Tokyo subway sarin attack, the TMPD Riot Police Units worked with the Tokyo Fire Department to rescue the victims. They also assisted the detectives raiding into the facilities at Yamanashi Prefecture. For this task, they borrowed personal protective equipments from the SDF.
Humanitarian response to the 2011 Tōhoku earthquake and tsunami
In response to the massive damage caused by the tsunami, the Police mobilized Riot Police Units, Regional Riot Police Units and Interprefectural emergency rescue units in an effort to rescue them. And as the reaction to Fukushima Daiichi nuclear disaster, Riot Police Units conducted evacuation guidance for the elderly and patients, and also carried out water discharge to the reactor building and measured the air radiation dose.
