= Tokubetsu-keibi-tai =

Tokubetsukeibitai may refer to:

- Tokubetsu-keibi-tai (Imperial Japanese Army), counter-insurgency units of the Imperial Japanese Army.
- Tokubetsukeibitai (Navy), of the Imperial Japanese Navy.
- Tokubetsu-keibi-tai (Metropolitan Police Department), an emergency service unit of the Tokyo Metropolitan Police Department in the pre-war era.
- Tokubetsu-keibi-tai (Imperial Guard), a special reaction team of the Imperial Guard Headquarters of the Japan.
- Tokubetsu-keibi-tai (Japan Coast Guard), special reaction teams of the Japan Coast Guard.
- Special Boarding Unit, a special forces unit of the Japan Maritime Self-Defense Force.
