= Senior superintendent =

Police rank that used in Asian countries

Senior superintendent, also police senior superintendent or senior superintendent of police, is a senior rank in police forces used in Brunei, Estonia, Germany, South Korea, Hong Kong, India, Lesotho, Pakistan, Sri Lanka, Tanzania, and formerly in the Philippines and in Japan.

== Brunei ==
Royal Brunei Police Force use this rank, and it was lower than an assistant commissioner and higher than a full superintendent.

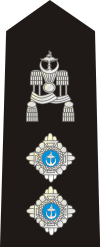
Brunei

== Estonia ==
The Estonian Police and Border Guard Board use this rank, it was below a police lieutenant, but higher than a full superintendent.

Estonia

== Germany ==
In Germany's Bundespolizei (Federal Police), it was lower than a chief superintendent and higher than a full superintendent.

Germany

== Hong Kong ==
In Hong Kong, like in the Philippines, senior superintendent is lower than a chief superintendent, but higher than a full superintendent. The officers with this rank are normally commands Bureau, or is second in charge of a District.

== India ==
A Senior Superintendent of Police (SSP) is a police officer responsible for overseeing larger police districts or specialised units in India. This position is typically held by a Superintendent of Police who has been promoted to the Selection Grade, indicating a higher level of seniority and expertise within the Indian Police Service (IPS) or State Police Services (SPS). In the hierarchy, a senior superintendent ranks above a superintendent but below a deputy inspector general of police. In Metropolitan cities like Delhi, Mumbai, Hyderabad, Bengaluru, Kolkata, Chennai, Ahmedabad, Pune etc. This rank is also called Deputy Commissioner of Police.

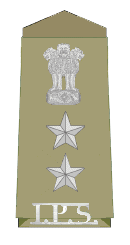
Rank insignia

== Japan ==
In Japan, it was formerly used by the Prefectural police, who commands a large police station. It was replaced by the rank of assistant commissioner, and equivalent to a Japanese army Colonel.

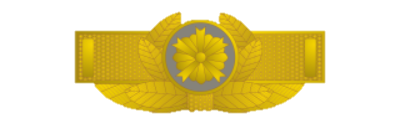
Japan

== Lesotho ==
Lesotho Mounted Police Service's version of the rank, it was lower than an assistant commissioner and higher than a full superintendent.

Lesotho

== Pakistan ==
The senior superintendent in Pakistan police was almost the same as its Indian counterpart, lower than a deputy inspector general, and higher than a superintendent.

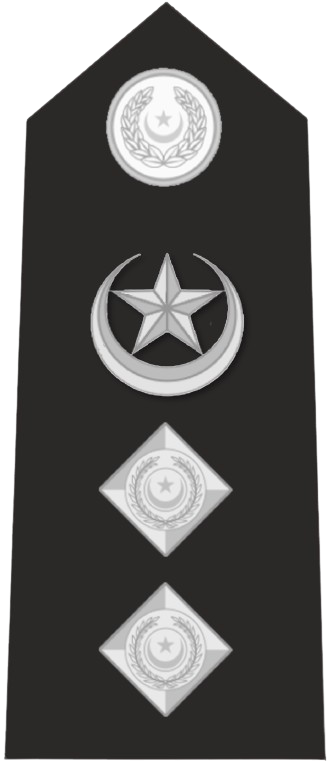
Pakistan

== Philippines ==
Even the Philippine police did not use it and replaced by the rank of Police Lieutenant Colonel, its civilian fire protection and jail management services are still using it, and it was higher than a full superintendent, and lower than a chief superintendent.

Philippines

== South Korea ==
In South Korean police, the Senior Superintendent was lower than a superintendent general, and higher than a full superintendent. The police officers of this rank are the chief of a police station.

South Korea

== Sri Lanka ==
Senior superintendent in Sri Lanka Police was almost the same of the Indian and Pakistan police services: lower than a deputy inspector general, and higher than a superintendent.

Sri Lanka

== Tanzania ==
The senior superintendent in Tanzanian Police is lower than an assistant commissioner, but higher than a full superintendent.

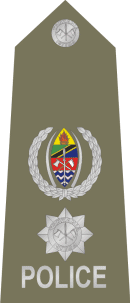
Tanzania
