= Prefectural police =

Regional law enforcement agencies in Japan

Prefectural police 都道府県警察 Todōfuken-Keisatsu
- The Asahikage, the symbol of Japanese police

Agency overview
- Employees: 288,000 (2020)

Jurisdictional structure
- Operations jurisdiction: Japan
- Legal jurisdiction: Prefectural
- General nature: Civilian police

Operational structure
- Police officers: 260,000
- Civilian employees: 28,400
- Parent agency: National Police Agency

In the law enforcement system in Japan, prefectural police (都道府県警察, todōfuken-keisatsu) are prefecture-level law enforcement agencies responsible for policing, law enforcement, and public security within their respective prefectures of Japan. (Note: In the Article 2 of the Police Law (警察法, Keisatsu-hō), responsibilities and duties of the police are prescribed as follows: to protect the life, physical body and property of an individual, and take charge of prevention, suppression and investigation of crimes, as well as apprehension of suspects, traffic control and other affairs concerning the maintenance of public safety and order.) Although prefectural police are, in principle, regarded as municipal police, they are mostly under the central oversight and control of the National Police Agency.

As of 2020, the total strength of the prefectural police is approximately 260,000 sworn officers and 28,400 civilian staff, a total of 288,400 employees.

== History ==
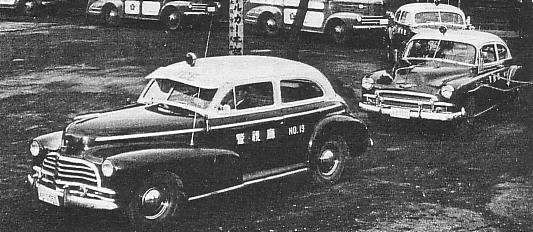
Osaka City Municipal Police cars, c. 1948–1955. This photograph predates the prefectural police system.

In the Empire of Japan, territorial police forces were organised as departments of police of each prefectural offices (府県警察部, fuken-keisatsu-bu). They were placed under complete centralized control, with the Police Affairs Bureau (警保局, Keiho-kyoku) of the Home Ministry at their core.

After the surrender of Japan, the Supreme Commander for the Allied Powers regarded this centralized police system as undemocratic. During the occupation of Japan, the principle of decentralisation was introduced by the 1947 Police Law (警察法, Keisatsu-hō) (now commonly referred to as "Old Police Law"). Cities and large towns had their own municipal police services (自治体警察, jichitai keisatsu), and the National Rural Police (国家地方警察, Kokka Chihō Keisatsu) was responsible for smaller towns, villages and rural areas. However, most Japanese municipalities were too small to have an effectively large police force, so sometimes they were unable to deal with large-scale violence. In addition, excessive fragmentation of the police organisation reduced the efficiency of police activities.

As a response to these problems, complete restructuring created a more centralized system under the 1954 amended Police Law (警察法, Keisatsu-hō). All operational units except for the Imperial Guard were reorganized into the prefectural police departments for each prefecture and the National Police Agency was established as the central coordinating agency for these police departments.

== Organisation ==
Each prefectural police department comprises a police authority and operational units: Prefectural Public Safety Commissions (PPSC) and Prefectural Police Headquarters (PPH).

=== Prefectural Public Safety Commission ===
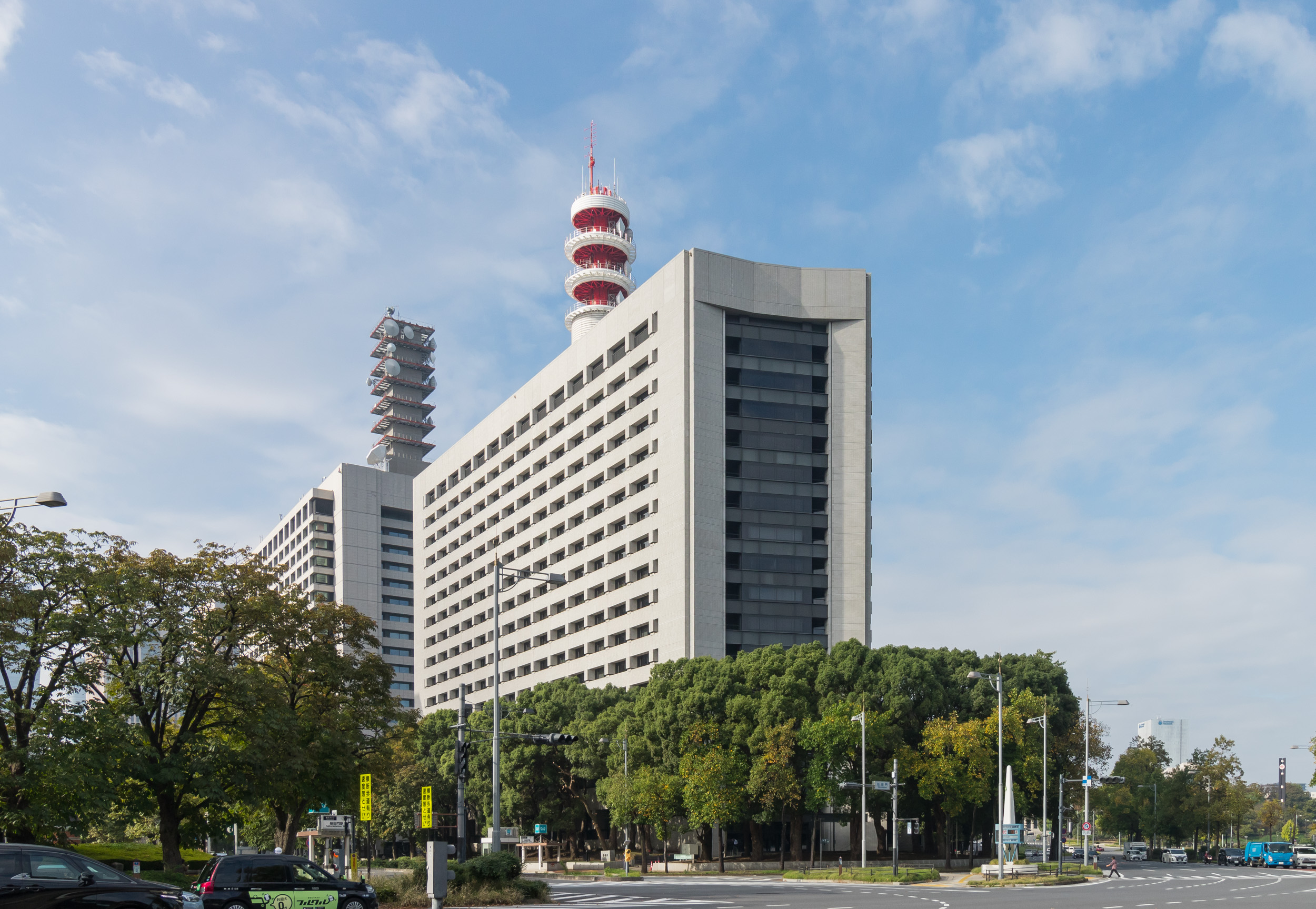
Tokyo Metropolitan Police Department headquarters building in Kasumigaseki, Chiyoda

Prefectural Public Safety Commissions (都道府県公安委員会, todōfuken kōan īnkai) are administrative committees established under the jurisdiction of prefectural governors to provide citizen oversight for police activities. A committee consists of three members in an ordinary prefecture and five members in urban prefectures. The members of prefectural public safety commission are appointed by the governor with the consent of the prefectural assembly.

=== Prefectural Police Headquarters ===
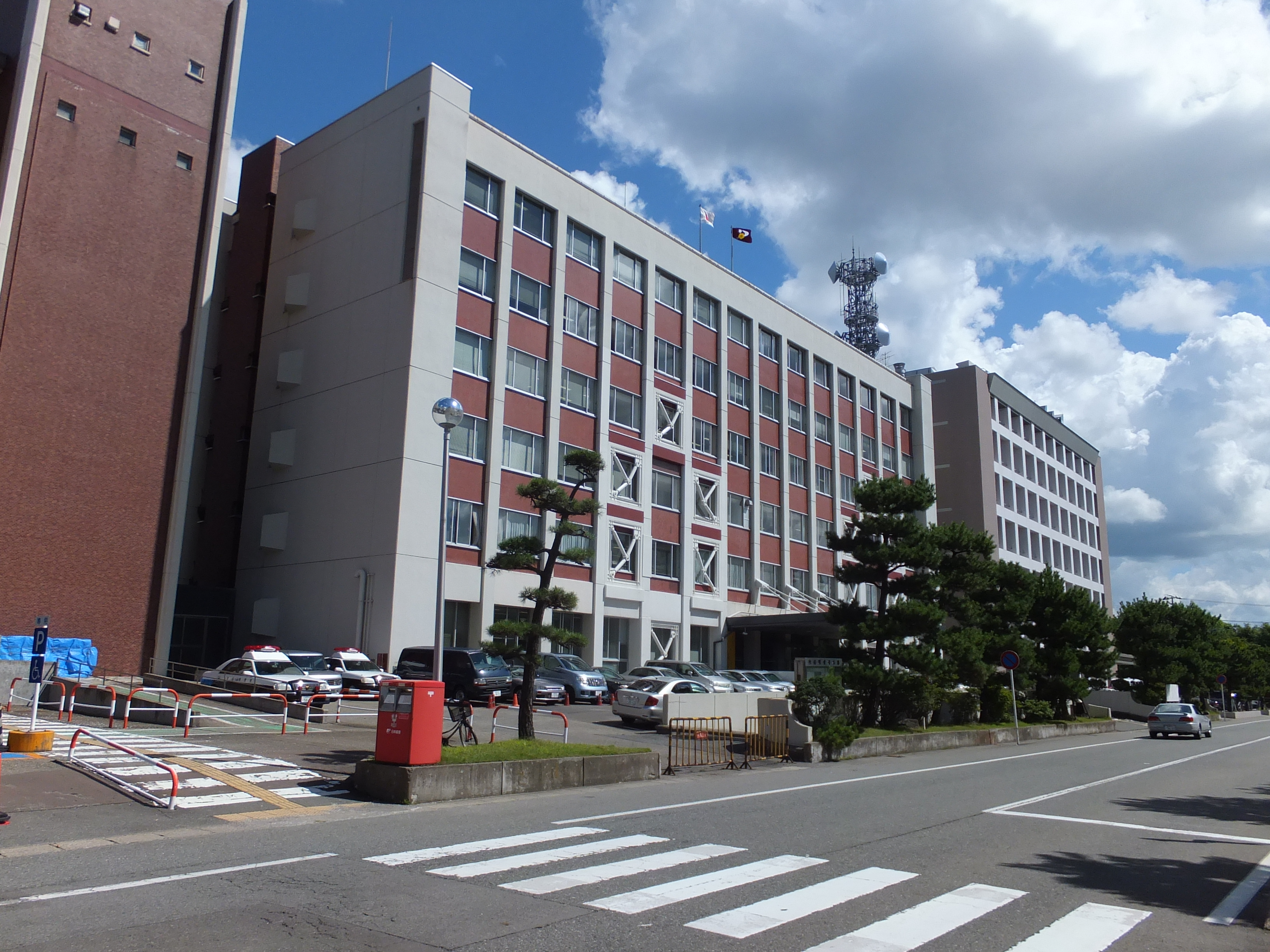
The Akita Prefectural Police Headquarters in Akita City

In Tokyo, the Prefectural Police Headquarters (警察本部, keisatsu-honbu) specifically refers to the Tokyo Metropolitan Police Department. Also, Hokkaido Prefectural Police Headquarters is known as dō-keisatsu-honbu (道警察本部), and those in Ōsaka and Kyoto Prefectures are known as fu-keisatsu-honbu (府警察本部), and are distinguished from other Prefectural Police Headquarters (県警察本部, ken-keisatsu-honbu).

The Chiefs of Prefectural police headquarters (警察本部長, keisatsu-honbu-chō) are appointed officials at the top of the chain of command in each Prefectural Police Headquarters. In the Tokyo Metropolitan Police Department, the name of Superintendent General (警視総監, Keishi-sōkan) is used.

These police departments are responsible for every police actions within their jurisdiction in principle, but most important activities are regulated by the National Police Agency. Police officers whose rank are higher than assistant commissioner (警視正, keishi-sei) are salaried by the national budget even if they belong to local police departments. Designation and dismissal of these high-ranking officers are delegated to the National Public Safety Commission.

Each Prefectural police headquarters contains administrative departments (bureaus in the TMPD) corresponding to those of the bureaus of the National Police Agency as follows:

- Police administration department (警務部, keimu-bu)
- Criminal investigation department (刑事部, keiji-bu)
- Traffic department (交通部, kōtsu-bu)
- Security department (警備部, keibi-bu)
- Community safety department (生活安全部, seikatsu-anzen-bu)

In addition, urban prefectural police departments comprise a general affairs department (総務部, sōmu-bu) and a community police department (地域部, chiiki-bu).

There are some 289,000 police officers nationwide, about 97% of whom were affiliated with Prefectural Police Headquarters.

==== Community policing ====
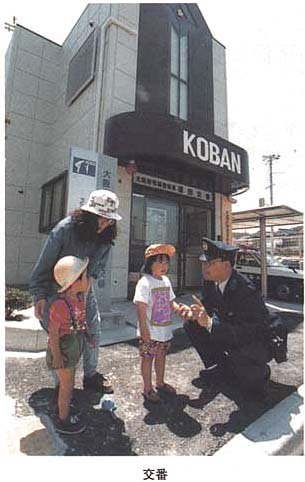
A police officer talking to children in front of a kōban

In the Japanese police, community policing is treated as being close to crime prevention, and in rural prefectural police, community safety departments in charge of crime prevention sometimes concurrently handle community policing. Community policing officers are organised into several police stations (警察署, Keisatsu-sho). Each station includes the following sections:

- Police administration section (警務課, keimu-ka)
- Traffic section (交通課, kōtsu-ka)
- Security section (警備課, keibi-ka)
- Community police affairs section (地域課, chiiki-ka)
- Community safety section (生活安全課, seikatsu-anzen-ka)
- Criminal investigation section (刑事課, keiji-ka)

Officers of the community police affairs sections are distributed in their jurisdictions, working at police boxes, residential police boxes (駐在所, Chūzai-sho), radio mobile patrols, etc.

These community policing officers are supported by the community police department or the community safety department of the prefectural police headquarters. In addition to the administration of the police radio networks, they provide inter-regional patrol units and air support: automobile patrols (自動車警ら隊, jidōsha-keira-tai) and a police aviation unit (警察航空隊, keisatsu-kōku-tai), and many other assets.

==== Traffic policing ====
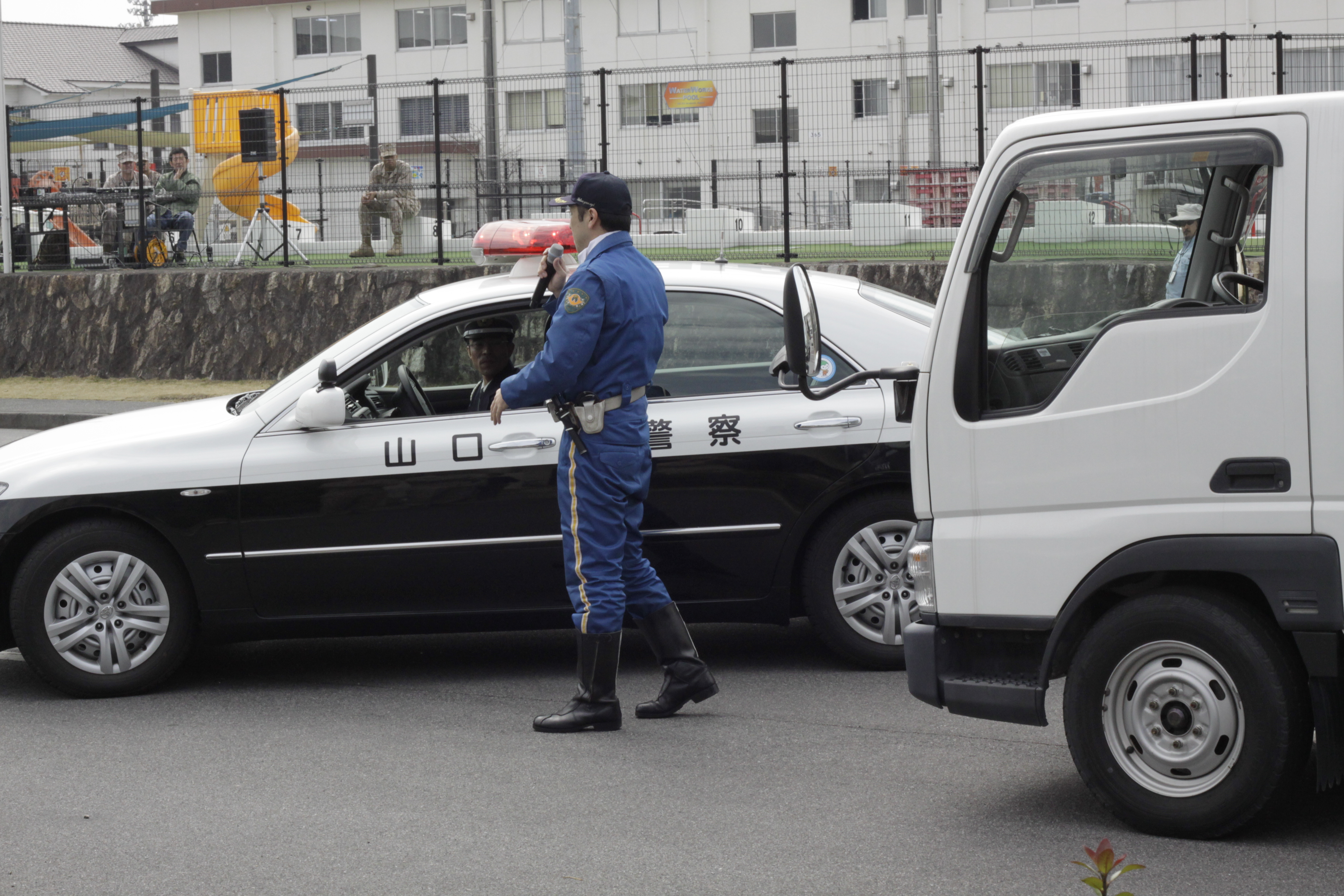
A Yamaguchi Prefectural Police officer demonstrating traffic stop procedures in Iwakuni

Originally traffic policing was mainly done by community policing officers. However, with the progress of motorization since the 1950s, traffic accidents have increased dramatically, resulting in the so-called traffic war, the system of traffic police was also strengthened.

From the mid-1960s, mobile patrol units were installed at several PPHs, and in 1972 they were installed at all traffic departments of the PPHs as Mobile Traffic Units (交通機動隊, Kōtsu-kidō-tai). Traffic cars (including unmarked cars) and police motorcycles are deployed in these units. And as the development of the expressway advanced, the establishment of the Expressway Traffic Police Units (高速道路交通警察隊, Kōsoku-dōro kōtsu-keisatsu-tai) was also decided in 1971.

==== Criminal investigation ====
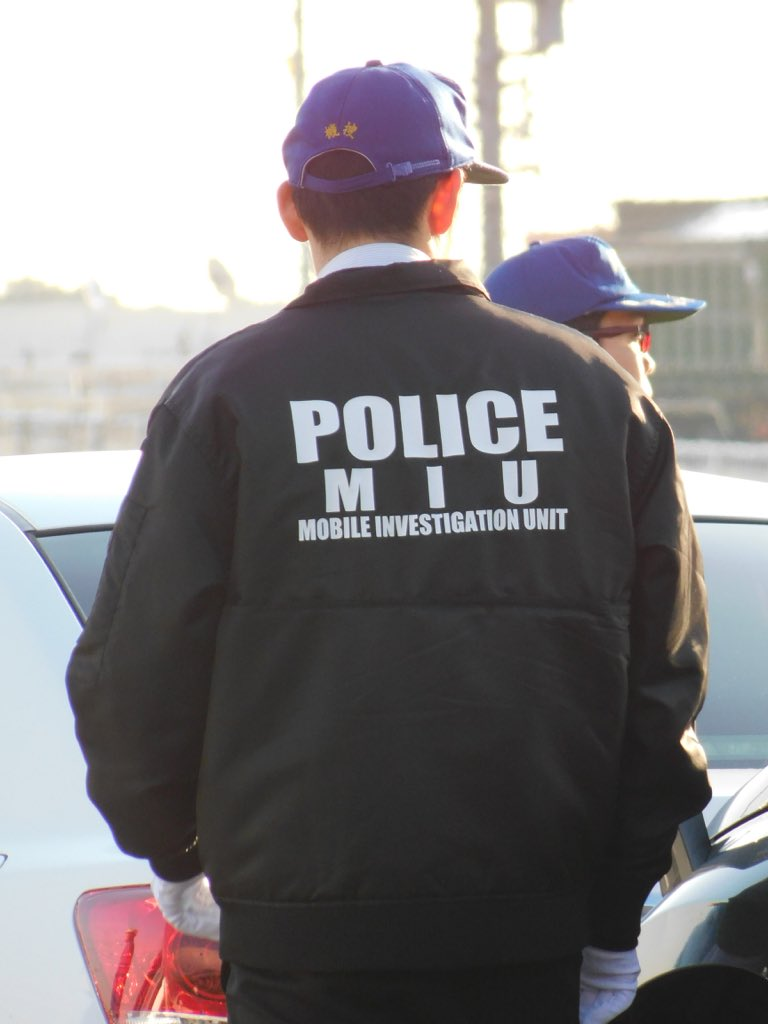
A detective of the Aichi Prefectural Police Mobile Investigation Unit

In the Empire of Japan, the criminal investigation was presided over by prosecutors, like the ministère public does in French law. With the 1947 Police Law (警察法) and the 1948 Code of Criminal Procedure (刑事訴訟法), the responsibility of investigation has been defined to be uniquely assigned to police officers. In order to fulfil this responsibility, criminal investigation departments or criminal investigation bureaus (judiciary police) were set up in each police organisation. After the establishment of the 1954 amended Police Law, these departments are supervised by the Criminal Affairs Bureau of the National Police Agency.

Criminal investigation departments or criminal investigation bureaus maintain two investigation divisions (捜査課, sousa-ka) (third or even fourth divisions are established in some urban prefecture), an organised crime investigation division (組織犯罪対策課, soshikihanzai-taisaku-ka) (reinforced as an independent department or headquarters in the TMPD and some prefectures), a mobile investigation unit, and an identification division (鑑識課, kanshiki-ka). The mobile investigation units (機動捜査隊, kidō sousa-tai) are first responders for initial criminal investigations, distributed among the region with unmarked cars. The special investigation teams are specialised detective units of the first investigation divisions, well acquainted with new technology and special tactics including tactical capabilities. They are mandated for critical incidents except for terrorism, but in some rural but well-versed prefectural police like Aomori Prefectural Police, these detectives can form a counterterrorism task force together with uniformed officers and riot specialists.

==== Public security ====
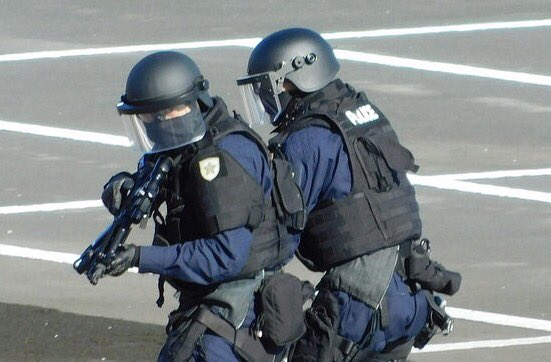
Riots And Tactics Squad (RATS) officers of the Saitama Prefectural Police

In the Tokyo Metropolitan Police Department, the jurisdiction for public security policing is divided into the Public Security Bureau and Security Bureau (警備部, Keibi-bu), being responsible for investigation activities and security forces operations, respectively. In other PPHs, their security departments are in charge of all public security policing matters; but in the departments, they are divided in the same way as they are done by the MPD. They are supervised by the Security Bureau of the National Police Agency.

Within their security departments or bureaus, each PPH maintains Riot Police Units, which serve as a rapid reaction force capable of fulfilling riot police, police tactical unit, and search and rescue roles. Full-time riot police can also be augmented by regular police trained in riot duties.

Counterterrorism operations are also the affairs of the security departments. The Special Assault Teams are the national-level units and Anti-Firearms Squads (銃器対策部隊, Jūki-taisaku-butai) are the local units. These units are established within the RPU basically, but the SAT of the TMPD and Osaka PPH are under direct control of their Security Bureau (TMPD) or Department (Osaka PPH).

==== Ranks ====
Police officers are divided into nine ranks:

Status	Police ranks	Comparable military ranks	Representative job title(s)	Rank insignia	Shoulder Cords
Government officials	Commissioner General (警察庁長官, Keisatsu-chō Chōkan)	No counterpart (outside normal ranking)	The chief of the NPA		
Government officials	Superintendent General (警視総監, Keishi-sōkan)	General	The chief of the TMPD		
Government officials	Senior commissioner (警視監, keishi-kan)	Lieutenant general	Deputy commissioner general, deputy superintendent general, the chief of a regional police bureau and the chief of a PPH		
Government officials	Commissioner (警視長, keishi-chō)	Major general	The chief of a PPH		
Government officials	Assistant Commissioner (警視正, keishi-sei)	Colonel	The chief of a police station		
Local police personnel	Superintendent (警視, keishi)	Lieutenant colonel	The chief of a small or middle police station, the vice commanding officer of a police station and commander of a riot police unit		
Local police personnel	Chief inspector (警部, keibu)	Major or captain	Squad commander in a police station and leader of a riot company		
Local police personnel	Inspector (警部補, keibu-ho)	Captain or lieutenant	Squad sub-commander in a police station and leader of a riot platoon		
Local police personnel	Police sergeant (巡査部長, junsa-buchō)	Warrant officer or Sergeant	Field supervisor and leader of a police box		
Local police personnel	Senior police officer (巡査長, junsa-chō)	Private first class	Honorary rank of police officers		
Local police personnel	Police officer (巡査, junsa)	Private	A prefectural police officer's career starts from this rank		

The National Police Agency Commissioner General holds the highest position of the Japanese police. His title is not a rank, but rather denotes his position as head of the NPA. On the other hand, the Tokyo Metropolitan Police Department Superintendent General represents not only the highest rank in the system but also assignment as head of the TMPD.

== Equipment ==
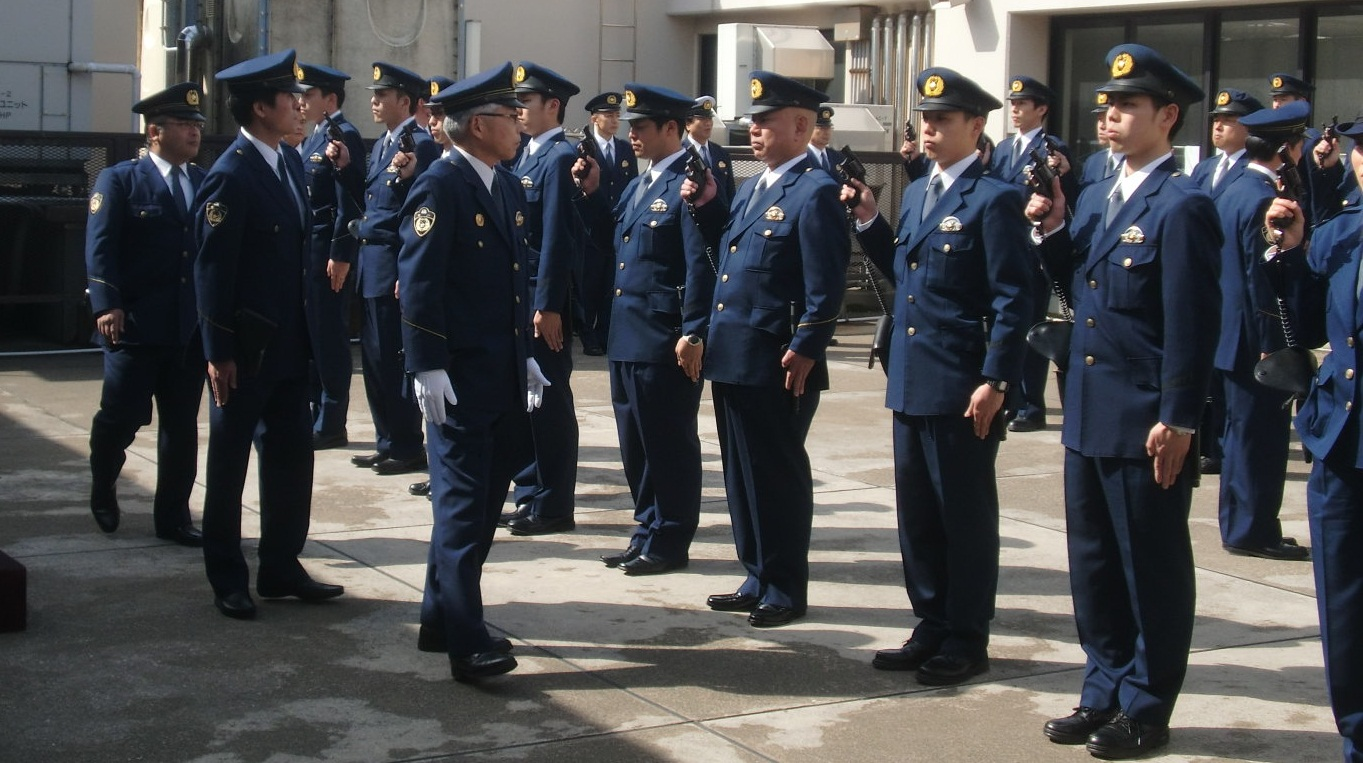
Police officers with standard uniforms and revolvers

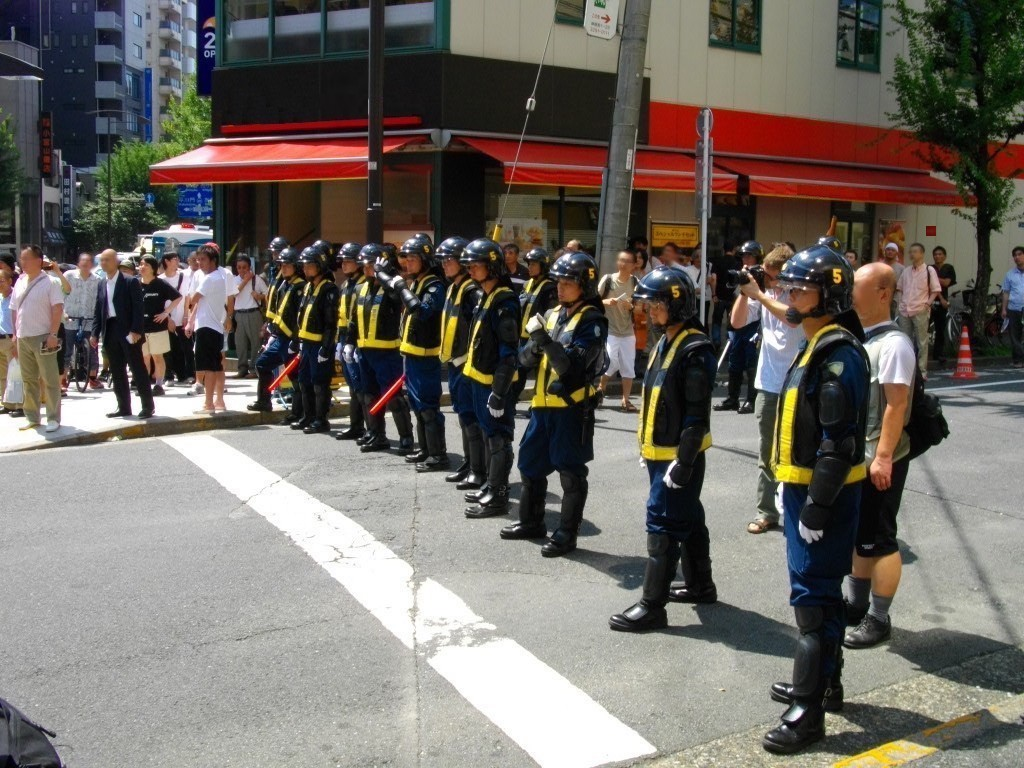
Riot police officers on crowd control duties

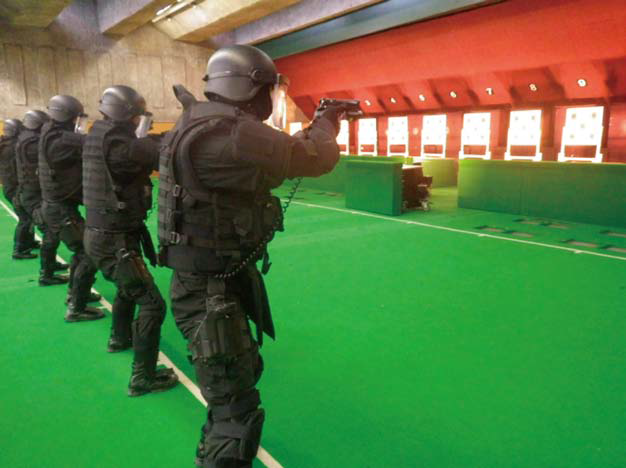
Special Investigation Team detectives training at a shooting range

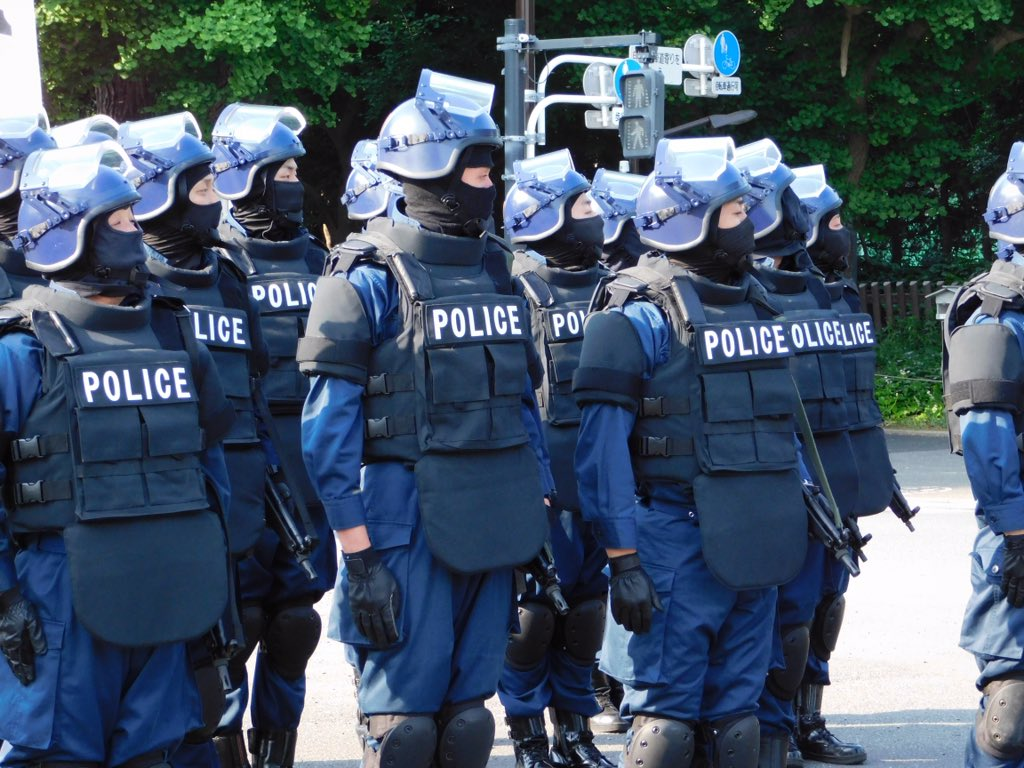
Anti-firearms officers in full gear

=== Uniform ===
In the pre-war period, police officers wore jackets with a stand-up collar. In 1946, the jacket was changed to four-buttons, open-collar style with vent and in 1950, a new police duty belt to wear gun and baton was adopted. But at this point, the uniforms of the National Rural Police and the municipal police differed in details.

During a reorganization in 1954, uniforms were to be unified across the country, but because that would take time, only the class chapter was unified at this time. After that, in 1956, a new uniform was adopted. The jacket became the turned-down collar style with three buttons, and the vent was done away with. Also, at this time, the summer clothes became grey, but in 1968 it was changed to greyish blue. On 1 April 1994, current uniform design was adopted across all of Japan.

Through the campaign against the Treaty of Mutual Cooperation and Security Between the United States and Japan at the end of the 1960s, helmets and protective gear for riot police officers were improved. On the other hand, general police officers were wearing blade-deflecting vests under uniforms so that they would not be noticeable, but since 2005, a strong stab vest to overlay on the uniform was adopted. And in the case of gun violence, bulletproof vests and helmets are also equipped. Ordinary police officers, riot police officers, SWAT detectives, and counter-terrorism operators use different vests of different standards.

=== Service weapon ===
In the pre-war period, most Japanese law enforcement officials only had a sabre. Only some elite detectives, bodyguards, or tactical units such as the Emergency Service Unit of the TMPD were issued pistols. The FN Model 1910 or Colt Model 1903 were used for open-carry uses, and Colt Model 1908 Vest Pocket or FN M1905 for concealed carry. During the Occupation, the Supreme Commander for the Allied Powers suggested them to be equipped with firearms. Because of the insufficient stocks and lack of domestically produced handguns, Japanese police started to receive service pistols leased from the Allies from 1949, and by 1951, all officers were issued pistols.

In the beginning, the makes and models of these sidearms varied, but M1911 pistols and M1917 revolvers, Smith & Wesson Military & Police and Colt Official Police were issued as the mostly standard sidearms. The .38 calibre revolvers were well-received, but .45 calibre handguns were too large to carry for somewhat small officers, especially women. And M1917 revolvers in particular were obsolete, deteriorated significantly, and so malfunction or reduced accuracy had been a problem. As a response to these issues, the National Rural Police Headquarters started to import small .38 Special calibre revolvers such as Smith & Wesson Chiefs Special and Colt Detective Special. During the 1960s, procurement began to migrate to the domestic Minebea "New Nambu" M60. When the production of the M60 was completed in the 1990s, deployment of small semi-automatic pistols was considered, but this plan was abandoned after small numbers of SIG Sauer P230 were deployed. Finally, imports from the United States were resumed, with S&W M37 and M360 revolvers having been purchased for uniformed officers. Their duty ammo is the Remington 158 grain lead round nose. And some elite detectives, bodyguards, or counter-terrorism units such as the Special Assault Team being equipped with 9×19mm Parabellum calibre semi-automatic pistols such as the Heckler & Koch USP.

From sometime in the 1970s, the Special Armed Police (ancestor of the Special Assault Team of the TMPD) introduced Heckler & Koch MP5A5/SD6/K submachine guns. From 2002, local counter-terrorism units (anti-firearms squads) were started to be equipped with MP5F, and there are also assault rifles in the SAT and urban AFS units. Tactical units of crime branches (Special Investigation Team of the TMPD, for example) also introduced a semi-automatic pistol-caliber carbine variant of MP5K (unofficially called the MP5SFK).

Initially, the sniper team was established in the 1960s, the Howa Golden Bear (original model of the Weatherby Vanguard) has been used as a sniper rifle, then, it has been updated to the Howa M1500. In the Special Assault Teams, Heckler & Koch PSG1 and L96A1 also been deployed.

For Japanese police, service pistols are generally left at work when they are not on duty.

=== Transportation ===
==== Ground ====
In Japan, there are about 40,000 police vehicles nationwide with the most common patrol cruisers being Toyota Crowns, Subaru Legacys and similar large sedans, although small compact and micro "keI" cars are used by rural police boxes and in city centers where they are much more maneuverable. Pursuit vehicles depend on prefectures with the Honda NSX, Subaru Impreza, Subaru Legacy, Mitsubishi Lancer, Nissan Skyline, Mazda RX-7, and Nissan Fairlady Z are all used in various prefectures for highway patrols and pursuit uses.

With the exception of unmarked vehicles, all PPHs vehicles are painted and marked in the same ways. Ordinary police vehicles are painted black and white with the upper parts of the vehicle painted white. Motorcycles are usually all white. Vehicles for riot police units are painted blue and white, and especially vehicles for the Rescue Squads of the TMPD are painted green and white.

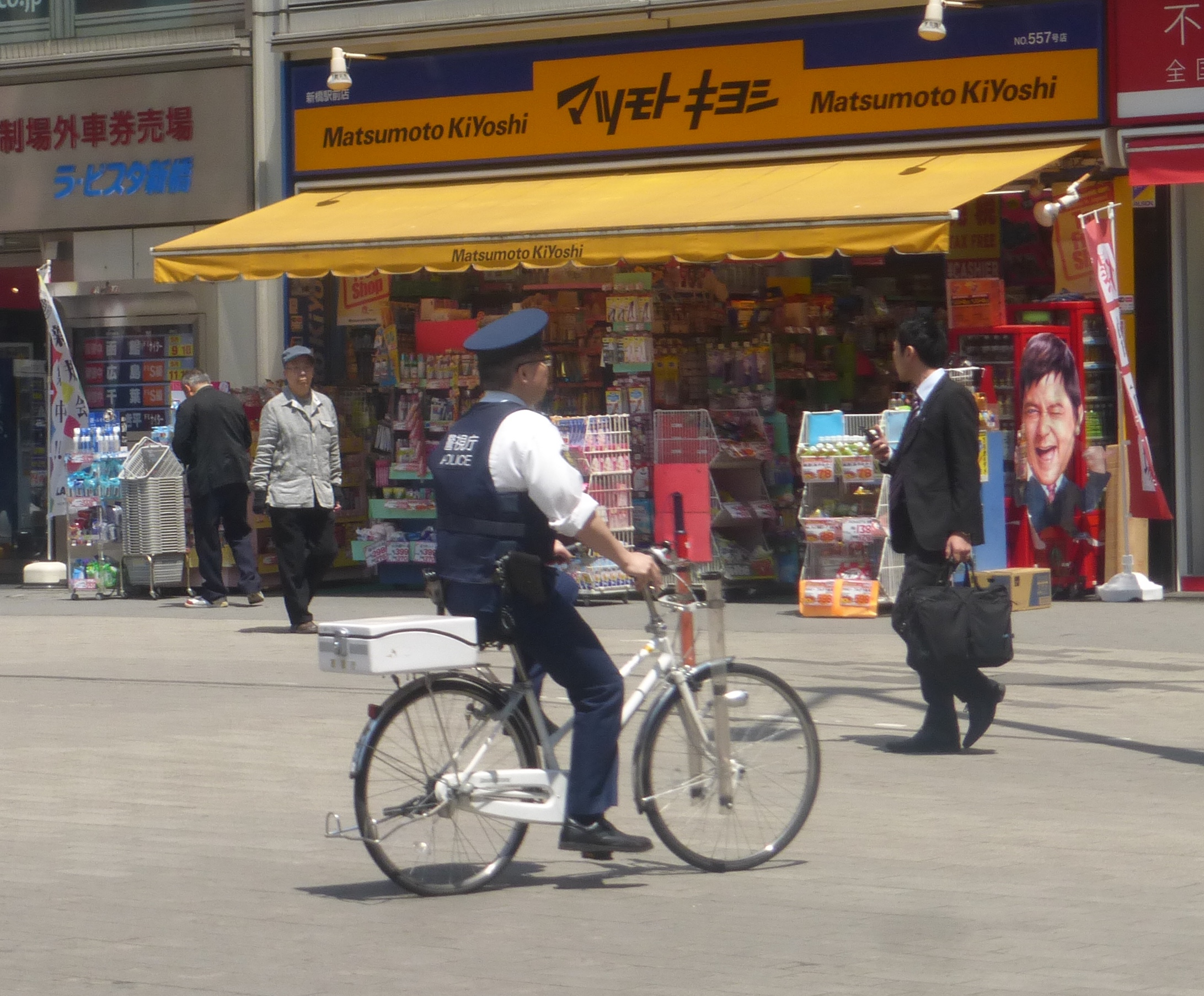
Police bicycle

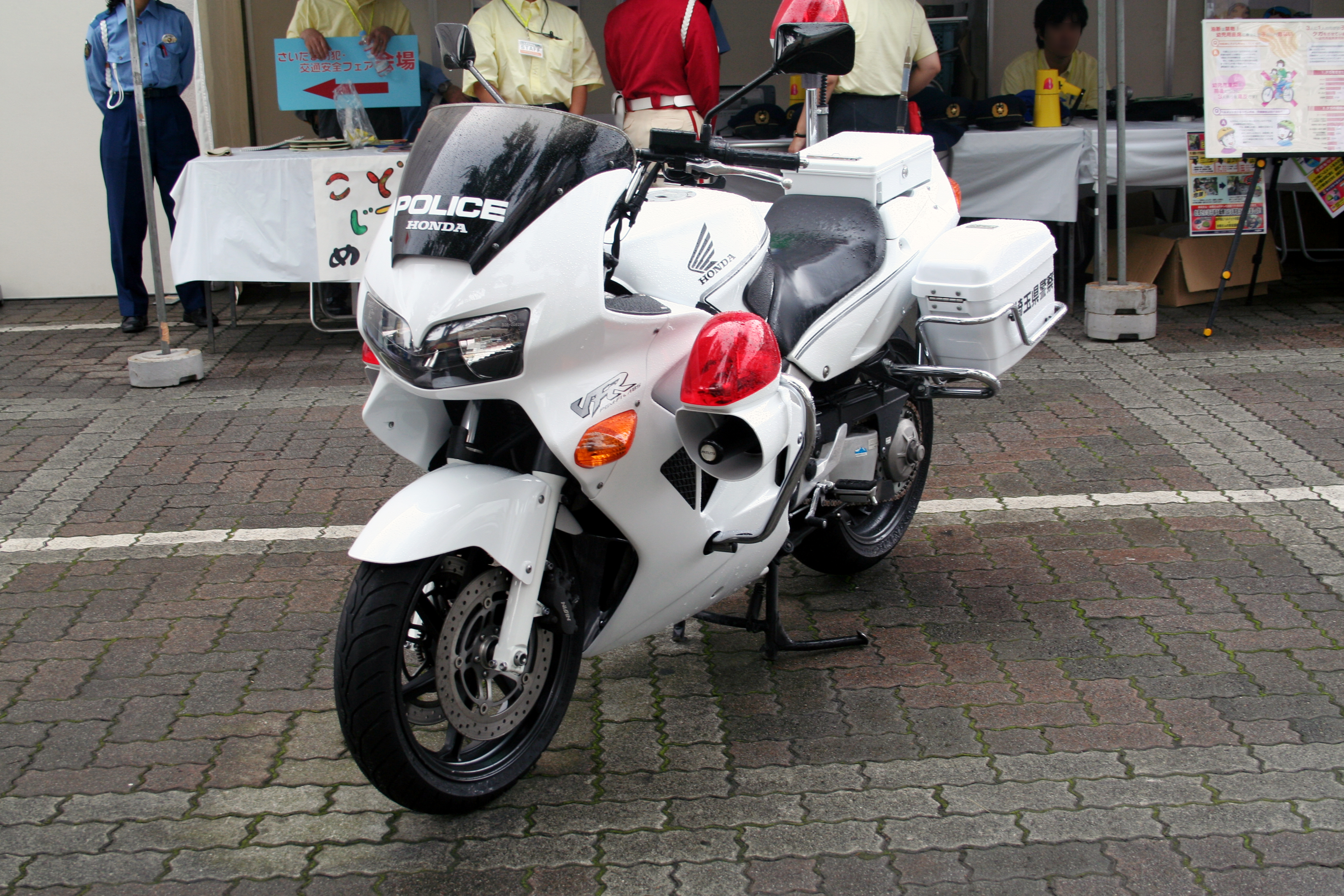
Honda VFR800P: Police motorcycle

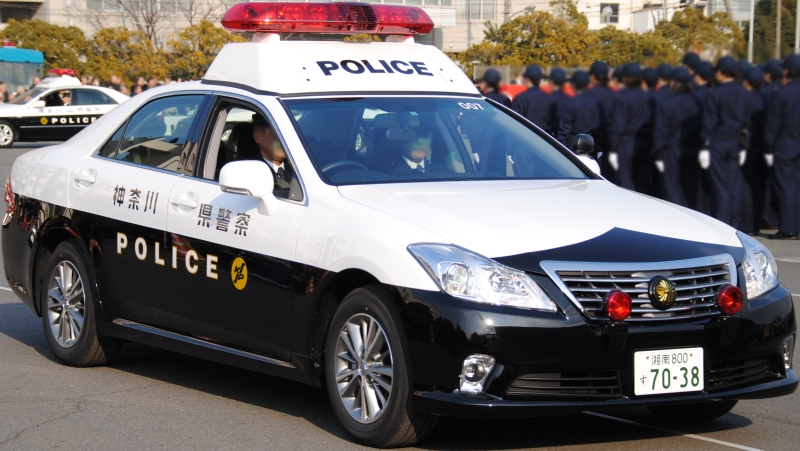
Toyota Crown: Radio mobile patrol (Note: Official name is Keira-you-musen-jidōsha (警ら用無線自動車).)

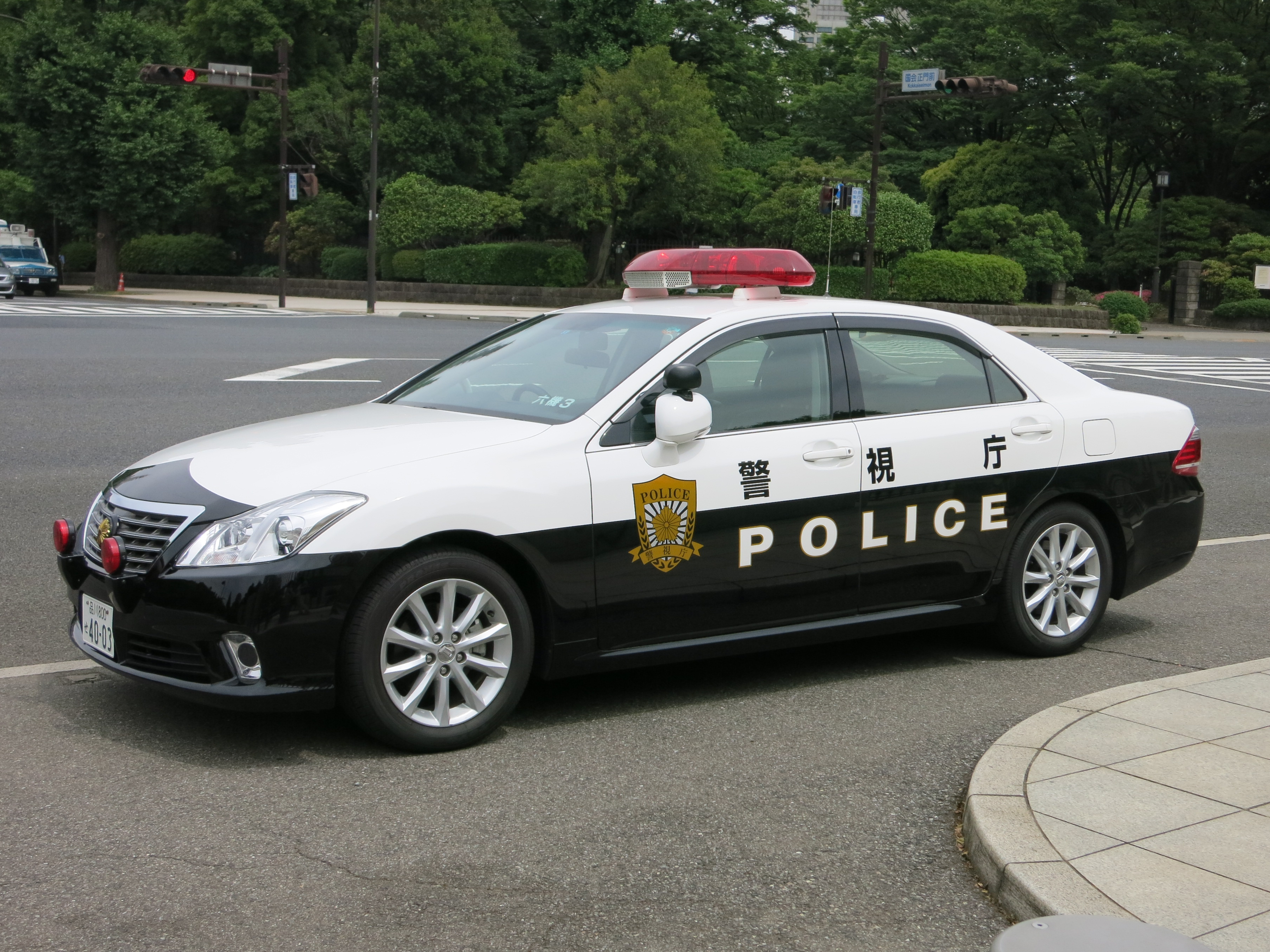
Toyota Crown: Mobile traffic patrol (Note: Official name is Kōtsu-torishimari-you-yonrinsha (交通取締用四輪車).)

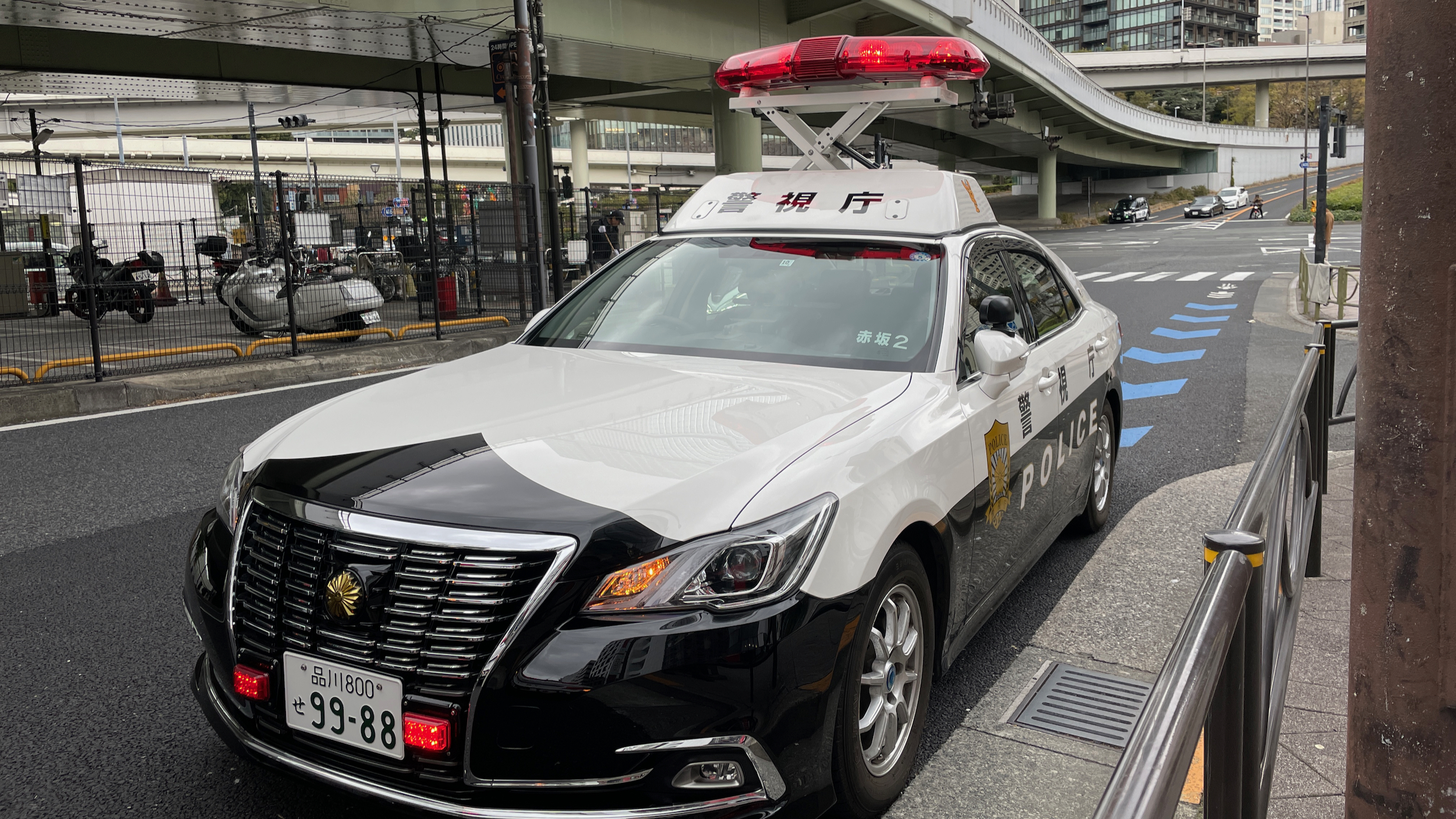
Crown with light bar raised for greater visibility.

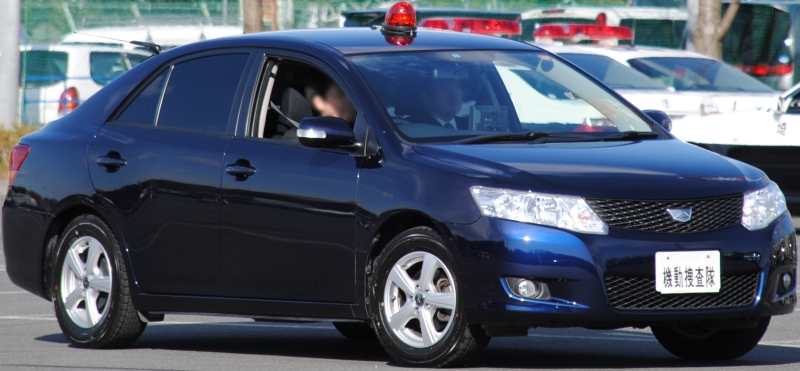
Toyota Allion: Unmarked car for MIU

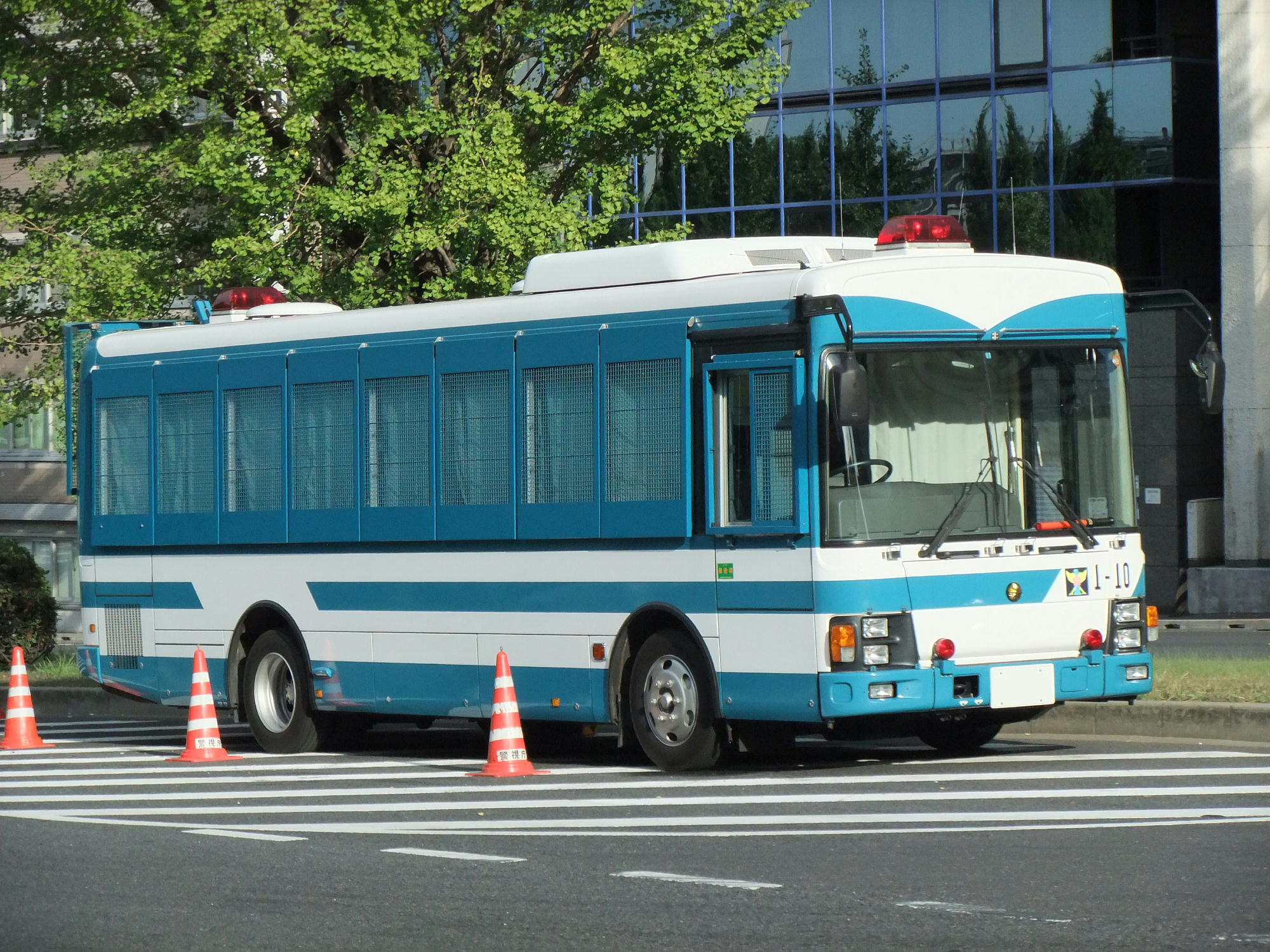
Isuzu Erga Mio: Police bus (Note: Official name is Ōgata-yusō-sha (大型輸送車), mainly used as troop transportation.)

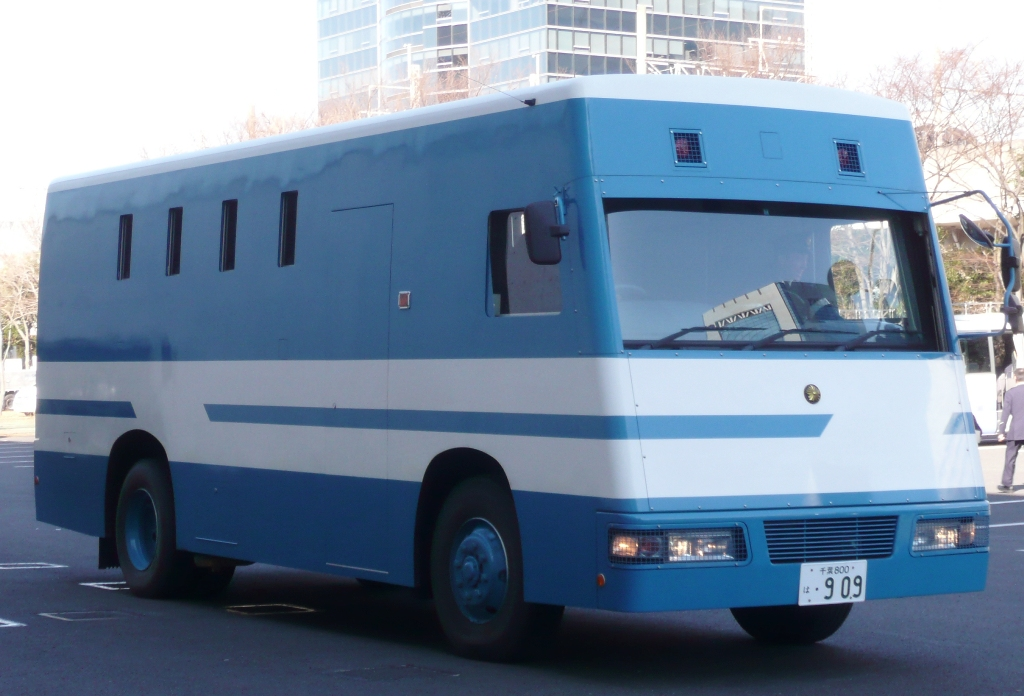
Isuzu Giga: Armoured bus (Note: Official name is Jōchū-keibi-sha (常駐警備車), mainly used as mobile barriers and shelters for police units.)

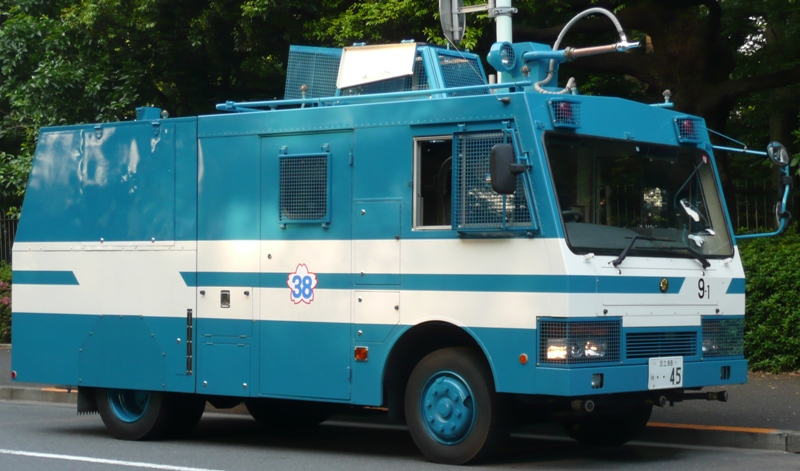
Mitsubishi Fuso Fighter: Mobile water cannon vehicle

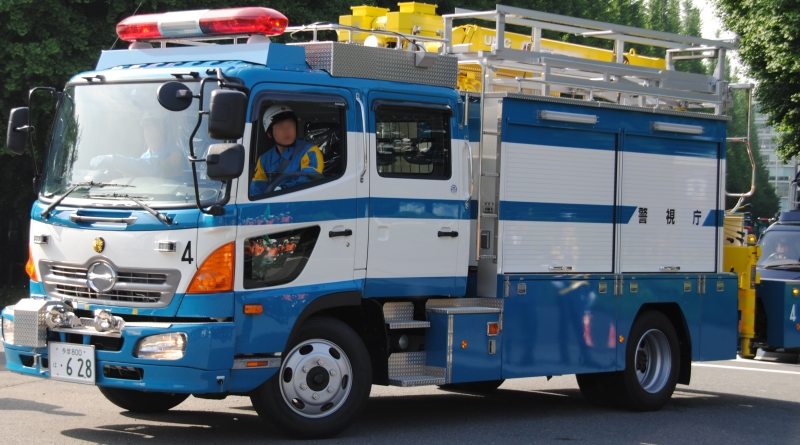
Hino Ranger: Heavy rescue vehicle

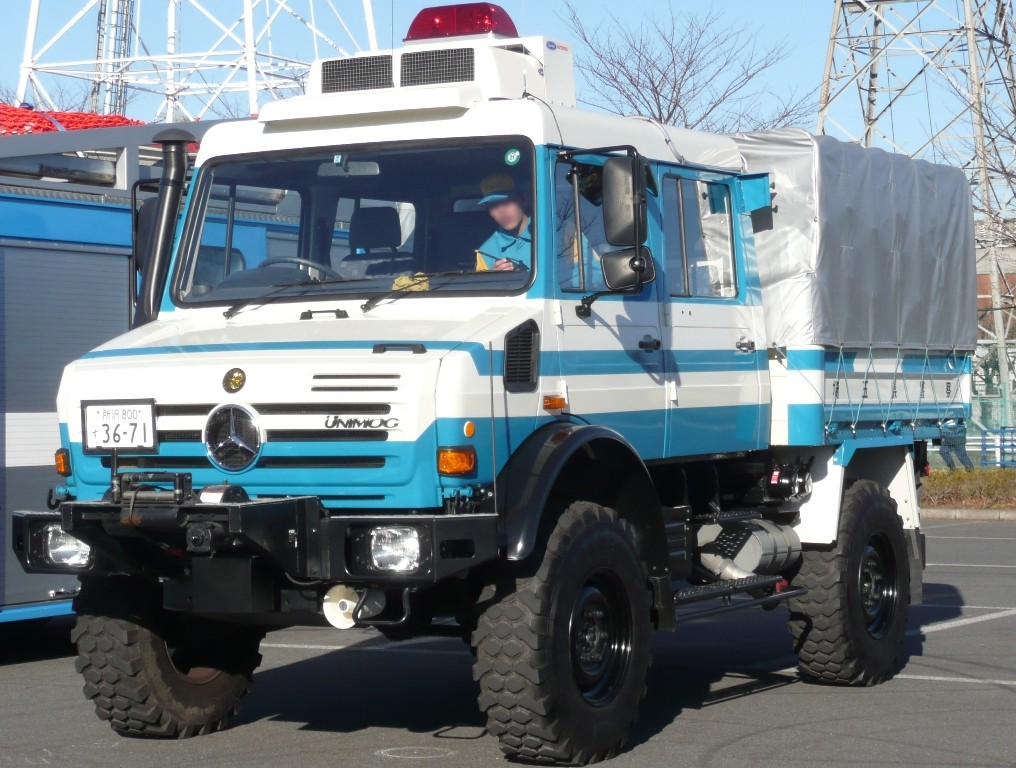
Unimog: Off-road emergency vehicle (Note: Official name is Tamokuteki-saigai-katudou-sha (多目的災害活動車).)

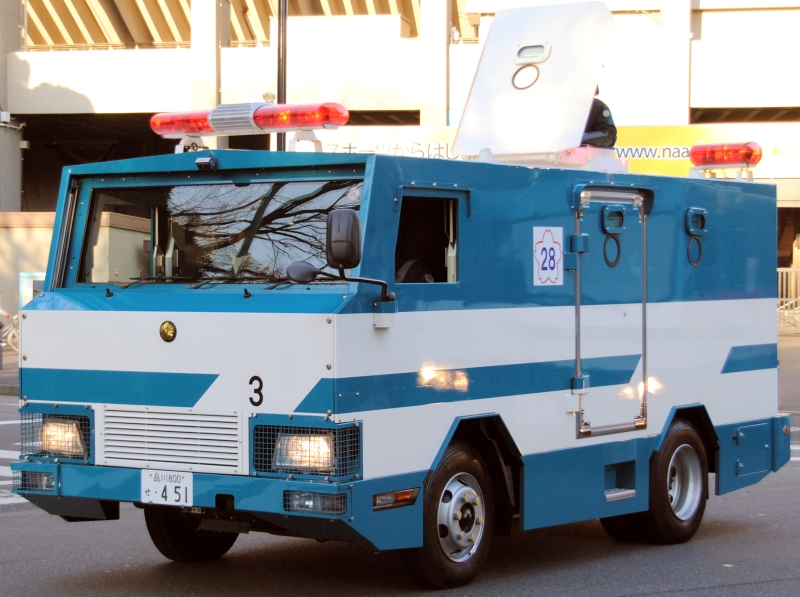
Mitsubishi Fuso Canter: SWAT vehicle (Note: Official name is Tokugata-keibi-sha (特型警備車).)

==== Aviation ====
In Japan, the deployment of police helicopters began in 1960. They are extensively used for traffic reporting, searches for suspects, search and rescue, airlift, and other missions. Approximately 80 police helicopters are operated nationwide. Some helicopters are equipped with stabilised TV camera and microwave link systems.

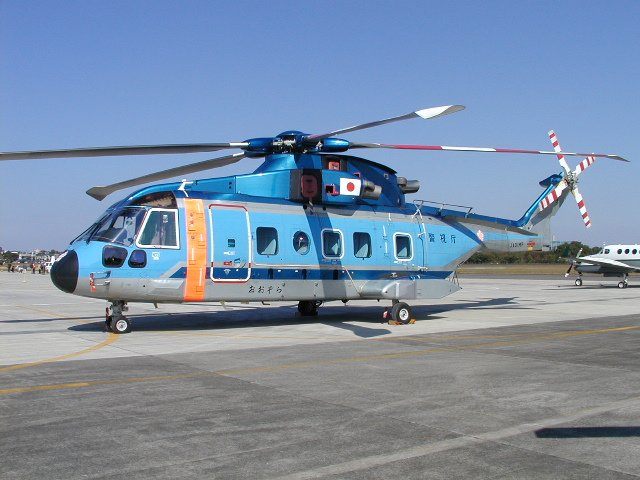
AgustaWestland EH101, TMPD

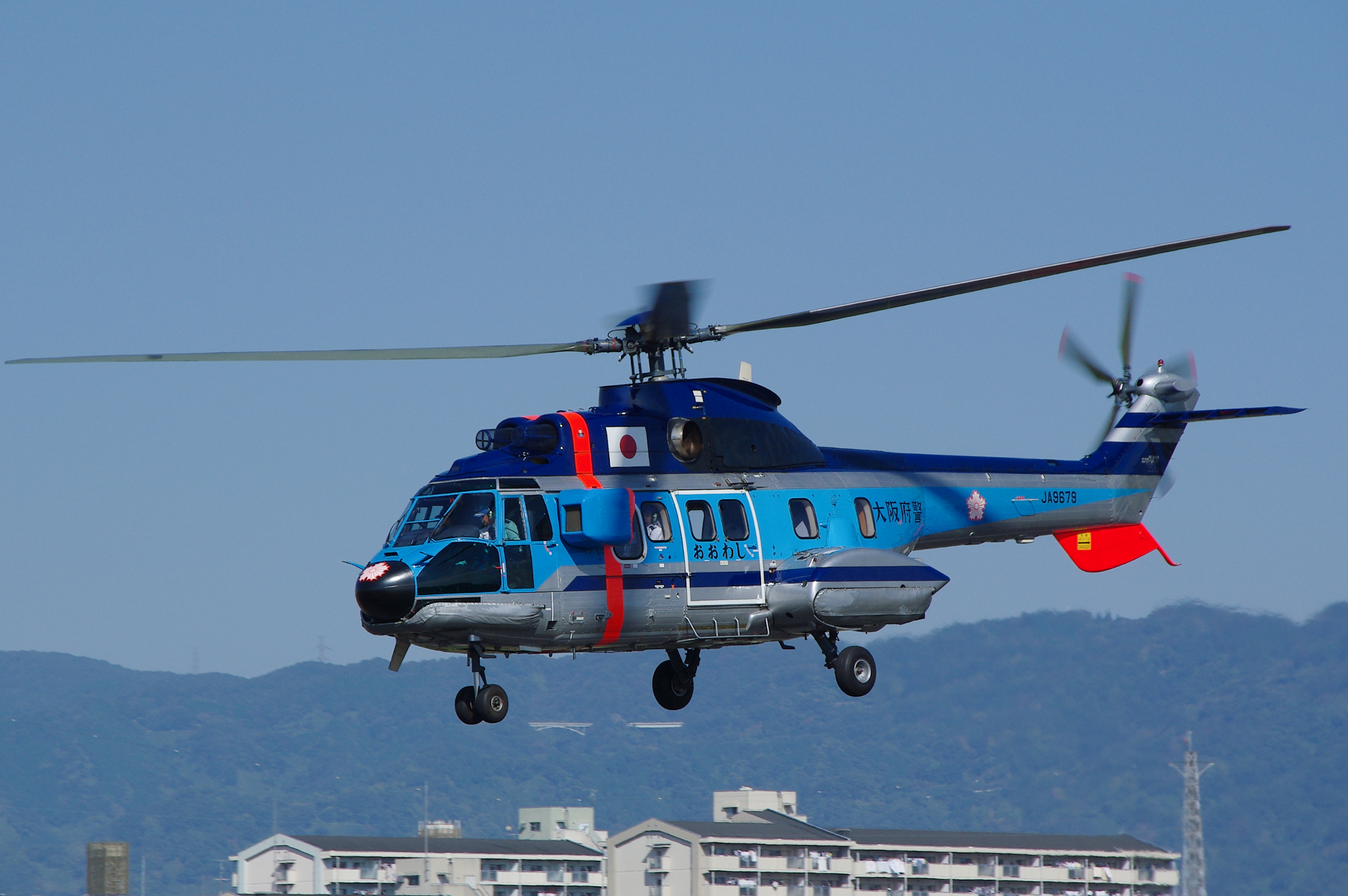
Aérospatiale AS332L1, Osaka PPH

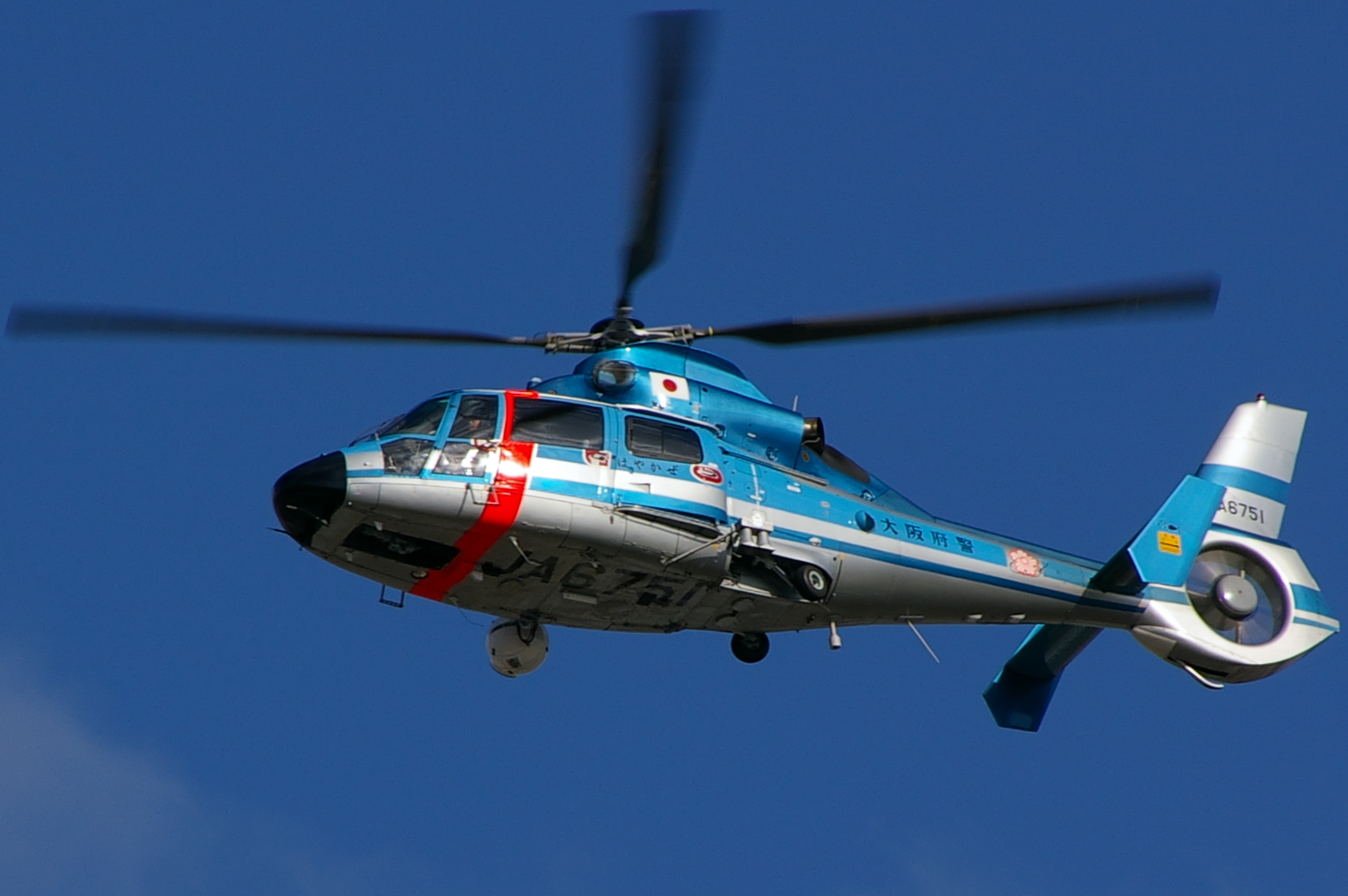
Eurocopter AS365 N2, Osaka PPH

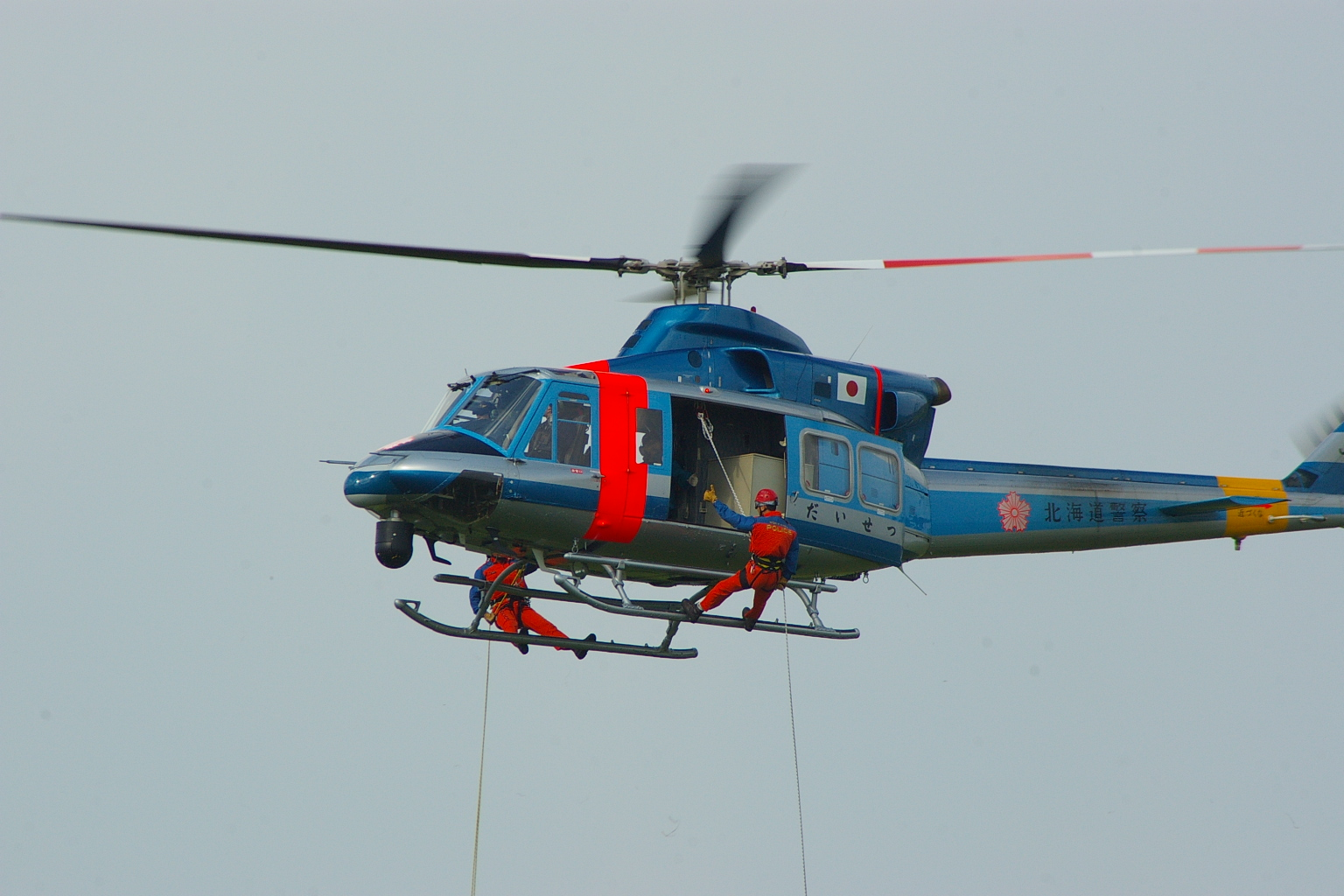
Bell 412EP, Hokkaidō PPH

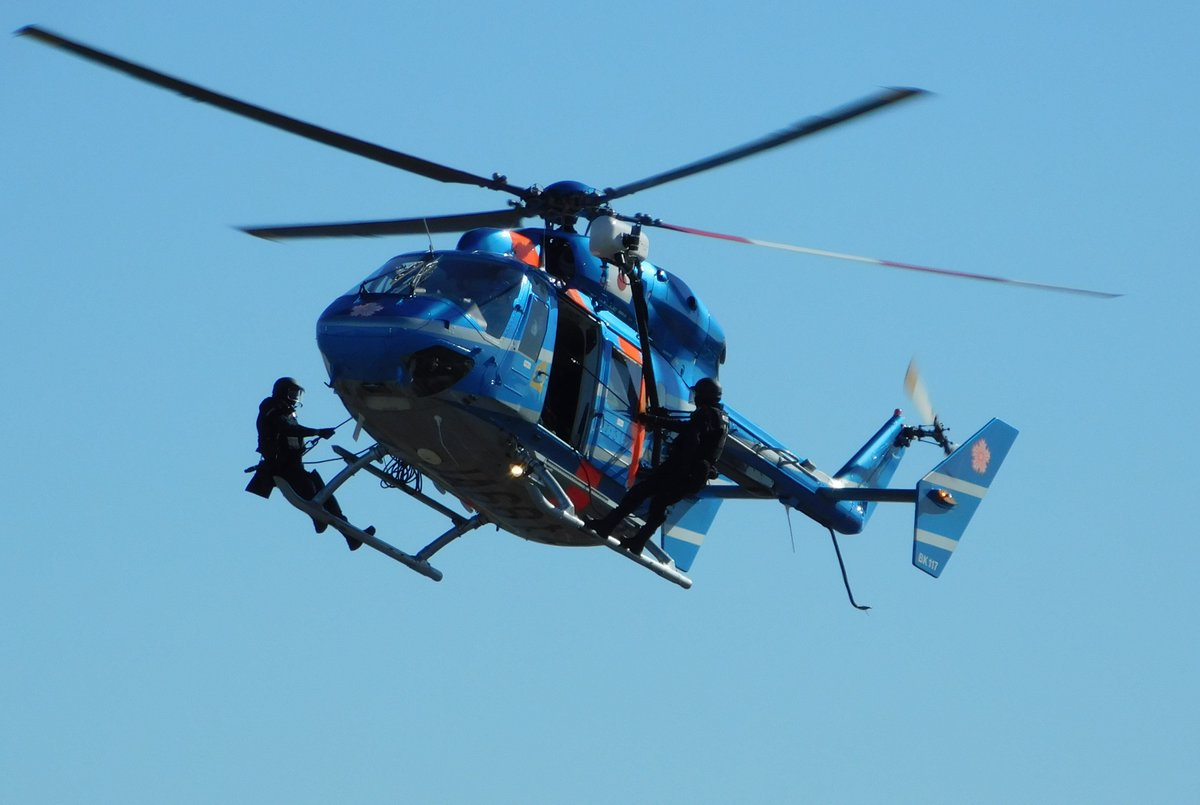
MBB/Kawasaki BK 117, Saitama PPH

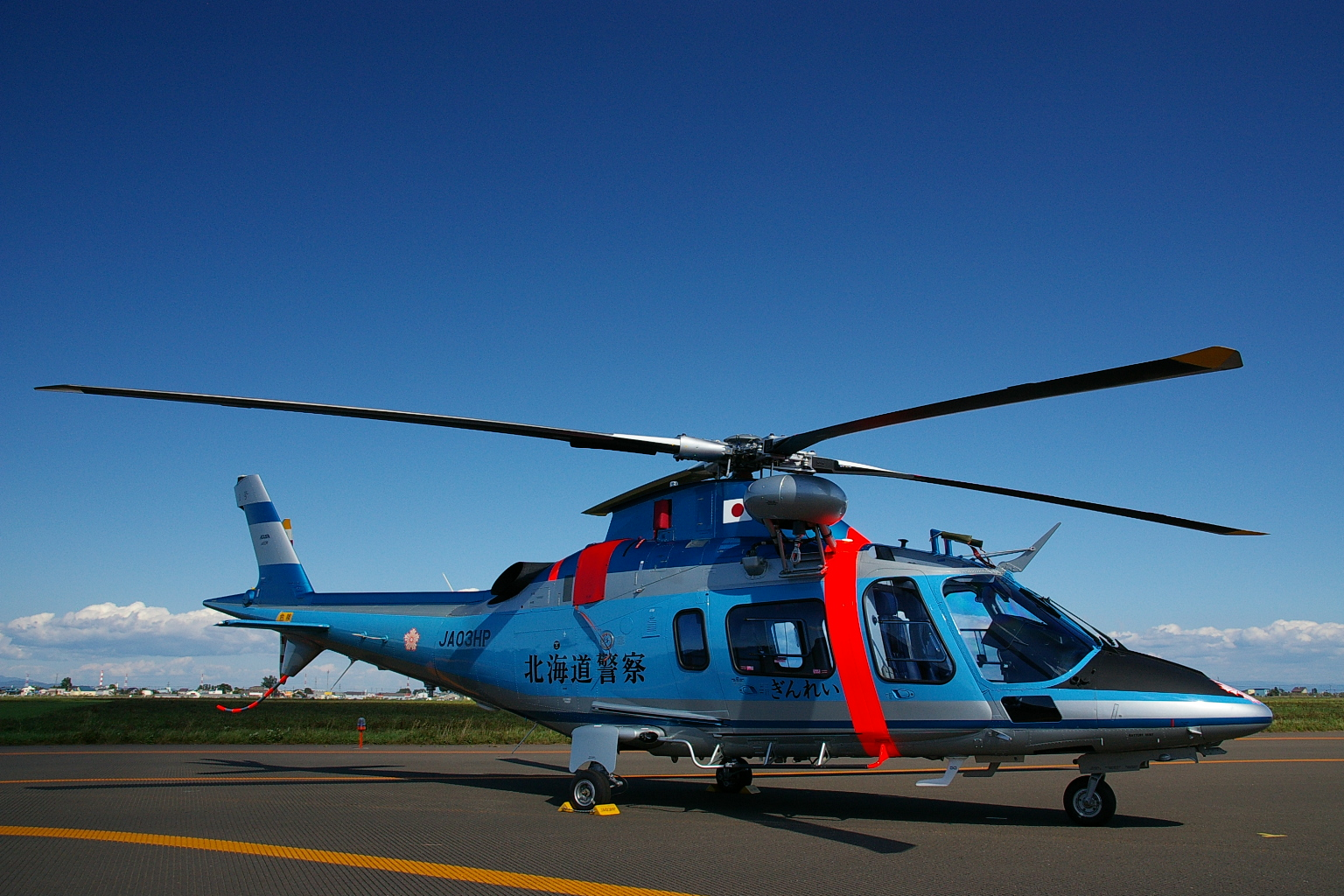
Agusta A109E, Hokkaidō PPH

==== Watercraft ====
Police watercraft of Japan are divided into five groups: 23-meter type, 20-meter type, 17-meter type, 12-meter type, 8-meter type. As of 2014, 159 vessels are deployed nationwide. Since the Japan Coast Guard is in charge of law enforcement outside ports, police watercraft are primarily used to patrol ports and rivers, though they are sometimes also used to assist land-based units or patrol islands.

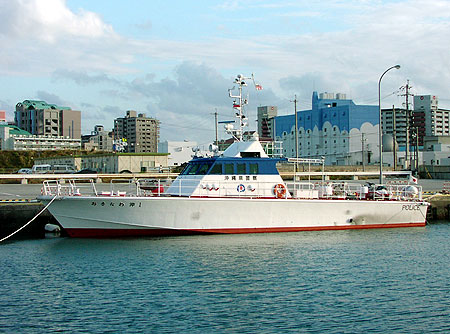
23-meter type (Okinawa of the Okinawa PPH)

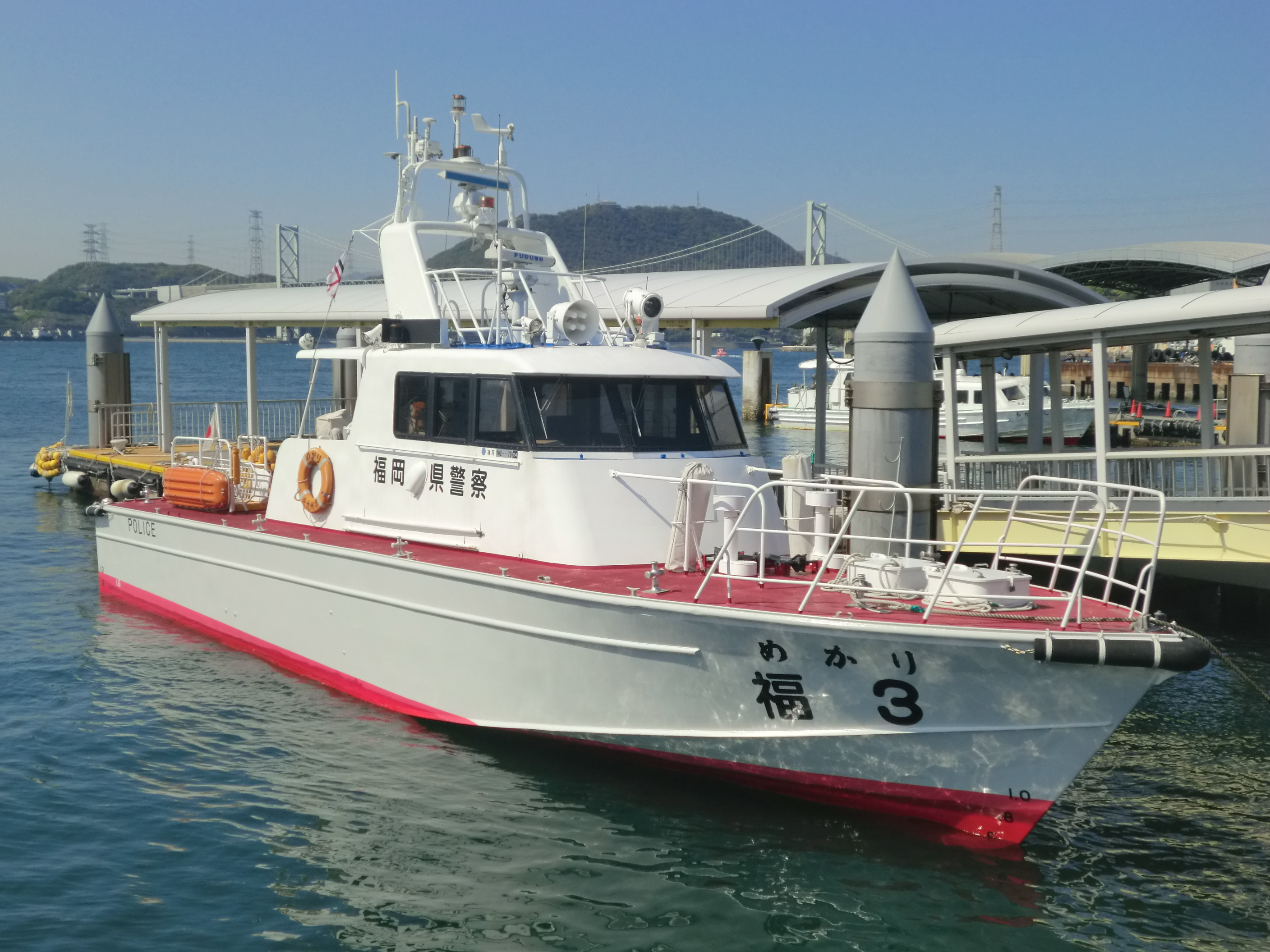
17-meter type (Mekari of the Fukuoka PPH)

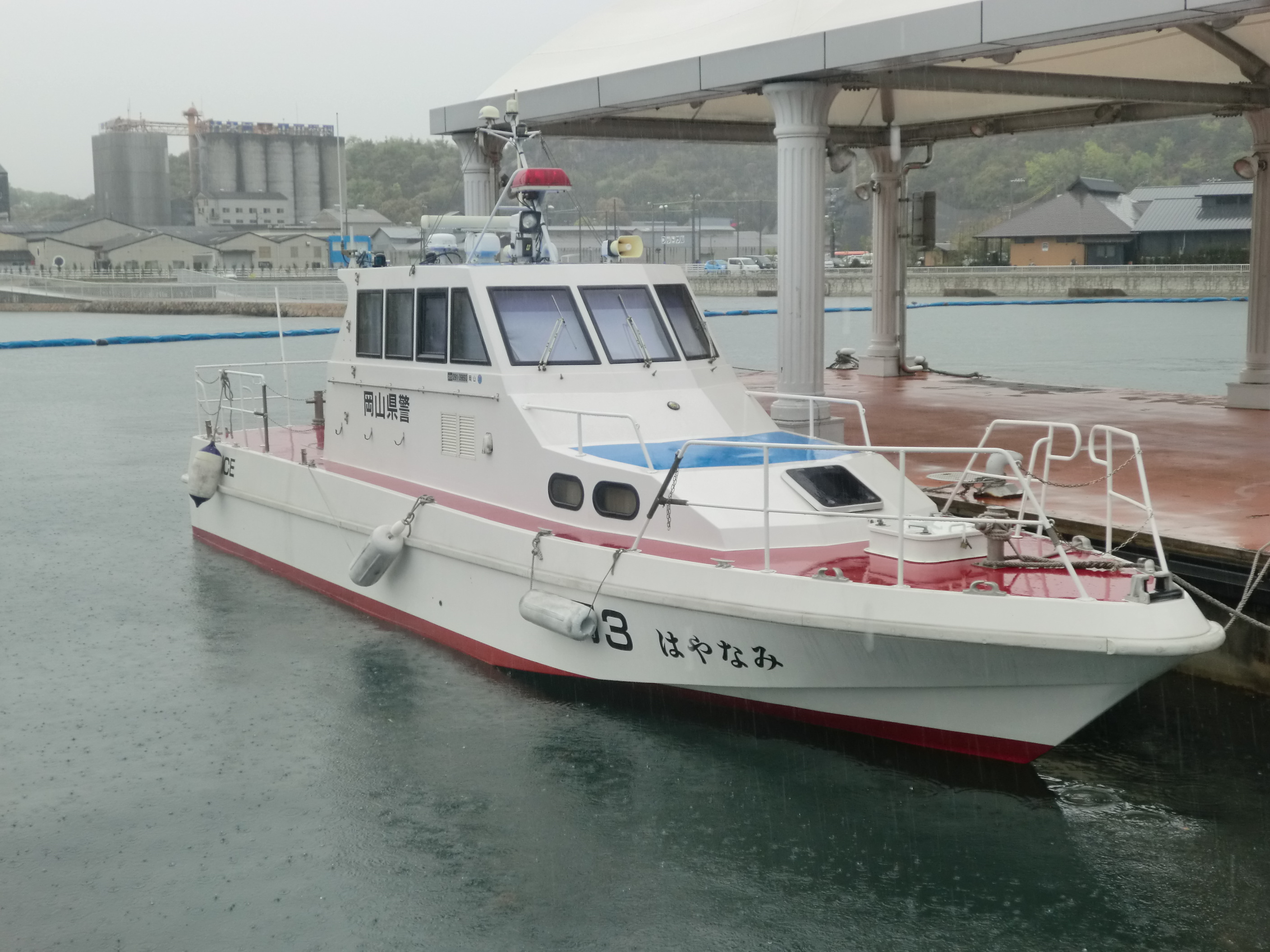
12-meter type (Hayanami of the Okayama PPH)

== List of prefectural police departments ==
All Prefectural Police Headquarters, except for the Hokkaidō Prefectural Police Department (due to the prefecture's large size) and the Tokyo Metropolitan Police Department (due to the Tokyo's special status as the capital), are under the central coordination for operations monitoring and wide area investigation by the Regional Police Bureaus (管区警察局, Kanku Keisatsu-kyoku) of the National Police Agency:

- Hokkaidō Prefectural Police Department (北海道警察, Hokkaidō-keisatsu)
- Tokyo Metropolitan Police Department (警視庁, Keishi-chō)
- Tōhoku Regional Police Bureau (東北管区警察局, Tōhoku Kanku Keisatsu-kyoku)
  - Aomori Prefectural Police Department (青森県警察, Aomori-ken-keisatsu)
  - Iwate Prefectural Police Department (岩手県警察, Iwate-ken-keisatsu)
  - Miyagi Prefectural Police Department (宮城県警察, Miyagi-ken-keisatsu)
  - Akita Prefectural Police Department (秋田県警察, Akita-ken-keisatsu)
  - Yamagata Prefectural Police Department (山形県警察, Yamagata-ken-keisatsu)
  - Fukushima Prefectural Police Department (福島県警察, Fukushima-ken-keisatsu)
- Kantō Regional Police Bureau (関東管区警察局, Kantō Kanku Keisatsu-kyoku)
  - Ibaraki Prefectural Police Department (茨城県警察, Ibaraki-ken-keisatsu)
  - Tochigi Prefectural Police Department (栃木県警察, Tochigi-ken-keisatsu)
  - Gunma Prefectural Police Department (群馬県警察, Gunma-ken-keisatsu)
  - Saitama Prefectural Police Department (埼玉県警察, Saitama-ken-keisatsu)
  - Chiba Prefectural Police Department (千葉県警察, Chiba-ken-keisatsu)
  - Kanagawa Prefectural Police Department (神奈川県警察, Kanagawa-ken-keisatsu)
  - Niigata Prefectural Police Department (新潟県警察, Niigata-ken-keisatsu)
  - Yamanashi Prefectural Police Department (山梨県警察, Yamanashi-ken-keisatsu)
  - Nagano Prefectural Police Department (長野県警察, Nagano-ken-keisatsu)
  - Shizuoka Prefectural Police Department (静岡県警察, Shizuoka-ken-keisatsu)
- Chūbu Regional Police Bureau (中部管区警察局, Chūbu Kanku Keisatsu-kyoku)
  - Toyama Prefectural Police Department (富山県警察, Toyama-ken-keisatsu)
  - Ishikawa Prefectural Police Department (石川県警察, Ishikawa-ken-keisatsu)
  - Fukui Prefectural Police Department (福井県警察, Fukui-ken-keisatsu)
  - Gifu Prefectural Police Department (岐阜県警察, Gifu-ken-keisatsu)
  - Aichi Prefectural Police Department (愛知県警察, Aichi-ken-keisatsu)
  - Mie Prefectural Police Department (三重県警察, Mie-ken-keisatsu)
- Kinki Regional Police Bureau (近畿管区警察局, Kinki Kanku Keisatsu-kyoku)
  - Shiga Prefectural Police Department (滋賀県警察, Shiga-ken-keisatsu)
  - Kyoto Prefectural Police Department (京都府警察, Kyoto-fu-keisatsu)
  - Osaka Prefectural Police Department (大阪府警察, Osaka-fu-keisatsu)
  - Hyogo Prefectural Police Department (兵庫県警察, Hyogo-ken-keisatsu)
  - Nara Prefectural Police Department (奈良県警察, Nara-ken-keisatsu)
  - Wakayama Prefectural Police Department (和歌山県警察, Wakayama-ken-keisatsu)
- Chūgoku–Shikoku Regional Police Bureau (中国四国管区警察局, Chūgoku Shikoku Kanku Keisatsu-kyoku)
  - Tottori Prefectural Police Department (鳥取県警察, Tottori-ken-keisatsu)
  - Shimane Prefectural Police Department (島根県警察, Shimane-ken-keisatsu)
  - Okayama Prefectural Police Department (岡山県警察, Okayama-ken-keisatsu)
  - Hiroshima Prefectural Police Department (広島県警察, Hiroshima-ken-keisatsu)
  - Yamaguchi Prefectural Police Department (山口県警察, Yamaguchi-ken-keisatsu)
  - Tokushima Prefectural Police Department (徳島県警察, Tokushima-ken-keisatsu)
  - Kagawa Prefectural Police Department (香川県警察, Kagawa-ken-keisatsu)
  - Ehime Prefectural Police Department (愛媛県警察, Ehime-ken-keisatsu)
  - Kochi Prefectural Police Department (高知県警察, Kochi-ken-keisatsu)
- Kyūshū Regional Police Bureau (九州管区警察局, Kyūshū Kanku Keisatsu-kyoku)
  - Fukuoka Prefectural Police Department (福岡県警察, Fukuoka-ken-keisatsu)
  - Saga Prefectural Police Department (佐賀県警察, Saga-ken-keisatsu)
  - Nagasaki Prefectural Police Department (長崎県警察, Nagasaki-ken-keisatsu)
  - Kumamoto Prefectural Police Department (熊本県警察, Kumamoto-ken-keisatsu)
  - Oita Prefectural Police Department (大分県警察, Oita-ken-keisatsu)
  - Miyazaki Prefectural Police Department (宮崎県警察, Miyazaki-ken-keisatsu)
  - Kagoshima Prefectural Police Department (鹿児島県警察, Kagoshima-ken-keisatsu)
  - Okinawa Prefectural Police Department (沖縄県警察, Okinawa-ken-keisatsu)

== See also ==
- Media related to Prefectural police in Japan at Wikimedia Commons
