= Police services of the Empire of Japan =

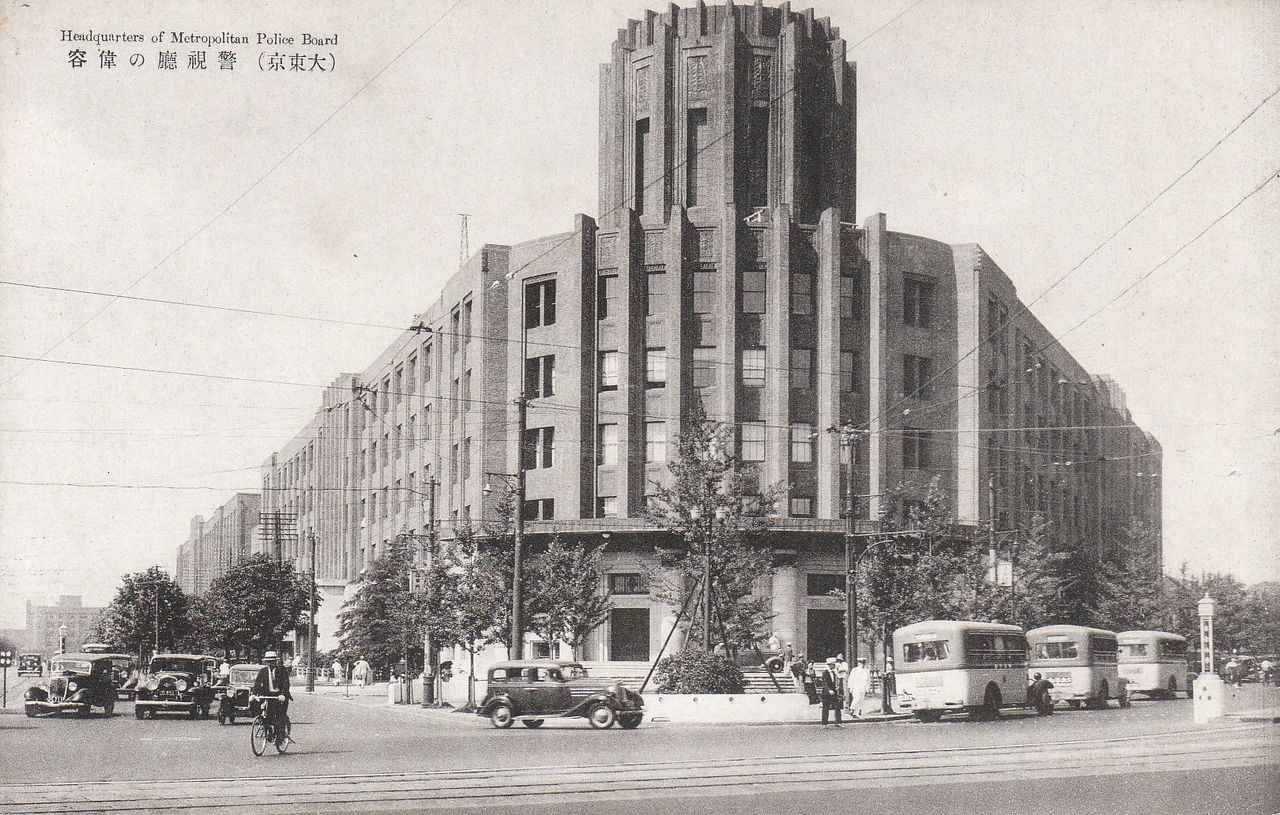
Tokyo Metropolitan Police Department Headquarters in 1931

The police system of the Empire of Japan comprised numerous police services, in many cases with overlapping jurisdictions.

== Background ==
During the Tokugawa bakufu (1603–1867), police functions in Japan operated through appointed town magistrates of samurai status, who served simultaneously as chiefs of police, prosecutors and judges.

These magistrates were assisted by a professional police-force led by officers who were also of samurai status. In turn, the samurai officers were assisted by deputized commoners known as jittemochi, who were granted powers of arrest.

The citizenry was organized into goningumi (Five-family associations), the forerunner of the tonarigumi, whose members had collective responsibility for the actions and activities of each one of their fellows.

The official formula used in feudal times to inform a subject that he had been placed under arrest was to simply shout Go'yō! (御用) - the expression also meant "Official business!" or "Clear the way!".

== History ==
=== Formation ===
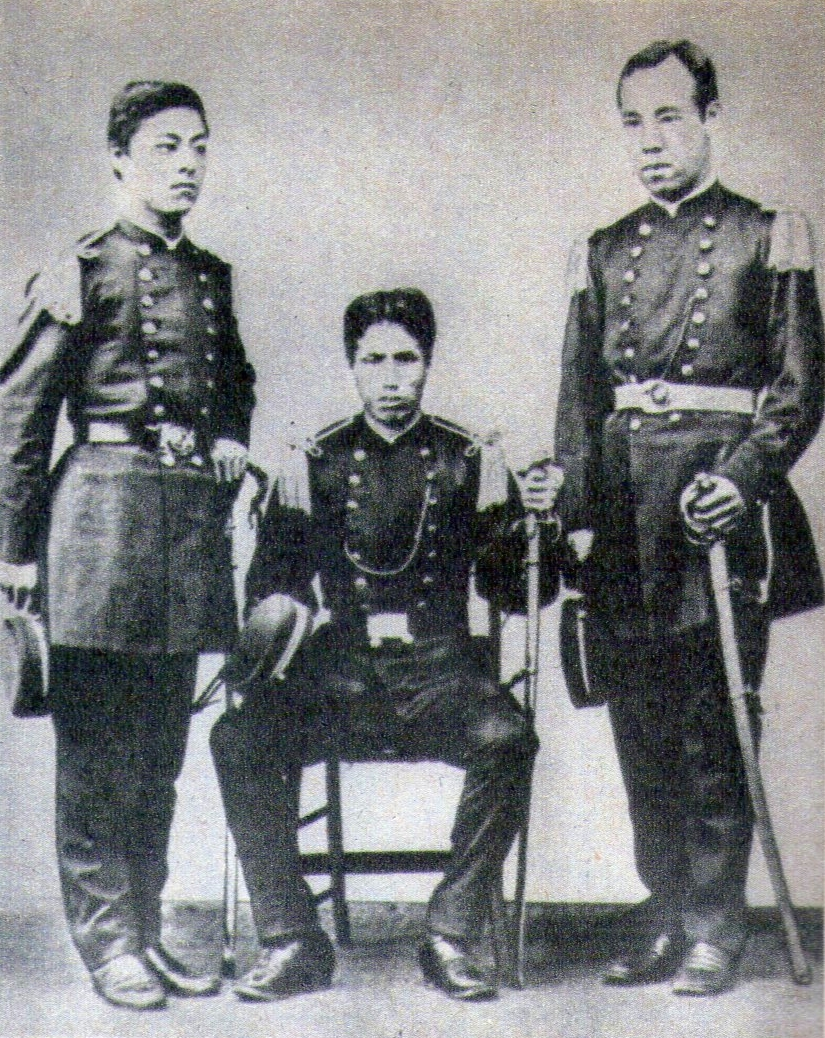
Japanese policeman circa 1872

As part of the modernization of Japan after the 1868 Meiji Restoration, the new Meiji government sent Kawaji Toshiyoshi on a tour of Western Europe in 1872 to study various law-enforcement systems.

Toshiyoshi returned impressed with the structure and techniques of the police forces of France's Third Republic and of Prussia as models for the new Japanese police system.

With the establishment of the Home Ministry in 1873, his recommendations were implemented, and civilian police powers became centralized at the national level, although implementation was delegated to the prefectural level.

Under the Home Ministry, the Police Affairs Bureau (警保局, Keiho-kyoku) also had quasi-judicial functions, including the power to issue ordinances and to regulate business licenses, construction permits, industrial safety and public-health issues, in addition to its criminal-investigation and public-order functions. The centralized police system steadily acquired extra functions, until it controlled almost all aspects of daily life, including fire prevention and the mediation of labor disputes.

During the Satsuma Rebellion of 1877, the lack of an organized, trained standing army forced the central government to use units from the police bureau as militia to suppress the uprising.

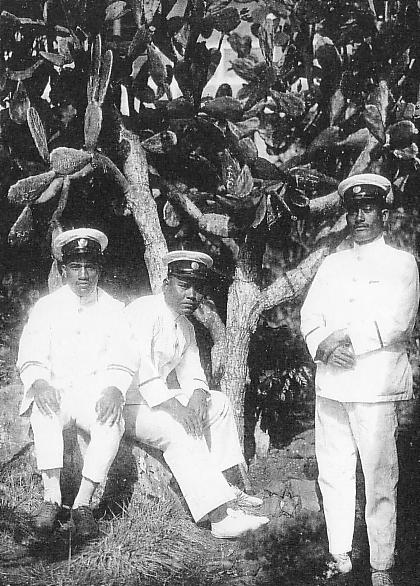
Native Austronesian constables (巡警) and teacher (助教員) on Truk Island, c. 1930.

After 1911, a separate department, the Special Higher Police (Tokko), was established specifically to deal with political crimes and counter-espionage. Similar to Special Branches in the later Commonwealth of Nations, the Tokko investigated and suppressed potentially subversive ideologies, including anarchism, communism, and socialism, as well as monitoring the growing foreign population within Japan. Its scope gradually increased to include members of shinshūkyō, Christians, pacifists, student activists, liberals, and ultra-rightists. The Tokko also regulated the content of motion pictures, political meetings, and election campaigns.

The military came under the police jurisdiction of the Kempeitai (founded in 1881) for the Imperial Japanese Army and the Tokkeitai (founded in 1942) for the Imperial Japanese Navy, although both military organizations had overlapping jurisdiction over the civilian population.

After the Manchurian Incident of 1931, military police assumed greater authority, leading to friction with their civilian counterparts.

After the start of the Second Sino-Japanese War in 1937, police regulated industry and commerce (to maximize the war effort and to prevent speculation and hoarding), mobilized labor, and controlled transportation.

The Tokyo metropolitan area came under the jurisdiction of the Teikoku Keishichō (帝國警視廳) or Keishichō, which was personally headed by Kawaji from 1874, and from which he could direct the organization of the national police system.

== Operations overseas ==
In the Shanghai International Settlement, the Japanese Consular Police was established and kept under the control of the Japanese consulate in order to apprehend Japanese wanted for crimes committed against the state.

Japan set up civil police services overseas (in Korea, Kwantung Leased Territory, Taiwan, Karafuto, some extraterritorial Japanese dependencies in Shanghai, Beijing and Tianjin before war started in mainland China).

From the 1930s period to the Pacific War of 1941–1945, other similar but "native" civil police-services operated in Manchukuo, Mengjiang and the Nanjing Nationalist Government.

The police and security services in the South Seas Mandate and occupied Pacific areas were the charge of the Tokeitai.

== Equipment ==
At the beginning of modern police systems, only senior officers were permitted to wear a sword, so most constables had only a baton. Then, in 1882, all officers started to be issued a sabre.

Only some elite detectives, bodyguards, or SWAT units such as the Special Security Unit of the TMPD were issued pistols. FN Model 1910 or Colt Model 1903 were used for open-carry uses, and FN M1905 or Colt Model 1908 Vest Pocket for concealed carry uses.

And in the border area like Karafuto Prefecture and Korea, there were some armed police units with military small arms.

== Controversies ==
The vague wording of the 1925 Peace Preservation Law gave all police organizations wide scope for interpretation of what constituted "criminal activity".

Under the guise of "maintenance of order", the police exercised broad powers of surveillance and arrest. Lack of accountability and a tradition of "guilty until proven innocent" led to many of the brutalities carried out by the police forces.

In rural areas especially, the police had great authority and were accorded the same mixture of fear and respect as the village head.

The increasing involvement of the police in political affairs was one of the foundations of the authoritarian state in Japan in the first half of the twentieth century.

== Aftermath ==
After Japan surrendered in 1945, the American occupation authorities retained the prewar police structure pending the implementation of a new system.

The Diet of Japan passed the 1947 Police Law to set up new decentralized systems: municipal police services (自治体警察, Jichitai Keisatsu) and the National Rural Police (国家地方警察, Kokka Chihō Keisatsu).

But this system did not match the Japanese national situation, so a complete restructuring ushered in a more centralized system with the National Police Agency and prefectural police departments under the 1954 amended Police Law.

== See also ==
- Kempeitai
- Tokeitai
- Special Higher Police
- Tokyo Metropolitan Police Department
- Law enforcement in Japan
- National Police Agency
