= Tokkeitai =

Tokkeitai （特警隊） may refer to:

- Tokubetsu Keisatsutai, military police of the Imperial Japanese Navy until the end of World War II
- Tokubetsu-keibi-tai (Metropolitan Police Department), an Emergency Service Unit of the Tokyo Metropolitan Police Department prior to World War II
- Tokubetsu-keibi-tai (Imperial Guard), a rapid reaction force of the Japanese Imperial Guard
- Special Boarding Unit, a special forces unit of the Japan Maritime Self-Defense Force, established in 2001
