= National Police Agency Security Bureau =

Branch of the National Police Agency

The National Police Agency Security Bureau (警察庁警備局, Keisatsu-chō Keibi-kyoku) is a bureau of the National Police Agency in charge of national-level internal security affairs.

It supervises the Security Bureau and the Public Security Bureau of the Tokyo Metropolitan Police Department, and Security departments of other Prefectural police headquarters for those issues.

The current chief of the Security Bureau is Hiroki Tsutsui.

== Organization ==
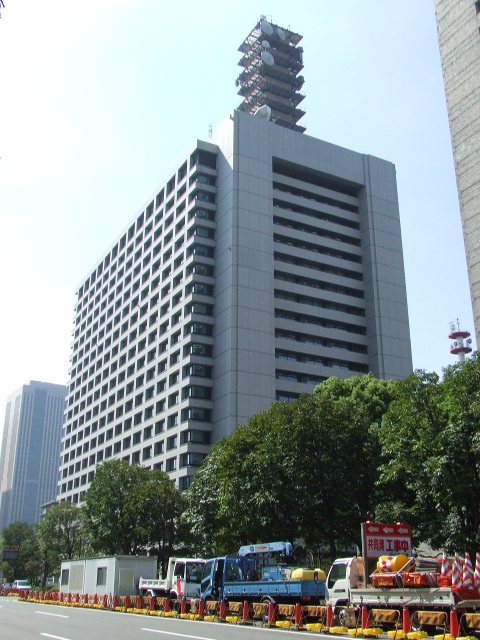
The NPA SB is located at Central Government Building No.2.

Organization of the Security Bureau is as follows:

=== Security Department ===
The Security Department (警備部, Keibi-bu) is charged with internal counter-terrorism, countering cybercrime and surveillance of potentially threatening groups, organisations, and social phenomena. It's also tasked with providing close protection requirements to VIPs.

- Security Planning Division (警備企画課, Keibi Kikaku-ka)
  - Security Coordination Office
  - Image Data Analysis Office
  - Intelligence Coordination Analysis Office
  - Crisis Management Office
  - Cyber Attack Analysis Center
- Public Security Division (公安課, Kōan-ka)
  - Intelligence Countermeasure Office
  - Far-Left Countermeasure Office
  - Far-Right Countermeasure Office
  - Special Organized Crime Countermeasure Office

=== Foreign Affairs and Intelligence Department ===
The Foreign Affairs and Intelligence Department (外事情報部, Gaiji-jōhō-bu) is charged with counter-intelligence, and international counter-terrorism. It has a unit known as YAMA, which has access to classified information based on intercepts from various communications facilities.

- Foreign Affairs Division (外事課, Gaiji-ka)
  - Foreign Affairs Technical Investigation Office
  - Foreign Affairs Research Office
  - Foreign Affairs Special Case Countermeasure Office
  - Unauthorized Export Countermeasure Office
- Counter International Terrorism Division (国際テロリズム対策課, Kokusai Terorizumu Taisaku-ka)
  - Counter International Terrorism Countermeasure Office

=== Security Operations Department ===
The Security Operations Department (警備運用部, Keibi-unyō-bu) replaced the former Security Division (警備課, Keibi-ka) in 2019. It's mandated with security and protecting VIPs (1st Division) and response to large-scale disaster or terrorism (2nd Division).

- First Security Operations Division (警備第一課, Keibi Daiichi-ka)
- Second Security Operations Division (警備第二課, Keibi Daini-ka)

=== Training ===
Prospective SB officers are trained at the National Police Academy in intelligence gathering techniques.

== Bibliography ==
- Davies, Philip H.J.; Gustafson, Kristian, eds. (2013). Intelligence Elsewhere: Spies and Espionage Outside the Anglosphere. Georgetown University Press. ISBN 978-1589019560.
- Samuels, Richard J. (2019). Special Duty: A History of the Japanese Intelligence Community. Cornell University Press. ISBN 978-1501741586.
- Williams, Brad (2021). Japanese Foreign Intelligence and Grand Strategy: From the Cold War to the Abe Era. Georgetown University Press. ISBN 978-1647120634.
