= Superintendent general =

Police rank that used in Asian countries

Superintendent general is a senior rank in police forces used in Croatia, South Korea, Japan, and Macau.

== Japan ==
In Japan, those people with this rank are the chief of police of the Tokyo Metropolitan Police Department, and highest nationwide.

Japan

== South Korea ==
In South Korean police, the Superintendent General was lower than a senior superintendent general, and higher than senior superintendent. The police officers of this rank are deputy chief of local (provincial) police agency, and has six years to be promoted to the next rank.

South Korea
