= Emergency service unit =

Unit organized by emergency services to handle broader emergencies than usual

An emergency service unit (ESU), alternatively emergency service detail (ESD) or emergency service squad (ESS), is a type of unit within an emergency service, usually police, that is capable of responding to and handling a broader or more specific range of emergencies and calls for service than regular units within their organization, such as rescue, emergency management, and mass casualty incidents. They are similar to police tactical units, fire department technical rescue, and incident response teams in other emergency services and organizations, and often have similar or overlapping roles; the term is also used synonymously for these units, or as a catch-all for units that combine multiple disciplines and roles under one banner.

The term originated with the Emergency Service Unit of the New York City Police Department, which handles emergencies ranging from tactical responses and K-9 deployments to technical rescue, and even emergency medicine.

== Structure ==
An ESU operates at the direction of the command staff and responds to emergency and high-risk situations that occur outside the scope of duties of responding patrol and criminal investigation units. ESU members train continually both in-house and with other similar units and organizations across jurisdictions.

== Duties ==
In law enforcement, an ESU often provides services analogous to a police tactical unit, and in some police forces it may simply be the name of their tactical unit without any additional roles.

Some ESUs provide services typically handled by fire departments and emergency medical services, such as emergency medicine, technical rescue, search and rescue, and HAZMAT; however, as they are usually not intended to fully replace these services, in some cases they may be unable to provide the full extent of their services based on their roles or scope, such as being able to stabilize patients for further treatment but not fully treat their ailments, or being able to rescue victims from structural fires but not fight the fire itself to a significant extent.

ESUs are generally trained to handle multiple types of emergencies in various disciplines, particularly in specific situations such as basic firefighting, vehicle extrication, elevator rescue, urban search and rescue, diver rescue, battlefield medicine, and bomb disposal. As many ESUs are also in law enforcement or also serve as tactical units, they tend to also have training in firearms, tactical procedures, arrest procedures, de-escalation, door breaching, and combat.

== Equipment ==
ESU equipment can include: vehicle extrication tools, high-angle and low-angle rope and victim rescue equipment, SCUBA, forcible entry tools, lighting equipment, irritant chemical agents, HAZMAT detection instruments, HAZMAT PPE, HAZMAT decontamination, pneumatic breaching tools, water rescue gear, animal control tools, semi- and fully automatic firearms, ballistic gear, portable cutting and hand tools, high-energy hydraulic rescue tools, metal detectors, climbing gear, portable field lighting, small marine craft, firefighter protective clothing, basic life support (BLS) or advanced life support (ALS) equipment, as well as additional medical equipment.

== Response vehicles ==
ESU utilizes smaller patrol response vehicles which are supported by larger utility "rescue squad" type trucks. Smaller patrol ESU response vehicles can range from an SUV to a light or medium duty truck or van with a rear-mounted utility body. Larger ESU vehicles can range from a medium duty chassis to a heavy duty "squad" utility body mounted on a commercial chassis. Other ESU support vehicles can include one or more ambulances, wheeled or tracked armored vehicle, portable light towers/generators up to 100 kW, emergency support vehicles which contain inflatable marine watercraft or massive inflatable airbags.

== Non-law enforcement ESUs ==
ESUs also exist as a non-law enforcement agency based municipal, county or non-government entity and may exist as both career and volunteer groups which are located in urban, rural and remote areas. Non-law enforcement ESUs provide temporary emergency response to incidents during major public events to support the jurisdictions primary 911 EMS, fire and rescue service. ESUs also provide tactical emergency medical support, rescue of confined space victims, wildland–urban interface initial fire suppression, underwater rescue/recovery, high angle rope rescue, wildland search & rescue (SAR), auto accidents victim rescue, building collapses.

In rural areas, ESUs perform suppression of wildland forest, brush and grass fires that occur, cliff and mountain search and rescue, underwater search and rescue, swift water and flood rescue operations. The key rationale for the integration of the functions is that many rural and remote communities do not have dedicated staffing, resources and infrastructure to sustain immediate 24/7 emergency response. A local ESU may exist to mainly provide emergency training such as CPR/AED, first aid, 1st responder, etc. to citizens, communities, OSHA work site and to marine/boating. This mobile training capability uses a light-duty emergency vehicle that is fully equipped with a basic life support (BLS) responder medical, wildland/urban interface firefighting system, powered hydraulic and air bag rescue systems, self-contained breathing apparatus and protective fire gear and other equipment and, when requested, can support the local emergency response system as a rapid intervention vehicle.

A state or local public health Emergency Services Unit manages the Department’s emergency supplies, supporting technologies used during disasters, and helps fulfill the National and state Emergency Support Function (ESF) #8 Health & Medical Services and ESF #6 Mass Care & Sheltering needs of community citizens during a major emergency or disaster.

Local chapters of the American Red Cross often maintain an Emergency Services Unit to provide disaster relief assistance to individuals and families affected by local disasters at fires and local disaster shelters as well as mobile emergency response vehicles (ERV)/ mobile canteens. Scores of our Nation's hospitals and medical centers use Emergency Services Unit to denote their specific organizational section that encompasses their emergency department (ED), Hospital Emergency Incident Management System (HEICS)-Emergency Coordination Center (ECC) and/or their "First Receiver" outside patient decontamination system, and sometimes includes a hospital operated emergency medical service (EMS) paramedic ambulance program.

Emergency Services Unit can also often denote a government or non-government entity emergency mental health or family crisis intervention team.

== Criticism ==
Critics claim that the increasing number of ESU and SWAT is a sign of militarization of police and an overreach of (or over-reliance on) police to perform tasks that can otherwise be performed by other services. Among the critics is the Cato Institute's Radley Balko, who has written several books and articles on the subject.

== See also ==
- Community Emergency Response Team (CERT)
