= Tokubetsu-keibi-tai (Metropolitan Police Department) =

Rapid reaction force of the Tokyo Police

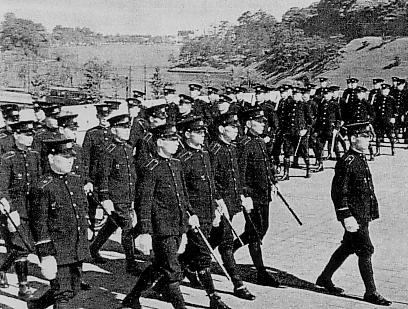
The Emergency Service Unit members with a jō.

The Emergency Service Unit (特別警備隊, Tokubetsu-keibi-tai) was a rapid reaction force (RRF) of the Tokyo Metropolitan Police Department (TMPD) in the pre-World War II era. This unit were interpreted as a Japanese counterpart of the New York City Police Department Emergency Service Unit.

== History ==
In 1933, this unit was established in the Police Bureau (警務部, Keimu-bu). The TMPD ESU was as popular as "Shinsengumi in the Shōwa period" even among the common people.

During the war, as Air raids on Japan intensified and civilian casualties increased, TMPD Emergency Service Unit was enhanced for relief mission and renamed as Security Unit (警備隊, Keibi-tai). At the same time, it was decided to set up similar units in other prefectures with major cities. But all these units were inactivated in 1946 as the occupation progressed.

However, on the same day, the Guard Section (防護課, Bougo-ka) was created for the same role in the TMPD only. In 1948, this section was reinforced to the Police Reserve Units (予備隊, Yobi-tai), and in 1957, they renamed to the Riot Police Units (機動隊, Kidō-tai) in conjunction with other prefectures.

== Organisation and Equipment ==
The TMPD ESU had a strength of 307 officers, divided into four companies. The TMPD ESU was responsible for apprehension of armed and dangerous criminals, counterinsurgency, crowd control, emergency management, internal security, operating in difficult to access terrain, providing security in areas at risk of attack or sabotage when chaos situations, public security, riot control, search and rescue people who affected by natural disasters, or other emergency missions.

TMPD ESU members were equipped with jō, tantō and FN Model 1910 pistols while ordinary police officers had only a sabre. They were also equipped with bulletproof vests if required.

== See also ==
- Law enforcement in Japan
