= List of mass shootings in Japan =

This article is a list of mass shootings in Japan. Mass shootings are firearm-related violence with at least four casualties. Excluded are shootings and massacres associated with the Imperial Japanese Army, acts of war and other colonial conflicts.

The data includes casualties of perpetrators, including self-inflicted gunshot or shooting of a perpetrator by police. The treatment of perpetrator casualties is at variance to some but not all definitions of a mass shooting used in the United States. The inclusion of injured victims in the data is also at variance with some of the US definitions that only include dead victims. However, the above treatment is consistent with that used in other Wikipedia lists of mass shootings by country.

== 21st century ==
Date	Location	Dead	Injured	Total	Description
30 August 2016	Wakayama, Wakayama Prefecture	2 (Note: Including the perpetrator or suspect)	3	5	A construction employee convicted of drug offenses opened fire at a workplace meeting on the day his jailing was scheduled, killing one person and wounding three others. The gunman killed himself the following day after barricading himself in a building.
12 January 2010	Habikino, Osaka Prefecture	4	0	4	2010 Habikino shooting: A man shot and killed three people at a bar, including the gunman's mother-in-law, before he committed suicide.
6 November 2009	Yokohama, Kanagawa Prefecture	1	3	4	A yakuza shot and wounded three men during a discussion before hiding in a building and fatally shooting himself.
14 December 2007	Sasebo, Nagasaki Prefecture	3	6	9	2007 Sasebo shooting: A man shot and killed two people and wounded six others at a gym before he committed suicide at a nearby Catholic church.
17–18 May 2007	Nagakute, Aichi Prefecture	1	3	4	Nagakute hostage incident: A man took his ex-wife hostage in a siege that lasted 29 hours and resulted in the death of a SAT member of the Aichi Prefectural Police, as well as injuries to another officer, his ex-wife, and child.
25 January 2003	Maebashi, Gunma Prefecture	4	2	6	Four people were killed and two others injured in a gang-related shooting.

== 20th century ==
Date	Location	Dead	Injured	Total	Description
17 October 1996	Kitakata, Miyazaki Prefecture	1	7	8	A man armed with a shotgun killed a man and wounded six police officers during the ensuing chase, before being wounded himself.
27 February 1984	Yamaguchi, Yamaguchi Prefecture	1	3	4	1984 JSDF Yamaguchi training ground shooting incident: A Ground Self-Defense Force corporal shot four other soldiers during a training exercise, fatally wounding one. He was arrested five hours later.
31 January 1980	Kumano, Mie Prefecture	8 (Note: Five by gunfire)	3	11	Kumano massacre: A farmer shot his two sisters, brother, and brother-in-law to death with a shotgun after killing his mother and two children with an axe. The gunman also wounded his wife and two neighbors before committing suicide.
26 January 1979	Sumiyoshi-ku, Osaka, Osaka Prefecture	5	6	11	Mitsubishi Bank hostage incident: A multiple hostage bank robbery that left several people dead and wounded.
6 November 1975	Aki, Kōchi Prefecture	6	2	8	1975 Aki shooting: A man shot and killed six neighbours and injured two others.
29 July 1965	Zama, Kanagawa Prefecture and Shibuya, Tokyo	1	17	18	Zama and Shibuya shootings: A double spree shootings in which a man shot and killed one police officer and wounded seventeen others.
12 December 1953	Nakatsugaru District, Aomori Prefecture	8 (Note: Seven by gunfire)	1	9	1953 Shinwa Village familicide: A man armed with a shotgun killed seven members of his family. He lit the house on fire, killing another. One person was wounded.
30 December 1949	Tokyo	3	1	4	An American soldier shot and killed two people, wounded another and killed himself.
21 May 1938	Kamo, Tsuyama, Okayama Prefecture	31	3	34	Tsuyama massacre: A man killed 30 people, including his grandmother, with a Browning shotgun, katana, and axe, and seriously injured three others before killing himself with the shotgun in a spree killing. He was motivated by revenge for sexual and social rejection. It is the deadliest shooting by a lone gunman in Japanese history.
1900	Fukuoka	14	?	14	A soldier killed 14 people in the city of Fukuoka, he was then acquitted by Court Marshall due to the fact he was suffering from delirium.

== See also ==
- 2023 Nagano attack - Shooting and stabbing in Nakano in which two police officers were fatally shot and two civilians stabbed to death
- 2023 Japan military facility shooting - Shooting in Gifu, in which two JGSDF personnel were killed and another injured
- Crime in Japan
