= Law enforcement in Japan =

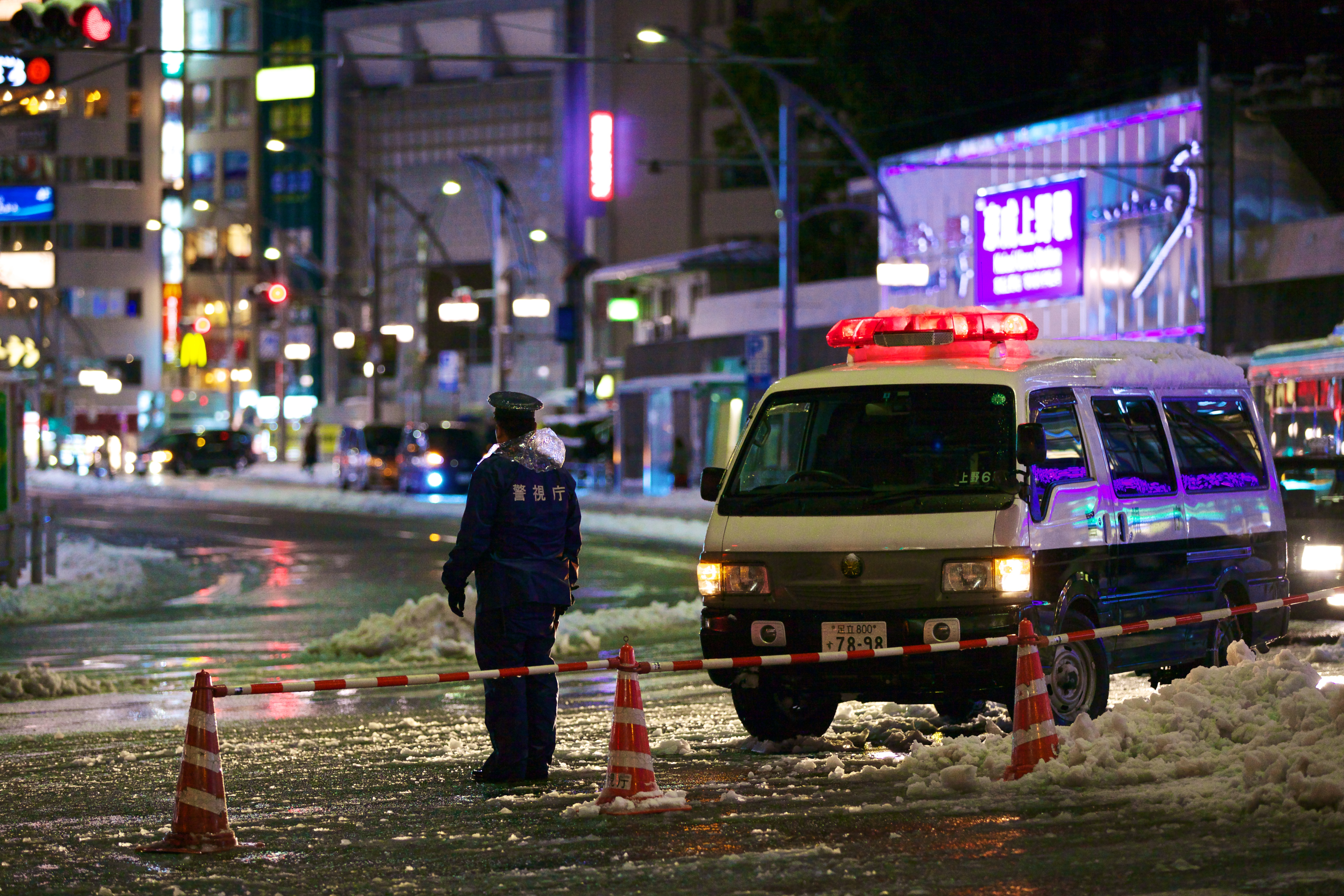
A Tokyo Metropolitan Police Department officer with their van outside Ueno Station

Law enforcement in Japan (Japanese: 法執行, Hepburn: Hō shikkō) is provided mainly by prefectural police under the oversight of the National Police Agency (NPA). The NPA is administered by the independent National Public Safety Commission (NPSC), ensuring that Japan's police are an apolitical body and free of direct central government executive control. They are checked by an independent judiciary and monitored by a free and active press.

== History ==
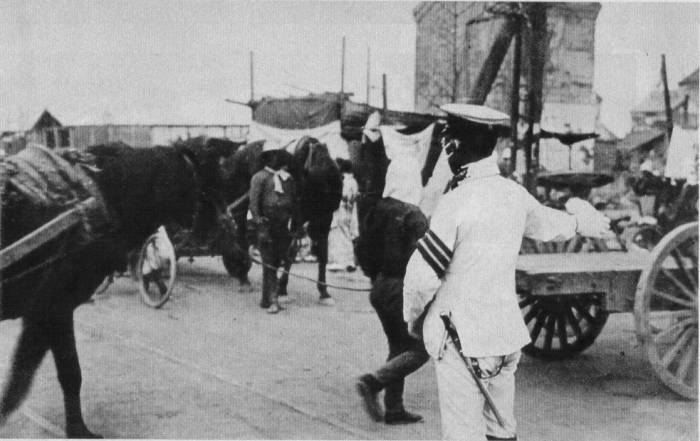
A police officer directing traffic after the 1923 Great Kantō earthquake

Following the Meiji restoration, the government of Japan, spearheaded by the efforts of statesman Kawaji Toshiyoshi, moved to establish a European-style civilian police system in 1874 under the centralized control of the Police Bureau within the Home Ministry to put down internal disturbances and maintain order. However, by the 1880s the police had developed into a nationwide instrument of government control, providing support for local leaders and enforcing public morality. In this period, the police acted as general civil administrators, implementing official policies and thereby facilitating unification and modernization; in rural areas especially, the police had great authority and were accorded the same mixture of fear and respect as the village head. Their increasing involvement in political affairs is widely considered a key part of Japan's development into an authoritarian state in the first half of the 20th century.

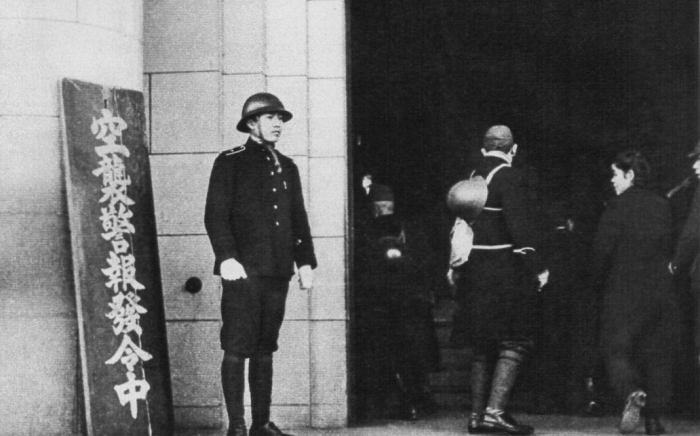
A police officer on air raid duty outside the TMPD's headquarters in 1945

In this period, the centralized police system steadily acquired responsibilities until it controlled almost all aspects of daily life, including firefighting, mediation of labor disputes, public health, regulation of business, factories, and construction, and the issuing of permits and licenses. The authority of the police was greatly expanded with the passing of the Peace Preservation Law of 1925, giving police the authority to arrest people for associating with organizations which aimed to alter the kokutai (国体) or 'national essence' of the nation, with the interpretation of 'association' and 'national essence' being broadly interpreted and capable of criminalizing most behaviours of which the police or government disapproved. As a result, the powers of the Special Higher Police (特別高等警察, Tokubetsu Kōtō Keisatsu, often abbreviated as the Tokkō) were greatly expanded to include the regulation of the content of motion pictures, political meetings, and election campaigns; at the same time, the Imperial Japanese Army's Kempeitai and the Imperial Japanese Navy's Tokkeitai, operating under their respective services and the justice and home ministries, increasingly aided the civilian police in limiting proscribed political activity. Following the 1931 Manchurian Incident, the military police forces assumed greater domestic authority, leading to friction with their civilian counterparts. After 1937 and the outbreak of the Second Sino-Japanese War, the police increasingly took responsibility for directing business activities for the war effort, mobilizing labor, and controlling transportation, continuing throughout the rest of World War II.

After Japan's surrender in 1945, the Supreme Commander for the Allied Powers initially retained the pre-war police structure, but soon began to see the system's organization as undemocratic, and as a result, the Police Law of 1947 (often referred to as the Old Police Law) was passed by the National Diet. Contrary to Japanese proposals for a strong, centralized force to deal with post-war unrest, the new police system was decentralized; about 1,600 independent municipal police forces (自治体警察, Jichitai keisatsu) were established in cities, towns, and villages with 5,000 inhabitants or more, and a National Rural Police (国家地方警察, Kokka chihō keisatsu) was organized by prefecture. Civilian control was to be ensured by placing the police under the jurisdiction of public safety commissions controlled by the National Public Safety Commission in the Office of the Prime Minister, the all-encompassing Home Ministry was to be abolished and replaced by the less powerful Ministry of Home Affairs, and the police were stripped of their responsibility for fire protection, public health, and other administrative duties.

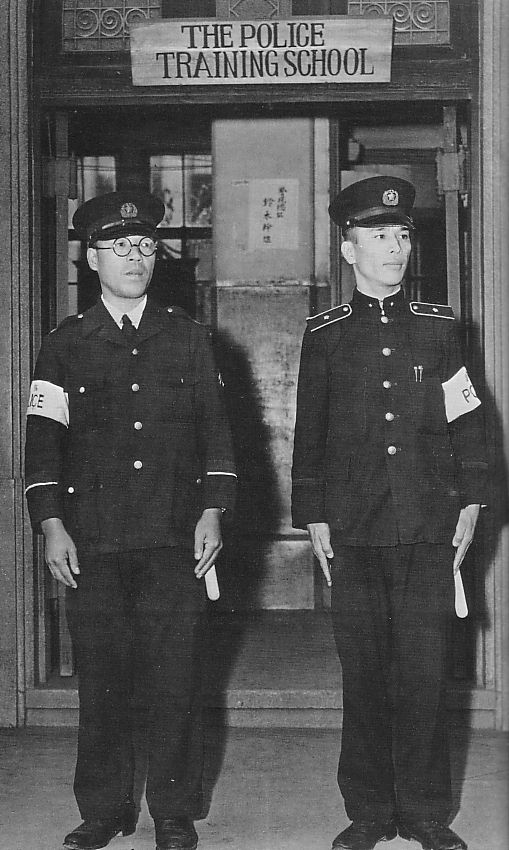
A pair of TMPD officers wearing newly-issued uniforms in 1946

When most of the occupation forces were transferred to Korea in 1950–51 with the Korean War, the 75,000 strong National Police Reserve (predecessor of the Japan Ground Self-Defense Force) was formed outside of the regular police organizations to back up the ordinary police during civil disturbances. Mounting pressure for a centralized system more compatible with Japanese political preferences led to the amendment of the Old Police Law in 1951 to allow the municipal police of smaller communities to merge with the National Rural Police; most forces chose this arrangement, and by 1954 only about 400 cities, towns, and villages still had their own police forces. Finally, an amendment totally revising the Old Police Law led to the modern Police Law of 1954, creating a yet more centralized system in which local forces are organized by prefectures under a National Police Agency. The revised Police Law of 1954, still in effect today, preserves some of the strong points of the post-war system, particularly measures ensuring civilian control and political neutrality, while allowing for increased centralization. The NPSC has been retained, and state responsibility for maintaining public order has been clarified to include coordination of national and local efforts; the revision also led to centralization of police information, communications, and record keeping facilities, and national standards for training, uniforms, pay, rank, and promotion. Rural and municipal forces were abolished and integrated into prefectural forces, which handled most policing matters, while officials and inspectors in various ministries and agencies continue to exercise special police functions assigned to them in the Old Police Law.

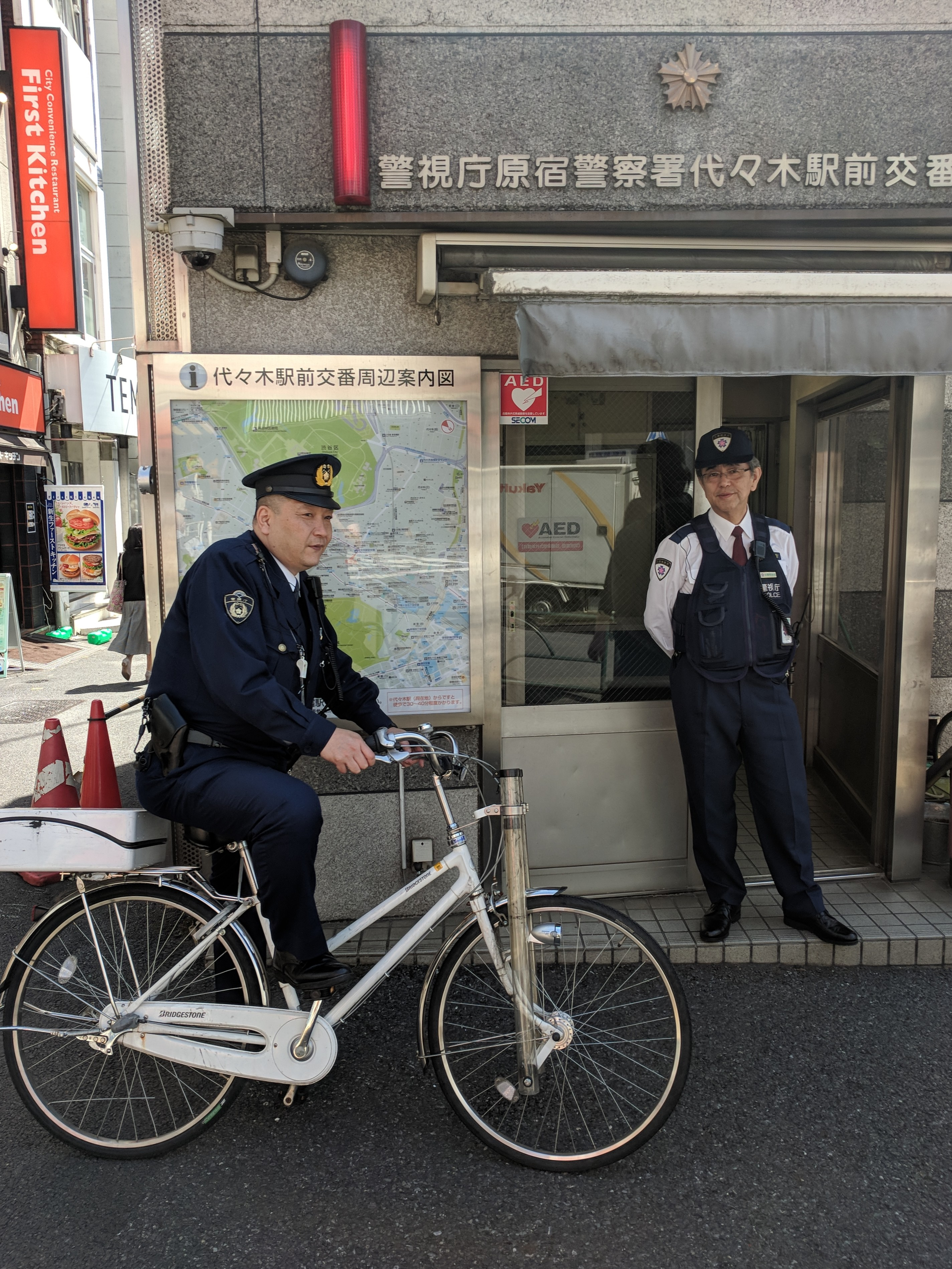
TMPD officers outside a kōban near Yoyogi Station

== Regular Police Organization ==
Prefectural police exist in each of Japan's prefectures and have full responsibility for regular policing duties in their area of responsibility. These prefectural police are primarily municipal police with authority and control lying with local governments, but their activities are coordinated nationally by the National Police Agency and the National Public Safety Commission. There also exists several agencies which have special policing functions under the national government.

=== National Police Agency ===
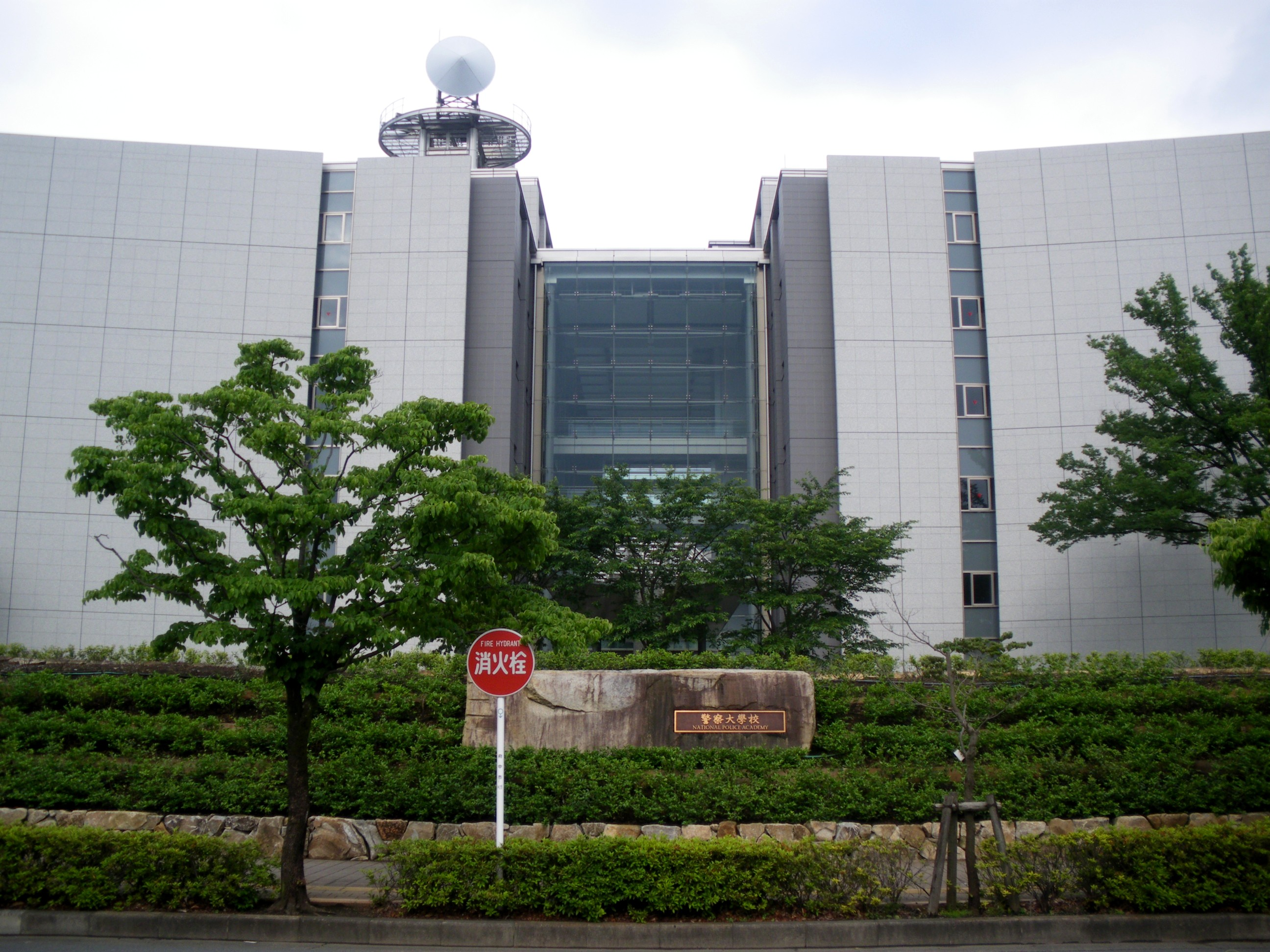
The National Police Academy in Fuchū, Tokyo

As the central coordinating body for the entire police system, the National Police Agency (Japanese: 警察庁, Hepburn: Keisatsu-chō) determines general standards and policies, while detailed direction of operations is left to the prefectural headquarters. However, in a national emergency or large-scale disaster, the agency is authorized to take command of prefectural police forces. In 1989, the agency was composed of about 1,100 national civil servants, empowered to collect information and to formulate and execute national policies, headed by a Commissioner-General who is appointed by the National Public Safety Commission with the approval of the Prime Minister. The Central Office includes the Secretariat, with divisions for general operations, planning, information, finance, management, and procurement and distribution of police equipment. The NPA also operates five regional bureaus. Citizen oversight is provided by the National Public Safety Commission.

As of 2017, the NPA has a strength of 2,100 police officers, 900 Imperial Guards, and 4,800 civilian staff, for a total of 7,800 personnel.

=== Prefectural police ===
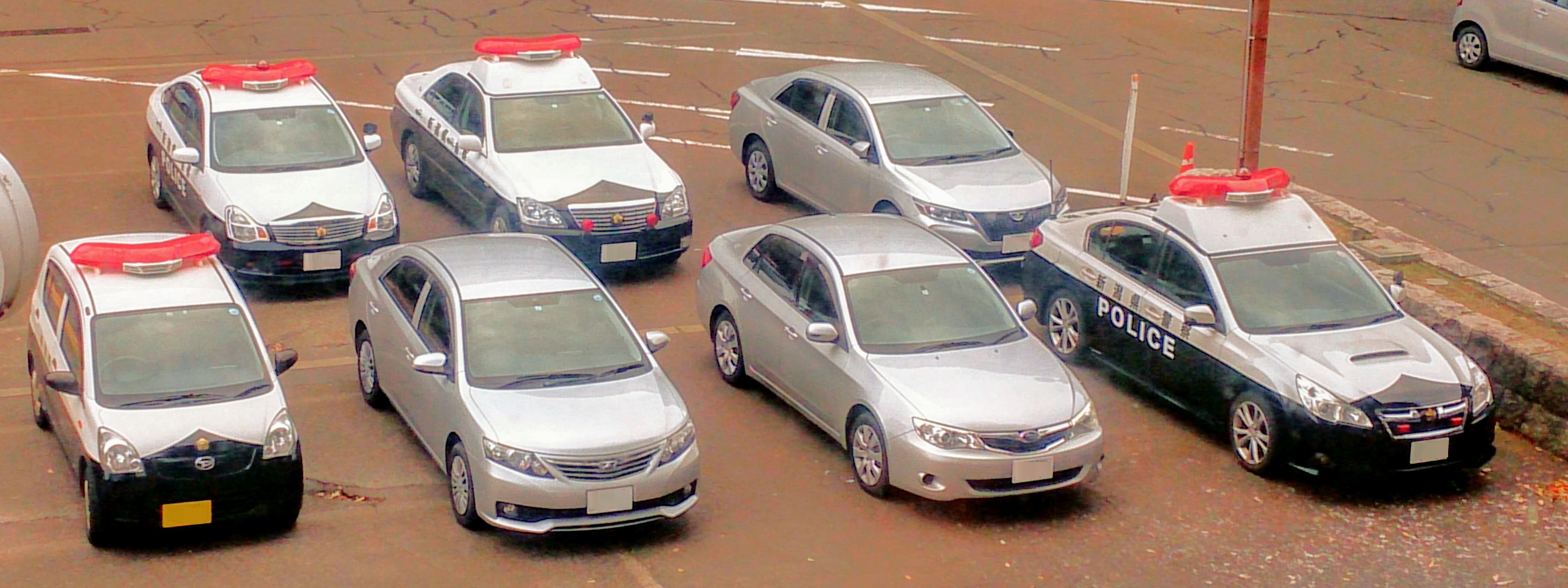
Niigata Prefectural Police cars on display in 2018

All operational police units are organized into prefectural police for each prefecture. Prefectural police are organized and commanded by their respective Prefectural Police Headquarters, and each one has a Prefectural Public Safety Commission and numerous operational units.

Most prefectural police are simply named the Prefectural Police (県警察, Ken-keisatsu) of their respective prefecture (e.g. Shizuoka Prefectural Police). However, certain prefectural police, especially those serving prefectures with larger populations, have different names: Tokyo's police is the Tokyo Metropolitan Police Department (警視庁, Keishi-chō); Hokkaido's is known as Dō-keisatsu (道警察); and Ōsaka's and Kyōto's are known as Fu-keisatsu (府警察).

The total strength of the prefectural police is 260,400 police officers and 28,400 civilian staff as of 2018, for a total of approximately 288,000 personnel.

== Staffing ==
Legally, there are two types of law enforcement officer in Japan: Judicial police officials (司法警察職員, Shihō keisatsu shokuin), prescribed by Article 189 of the Code of Criminal Procedure (刑事訴訟法, Keiji-soshōhō), who work for prefectural departments and make up the majority of officers, and Special judicial police officials (特別司法警察職員, Tokubetsu shihō keisatsu shokuin), prescribed in Article 190 of the same law, experts who generally work for national agencies dealing with specialized fields. There are also other public safety officials which have neither designation, and whose powers are legislated for in other acts.

As of 2017, the total strength of police reached approximately 296,700 personnel, including 262,500 police officers, 900 Imperial Guards, and 33,200 civilian staff; this includes approximately 23,400 female police officers and 13,000 female civilian staff.

=== Judicial police officials ===
Judicial police officers serving in prefectural departments or the NPA are divided into eleven ranks:

Rank	Roles in the National Police Agency	Roles in the Tokyo Metropolitan Police Department	Roles in a Regional Police Bureau	Roles in a large Prefectural Police Department	Roles in a small Prefectural Police Department	Badge Insignia	Workwear Insignia	Cap/Helmet Markings	Formal Sleeve Markings	Aiguilette Markings
Commissioner-General Japanese: 警察庁長官 Hepburn: Keisatsu-chō chōkan	Chief of the Agency						A gold emblem (the golden sun contained within a cherry blossom) with crimson accents upon a crimson circular cloth badge with gold edging	N/A	N/A	
Superintendent-General Japanese: 警視総監 Hepburn: Keishi-sōkan		Chief of the Department					A gold emblem (the golden sun contained within a cherry blossom) with crimson accents upon a crimson circular cloth badge with gold edging			
Senior Commissioner (aka Superintendent Supervisor) Japanese: 警視監 Hepburn: Keishi-kan	Deputy Chief of the Agency	Deputy Chief of the Department	Chief of the Bureau				A gold emblem (the golden sun contained within a cherry blossom) with crimson accents upon a crimson circular cloth badge with gold edging			
Commissioner (aka Chief Superintendent) Japanese: 警視長 Hepburn: Keishi-chō				Chief of the Department			A gold emblem (the golden sun contained within a cherry blossom) with crimson accents upon a navy blue circular cloth badge with gold edging			
Assistant Commissioner (aka Senior Superintendent) Japanese: 警視正 Hepburn: Keishi-sei				Station Chief	Chief of the Department		A gold emblem (the golden sun contained within a cherry blossom) with crimson accents upon a navy blue circular cloth badge with silver edging			
Superintendent Japanese: 警視 Hepburn: Keishi				Station Deputy Chief	Station Chief		A gold emblem (the golden sun contained within a cherry blossom) with crimson accents upon a navy blue circular cloth badge			
Chief Inspector (formerly Inspector) Japanese: 警部 Hepburn: Keibu				Station Squad Commander, Riot Company Leader	Station Squad Commander, Riot Company Leader		A silver emblem (the golden sun contained within a cherry blossom) with crimson accents upon a navy blue circular cloth badge			
Inspector (formerly Assistant Inspector) Japanese: 警部補 Hepburn: Keibu-ho				Station Sub-Squad Commander, Riot Platoon Leader	Station Sub-Squad Commander, Riot Platoon Leader					
Sergeant Japanese: 巡査部長 Hepburn: Junsa-buchō				Field Supervisor, Kōban Chief	Field Supervisor, Kōban Chief					
Senior Officer Japanese: 巡査長 Hepburn: Junsa-chō				Team Member	Team Member					
Officer Japanese: 巡査 Hepburn: Junsa				Team Member	Team Member					

The NPA Commissioner-General holds the highest position of the Japanese police. The title is not a rank, but rather denotes the position of head of the NPA. On the other hand, the MPD Superintendent-General represents not only the highest rank in the system but also assignment as head of the Tokyo Metropolitan Police Department.

Police officers whose rank are higher than Assistant Commissioner (警視正, Keishi-sei) are salaried by the national budget even if they belong to local police departments. The appointment and dismissal of these high-ranking officers is the responsibility of the National Public Safety Commission.

=== Special judicial police officials ===
There are several thousand special judicial police officials attached to various agencies of the national government responsible for such matters as forest preservation, narcotics control, fishery inspection, and enforcement of regulations on maritime, labor, and mine safety. In the Act on Remuneration of Officials in the Regular Service (一般職の職員の給与に関する法律), a salary table for public security officials (公安職, Kōan-shoku) including judicial police officials is stipulated.

- National Police Agency
  - Imperial Palace Guard Officer (皇宮護衛官)
- Ministry of Agriculture, Forestry and Fisheries
  - Forestry Agency
    - Officers of a Regional Forest Office (森林官)
  - Fisheries Agency
    - Authorized Fisheries Inspector (漁業監督官)
- Ministry of Justice
  - Prison Guard (刑務官)
- Ministry of Health, Labour and Welfare
  - Narcotics Agent (麻薬取締官)
  - Labor Standards Inspector (労働基準監督官)
- Ministry of Land, Infrastructure, Transport and Tourism
  - Japan Coast Guard
    - Coast Guard Officer (海上保安官)
  - Seafarer's Labor Officer (船員労務官)
- Ministry of Defense
  - Military Police Officer (警務官)
- Japanese-flagged ships
  - Captain
  - Department Heads
    - Chief mate
    - Chief engineer
    - Purser/Chief steward
- Ministry of Economy, Trade and Industry
  - Mining Inspector (鉱務監督官)

=== Other public safety officials ===
These officials fall into neither of the previous categories, but continue to be afforded authority to undertake public safety duties by various acts, and some of which are also on the payroll of the Public Security Service.

- The National Diet
  - Guard (衛視)
- Ministry of Justice
  - Immigration Services Agency
    - Immigration Officer (入国警備官)
    - Immigration Inspector (入国審査官)
  - Public Security Intelligence Agency
    - Public Security Intelligence Officer (公安調査官)
  - Public Prosecutors Office
    - Public Prosecutor (検察官)
    - Public Prosecutor's Assistant (検察事務官)
- Ministry of Finance
  - Customs and Tariff Bureau
    - Customs Officer (税関職員)
  - National Tax Agency
    - National Tax Agency Inspector (国税庁監察官)
- Ministry of Health, Labour and Welfare
  - Quarantine Officer (検疫官)
- Ministry of Agriculture, Forestry and Fisheries
  - Animal Quarantine Officers (家畜防疫官)
  - Plant Protection Officer (植物防疫官)

=== Comparison table ===
Officers working for public safety
Officer	are Special judicial police officials (特別司法警察職員)	can arrest suspects with arrest warrant	can carry firearms	Salary schedule which is applied
Imperial guard (皇宮護衛官)	✓	✓	✓	Public Security Service
Prison guard (刑務官)	✓	✓	✓	Public Security Service
Narcotics agent (麻薬取締官)	✓	✓	✓	Administrative Service
Labor Standards Inspector (労働基準監督官)	✓	✓	✗	Administrative Service
Authorized Fisheries Supervisor (漁業監督官)	✓	✓	✗	Administrative Service
Coast Guard Officer (海上保安官)	✓	✓	✓	Public Security Service
Military police officer (警務官)	✓	✓	✓	Officials of Ministry of Defense
Diet guard (衛視)	✗	✗	✗	(議院警察職)
Immigration control officer (入国警備官)	✗	✗	✓	Public Security Service
Immigration inspector (入国審査官)	✗	✗	✓	Administrative Service
Public security intelligence officer (公安調査官)	✗	✗	✗	Public Security Service
Public prosecutor (検察官)	✗	✓	✗	Public Prosecutor
Public prosecutor's assistant officer (検察事務官)	✗	✓	✗	Public Security Service
Customs official (税関職員)	✗	✗	✓	Administrative Service
cf. Police officer	(judicial police official)	✓	✓	Public Security Service

== Equipment ==
Police in Japan are routinely armed. In the pre-war period, Japanese law enforcement officials were armed with batons, katanas and sabres of different origins; later on, detectives, bodyguards, or SWAT units (such as the Special Security Unit of the TMPD) were issued pistols.

During the Occupation, Japanese police started to receive service pistols leased from the Allies under the recommendation from the Supreme Commander for the Allied Powers from 1949, and by 1951, all Japanese law enforcement officers were issued pistols.

Bodyguards and counter-terrorism units such as the Special Assault Team and the Special Investigation Team are equipped with 9×19mm Parabellum calibre semi-automatic pistols. However, the Heckler & Koch VP9 and Glock 45 were also spotted in the holsters of ordinary officers in Tokyo and Osaka respectively.

For Japanese police, sidearms are generally left at work when they are not on duty.

=== Current sidearms ===
Model	Origin	Type
New Nambu M60	Japan	Revolver
Smith & Wesson Model 37	United States	Revolver
Smith & Wesson M360J Sakura	United States	Revolver
SIG Sauer P230	West Germany	Semi-automatic pistol

=== Former sidearms ===
Model	Origin	Type	Period
FN Model 1910	Belgium	Semi-automatic pistol	Pre-war
FN M1905	Belgium	Semi-automatic pistol	Pre-war
Colt Model 1903	United States	Semi-automatic pistol	Pre-war
Colt Model 1908 Vest Pocket	United States	Semi-automatic pistol	Pre-war
M1911 pistol	United States	Semi-automatic pistol	Post-WWII
M1917 revolver	United States	Revolver	Post-WWII
Smith & Wesson Military & Police	United States	Revolver	Post-WWII
Colt Official Police	United States	Revolver	Post-WWII
Smith & Wesson Chiefs Special	United States	Revolver	Post-WWII
Colt Detective Special	United States	Revolver	Post-WWII

=== Less-than-lethal ===
Japanese police officers are trained in the martial art of Taiho-jutsu (逮捕術), based on the unarmed fighting styles of jūjutsu, as well as other types of budo, intending to pacify or disable suspects rather than employing more lethal means. Officers also routinely carry batons, and sasumata (刺股) "man catchers" are still kept by some forces, especially for riot control.

== Public safety ==
According to statistics of the United Nations Office on Drugs and Crime, among the 192 member states of the UN, and among the countries reporting statistics of criminal and criminal justice, the incidence of violent crimes such as murder, abduction, rape, and robbery is very low in Japan.

The incarceration rate is very low and Japan ranks 209 out of 223 countries. It has an incarceration rate of 41 per 100,000 people. In 2018 the prison population was 51,805 and 10.8% of prisoners were unsentenced.

Japan has a very low rate of intentional homicide victims. According to the UNODC it ranks 219 out of 230 countries. It has a rate of just 0.20 per 100,000 inhabitants. There were 306 in 2017.

The number of firearm related deaths is low. The firearm-related death rate was 0.00 homicide (in 2008), 0.04 suicide (in 1999), 0.01 unintentional (in 1999) and 0.01 undetermined (in 1999) per 100,000 people. There is a gun ownership rate of 0.6 per 100 inhabitants.

The intentional death rate is low for homicides with 0.4 per 100,000 people in 2013. However, the suicide rate is relatively high with 21.7 per 100,000 in 2013.

== See also ==
- Law of Japan
- Criminal justice system of Japan
- Crime in Japan
- Japanese Police Officers

=== Historical police organizations ===
- Shinsengumi (the samurai secret police organization of the Tokugawa Shogunate)
- Tokkō (the civilian secret police/intelligence organization of the Empire of Japan)
- Kempeitai (the military police and gendarmarie force of the Imperial Japanese Army)
- Tokketai (the military police and gendarmarie force of the Imperial Japanese Navy)
