= New Nambu M57 =

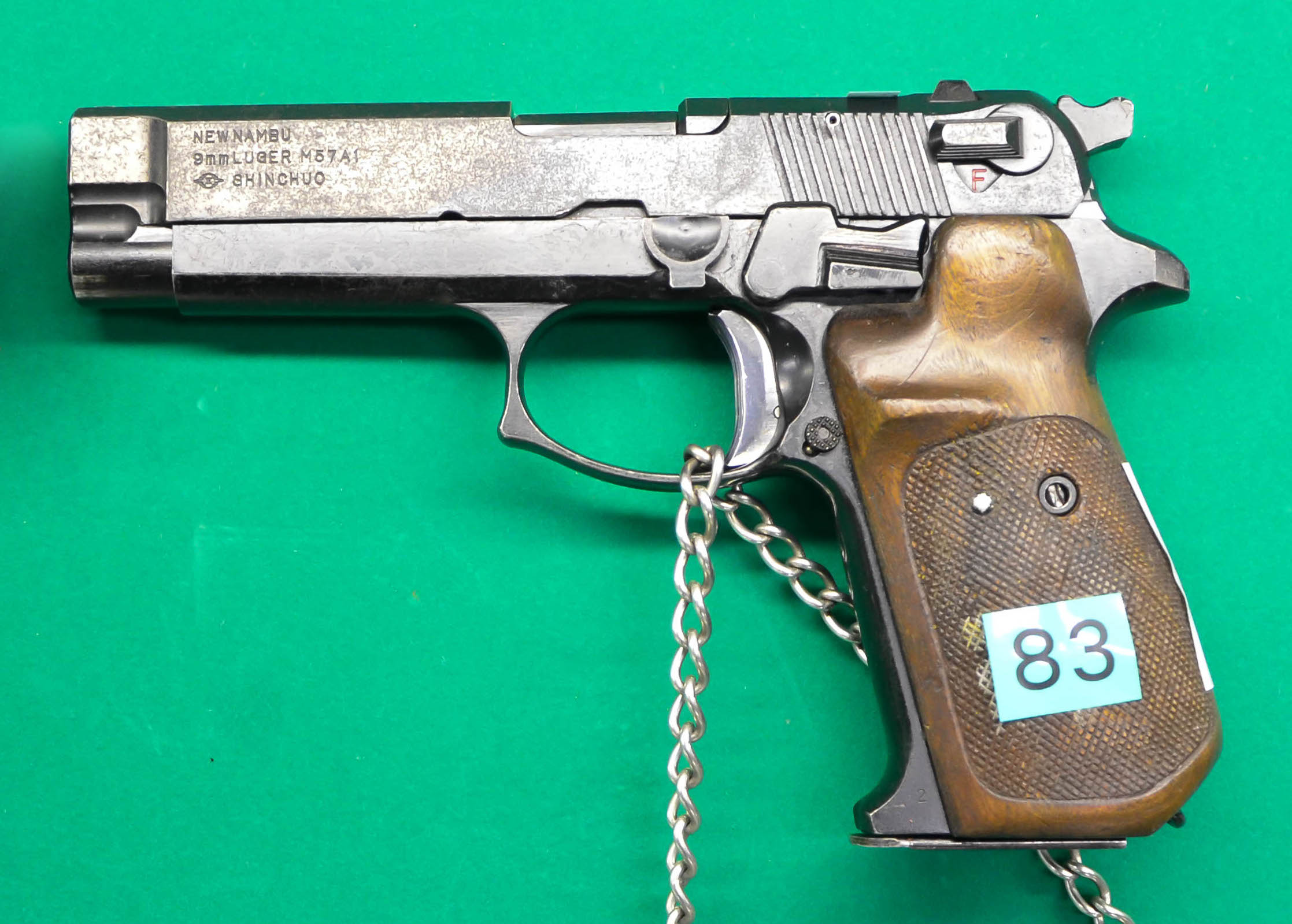
- A working M57A1 prototype on display at the JGSDF Ordnance School in Tsuchiura.
- Type: Semi-automatic pistol
- Place of origin: Japan

Production history
- Designer: Shin-Chuō Industries
- Designed: 1957
- Manufacturer: Shin-Chuō Industries (later merged with Minebea)
- Variants: See Variants

Specifications
- Mass: 960g (M57A) (Note: In Russian sources, the weight of M57A was claimed to be at 980g); 950g (M57A1); 590g (M57B)
- Length: 198mm - 200mm (M57A/A1); 160mm (M57B)
- Barrel length: 117mm (M57A/A1); 90mm (M57B)
- Cartridge: 9×19mm Parabellum (M57A/A1); .32 ACP (M57B)
- Caliber: 9mm (M57A/A1); 7.65mm (M57B)
- Action: Short recoil, locked breech
- Rate of fire: 24
- Effective firing range: 50 m (160 ft)
- Feed system: 8-round detachable box magazine

The New Nambu M57 (ニューナンブM57) is a series of semi-automatic pistols designed by Shin-Chuō Industries, later merged with Minebea. "New Nambu" was named after Kijirō Nambu, a notable firearm designer and the founder of Shin-Chuō Industries.

== History ==
In the Empire of Japan, there were many semi-automatic pistols such as Nambu pistols designed by Kijirō Nambu, but after the Surrender of Japan, firearms development had all ceased. So law enforcement officers and Japan Self-Defense Forces (JSDF) personnel were equipped with American-made firearms.

With the policy of protecting industrial growth, the Ministry of International Trade and Industry (MITI) had been oriented to domestic production of service firearms.

In 1957, the development was started by Shin-Chuō Industries under the leadership of the MITI. The development of three handguns had been promoted at the same time in parallel. Semi-automatic pistols were completed as New Nambu M57, while the revolver is known as the New Nambu M60.

Development was completed in 1958, but never entered service because of problems of interoperability between the JSDF and the United States Armed Forces. In the 1970s, the JSDF restarted the trial for 9mm caliber pistols in conjunction with the United States.

Minebea, the successor of Shin-Chuō Industries, developed a modified version of the M57A for the trial and contract. This version was completed as M57A1, but the JSDF selected the SIG Sauer P220 instead in 1982.

Small number of M57As and Bs were purchased in order to maintain production capacity and experience in manufacturing small arms in Japan, but they were never issued to the JSDF nor to any law enforcement agency.

== Variants ==
=== M57A ===
Combat pistol version for the JSDF and Maritime Safety Agency, which was the 9×19mm Parabellum version of the American M1911A1, in essence.

The M1911A1 was the standard service pistol of the JSDF, but its recoil was too strong for small-hand people such as average Japanese people, so a small-caliber version was required.

=== M57A1 ===
Improved version of the M57A.

=== M57B ===
Compact semi-automatic pistol created for railroad police and airport police officers.

The M57B is based on the FN Model 1910; firing mechanism is changed from striker to hammer-based.

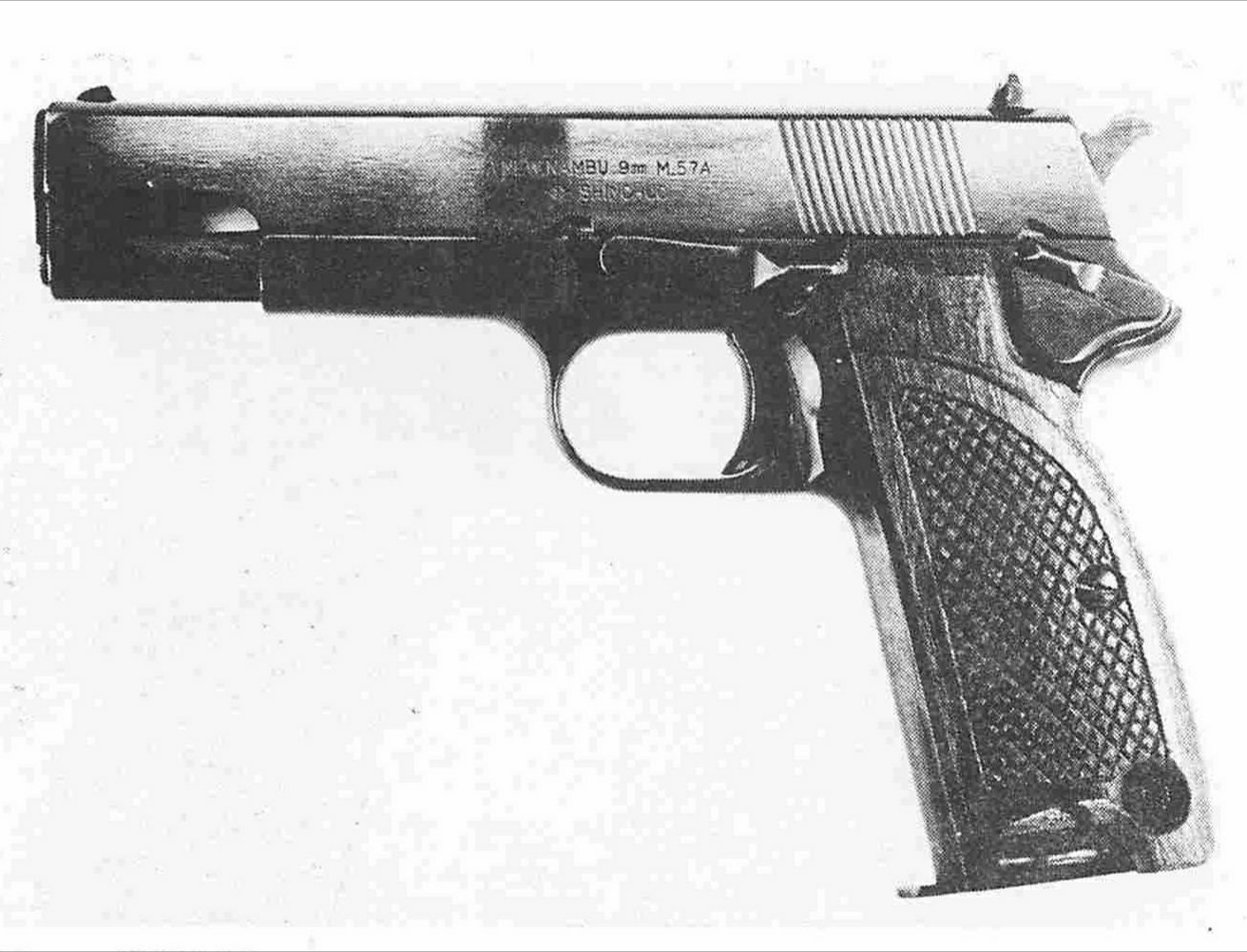
M57A

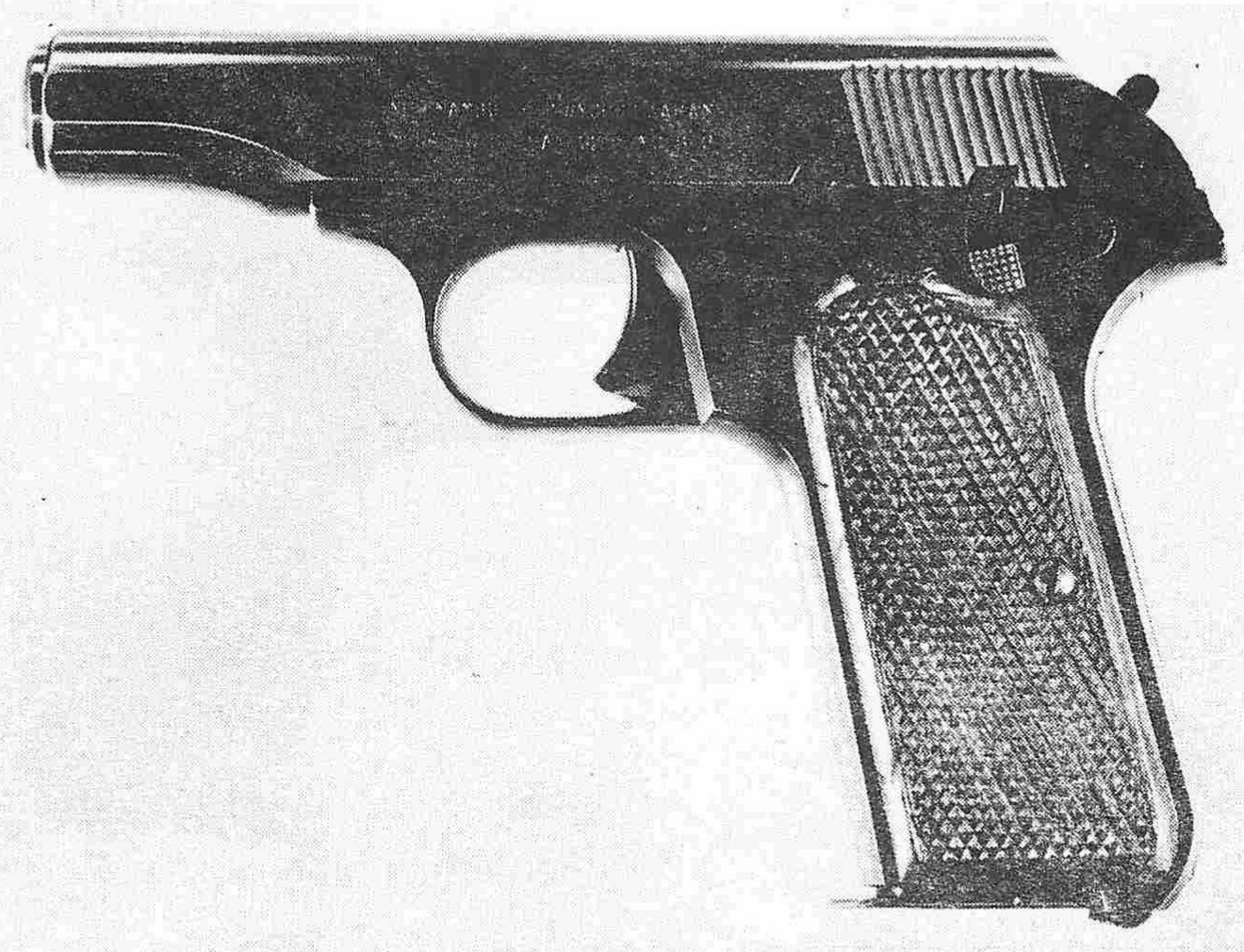
M57B
