= Japan Agriculture and Forestry Ministry Workers' Unions =

Trade union in Japan

The Japan Agriculture and Forestry Ministry Workers' Unions (Japanese: 全農林労働組合, Zennorin) is a trade union representing workers at the Ministry of Agriculture, Forestry and Fisheries.

The union was founded in 1958, and affiliated to the General Council of Trade Unions of Japan. It initially had 106,000 members, but this fell to 50,613 by 1970, and 37,060 by 1985.

From 1976, the union was also affiliated to the Japan Federation of National Service Employees, and from 1989 to the Japan Central Federation of National Public Service Employees' Unions, which was itself an affiliate of the Japanese Trade Union Confederation (RENGO). From 2011, it was instead affiliated to RENGO through the Japan Public Sector Union, and as of 2018 it had about 12,500 members.
