= Agricultural protectionism in Japan =

Agricultural Protectionism in Japan refers to the protection of farmers and the agricultural sector in Japan from international competition. The country has limited land to use for farming and until recent years, has been a protectionist country regarding agriculture. Farming in Japan has experienced economic inefficiency but has not dissuaded some Japanese from choosing to become either full or part-time farmers. In 2012 around 4% of the total work force in Japan was categorized as "agricultural workers", which was much higher than the United States (2.6%), England (1.5%) and Germany (2.8%). In order to support farming the Japanese government issued farmers massive grants. Due to increasing technology farming has increased in efficiency to where large rice fields can be harvested in about three days.

Japanese farms have also received support from the country's consumers, who are more likely to purchase domestically produced goods regardless of price, compared with goods produced in other countries.

== Politician influence ==
Farmers have received much political support in Japan. According to researchers such as Yusaku Horiuchi and Jun Saito, there are several possible reasons for this. One was that until the 1994 electoral reform, farmers were able to provide more organized political support such as votes, as consumers are more diffused and unorganized, making it difficult to collectively act and lobby. After the reform this became more difficult to accomplish and after the Japan Agricultural Cooperatives' decentralization reform in 2015 it became more difficult for farmers.

Another reason was that two of the biggest political parties of Japan made an effort to push for agricultural protectionism in Japan. The Liberal Democratic Party has been a pro-rural party since its establishment and the Democratic Party of Japan has also sought to get rural votes by advocating for income compensation for farmers. Two party competition & political mobilization around 2008 contributed to the government's increased effort to raise citizens’ concerns for food self-sufficiency issue.

== Food safety concerns ==
Other than politician influence on food protectionism, observers of Japan have thought that Japanese consumers seem to be willing to support the high price because of issues related with food safety as well. Possible disease and poison in import food made many Japanese worrisome and turned to domestic produced goods only. In 2001, China exported vegetables with pesticide residues to Japan. In 2004, bird flu was found in import from Thailand, Indonesia, etc. In 2008, dumplings imported from China were found to be poisoned. There were cases of unsafe food found in Japan as well. Mad-cow disease was found in Japanese beef in 2001. To best eliminate its negative effect, politicians quickly organized gathering to devour beef and invited mass media and ate beef in front of TV cameras to demonstrate its safety.

== Government policies and other institutions ==
The LDP & Ministry of Agriculture, Forestry and Fishery’s created a program called Food Action Nippon Program ("FAN"). The slogan for the program was "Everybody, let's increase the Food Self-Sufficiency Ratio!". It was aimed to educated consumers about Japan's low food self-sufficiency ratio and to encourage domestic consumption. In 2005, "Food Education" legislation was created to encourage using locally-grown food for public school lunches. Through this legislation, children were taught about local agriculture and food traditions and local farmers were benefited as well.

== Shift from food protectionism ==
Due to the aging of Japan and the decrease of couples having children, a large percent of the Japanese population is over the age of 65. Kazuhito Yamashita has claimed that this has resulted in an increase of government debt and makes agricultural protectionism no longer affordable. Japan, along with 10 other countries, negotiated the Trans-Pacific Partnership Agreement and member countries signed the agreement in 2016. The negotiation was aimed to eliminate tariffs on all products, without exceptions, within ten years from the conclusion. Yamashita also claims that trade liberalization is beneficial, as it lowers the food price and helps the government get rid of excessive subsidization of farmers.
