= 2023 Nagano attack =

Mass shooting and stabbing in Nakano, Japan

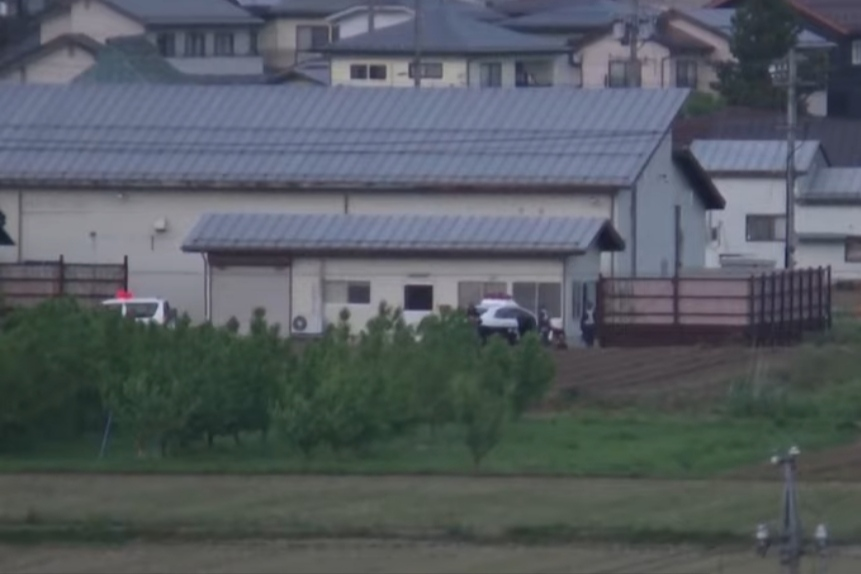
- Police at the crime scene shortly after the attack

- Location: 36°44′19″N 138°20′32″E; Nakano, Nagano Prefecture, Japan
- Date: May 25–26, 2023; 4:26 p.m – 4:37 a.m JST (UTC+09:00)
- Attack type: Stabbing, shootout, mass murder
- Weapons: Shotgun loaded with slugs, knife
- Deaths: 4
- Injuries: 0
- Perpetrator: Masanori Aoki
- Motive: Delusions; retaliation against perceived slights

On 25 May 2023, a man killed four people in a shooting and stabbing attack in Nakano, Nagano Prefecture, Japan.

== Incident ==
According to a witness, a masked man wearing camouflage chased a woman while brandishing a large knife, before stabbing her in the back. Upon the arrival of officers at the scene, the suspect fired what appeared to be a hunting rifle, striking multiple people. After the assault, the suspect sought refuge within the residence of Nakano City Assembly speaker, Masamichi Aoki. During the siege that followed, two relatives of the suspect, including his mother, managed to escape from the home. He was later apprehended and identified as Aoki's son at 4:37 A.M. the next day.

A woman in her 40s and two police officers, aged 46 and 61, were killed in the attack. The officers were identified as Inspector Yoshiki Tamai and Sergeant Takuo Ikeuchi, who were not equipped with bulletproof vests while responding to an emergency call. They were killed at close range with shotgun slugs.

An injured woman who was unable to be transported from the scene was pronounced deceased at 4:54. The Nagano Prefectural Police (NPP) requested an arrest warrant for the man on suspicion of murder on the morning of the 26th.

The National Police Agency (NPA) deployed the Tokyo Metropolitan Police Department's Special Investigation Team and the Kanagawa Prefectural Police's Special Assault Team in response to requests for assistance from the NPP.

== Attacker ==
After barricading himself inside his father's residence for several hours, the suspect, 31-year-old Masanori Aoki (born mid-1991), a farmer from the Nakano suburb of Edu, was eventually apprehended. Authorities confirmed that the suspect possessed a valid firearm permit.

The motive behind his actions remains unclear. When questioned by a witness about the reason for stabbing the woman, the suspect allegedly responded, "I killed her because I wanted to." He later stated that he thought the women he killed were talking badly of him during a police interrogation.

Masamichi Aoki, the speaker for the Nakano City Assembly, resigned the day his son was arrested.

At his trial, Aoki's lawyers argued that had "diminished capacity" because of schizophrenia and called for him to receive a life sentence. On October 14, 2025, he was sentenced to death for the murders.

== Aftermath ==
Following the arrest, residents of the area were initially compelled to find alternative accommodations for the night, and the local school remained closed. However, once the arrest took place, authorities informed the community that they were free to resume their daily activities.
