= Japan Central Federation of National Public Service Employees' Unions =

The Japan Central Federation of National Public Service Employees' Unions (Japanese: 日本国家公務員労働組合総連合会, Kokko Soren) was a trade union representing civil servants in Japan.

The union's origins lay in the Japan Federation of National Public Service Employees' Unions (Kokko Roren), an affiliate of the General Council of Trade Unions of Japan (Sohyo). In 1989, Sohyo merged in to the new Japanese Trade Union Confederation (RENGO), but only a minority of Kokko Roren's sectoral unions wished to join RENGO. Those which did established a new federation, Kokko Soren. On formation, it had 44,109 members, while in 1996 its membership was 43,697. In 2001, it joined the new Japan Public Sector Union (Kokko Rengo), but initially retained a separate identity. However, in 2011, it decided to dissolve, and its own affiliates became direct affiliates of Kokko Rengo.

The union's affiliates were:

- All Finance Bureau Labour Union
- All Hokkaido Development Bureau Employees' Union
- Japan Agriculture and Forestry Ministry Workers' Unions
- Okinawa Public Service Workers' Union

There was also an affiliate representing treasury workers.
