= Akiyoshi Umekawa =

Japanese mass murderer (1948–1979)

- Born: March 1, 1948; Ōtake, Hiroshima, Japan
- Died: January 28, 1979 (aged 30); Sumiyoshi-ku, Osaka, Japan
- Cause of death: Gunshot wound
- Known for: Perpetrator of the Mitsubishi Bank hostage incident
- Motive: Robbery, thrill, sadism

Details
- Date: December 16, 1963, January 28, 1979
- Country: Japan
- Locations: Ōtake, Hiroshima, Sumiyoshi-ku, Osaka
- Killed: 5
- Injured: 6+
- Weapons: 12-gauge Miroku model 1800 SW double-barrelled shotgun; New Nambu M60 revolver (stolen from police; unused); Knife

Akiyoshi Umekawa (梅川 昭美, Umekawa Akiyoshi; March 1, 1948 – January 28, 1979) was a Japanese mass murderer who killed a woman on December 16, 1963, and shot dead four people on January 26, 1979. Mass media also used a number of different possible readings of his given name, including Teruyoshi, Terumi, Akimi and Akemi. He was one of the rare criminals who was shot dead by Japanese police.

== Early life ==
Umekawa was born in Ōtake, Hiroshima. He was a great reader and loved hardboiled fiction. On December 16, 1963, while he was 15 and still a minor, he stabbed and killed 21-year-old Mitsue Nashi (Civil engineering contractor Sotaro Nashi's sister-in-law). Although he was a murderer, he was still allowed to have guns because Japanese juvenile law protected his criminal history. He also saw the film Salò, or the 120 Days of Sodom. He wanted to "make a big incident" 15 years after he committed the first murder.

== Mitsubishi Bank hostage incident ==
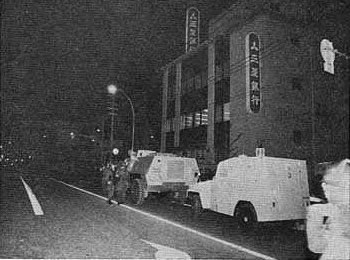
Police armored vehicles deployed at the scene of the Mitsubishi Bank hostage incident

Umekawa shot dead two employees (20-year-old sales clerk Hiroshi Hagio and 47-year-old branch manager Koji Morioka) and two policemen (52-year-old Inspector Masami Kusumoto and 29-year-old Officer Kazuaki Maebata) on January 26, 1979, in a Mitsubishi Bank in Sumiyoshi-ku, Osaka. He took 40 hostages at the bank. He asked them, "Do you know Sodom no Ichi (Japanese alternative title of Salò, or the 120 Days of Sodom)?"

He stripped women of their clothes, forcing them to form a human shield around him as he inflicted a drawn out regime of terror amongst them and the male hostages. He regularly threatened them with a shotgun, and refused to negotiate with police. Various methods were considered or attempted to observe or disable Umekawa, but were consistently foiled by him forcing the hostages to counteract them and keep police away.

Multiple hostages (26-year-old loan clerk Kunihiko Yoshitani was shot and severely wounded in the back of the head; 54-year-old general affairs clerk Koichiro Hirao was hit in the face) were injured during the standoff, largely as a result of ricochet from Umekawa firing his shotgun to intimidate them. One hostage, feigning death after being shot by Umekawa, had the top of his ear cut off by another hostage Umekawa had forced to verify his death. Despite this, the hostage, 47-year-old consultant Sadao Takeuchi (who was hit in the right shoulder), survived.

Rokuro Yoshida, who joined the criminal investigations of Kiyoshi Ōkubo and the United Red Army, was appointed as the incident commander. "Zero" Company of the 2nd Riot Police Unit of the Osaka Prefectural Police Headquarters (one of the predecessors of the Special Assault Teams) were called, which was the first case in the history of Japanese Police Tactical Units. After a 42-hour standoff (in which Umekawa and the hostages had barely slept), they managed to infiltrate the building and fatally shot Umekawa on January 28, 1979. Yoshida stated there was no alternative to deadly force.

The assault team was led by Inspector Kazuhiko Matsubara, and consisted of six officers: Chief Officer Hiroyuki Hoshino, Officer Munenori Kanno, Officer Masanao Tanigawa, Officer Toshinori Aiko, and Officer Yoshimi Fukada. Five people (Matsubara did not fire) fired eight shots, but only three hit Umekawa in the head, neck, and chest.

== Media ==
His crime affected Japanese youths. Lyricist Neko Oikawa said that his acts led her to investigate similar brutality, which is why she did not have leftist views. The story of the film Tattoo Ari was inspired by him, but an alternative name was used for him in the film.

== See also ==
- Special Assault Team
- Salò, or the 120 Days of Sodom
