= Special Assault Team =

Japanese police tactical units

- 特殊急襲部隊 (Japanese); Tokushu Kyūshū Butai (Japanese)
- Patch of SAT
- Active: 1977 – 1996 (as Special/"Zero" Company); 1996 – present
- Country: Japan
- Agency: Prefectural police
- Type: Police tactical unit
- Role: Counter-terrorism; Law enforcement
- Abbreviation: SAT

Structure
- Operatives: approx. 300
- Teams: Tokyo (Most SAT operatives) at the Metropolitan Police HQ; Osaka; Hokkaidō; Chiba; Kanagawa; Aichi; Fukuoka; Okinawa

The Special Assault Team (特殊急襲部隊, Tokushu Kyūshū Butai; SAT) is a police tactical unit maintained by individual Japanese prefectural police forces and supervised by the National Police Agency. It is a national-level counterterrorism unit that cooperates with territorial-level Anti-Firearms Squads and Counter-NBC Terrorism Squads. Most information on the unit is confidential, and its existence was not officially revealed until 1996.

The SAT is officially known in Japanese as simply Special Unit (特殊部隊, Tokushu Butai) and individual teams officially take the name of the police to which they are assigned; an example would be the Tokyo Metropolitan Police Department Special Unit (警視庁特殊部隊, Keishicho Tokushu Butai; Metropolitan Police Department Special Unit) for the SAT unit assigned to the Tokyo Metropolitan Police Department.

== Background ==
By the mid-1970s, Japanese law enforcement already established the Special Firearms Squad (特殊銃隊, Tokushu Jūtai), part-time sniper squads being launched as a response to the Kin Kiro incident in 1968. Assault sections were later established in some urban squads; these squads were predecessors of the Anti-firearms squads, but they were only part-time SWAT teams at this time.

In response to the Dhaka Incident, the National Police Agency decided to set up full-time anti-terrorism special units at the Tokyo Metropolitan Police Department and the Osaka Prefectural Police Department in secret. The Tokyo unit was established as the Special Company (特科中隊, Tokka-chūtai) of its 6th Riot Police Unit and the Osaka unit as the "Zero" Company of its 2nd Riot Police Unit. The Tokyo unit was nicknamed SAP (Special Armed Police), and it was recognized as the official name around 1982 and the flag was awarded. Several SAP officers were sent to West Germany to be trained by GSG 9 operators due to their experience in resolving the hijacking of Lufthansa Flight 181. They were instructed on using Heckler & Koch MP5s, which they first used in the 1980s.

In 1996, it was officially announced that the tactical units had been organized, and their unit name were changed to SAT, Special Assault Teams. In addition to the MPD and Osaka teams, additional teams for the Hokkaido, Kanagawa, Chiba, Aichi, and Fukuoka Prefectural Police were also established. In 2005, a team of the Okinawa Prefectural Police was established, and existing units were also reinforced.

== Organization ==
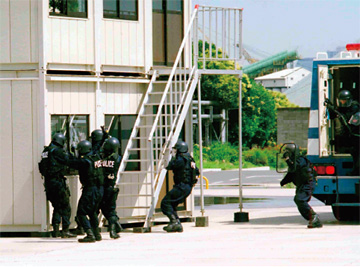
SAT operators disembarking from an armored vehicle and preparing to enter a structure

=== Structure ===
SAT teams are set up at eight prefectural police agencies. In most prefectures they belong to the Riot Police Unit, but in the MPD it is directly under its First Security Division, Security Bureau, and the Security Division under the Osaka Prefectural Police.

Total strength is about 300 officers. It is said that three teams in the Metropolitan Police Department, two teams in the Osaka Prefectural Police Department, and one team in each of the other Prefectural Police are set up. Each team consists of a command section, an entry section, a sniper support section, and a technical support section.

=== Recruitment and training ===
Members are recruited from Riot Police Units. When the unit was founded, the members were selected from rangers, rescue specialists, snipers and martial artists. It is said that they will be subject to inspection and inspection for officers under 30 years old. In order to maintain physical strength, the period of service is assumed to be approximately 5 years. SAT operators who are due to end their post are usually transferred to other departments in the Security Bureau, but some are transferred to the Special Investigation Team (SIT) of the criminal investigation department to introduce their SWAT-based tactics for the department.

Although SAT training is enigmatic, a retired SAP member recalled that Airborne Ranger Courses of the Japan Ground Self-Defense Force, counter-insurgency, and air assault training had been conducted. Nowadays, SAT has training facilities in six locations nationwide, and training at Yumenoshima is sometimes released to reporters.

There are also exchanges with overseas police forces, at least with joint training with the German GSG 9. 10 SAT officers were placed under training by Queensland Police's Specialist Service Branch in Queensland, Australia.

The SAT does joint exercises with the SFGp. The SAT also conducted joint training in 2014 with the Nucleo Operativo Centrale di Sicurezza.

=== Equipment ===
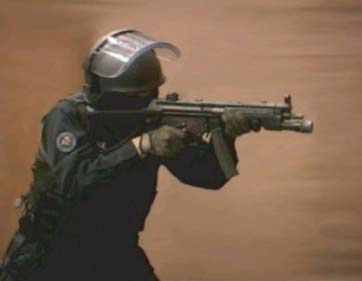
An SAT operator aiming a Heckler & Koch MP5

In addition to standard service handguns, SAP units have used Heckler & Koch P9S pistols as their main sidearms. After being reorganized into the SAT, usage of Heckler & Koch USP and Smith & Wesson Model 3913 have been confirmed to be used with the Glock 19, SIG Sauer P226/P226 E2 and Beretta 92 Vertec being used.

The SAT has used Heckler & Koch MP5A5, MP5SD6, and MP5K (including MP5K PDW) submachine guns. There is also information that SAT units have adopted Howa Type 89 assault rifles, Heckler & Koch HK53s, and M4 carbines; on October 22, 2014, the National Police Agency has purchased 5.56mm ammunition from Heckler & Koch's Japanese distributor, JALUX Inc., confirming that the SAT has officially deployed the Heckler & Koch HK416 as one of their main assault rifles. For training, they are equipped with MP5 blue guns.

The Howa Golden Bear, followed by the M1500, were used as sniper rifles. The Howa Type 64 rifle was also used as a designated marksman rifle. Later on, the Heckler & Koch PSG1 and L96A1 also have been deployed in most SAT units.

The SAT is also known to use the Remington M870 and various Benelli- and Mossberg-type shotguns for raids, door breaching, and firing non-lethal ammunition.

SAT teams operate special Heavy Special Armored Vehicle (銃器対策警備車, Jūki-taisaku-keibi-sha) and unmarked bulletproof cars.

The first units that stood up in the 1970s initially forced their operators to purchase tactical equipment with their own money through mail-in ads in military magazines.

== Operational history ==
The "Zero" Company of the Osaka Prefectural Police had its first known incident on 26 January 1979 when they were deployed during a Mitsubishi Bank hostage incident in Osaka. In the incident, they shot dead Akiyoshi Umekawa after he gunned down two employees and two policemen.

As the SWAT ability of other departments improved, the SAT became the "last ditch" of the Security Bureau of the National Police Agency, and opportunities to conduct direct domestic action decreased. In the Gulf Crisis of 1990, the SAP unit was dispatched to Saudi Arabia for non-combatant evacuation operation. During the Japanese embassy hostage crisis in Peru, the SAT had simulated raids on retaking buildings similar to the Japanese Embassy as a possible counter-measure to a similar incident on Japanese soil.

On 21 June 1995, All Nippon Airways Flight 857 was hijacked at the Hakodate Airport in Hokkaido by a lone hijacker named Fumio Kutsumi (九津見 文雄). This incident marked the first time that the Japanese Air Self-Defense Forces cooperated with the SAP by providing Kawasaki C-1 aircraft as means of transportation from Haneda Airport. SAP officers assisted Hokkaido Prefectural Police officers in storming the plane.

In May 2000, the Osaka and Fukuoka SAT assisted detectives of the Hiroshima Prefectural Police when they stormed a hijacked bus in Fukuoka in the Nishi-Tetsu bus hijacking, capturing the lone hijacker alive. Due to the self-defense requirements as stipulated in the Law Concerning Execution of Duties of Police Officials, it took more than 15 hours for the hostage crisis to end. Stun grenades were used in the operation.

In September 2003, the Aichi SAT unit was deployed to resolve a hostage incident. However, the hostage-taker Noboru Beppu (別府 昇) committed suicide in an explosion which killed three and injured 41 others.

On 10 September 2005, Okinawa was established for a SAT unit to be operational. According to the NPA, the presence of American troops and the region's geography were taken into consideration in creating a unit to be stationed there, especially after Al-Qaeda had made terrorist threats against Japan in the past.

In May 2007, in a hostage crisis case in Nagoya, an ex-yakuza gangster named Hisato Obayashi (大林 久人) was captured after he killed Kazuho Hayashi (林 一歩), an Aichi SAT operative. Prior to shooting Hayashi, Obayashi shot a uniformed officer who was called in to respond to a domestic violence incident at 4 in the afternoon. The Aichi SIT was in charge with the Aichi SAT assisting, but the stray bullets hit the SAT operative. Hayashi, an inspector in the Aichi Prefectural Police, (Note: Japan Today indicated that he was a Sergeant and was given posthumonous promotions to captain.) was the first SAT officer to be killed in action. His death forced National Public Safety Commission Chairman Kensei Mizote to issue a press report, stating that SAT equipment would be checked to see if it was responsible for Hayashi's death. The SAT Support Staff (SSS) was created in the wake of the hostage taking in Aichi Prefecture. They are in charge of coordinating with the prefectural police criminal investigation department, assisting the police chief and coordinating liaison with the National Police Agency Security Bureau.

On 14 December 2007, a mass shooting occurred at the Renaissance Sports Club in Sasebo, Nagasaki, when Masayoshi Magome used a shotgun to kill two persons and wound six others. The Nagasaki Prefectural Police Anti-Firearms Squad and Fukuoka SAT were sent in to intervene in the shooting.

On 9 February 2015, Japanese media suggested that the SAT can potentially be dispatched to work alongside officers from the Terrorism Response Team-Tactical Wing for Overseas. On December 22, 2015, TMPD and Kanagawa SAT units have conducted joint exercises in the wake of the upcoming G7 summit.

The SAT was deployed in May 2016 at the 42nd G7 summit, providing security alongside the Special Boarding Unit.

In June 2021, the SAT was deployed on a training operation to practice anti-terrorist operations in Tokyo as part of Tokyo Olympics security.

When Volodymyr Zelenskyy visited Japan during the 49th G7 summit, SAT operators participated as part of his protection detail in consideration of the Russian invasion of Ukraine.

On 25 May 2023, the Kanagawa Prefectural Police's SAT unit was deployed during the 2023 Nagano attack based on requests from the Nagano Prefectural Police (NPP).
