= 2007 Sasebo shooting =

2007 mass shooting in Japan

- Location: 33.180°N 129.724°E; Sasebo, Nagasaki Prefecture, Japan
- Date: 14 December 2007 c. 7:00 p.m. (GMT+9)
- Attack type: Mass shooting, double-murder, murder-suicide, attempted pedicide
- Weapon: Beretta AL391 shotgun
- Deaths: 3 (including the perpetrator)
- Injuries: 6
- Perpetrator: Masayoshi Magome (馬込政義)
- Motive: Uncertain, presumed despair over personal debt
- Verdict: Case closed without indictment in March 2008

On 14 December 2007, a gunman opened fire in a gym in Sasebo, Nagasaki Prefecture, Japan, killing two people and wounding six others, among them two children. 37-year-old Masayoshi Magome (Japanese: 馬込政義, Magome Masayoshi), the shooter and a longtime resident of Sasebo, was found dead in a nearby Catholic church the following day, having apparently died by suicide.

== Attack ==
At around 7:00 p.m. in local time, a masked man dressed in camouflaged clothing and armed with a Beretta AL391 shotgun opened fire in the Renaissance Sports Club during a swimming class, firing a total of ten shots. A 26-year-old woman, swimming instructor Mai Kuramoto (Japanese: 倉本舞, Kuramoto Mai), died at the scene, and a critically wounded 36-year-old man, fishing equipment maker Yuji Fujimoto (Japanese: 藤本勇司, Fujimoto Yuji), later died at the hospital. Another six people were injured, two of them girls aged 9 and 10. The gunman briefly held remaining gym-goers hostage before fleeing.

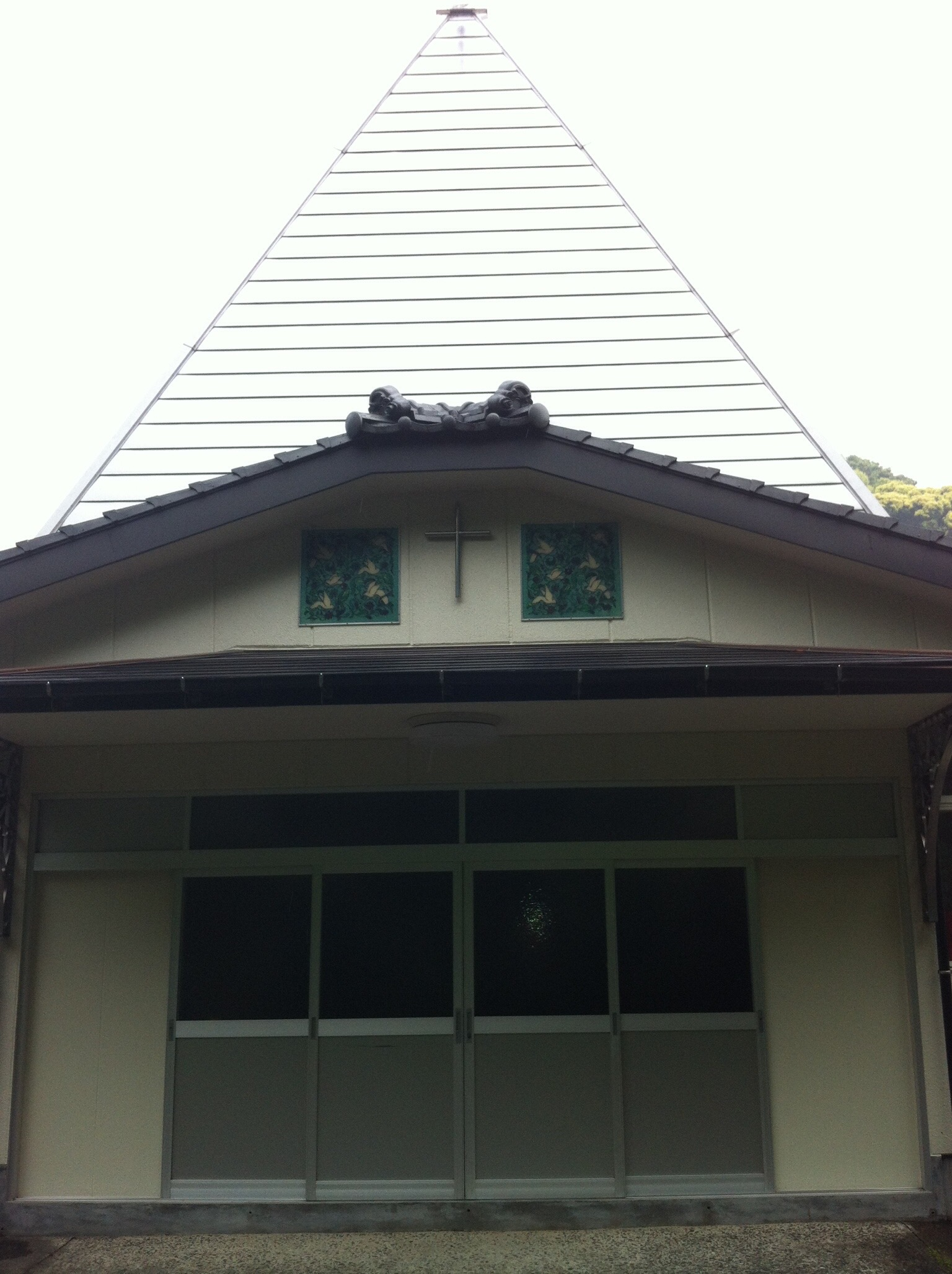
Funakoshi Catholic Church in Sasebo, where the suspected shooter was found dead the morning after the shooting took place, pictured in 2024.

=== Search for the perpetrator ===
The prefectural police departments of Nagasaki and neighboring Fukuoka responded to the incident shortly after, with Fukuoka deploying its Special Assault Team unit. Sasebo police began probing the homes of known shotgun owners in the city, reaching the home of licensed firearms owner Masayoshi Magome, where only his parents were present. They told officers that their son had recently asked them which church his family's graves were. Officers proceeded to said church and searched the surrounding area, but failed to locate Magome.

At 1:00 a.m., Magome's car was found parked outside a different Catholic church about 1 kilometer south of the previous church. At 6:00 a.m., a gunshot was heard inside, and at 7:30 a.m. his body was found, clutching a shotgun.

== Perpetrator ==
Masayoshi Magome (Born 1970) was a 37-year-old unemployed man who lived with his parents and had a history of mental illness. His family was Catholic but he did not attend church services regularly. He had a permit for three shotguns and an air gun. Local police allegedly received several past complaints from Magome's neighbors that he exhibited erratic and concerning behaviors, such as roaming the city while carrying his guns and appearing at their houses late at night asking to use their bathrooms. The only measure that had been taken by the police in response to these complaints was an informal request for Magome to voluntarily hand over his guns, which he did not comply with.

== Investigation ==
Investigators claimed that Magome was acquainted with Kuramoto and Fujimoto, the two people killed, and often ate at Fujimoto's home. It was discovered that Magome had invited around five different people via telephone and email, including Fujimoto, for meeting at the gym at the time and date the shooting ultimately took place. Fujimoto was the only person invited who had shown up.

Witness testimony, including Kuramoto's boyfriend, who was present during the attack, claimed that she appeared to be the Magome's main target, as she was chased down by him and shot at close range. Kuramoto's boyfriend also claimed that Magome had been stalking her for some time. Investigators concluded that Fujimoto was shot for attempting to intervene, for which his family was paid ¥3.77 million (approximately US$35,330 at the time) by the Nagasaki Prefectural Police as compensation.

Due to his death, prosecutors dropped the case against Magome and ceased investigations in March 2008. His motive was presumed to be "despair over mounting debts," but they were unable to ascertain details.
