= Special Investigation Team =

Tactical detective units of Japanese prefectural police

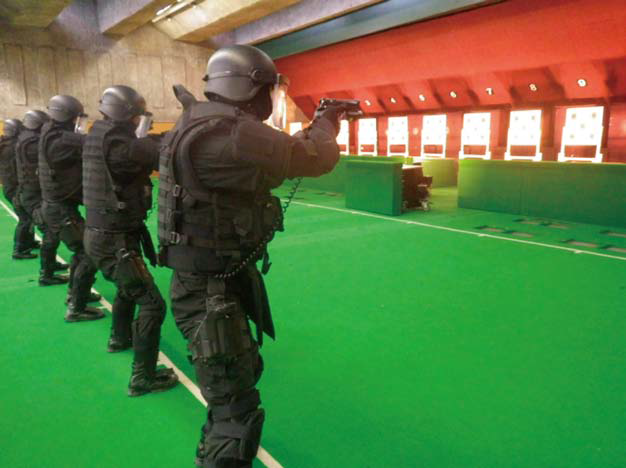
Hostage rescue operators of the Kumamoto PPH training at a shooting range

Special Investigation Teams (SIT) (特殊事件捜査係, Tokushu Jiken Sousa Kakari) are tactical detective units of Japanese prefectural police forces. Special Investigation Teams are maintained by prefectural police headquarters (PPH) and are trained to handle critical incidents including criminal investigation and tactical operations.

== Background History ==
In the 1960s, serious criminal cases such as kidnapping, aircraft hijacking, piracy, and bombings became an increasingly noticeable problem in Japan. The kidnapping of Yoshinobu Murakoshi, a four-year-old child, was the catalyst for the establishment of SITs. In this case, police detective Hachibē Hiratsuka was able to apprehend the suspect, but was too late to save the victim.

It became clear that traditional criminal investigation systems were sluggish and outdated for these new-style, rapid-tempo, and sometimes lethal cases. As a response to these problems, the Tokyo Metropolitan Police Department (TMPD) established the SIT unit within its Criminal Investigation Bureau in 1964. These detectives were well acquainted with new technology and special tactics to track and capture the criminals quickly and accurately.

At the beginning, the name "SIT" came from an acronym of its romanized Japanese unit name, Sousa Ikka Tokushuhan-Sousa-Kakari (捜査一課特殊犯捜査係), but later, the origin of its name as an acronym of its English nickname, Special Investigation Team, was added afterwards by misunderstanding from an officer who is fluent in English.

This idea achieved such a great success that in 1970, the National Police Agency (NPA) requested the establishment of these kind of units for other prefectural police forces throughout Japan. These detectives also became responsible for intervening and rescuing when hostages were in danger. In 1992, TMPD strengthened the SWAT capability by incorporating several SAT operators into its SIT.

== Organization ==
=== Structure ===
All unit are established in the First Investigation Divisions (捜査一課, Sousa Ikka) of each prefectural police headquarters (PPHs). These units are generally local-based, so organizations (including their unit names) and equipment are varied. Among them, the Special Investigations Team (SIT) of the TMPD and the Martial Arts Attack Team (MAAT) of the Osaka PPH are the first units to be created and still the most prominent units nationwide.

In the First Criminal Investigation Division of the TMPD, the following units are assigned for special criminal investigation activities:

- First Deputy Manager of Special Investigation (第一特殊犯捜査・課長代理)
  - Special Investigation Unit One (特殊犯捜査第一係)
  - Special Investigation Unit Two (特殊犯捜査第二係)
- Second Deputy Manager of Special Investigation (第二特殊犯捜査・課長代理)
  - Special Investigation Unit Three (特殊犯捜査第三係)
  - Special Investigation Unit Four (特殊犯捜査第四係)
  - Special Investigation Unit Five (特殊犯捜査第五係)
- Third Deputy Manager of Special Investigation (第三特殊犯捜査・課長代理)
  - Special Investigation Unit Six (特殊犯捜査第六係)
  - Special Investigation Unit Seven (特殊犯捜査第七係)

Of all these units, Units One and Two are in charge of hostage cases and especially known as "SIT". As of the early 2000s, there were over 60 detectives in total for these seven units, and about 30 detectives with Unit One and Two alone. On the contrary, some rural PPHs assign only one or two detectives to these offices, so in case of tactical operations, these units can be reinforced by detectives of Mobile Investigation Units (機動捜査隊, Kidō Sousa-tai), first responders for initial criminal investigations.

When rural prefectural police are struggling with an investigation, the NPA orders the TMPD or Osaka Prefectural Police to dispatch advisors. This custom evolved into the Special Investigation Dispatch Task Force (特殊班派遣部隊, Tokushuhan-haken-butai) as a formal institution of the NPA, being made up of experienced detectives selected from across the country. These detectives usually work at their respective PPHs, but they may be dispatched to other PPHs to provide advice to the local commander as needed.

The Task Force also conducts research on special investigations, such as participating in training at the Federal Bureau of Investigation and regular joint training sessions are held to disseminate its outcomes. The TMPD's SIT has also received advice on tactical operations from the Far East Field Office of the Naval Criminal Investigative Service in Yokosuka.

=== Capabilities ===
Detectives mandated for special investigation are trained to perform tactical operations, criminal investigation, and manhunts. They are also capable of telephone tapping, stakeouts, surveillance, and crisis negotiation. They are not responsible for counterterrorism, which is the responsibility of security divisions, such as Special Assault Teams (SAT) or Anti-Firearms Squads. However, in some rural prefectures such as Aomori, these detectives can form a counter-terrorism task force together with uniformed officers and riot specialists.

In addition to standard service handguns (.38 Special caliber revolvers such as New Nambu M60, or .32 ACP caliber semi-automatic pistols such as SIG Sauer P230), some units are equipped with large 9×19mm Parabellum caliber semi-automatic pistols (Beretta 92 Vertec, for example) and pistol-caliber carbines (Heckler & Koch MP5SFK, semi-automatic variant of MP5K with foldable stock). They also use non-lethal weapons such as the FN 303 or BGL-65. For gear, they reportedly use various PASGT, ACH and FAST helmets.

SIT units are required to apprehend suspects alive. For this reason, they do not maintain their own sniper teams; if necessary, the security divisions would dispatch sniper teams to the site.

=== SIT or similar units ===
As mentioned above, SIT or similar units have various names and may not have a specific name if they are small in number.

The units whose names are known from media reports are as follows:

- Special Investigation Team - Akita, Iwate, Ibaraki, Miyagi, Nagano, Fukushima, Tochigi, Shizuoka, Aichi, Mie, Fukuoka, Nagasaki, and Tokyo
- Martial Arts Attack Team - Osaka
- Assault Response Team - Chiba
- Special Tactical Section - Saitama
- Special Investigation Section - Kanagawa
- Technical Special Team - Aomori
- Hostage Rescue Team - Hiroshima
- Martial Attacking Rescue Section - Ehime

== Known Operations ==
In May 2007, in a hostage crisis in Nagoya, an ex-yakuza gangster named Hisato Obayashi (大林 久人) was captured after he killed Kazuho Hayashi (林 一歩), an Aichi SAT operative. The situation resulted in a debate in a Diet Committee on whether the Aichi SIT should have changed tactics from negotiating with Obayashi since the SIT unit at the time had a negotiator dispatched to help the SAT unit.

On May 25, 2023, the Tokyo SIT and the Kanagawa Prefectural Police's Special Assault Team was mobilized in Nagano response to requests for assistance from the NPP in a shooting/stabbing spree.

On October 31, 2023, the Tokyo SIT was sent to Warabi, Saitama in response to a hostage situation at the local JP Post office to assist the Saitama Prefectural Police based on requests.

== Controversies ==
On July 17, 2020, an officer with the TMPD's First Criminal Investigation Division was arrested for committing fraud.

== See also ==
- Mobile Task Force (MEK) – similar units in the German State Criminal Police Offices and Federal Criminal Police Office
- Research and Intervention Brigade – similar units in the French National Police
- LAPD Special Investigation Section – similar unit in the American Los Angeles Police Department
