= Fisheries Agency (Japan) =

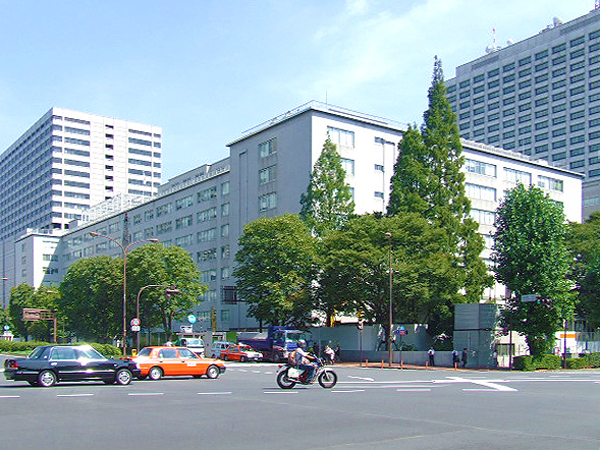
The Fisheries Agency is in the Ministry of Agriculture, Forestry and Fisheries building in Kasumigaseki

The Fisheries Agency (水産庁, Suisan-chō) is an agency under the Ministry of Agriculture, Forestry and Fisheries of Japan.

Its headquarters are in Kasumigaseki, Chiyoda, Tokyo.

The agency ensures that fish caught in Japanese territory are done so under Japanese law. It also sets fines for fish that are not caught under the law.

== See also ==
- Forestry Agency
