= Forestry Agency =

Japanese government agency

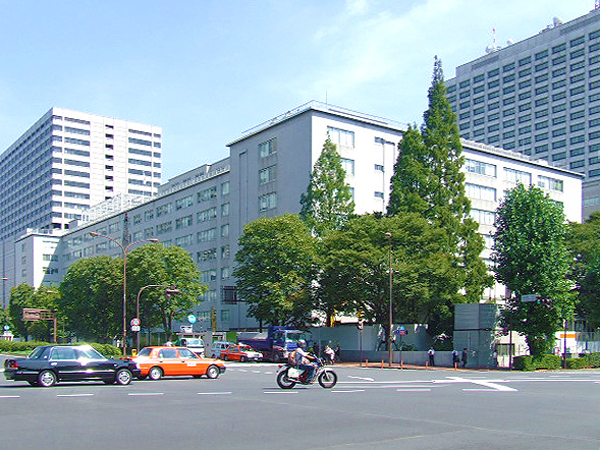
The Forestry Agency is in the Ministry of Agriculture, Forestry and Fisheries building in Kasumigaseki

The Forestry Agency (林野庁, Rinya-chō) is an agency under the Ministry of Agriculture, Forestry and Fisheries (MAFF) of Japan.

== Overview ==
Its headquarters is in Kasumigaseki, Chiyoda, Tokyo.

The agency manages Japan's forests, including those within Japanese national parks. There were plans to give to the Ministry of the Environment the responsibility for managing land. Toshio Kawada of The Asahi Shimbun stated, in regards to the forest management, "the work has been prone to bureaucratic sectionalism because land management and park administration are handled separately."

The agency keeps track of people who gain forestry businesses that are passed down by their families.

== See also ==
- Fisheries Agency
