= Aichi Prefectural Police =

Police department of Aichi prefectural government, Japan

Aichi Prefectural Police 愛知県警察 Aichi-ken Keisatsu
- Patch of AP

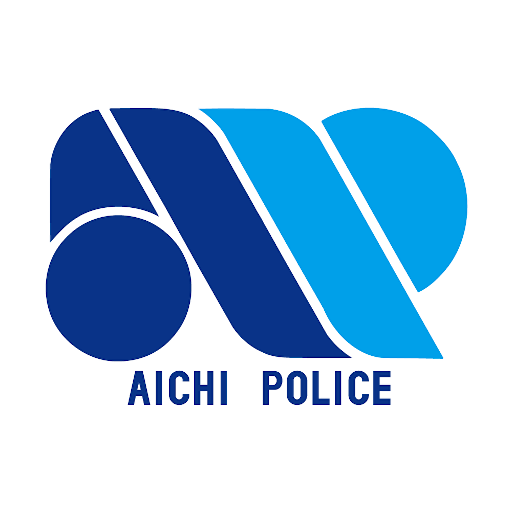
- Logo of the AP

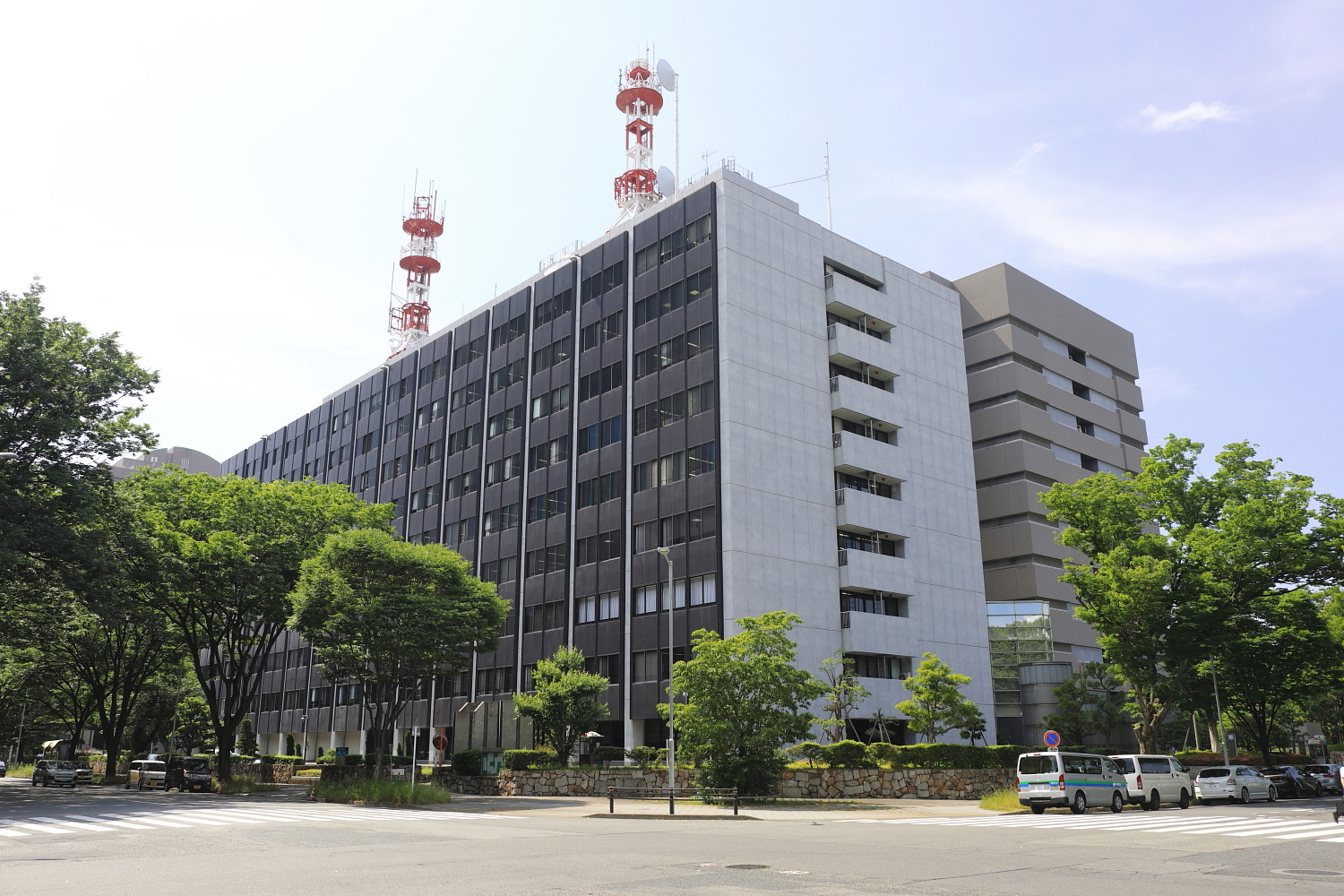
- Aichi Prefectural Police Headquarters (Photographed May 2022 (Reiwa 5th))
- Abbreviation: AP 愛知県警察

Agency overview
- Formed: 1 July 1954 (Shōwa 29)
- Preceding agencies: National Rural Police, Aichi Prefecture Headquarters; Nagoya City Police (Absorbed July 1955)
- Employees: 14,500

Jurisdictional structure
- Operations jurisdiction: Aichi Prefecture, JP
- Map of Aichi Prefectural Police's jurisdiction
- Governing body: National Police Agency (Japan); Chubu District Police Bureau]]

Operational structure
- Headquarters: 2-1-1 Sannomaru, Naka-ku, Nagoya
- Sworn members: 13,554
- Unsworn members: 958
- Agency executives: Tatsuya Kato, Senior Commissioner; Idehara Shigeru, Chief Superintendent
- Parent agency: Aichi Prefectural Public Safety Commission

Facilities
- Stations: 45
- Kōbans: 384
- Patrol Cars: 786
- Police Motorcycles: 252
- Boats: 7
- Helicopters: 4
- Police Dogs: 10

Website
- Aichi Prefectural Police (in Japanese); Aichi Police (in English)

The Aichi Prefectural Police (愛知県警察, Aichi-ken Keisatsu) is the prefectural police force responsible, under the control of the Aichi Prefectural Public Safety Commission, for policing Aichi Prefecture.

The mascot character is "Konoha-keibu", or "Chief Inspector Konoha" (Japanese: コノハけいぶ, Hepburn: Konoha Keibu), named after the prefectural bird, the Eurasian scops owl (Japanese: コノハズク, Hepburn: Konohazuku, thus got its name.).

== History ==
Its origins date back to 1871 (Meiji 4), when its predecessor organisation, the Aichi Division of Police was founded. The Aichi Division of Police was under the control of the Police Bureau of the Empire of Japan's Home Ministry from 1873 to 1947, when the Diet of Japan passed the Police Act 1947 during Allied occupation. After this, the newly organised National Rural Police took over policing the Aichi prefecture. After further reform of the Police Act in 1954, local police forces were organised by prefecture and made independent under the monitoring and guidance of the National Police Agency, and the current Aichi Prefectural Police was created. Further centralization efforts led to the merging of the Nagoya City Police in to the Aichi Prefectural Police in July 1955.

Uniquely, the Aichi Prefectural Police operated a prefecture-wide fingerprinting scheme from 1955 to 1970. Aichi was the only prefecture in Japan to do so. Under the scheme, all school leavers were required to give all ten of their fingerprints to the police. The purpose of collecting fingerprint data was officially to assist in identifying accident victims. During the program, there were over 2 million prints registered. However, in 1970, after an unidentified body was found in the neighboring Nagano prefecture, it was discovered that Nagano's police force had been given access to Aichi's fingerprint data. Privacy concerns were raised at the prefectural assembly, and the scheme was abolished as a result.

== Organization ==
The Aichi Prefectural Police is under the command of a Senior Commissioner and reports directly to the Aichi Prefectural Public Safety Commission.

=== Police Headquarters ===
General Affairs Department

- General Affairs Division
- Information Management Division
- Public Relations Division
- Detention Management Division
- Facility Management Division
- Accounting Division
- Equipment Division
- Office of the Hearing Officer

Public Safety Department

- Public Safety Division
- Resident Service Division/Information Disclosure Center
- Education Division
- Welfare Division
- Office of the Inspector

Public Safety Department

- Public Safety General Affairs Division
- Personal Safety Division
  - The command system for countermeasures against stalking has the police headquarters as the main control, and has a command system that commands each police station.
- Juvenile Division
- Safety-Security Division
- Economy Division
- Cyber Crimes Division
- Information Technology Strategy Division
- Public Safety Special Investigation Team

Regional Department

- Regional General Affairs Division
- Communications Command Division
- Police Aviation Division
- Motor Vehicle Enforcement (Kita-ku, Nagoya)
  - Main Unit (Kita-ku, Nagoya)
  - Meitō Branch
  - Meinan Branch (Tōkai)
  - Owari Branch
  - Nishimikawa Branch
  - Higashimikawa Branch
- Railway Police
  - Main Unit (Nakamura-ku, Nagoya)
  - Toyohashi Branch (Toyohashi)

Detectives Department

- Detective General Affairs
- Information Analysis and Investigation Division
- First Investigative Division
- Second Investigative Division
- Third Investigative Division
- Forensics Division
- Mobile Investigation Unit
  - Nagoya Subdivision
    - Main Unit (Kita-ku, Nagoya)
    - Nakagawa Branch (Nakagawa-ku, Nagoya)
    - South Branch (Minami-ku, Nagoya)
    - Kasugai Branch (Kasugai)
    - Ichinomiya Branch (Ichinomiya)
    - Tokai Branch (Tokai)
  - Mikawa Subdivision
    - Okazaki Branch (Okazaki)
    - Toyota Branch (Toyota)
    - Toyohashi Branch (Toyohashi)
- Criminal Special Investigation Unit
- Forensic Laboratory
- Organized Crime Task Force
  - Organized Crime Division
  - Fourth Investigative Division (Kudo-kai Special Task Force Office)
  - Drug and Firearms Division
  - International Investigative Division

Traffic Department

- Traffic General Affairs Division
- Traffic Guidance Division
  - Nagoya traffic violation notification center (Ahara-cho, Minami-ku, Nagoya)
  - Ichinomiya traffic violation notification center (Honmachi, Ichinomiya)
  - Okazaki traffic violation notification center (Myodaiji-cho, Okazaki)
  - Toyohashi traffic violation notification center (Hachimachi-dori, Toyohashi)
- Traffic Investigation Division
- Traffic Regulation Division
- Parking Task Force Division
- Traffic Control Division (Road traffic information is provided to radio broadcasts, etc. Japan Road Traffic Information Center - Nagoya Center broadcasts from here)
- Driver's License Division
- Driver's License Exam Center (Tempaku-ku, Nagoya)
- Higashimikawa Driver's License Center (Toyokawa)
- First Traffic Enforcement Division (Kita-ku, Nagoya)
  - Meihoku Subdivision
  - Meinan Subdivision
  - Guerrilla Subdivision
  - Bosōzoku Task Force
- Second Traffic Enforcement Division (Okazaki)
  - Nishimikawa Subdivision
  - Higashimikawa Subdivision
- Highway Traffic Patrol
  - Nagoya East Branch (Meitō-ku, Nagoya)
  - Nagoya West Branch (Kita-ku, Nagoya)
  - Handa Branch (Handa)
  - Okazaki Branch (Okazaki)
  - Toyota Branch (Toyota)

Security Department

- Security General Affairs Division
  - Cyber Attack Special Investigation Team
- First Public Security Division
- Second Public Security Division
- Third Public Security Division
- Security Division
- Disaster Response Division
- Foreign Affairs Division
- Tactical Riot Police (Komaki)
- G20 Summit Response Division

Nagoya Division of Police

- Planning and Coordination Division

Aichi Prefectural Police Academy

- General Affairs Department
- Academic Affairs Department
- Liberal Arts and Technical Education Department

== Data ==
As of 1 April 2022

- Police Stations - 45
- Kōban Police Boxes - 384
- Residential Police Boxes - 152
- Sworn Officers - 13,554
- Civilian Staff Members - 958
- Police Cars - 786 (Marked Vehicles)
- Police Motorcycles - 252
- Police Boats - 7
  - "愛1" "Aichi" 23m Type (Minato Police Station)
  - "愛2" "Tokoname" 17m Type (Tokoname Police Station)
  - "愛3" "Chita" 12m Type (Handa Police Station)
  - "愛5" "Nikkō" 12m Type (Minato Police Station)
  - "愛6” ”Irako" 12m Type (Toyohashi Police Station)
  - "愛7" "Chitachidori" 8m Type (Minato Police Station)
  - "愛8" "Aoi" 8m Type (Minato Police Station)
  - (Retired) "愛2" "Nagoya" (Tokoname Police Station)
- Helicopters - 4
- Police Dogs - 10

== Recent events ==
In 2005, with the opening of Chubu Centrair International Airport in Tokoname and the Aichi Expo 2005, the English 'POLICE' marking was added to the sides of police vehicles to make it clear to foreigners that it is a police vehicle. (The Kagoshima Prefectural Police did this first in 1999. After that, it spread to the Tokyo Metropolitan Police Department, Chiba, Kanagawa, Yamanashi, Shizuoka, Kyoto, Tokushima, Hiroshima, Fukuoka, and Okinawa Prefectural Police Departments.)

On 17 May 2007, a member of the Aichi Prefectural Police Special Assault Team was killed in Nagakute after a man took his ex-wife hostage. During the 29 hour standoff, the police lieutenant was shot in the neck while approaching the perpetrator when a dog barked, alerting him to the lieutenant's presence. According to the investigation report, it would be another five hours before he could be rescued, and by then, he could no longer be saved. The report recommended that bulletproof vests be more widely provided and that better sniper support be given in such situations.

== Scandals ==
- In July 2012, an Aichi police sergeant was arrested after being found with an illegal handgun and counterfeit currency in his car.
- On 19 September 2013, a Detective Chief Inspector was arrested on suspicion of leaking investigation information to the Kodo-kai.
- On 17 September 2014, several items of collected evidence were found dumped in the mountains near Seto City. Aichi Prefectural Police suspected that officers involved in the case intentionally disposed of the evidence.
- On 23 June 2015, a vehicle belonging to the Criminal Investigation Department's international investigation unit collided with a student on a bicycle in Chiba prefecture. The student was severely injured.
- On 4 December 2022, Man left naked, bound, with head in toilet bowl was found dead in police custody.

== Gallery ==
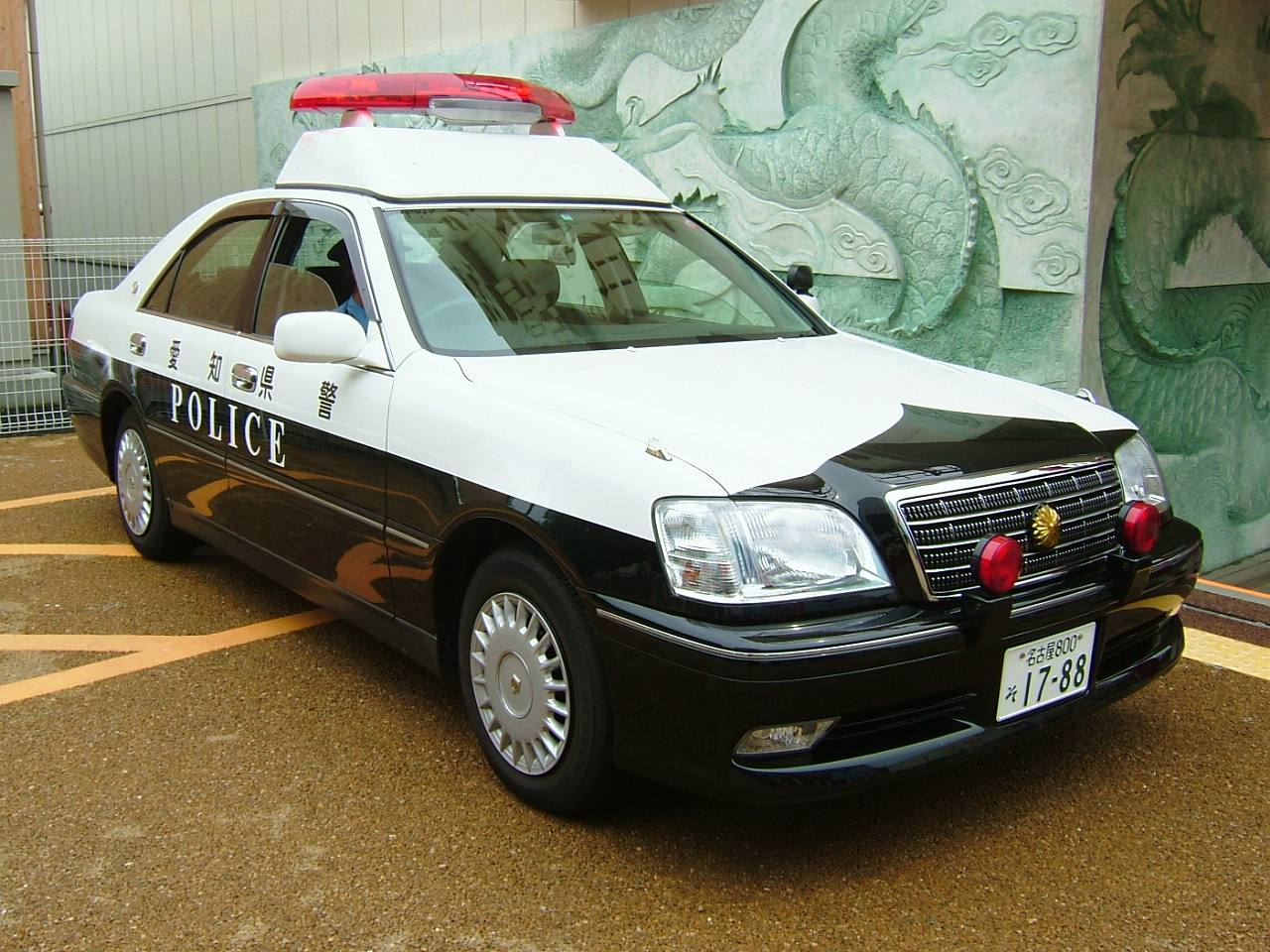
Aichi Prefectural Police patrol car

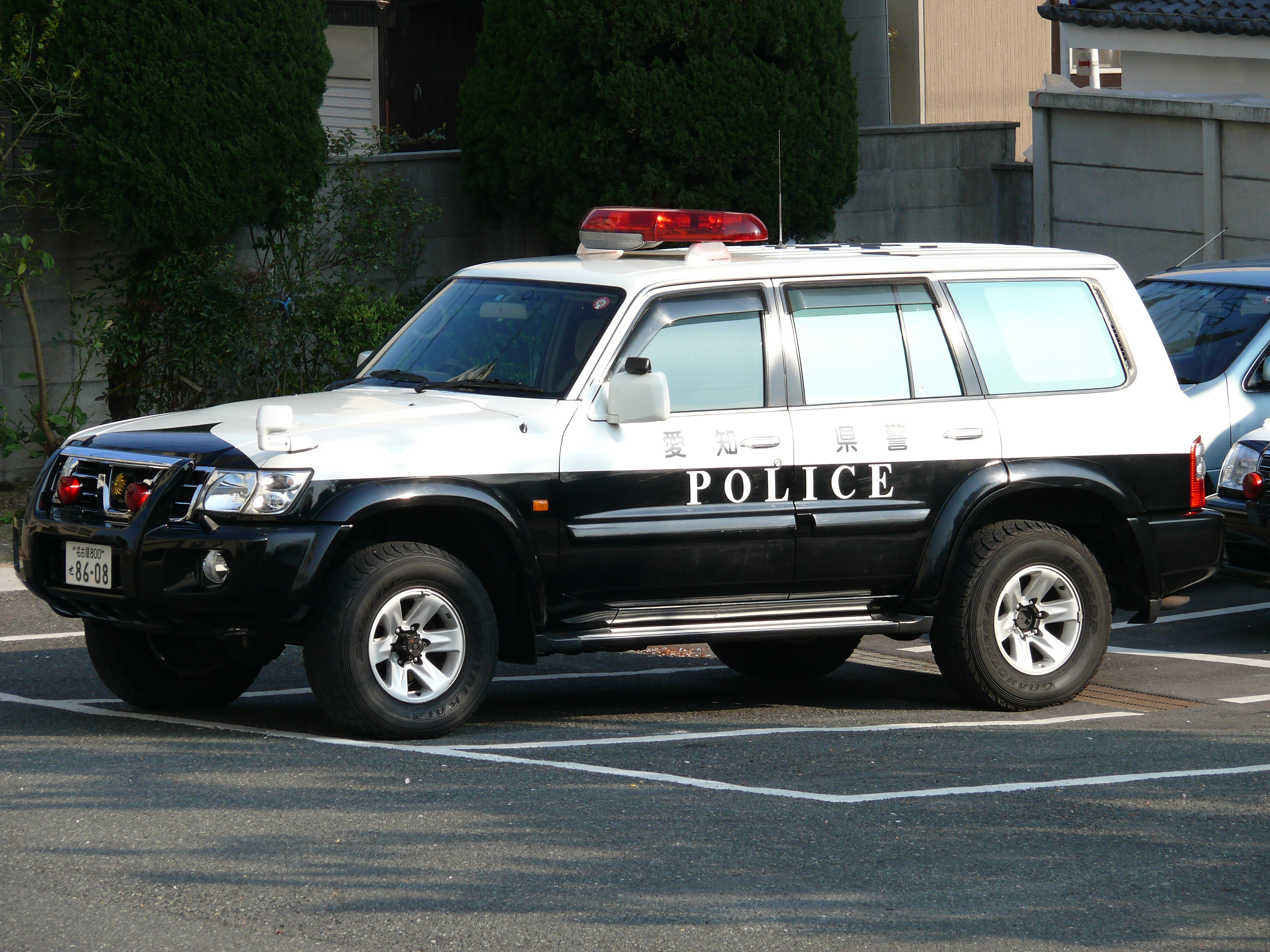
Nissan Safari police vehicle

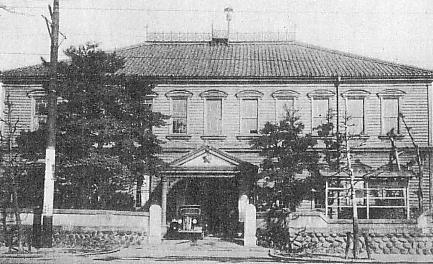
Aichi Prefectural Police Department Headquarters (Taisho era)

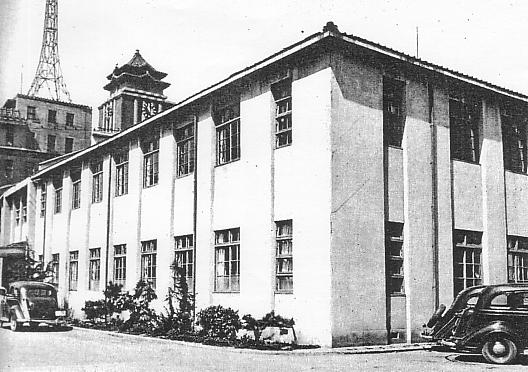
Nagoya City Police Headquarters in 1950
