= Nagakute hostage incident =

2007 Japanese hostage situation

- Native name: 愛知長久手町立てこもり発砲事件
- Location: Nagakute, Aichi, Japan
- Date: May 17, 2007 - May 18, 2007 (JST)
- Attack type: Hostage incident
- Weapon: .38-caliber Ruby Extra revolver
- Deaths: 1
- Injuries: 3
- Victims: 4
- Perpetrator: Hisato Obayashi
- Verdict: Life imprisonment

The Nagakute hostage incident (Japanese: 愛知長久手町立てこもり発砲事件) occurred between May 17 and 18, 2007, in Nagakute, Aichi, Japan, when Hisato Obayashi (aged 50) took his ex-wife hostage. The incident lasted for 29 hours and resulted in the death of a SAT member of the Aichi Prefectural Police in the line of duty, as well as injuries to another officer, Obayashi's ex-wife, and children. This incident became the first time a SAT member died in the line of duty.

== Timeline of events ==
=== Occurrence ===
At around 3:47PM of May 17, 2007, a 110 call was made to the police from a home in Nagakute saying, "My father is going crazy with a gun in his hand." Two minutes later, another call was made by the son who lived in the home, saying, "My father has calmed down now. Please don't come as he would be agitated if the police come. The gun he has is a toy." Officer Akifumi Kimoto (aged 54) from a nearby kōban responded to the two calls and Obayashi, a former member of the yakuza, fired his revolver at Kimoto, shooting him in the neck. Kimoto collapsed near the entrance. Because of the second call, the officer was not wearing a bulletproof vest but was instead wearing a stab vest. Soon after Kimoto was shot, ten officers from the local Aichi Police Station arrived in three vehicles. While six of them wore bulletproof vests, none were equipped with firearms.

Obayashi was discussing with his family whether to remarry with his ex-wife, Michiko Mori (aged 50), but the discussion was not going anywhere, causing him to lose his temper and bring out his gun. At around the same time he shot Kimoto, he also shot his son and daughter, Kento (aged 25) and Risa (aged 21) respectively, Kento in the left stomach and Risa in her right foot. The two managed to escape from their father despite Kento being seriously injured.

Obayashi took his ex-wife hostage and holed up in his home. Police sealed off all nearby traffic and tried to talk Obayashi down, but the man threatened the police saying things including "I'll shoot if you dare to bring an ambulance by", "I have a 100 rounds", and "I also have a bomb, and I'll set it off if you come near me", so police were unable to retrieve the wounded officer. The house was equipped with sensor lights that detected motion and came on every time Kimoto's arms moved. There were also three dogs in the residence that barked at any officers that came close to the home.

At around 4:45PM, while a detective was trying to talk to Obayashi, Mobile Investigation Unit members arrived at the scene. The officers placed themselves at Obayashi's blind spots outside the building and were prepared to shoot him but the order was given to stand down.

The Special Investigation Team of the Aichi Prefectural Police arrived at the scene around 5:30 to 6:00 PM. They initially planned to drive an armored vehicle through the main gate of the house in order to rescue Kimoto, but were ordered by headquarters to drop the plan. By that point, Kimoto radioed in that he "wasn't going to make it" and was no longer responding to the radio. As Obayashi was saying he would shoot his hostages, the police changed their plans.

Later, officers borrowed a nearby plot of land and started to practice the extraction of Kimoto using shields. The Special Assault Team (SAT) also arrived at the scene; the exact time of its arrival is unknown.

=== Kimoto is rescued ===
At 8:20PM, the operation to rescue Kimoto was given the green light. A total of 16 SIT and SAT members would enter the residence and carry Kimoto out with a stretcher, with an additional 14 SAT members supporting from the rear.

The rescue party would consist of a row of seven SIT members holding a large shield, followed by three armed SIT members, and six SAT members holding the stretcher. The additional support force consisted of five snipers standing by from a building 70 meters away, as well as nine officers standing nearby armed with a Heckler & Koch MP5 submachine gun. Three of the nine officers would support the rescue party from close by while hiding behind a special armored vehicle that slowly drove by the scene.

The operation started at 8:54PM, with the rescue party making their advance while Obayashi was on the phone with his daughter.

At 9:20PM, 25 officers inched their way to the house holding shields and firearms. At that point, it was decided that the armored vehicle would be parked a few meters before the planned location for fear that Obayashi would notice the vehicle. As a result, the three SAT members would be assisting from the front of the vehicle rather than behind the vehicle. The rescue team headed to the entrance of the house, while the three SAT members hid behind other police vehicles.

The rescue party was able to extract Kimoto as planned, and was in the process of carrying him out, when one of the dogs barked at the officers. Hearing this, Obayashi realized that the officers were close by and shot at the team. One of the shots hit a SAT member named Kazuho Hayashi (aged 23) in the left shoulder. Hayashi was wearing a bulletproof vest, but the bullet bounced off the left shoulder and then pierced his neck, an area where the vest had no stopping ability. The bullet shot through Hayashi's lower left shoulder near the neck and punctured his ascending aorta. Hayashi was quickly hospitalized, but died at 0:14AM on May 18 due to cardiac tamponade resulting from being shot. The bullet that killed Hayashi was retrieved from his body. Kimoto survived the ordeal, but suffered a subarachnoid hemorrhage and was left paralyzed on one side of his body.

According to later reports, the SAT was not notified of the dog and was ordered to shoot back if the suspect opened fire and visual contact was established. However, Obayashi shot Hayashi from behind a curtain, and as a result the police were unable to shoot back.

After Hayashi died, the MAAT from Osaka Prefectural Police was sent in and trained with the Aichi SIT to breach Obayashi's home; photos of that training were widely televised.

=== Rescuing the hostage ===
The standoff went on in to the 18th, but at around 10:35 AM, Obayashi called the local radio station ZIP-FM and demanded to talk with James Havens, who was on the air at the time.

Just after 2PM, Obayashi and Havens started to talk with one another, with officers supervising Havens, and Obayashi started to talk about himself.

At around 2:50 PM, Obayashi's ex-wife escaped from the toilet window while he was on the phone with Havens, and was taken in by the police. By this point the Osaka MAAT were being witnessed by members of the media.

=== Obayashi surrenders ===
After the hostage managed to escape, Obayashi's attitude gradually softened, and after negotiation with the police, he promised to exit his home at 7:20 PM.

Despite this, the man extended that time, and did not leave his home even after 7:30 PM. The local commander gave orders to reevaluate the SIT's breach training, and were planning to make their entrance by 10PM. (Note: It was later revealed that after he was unable to contact the negotiating police officer at around 7PM, he started to fear for his life, leading him to beg for his life on a 110 call.)

After 8:30PM, Obayashi complied to the police's urging of a safe apprehension, and was arrested on charge of murder by officers that descended on him. The man left his gun behind, and held a bag holding a family photo, towel, and a CD in his left hand, and a bottle filled with tap water on the right. (Note: Initially Obayashi claimed the bottle contained "The water of God" to officers.)

=== Further investigations ===
Later investigations revealed that Obayashi fired 1 round to Kimoto, and fired another round each to Kento and Risa who tried to intervene, wounding them.

Later on, Obayashi fired at Risa again as she was trying to help the wounded officer, but missed. Later he fired four rounds during the rescue operation, with one of the shots fatally wounding Hayashi.

Obayashi used a .38-caliber Ruby Extra revolver, and when the police confiscated the weapon, it was loaded with six shots, and an additional eight unused rounds and ten cartridges were found in the scene. As a result, it is believed that Obayashi had possession of at least 24 live rounds. Despite previous claims by Obayashi, no explosives were found in the property.

Hayashi was posthumously promoted two ranks and was awarded a police medal by Iwao Uruma, the commissioner general of the NPA, and also the Order of the Rising Sun by the Japanese Government.

The house that became the scene of the incident was demolished in 2008.

== Trial ==
Trials to this case started at the Nagoya District Court on October 7, 2008, and Obayashi was sentenced to life imprisonment on December 17. Both Obayashi and the prosecutor appealed to a higher court, but the verdict was held up by the Nagoya High Court on September 18, 2009, and ultimately by the Supreme Court of Japan on March 22, 2011.

== Immediate impact on the community ==
- May 17, 2007:
  - 4:14PM - The immediate area surrounding the Obayashi residence is closed off. Buses passing by the area, mainly those of the Meitetsu Bus, are forced to cancel bus operation if not make detours. (Note: For example, the bus route connecting Fujigaoka Station and the Nagakute Bus Depot regularly passes by the Aichi Gakuin University, but as that road fell under the no-go zone, the bus route was forced to make a left at the Kanihara Intersection, and make a right on to the Green Road.)
- May 18, 2007
  - 6:30AM - The Nagakute Board of Education declares all Nagakute elementary and middle school students to stay at home pending updates. (Note: Two public schools were located within the no-go zone)
  - 8:00AM - The N-Bus, the community bus of Nagakute, suspends operations for the day.
  - 10:00AM - Aichi Gakuin University cancels all of its classes for the day.
  - 11:00AM - The Nagakute Board of Education formally announces classes of all elementary and middle schools to be cancelled for the day. Daycare centers are also closed, and the Nagoya University of Foreign Studies also cancels its classes.
