= New Nambu M60 =

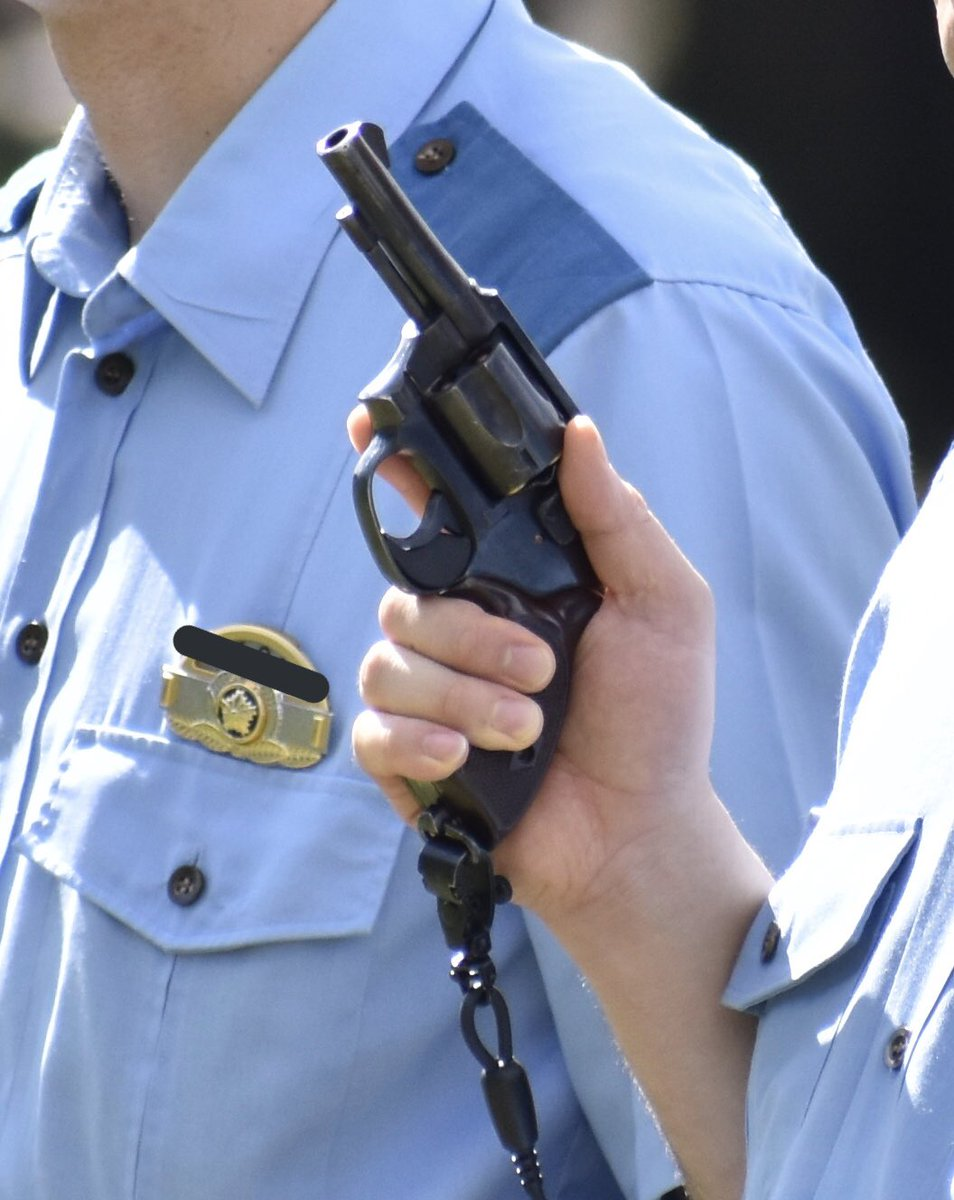
- M60 revolver being used by Nara Prefecture police
- Type: Revolver
- Place of origin: Japan

Service history
- In service: 1960–present

Production history
- Designer: Shin-Chuō Industries
- Manufacturer: Shin-Chuō Industries (later merged with Minebea)
- Produced: 1960–1999
- Variants: See Variants

Specifications
- Mass: 685 g 850 g (Sakura)
- Length: 198 mm 300 mm (Sakura)
- Barrel length: 51 mm 77 mm 153 mm (Sakura)
- Cartridge: .38 Special (9.1×29mmR)
- Caliber: .38 (9mm)
- Action: Double-action/single-action
- Effective firing range: 50 m
- Feed system: 5-Round swing out cylinder
- Sights: Fixed open Patridge; Adjustable rear open Patridge (Sakura)

The New Nambu M60 (ニューナンブM60) is a double-action revolver chambered in .38 Special based upon Smith & Wesson-style designs.

== History ==
In the pre-war era, most Japanese law enforcement officials had only a sabre. During the Occupation, the Supreme Commander for the Allied Powers suggested that they be equipped with firearms. Because of the insufficient stocks of the domestic handguns, Japanese police started to receive service firearms leased from the Allies from 1949, and by 1951, all officers were issued handguns.

At the beginning, types of sidearm varied, but M1911 pistols and M1917 revolvers, Smith & Wesson Military & Police and Colt Official Police were used as the main sidearm. The .38 caliber revolvers were well-received, but .45 caliber handguns were too large to carry for somewhat smaller officers, especially women. M1917 revolvers were beginning to be seen as obsolete and deteriorated significantly, so malfunctions or reduced accuracy had been a problem. As a response to these issues, the National Rural Police Headquarters (one of the predecessors of the National Police Agency) and some Municipal Police Departments (predecessors of Prefectural Police Departments) started to import small .38 Special caliber revolvers, such as Smith & Wesson Chiefs Special and Colt Detective Special. But there were many handguns to be replaced, and with the policy of protecting industrial growth, the Ministry of International Trade and Industry (MITI) had been oriented to domestic production of service firearms.

In 1957, the development was started by Shin-Chuō Industries under the leadership of the MITI to promote domestic firearms production. The development of three handguns had been promoted at the same time in parallel: .32 ACP caliber semi-automatic pistols, 9×19mm Parabellum caliber semi-automatic pistols, and .38 Special caliber revolvers. It was designed and produced by Shin-Chuō Industries, later merged with Minebea. "New Nambu" was named after Kijirō Nambu, a notable firearm designer and the founder of Shin-Chuō Industries. Semi-automatic pistols were completed as New Nambu M57, but both of them did not enter into mass production. On the other hand, the revolver, completed as New Nambu M60, was satisfactory for the National Police Agency, and mass production was started in 1960.

Approximately 133,400 M60 revolvers have been produced since 1961 until the production’s end in 1999. Deployment of small semi-automatic pistols was considered afterward, but this plan was abandoned after small numbers of SIG Sauer P230 were deployed. Imports from the United States resumed. The Smith & Wesson Model 37 and a variant of Model 360 revolvers (SAKURA M360J) have been purchased for uniformed officers.

== Design ==
The basic design of the M60 was based on those of the "J-Frame" and "K-Frame" revolvers of Smith & Wesson company. The revolver has a five-round cylinder, but does not fit a "J-Frame" speedloader because the actual cylinder is slightly larger. The weapon's barrel has 5 grooves, with a right hand twist and 1 turn in 15 inches. Barrel lengths vary from 2 to 3 inches.

The trigger mechanism is double-action/single-action. The Minebea M60's accuracy is excellent in single-action shooting, capable of groupings of 50-millimetre (2.0 in) at 25 metres (27 yd).

== Variants ==
The M60 was manufactured with either two or three inch barrels as described above.

=== New Nambu M60 Sakura ===
Sport-use intended variant equipped with weighted longer barrel, adjustable rear sight, and adjustable competition grip.

The M60 Sakura never went past its prototype phase. Only three models were exported for Europe.

== Adoption ==
The M60 is one of the standard firearms carried by Japanese law enforcement alongside the SIG Sauer P230, Smith & Wesson Model 37 and Smith & Wesson M360J Sakura.

== Bibliography ==
=== Articles ===
- Matsuo, Satoshi (September 2015). "New Nambu M60". Gun Professionals. Hobby Japan: 80–85.
- Ogawa, Kazuhisa [in Japanese] (September 2015). 犬に13発も発砲した警官ではテロなど防げない…軍事アナリストが警告 [Military analyst's warning about firearms of police officers]. Doubt the NEWS!. Strategic Research Institute of International Change.
- Otsuka, Masatsugu (2009). 日本警察の拳銃 [Guns of the Japanese police]. Strike and Tactical Magazine (in Japanese). 6 (1). KAMADO: 50–57.
- Toda, Ippō (February 2019). 拳銃を狙い続発する交番襲撃、大惨事を防ぐ対策は進んでいるのか [More police station raids to grab guns: are measures being taken to prevent catastrophe?]. ASCII.jp. ASCII Corporation. Archived from the original on 2019-02-02.

=== Books ===
- Takemae, Eiji [in Japanese] (2000). History of the non-military activities of the Occupation of Japan, 1945-1951 (15) (in Japanese). Nihon Tosho Center. ISBN 978-4820565376.
- Hogg, Ian (1989). Jane's Infantry Weapons 1989-90 (15th ed.). Jane's Information Group. ISBN 0-7106-0889-6.
- Jones, Richard (2007). Jane's Infantry Weapons 2007-2008. Jane's Information Group. ISBN 978-0-7106-2801-5.
- Walter, John (2023). Nambu Pistols:Japanese military handguns 1900–45. New York, NY: Osprey Publishing. ISBN 9781472855428.
