= Ministry of Agriculture, Forestry and Fisheries (Japan) =

Government ministry of Japan

- 農林水産省; Nōrin-suisan-shō

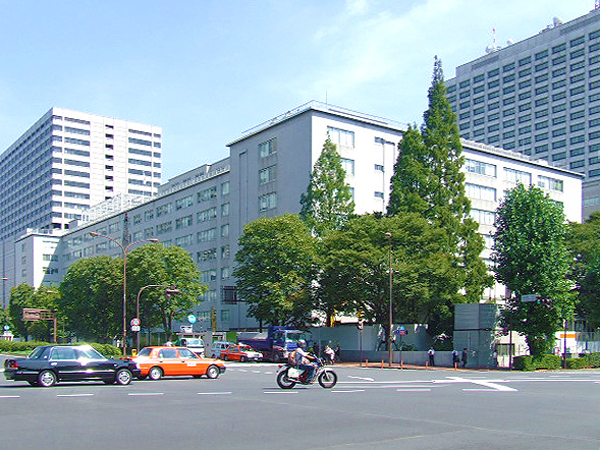
- MAFF building

Agency overview
- Preceding agencies: Ministry of Agriculture and Commerce (1881–1925, 1943–1945); Ministry of Agriculture and Forestry (1925–1943, 1945–1978)
- Jurisdiction: Government of Japan
- Headquarters: 1-2-1 Kasumigaseki, Chiyoda-ku, Tokyo 100-8950 Japan; 35.674°N 139.752°E
- Employees: 18,744
- Ministers responsible: Arata Takebe, Minister; Yukinori Nemoto, State Minister; Yūhei Yamashita, State Minister
- Child agencies: Forestry Agency; Fisheries Agency
- Website: maff.go.jp/e

The Ministry of Agriculture, Forestry and Fisheries (農林水産省, Nōrin-suisan-shō; MAFF) is a cabinet level ministry in the government of Japan responsible for oversight of the agriculture, forestry and fishing industries. Its acronym is MAFF. The current Minister of Agriculture, Forestry and Fisheries is Norikazu Suzuki.

== History ==
The Constitution of the Empire of Japan provided for the creation of a Ministry of Agriculture and Commerce (農商務省, Nōshōmu-shō), which was established in 1881, with Tani Tateki as its first minister. As an additional note, the Ministry of Agriculture and Commerce was a division that served as the Ministry of Agriculture, Forestry and Fisheries and the Ministry of Economy, Trade and Industry.

In 1925, the commerce functions were separated out into a separate Ministry of Commerce and Industry (商工省, Shōkō-shō), and the ministry was renamed the Ministry of Agriculture and Forestry (農林省, Nōrin-shō). The ministry was also given responsibility for oversight of the Factory Act of 1903, which provided regulations for work hours and worker safety in both industrial and agricultural industries.

From 1943 to 1945, when most of the Ministry of Commerce and Industry was merged into the Ministry of Munitions (軍需省, Gunjushō) due to the mobilisation of industry for the war effort in World War II, parts of that ministry reverted to the Ministry of Agriculture and Forestry, which was again briefly named Ministry of Agriculture and Commerce (農商省, Nōshō-shō).

In 1978, the name of Ministry of Agriculture and Forestry was expanded to the Ministry of Agriculture, Forestry and Fisheries to better reflect the ministry's role in guaranteeing the Japanese public a safe food supply, and to protect producers and workers in the food production industries.

== Organization ==
=== Internal bureaus ===
- Minister's Secretariat (大臣官房)
- Food Safety and Consumer Affairs Bureau (消費・安全局)
- Export and International Affairs Bureau (輸出・国際局)
- Crop Production Bureau (農産局)
- Livestock Industry Bureau (畜産局)
- Management Improvement Bureau (経営局)
- Rural Development Bureau (農村振興局)

=== Affiliated agencies ===
- Forestry Agency (林野庁)
- Fisheries Agency (水産庁)

== List of ministers ==
The following list below is a list of notable ministers appointed since 1976.

#	Agency Minister	Debut month	Retire month	Prime Minister
-	Zenkō Suzuki	December 1976	November 1977	Takeo Fukuda
1	Ichiro Nakagawa	November 1977	December 1978	Takeo Fukuda
2	Michio Watanabe	December 1978	November 1979	Masayoshi Ōhira
3	Kabun Mutō	November 1979	July 1980	Masayoshi Ōhira
5	Kichirō Tazawa	November 1981	November 1982	Zenkō Suzuki
9	Tsutomu Hata	December 1985	July 1986	Yasuhiro Nakasone
12	Tsutomu Hata	December 1988	June 1989	Noboru Takeshita
14	Michihiko Kano	August 1989	February 1990	Toshiki Kaifu
17	Masami Tanabu	November 1991	August 1993	Kiichi Miyazawa
22	Hosei Norota	August 1995	January 1996	Tomiichi Murayama
27	Shōichi Nakagawa	August 1998	October 1999	Keizō Obuchi
32	Tsutomu Takebe	April 2001	September 2002	Junichiro Koizumi
33	Tadamori Ōshima	October 2002	March 2003	Junichiro Koizumi
35	Yoshiyuki Kamei	April 2003	September 2004	Junichiro Koizumi
41	Toshikatsu Matsuoka	September 2006	May 2007	Shinzō Abe
45	Masatoshi Wakabayashi	September 2007	July 2008	Yasuo Fukuda
47	Shigeru Ishiba	September 2008	September 2009	Tarō Asō
53	Yoshimasa Hayashi	December 2012	September 2014	Shinzō Abe
57	Hiroshi Moriyama	October 2015	July 2016	Shinzō Abe
61	Takamori Yoshikawa	October 2018	September 2019	Shinzō Abe
63	Taku Etō	September 2019	September 2020	Shinzō Abe
64	Kōtarō Nogami	September 2020	October 2021	Yoshihide Suga
65	Genjirō Kaneko	October 2021	August 2022	Fumio Kishida
67	Tetsuro Nomura	August 2022	September 2023	Fumio Kishida
68	Ichiro Miyashita	September 2023	December 2023	Fumio Kishida
69	Tetsushi Sakamoto	December 2023	October 2024	Fumio Kishida
70	Yasuhiro Ozato	October 2024	November 2024	Shigeru Ishiba
71	Taku Etō	November 2024	May 2025	Shigeru Ishiba
72	Shinjirō Koizumi	May 2025	October 2025	Shigeru Ishiba
73	Norikazu Suzuki	October 2025		Sanae Takaichi

== Functional activities ==
The primary function of the ministry is to set quality standards for food products, supervise commodity markets and food sales, and to undertake land reclamation and land improvement projects.

== See also ==
- Agriculture, forestry, and fishing in Japan
- Agricultural Protectionism in Japan
- Japan Agricultural Cooperatives
- Office of Korea Rural Development
- Korea Forest Service
- Shokuiku
- Japan Racing Association
